= 1870 Manchester City Council election =

Local election in Manchester

- 1 November 1869

16 of 64 seats to Manchester City Council 33 seats needed for a majority

Elections to Manchester City Council were held on Tuesday, 1 November 1870. One third of the councillors seats were up for election, with each successful candidate to serve a three-year term of office.

== Ward results ==
=== All Saints' ===
All Saints'
Party	Candidate	Votes	%	±%
Liberal	William Batty*	917	53.2	N/A
Conservative	W. S. Hodgson	806	46.8	−27.8
Majority		111	6.4	
Turnout		1,723		
Liberal hold		Swing		

=== Ardwick ===
Ardwick
Party	Candidate	Votes	%	±%
Liberal	John Vickers	1,841	51.7	N/A
Conservative	James Hardon*	1,717	48.3	−9.6
Majority		124	3.4	
Turnout		3,558		
Liberal gain from Conservative		Swing		

=== Cheetham ===
Cheetham
Party	Candidate	Votes	%	±%
Conservative	James Croston	1,040	51.1	+10.8
Liberal	James Howe	994	48.9	−10.8
Majority		46	2.2	
Turnout		2,034		
Conservative gain from		Swing		

=== Collegiate Church ===
Collegiate Church
Party	Candidate	Votes	%	±%
Liberal	Thomas Worthington*	743	51.0	−1.9
Conservative	Timothy Boddington	713	49.0	+1.9
Majority		30	2.0	−3.8
Turnout		1,456		
Liberal hold		Swing		

=== Exchange ===
Exchange
Party	Candidate	Votes	%	±%
Liberal	Thomas Warburton*	385	58.7	N/A
Conservative	James Sawley Brown	271	41.3	N/A
Majority		114	17.4	N/A
Turnout		656		
Liberal hold		Swing		

=== Medlock Street ===
Medlock Street
Party	Candidate	Votes	%	±%
Liberal	John Marshall	1,758	62.1	+18.2
Liberal	T. B. Waters	1,073	37.9	−6.0
Majority		685	24.2	
Turnout		2,831		
Liberal gain from Liberal		Swing		

=== New Cross ===
New Cross
Party	Candidate	Votes	%	±%
Liberal	Charles Stewart	uncontested		
Conservative	Adam Woodward*	uncontested		
Liberal hold		Swing		
Conservative hold		Swing		

=== Oxford ===
Oxford
Party	Candidate	Votes	%	±%
Conservative	Laurence Rostron	567	61.0	N/A
Liberal	Charles Thompson*	362	39.0	−22.0
Majority		205	22.0	
Turnout		929		
Conservative gain from Liberal		Swing		

=== St. Ann's ===
St. Ann's
Party	Candidate	Votes	%	±%
Liberal	Thomas Baker*	uncontested		
Liberal hold		Swing		

=== St. Clement's ===
St. Clement's
Party	Candidate	Votes	%	±%
Conservative	J. W. Whitaker*	1,185	52.5	−12.4
Liberal	Thomas A. Bazley	1,071	47.5	+12.4
Majority		114	5.0	−24.8
Turnout		2,256		
Conservative hold		Swing		

=== St. George's ===
St. George's
Party	Candidate	Votes	%	±%
Liberal	Thomas Schofield*	uncontested		
Liberal hold		Swing		

=== St. James' ===
St. James'
Party	Candidate	Votes	%	±%
Conservative	John Waterhouse*	uncontested		
Conservative hold		Swing		

=== St. John's ===
St. John's
Party	Candidate	Votes	%	±%
Liberal	Jonathan Robert Hampson*	784	53.5	N/A
Conservative	William Griffin	682	46.5	N/A
Majority		102	7.0	N/A
Turnout		1,466		
Liberal hold		Swing		

=== St. Luke's ===
St. Luke's
Party	Candidate	Votes	%	±%
Liberal	John Duncan	uncontested		
Liberal gain from Conservative		Swing		

=== St. Michael's ===
St. Michael's
Party	Candidate	Votes	%	±%
Liberal	William Brown	2,921	50.4	+1.5
Conservative	William Touchstone	2,009	34.7	−16.4
Conservative	Godfrey Noble	865	14.9	−36.2
Majority		912	15.7	
Turnout		5,795		
Liberal gain from Conservative		Swing		
