= 1889 Manchester City Council election =

Local election in Manchester

- 1 November 1889

19 of 76 seats to Manchester City Council 39 seats needed for a majority
	First party	Second party	Third party
Party	Conservative	Liberal	Liberal Unionist
Last election	10 seats, 62.7%	4 seats, 31.5%	5 seats, 0.0%
Seats before	36	30	10
Seats won	9	9	1
Seats after	36	30	10
Seat change	Steady	Steady	Steady
Popular vote	16,170	15,780	0
Percentage	48.6%	47.4%	0.0%
Swing	▼14.1%	▲15.9%	Steady
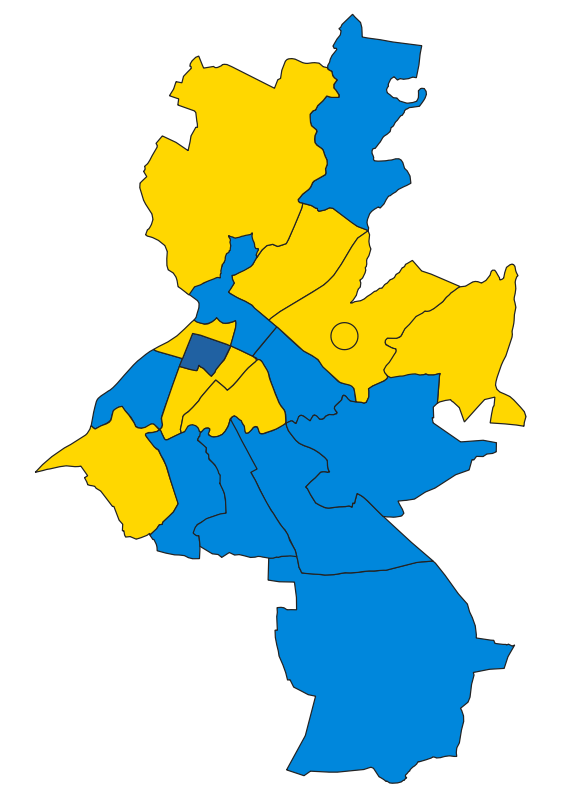
- Map of results of 1889 election
Leader of the Council before election
No overall control
Leader of the Council after election
No overall control

Elections to Manchester City Council were held on Friday, 1 November 1889. One third of the councillors seats were up for election, with each successful candidate to serve a three-year term of office. The council remained under no overall control.

== Election result ==
Party	Votes		Seats			Full Council	
Conservative Party	16,170 (48.6%)	▼14.1	9 (47.4%)	9 / 19	Steady	36 (47.4%)	36 / 76
Liberal Party	15,780 (47.4%)	▲15.9	9 (47.4%)	9 / 19	Steady	30 (39.5%)	30 / 76
Liberal Unionist	0 (0.0%)	Steady	1 (5.3%)	1 / 19	Steady	10 (13.2%)	10 / 76
Independent	1,350 (4.1%)	Steady	0 (0.0%)	0 / 19	Steady	0 (0.0%)	0 / 76

=== Full council ===
↓
30	10	36

=== Aldermen ===
↓
8	4	7

=== Councillors ===
↓
22	6	29

== Ward results ==
=== All Saints' ===
All Saints'
Party	Candidate	Votes	%	±%
Conservative	S. Ashcroft*	1,424	59.2	N/A
Liberal	W. B. Pritchard	982	40.8	N/A
Majority		442	18.4	N/A
Turnout		2,406		
Conservative hold		Swing		

=== Ardwick ===
Ardwick
Party	Candidate	Votes	%	±%
Conservative	S. Chesters Thompson*	2,596	68.6	N/A
Liberal	J. H. Whitehouse	1,187	31.4	N/A
Majority		1,409	37.2	N/A
Turnout		3,783		
Conservative hold		Swing		

=== Bradford ===
Bradford
Party	Candidate	Votes	%	±%
Liberal	J. Hutt*	uncontested		
Liberal hold		Swing		

=== Cheetham ===
Cheetham
Party	Candidate	Votes	%	±%
Liberal	J. Rushworth*	uncontested		
Liberal hold		Swing		

=== Collegiate Church ===
Collegiate Church
Party	Candidate	Votes	%	±%
Conservative	J. Bradshaw	834	57.4	N/A
Liberal	E. Barton	619	42.6	N/A
Majority		215	14.8	N/A
Turnout		1,453		
Conservative gain from Liberal		Swing		

=== Exchange ===
Exchange
Party	Candidate	Votes	%	±%
Liberal	J. Milling*	uncontested		
Liberal hold		Swing		

=== Harpurhey ===
Harpurhey
Party	Candidate	Votes	%	±%
Conservative	J. Richards*	2,104	62.0	N/A
Liberal	T. W. Foxcroft	1,288	38.0	N/A
Majority		816	24.0	N/A
Turnout		3,392		
Conservative hold		Swing		

=== Medlock Street ===
Medlock Street
Party	Candidate	Votes	%	±%
Conservative	H. H. Mainwaring*	1,949	55.3	N/A
Liberal	T. Swindells	1,577	44.7	N/A
Majority		372	10.6	N/A
Turnout		3,526		
Conservative hold		Swing		

=== New Cross ===
New Cross
Party	Candidate	Votes	%	±%
Liberal	R. Lloyd*	2,453	53.5	N/A
Liberal	W. Birkbeck*	2,443	53.3	N/A
Conservative	J. Burgess	2,210	48.2	N/A
Conservative	J. Taylor	2,075	45.2	N/A
Majority		223	4.8	N/A
Turnout		4,586		
Liberal hold		Swing		
Liberal hold		Swing		

=== Oxford ===
Oxford
Party	Candidate	Votes	%	±%
Liberal	B. T. Leech*	uncontested		
Liberal hold		Swing		

=== Rusholme ===
Rusholme
Party	Candidate	Votes	%	±%
Conservative	S. Royle*	999	51.5	N/A
Liberal	W. Johnson	942	48.5	N/A
Majority		57	3.0	N/A
Turnout		1,941		
Conservative hold		Swing		

=== St. Ann's ===
St. Ann's
Party	Candidate	Votes	%	±%
Liberal Unionist	J. D. Milne*	uncontested		
Liberal Unionist hold		Swing		

=== St. Clement's ===
St. Clement's
Party	Candidate	Votes	%	±%
Conservative	N. C. Schou*	800	55.1	−2.3
Liberal	J. Brierley	652	44.9	+2.3
Majority		148	10.2	−4.6
Turnout		1,452		
Conservative hold		Swing		

=== St. George's ===
St. George's
Party	Candidate	Votes	%	±%
Liberal	J. Tatton	1,987	59.5	N/A
Independent	A. Alsop	1,350	40.5	N/A
Majority		637	19.0	N/A
Turnout		3,337		
Liberal hold		Swing		

=== St. James' ===
St. James'
Party	Candidate	Votes	%	±%
Liberal	A. E. Lloyd*	uncontested		
Liberal hold		Swing		

=== St. John's ===
St. John's
Party	Candidate	Votes	%	±%
Conservative	W. Robinson*	uncontested		
Conservative hold		Swing		

=== St. Luke's ===
St. Luke's
Party	Candidate	Votes	%	±%
Conservative	A. Marshall*	uncontested		
Conservative hold		Swing		

=== St. Michael's ===
St. Michael's
Party	Candidate	Votes	%	±%
Liberal	D. McCabe	1,650	58.3	N/A
Conservative	J. Lee	1,179	41.7	N/A
Majority		471	16.6	N/A
Turnout		2,829		
Liberal hold		Swing		

== Aldermanic elections ==
=== Aldermanic election, 9 November 1889 ===
At the meeting of the council on 9 November 1889, the terms of office of ten aldermen expired.

The following ten were elected as aldermen by the council on 9 November 1889 for a term of six years.

Party	Alderman	Ward	Term expires
Liberal	Abel Heywood*	Collegiate Church	1895
Liberal Unionist	John Hopkinson*	All Saints'	1895
Liberal Unionist	John King*	Oxford	1895
Conservative	Joseph Lamb*	New Cross	1895
Liberal Unionist	John Mark*	St. Ann's	1895
Conservative	Richard Lovatt Reade*	Rusholme	1895
Conservative	William Robinson	Unassigned	1895
Conservative	Hugo Shaw*	Bradford	1895
Liberal	Joseph Thompson*	Ardwick	1895
Conservative	William Tessimond Windsor*	St. James'	1895

=== Aldermanic election, 4 June 1890 ===
Caused by the resignation on 7 May 1890 of Alderman William Batty (Liberal, elected as an alderman by the council on 6 February 1884).

In his place, Councillor John Milling (Liberal, Exchange, elected 5 April 1879) was elected as an alderman by the council on 4 June 1890.

Party	Alderman	Ward	Term expires
Liberal	John Milling		1892

== By-elections between 1889 and 1890 ==
=== St. Ann's, 4 November 1889 ===
Caused by the election as an alderman of Councillor John Mark (Liberal Unionist, St. Ann's, elected 14 August 1877) on 30 October 1889 following the death on 19 October 1889 of Alderman John Marsland Bennett (Conservative, elected as an alderman by the council on 9 November 1859).

St. Ann's
Party	Candidate	Votes	%	±%
Conservative	W. H. Vaudrey	uncontested		
Conservative hold		Swing		

=== Oxford, 18 November 1889 ===
Caused by the resignation of Councillor Benjamin Gibbons (Conservative, Oxford, elected 24 March 1885) on 9 November 1889.

Oxford
Party	Candidate	Votes	%	±%
Conservative	H. Simpson	uncontested		
Conservative hold		Swing		

=== St. John's, 25 November 1889 ===
Caused by the election as an alderman of Councillor William Robinson (Conservative, St. John's, elected 1 November 1877) on 9 November 1889 following the defeat on 9 November 1889 of Alderman William Brown (Liberal, elected as an alderman by the council on 9 November 1885).

St. John's
Party	Candidate	Votes	%	±%
Liberal	F. Smallman	500	51.8	N/A
Conservative	J. Woodhouse	466	48.2	N/A
Majority		34	3.6	N/A
Turnout		2,602		
Liberal gain from Conservative		Swing		

=== Exchange, 9 June 1890 ===
Caused by the election as an alderman of Councillor John Milling (Liberal, Exchange, elected 5 April 1879) on 4 June 1890 following the resignation on 7 May 1890 of Alderman William Batty (Liberal, elected as an alderman by the council on 6 February 1884).

Exchange
Party	Candidate	Votes	%	±%
Liberal	J. G. Batty	uncontested		
Liberal hold		Swing		
