= 1882 Manchester City Council election =

Local election in Manchester

- 1 November 1882

16 of 64 seats to Manchester City Council 33 seats needed for a majority
	First party	Second party
Party	Liberal	Conservative
Last election	8 seats, 43.5%	8 seats, 52.2%
Seats before	40	24
Seats won	12	4
Seats after	40	24
Seat change	Steady	Steady
Popular vote	2,061	3,145
Percentage	39.6%	60.4%
Swing	▼3.9%	▲8.2%
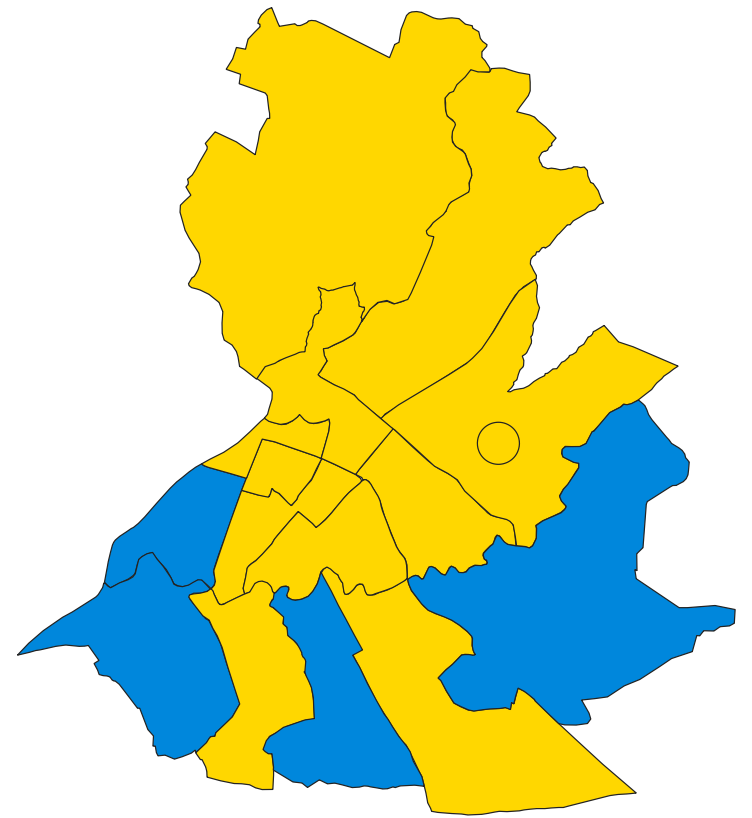
- Map of results of 1882 election
Leader of the Council before election
Liberal
Leader of the Council after election
Liberal

Elections to Manchester City Council took place on Wednesday, 1 November 1882. One third of the councillors seats were up for election, with each successful candidate to serve a three-year term of office. The Liberal Party retained overall control of the council.

== Election result ==
Party	Votes		Seats			Full Council	
Liberal Party	2,061 (39.6%)	▼3.9	12 (75.0%)	12 / 16	Steady	40 (62.5%)	40 / 64
Conservative Party	3,145 (60.4%)	▲8.2	4 (25.0%)	4 / 16	Steady	24 (37.5%)	24 / 64

=== Full council ===
↓
40	24

=== Aldermen ===
↓
12	4

=== Councillors ===
↓
28	20

== Ward results ==
=== All Saints' ===
All Saints'
Party	Candidate	Votes	%	±%
Conservative	J. Roberts	994	54.1	−4.8
Liberal	J. H. Ryder*	842	45.9	N/A
Majority		152	8.2	−9.6
Turnout		1,836		
Conservative gain from Liberal		Swing		

=== Ardwick ===
Ardwick
Party	Candidate	Votes	%	±%
Conservative	J. Hinchliffe*	uncontested		
Conservative hold		Swing		

=== Cheetham ===
Cheetham
Party	Candidate	Votes	%	±%
Liberal	W. Holt	1,219	50.1	N/A
Conservative	J. Croston*	1,214	49.9	N/A
Majority		5	0.2	N/A
Turnout		2,433		
Liberal gain from Conservative		Swing		

=== Collegiate Church ===
Collegiate Church
Party	Candidate	Votes	%	±%
Liberal	T. S. Muirhead*	uncontested		
Liberal hold		Swing		

=== Exchange ===
Exchange
Party	Candidate	Votes	%	±%
Liberal	W. Batty*	uncontested		
Liberal hold		Swing		

=== Medlock Street ===
Medlock Street
Party	Candidate	Votes	%	±%
Liberal	A. Evans*	uncontested		
Liberal hold		Swing		

=== New Cross ===
New Cross
Party	Candidate	Votes	%	±%
Liberal	T. Bright*	uncontested		
Liberal	C. Stewart*	uncontested		
Liberal hold		Swing		
Liberal hold		Swing		

=== Oxford ===
Oxford
Party	Candidate	Votes	%	±%
Liberal	G. Clay	uncontested		
Liberal hold		Swing		

=== St. Ann's ===
St. Ann's
Party	Candidate	Votes	%	±%
Liberal	J. Mark*	uncontested		
Liberal hold		Swing		

=== St. Clement's ===
St. Clement's
Party	Candidate	Votes	%	±%
Liberal	T. A. Bazley*	uncontested		
Liberal hold		Swing		

=== St. George's ===
St. George's
Party	Candidate	Votes	%	±%
Conservative	R. Lovatt Reade*	uncontested		
Conservative hold		Swing		

=== St. James' ===
St. James'
Party	Candidate	Votes	%	±%
Liberal	P. Goldschmidt*	uncontested		
Liberal hold		Swing		

=== St. John's ===
St. John's
Party	Candidate	Votes	%	±%
Conservative	G. Kenworthy	522	55.7	N/A
Conservative	J. Smith*	415	44.3	N/A
Majority		107	11.4	N/A
Turnout		937		
Conservative gain from Conservative		Swing		

=== St. Luke's ===
St. Luke's
Party	Candidate	Votes	%	±%
Liberal	J. Hoy	uncontested		
Liberal hold		Swing		

=== St. Michael's ===
St. Michael's
Party	Candidate	Votes	%	±%
Liberal	W. Brown*	uncontested		
Liberal hold		Swing		
