= 1876 Manchester City Council election =

Local election in Manchester

- 1 November 1876

16 of 64 seats to Manchester City Council 33 seats needed for a majority
	First party	Second party
Party	Liberal	Conservative
Last election	12 seats, 50.8%	4 seats, 49.2%
Seats before	42	22
Seats won	13	3
Seats after	43	21
Seat change	▲1	▼1
Popular vote	15,894	14,776
Percentage	51.8%	48.2%
Swing	▲1.0%	▼1.0%
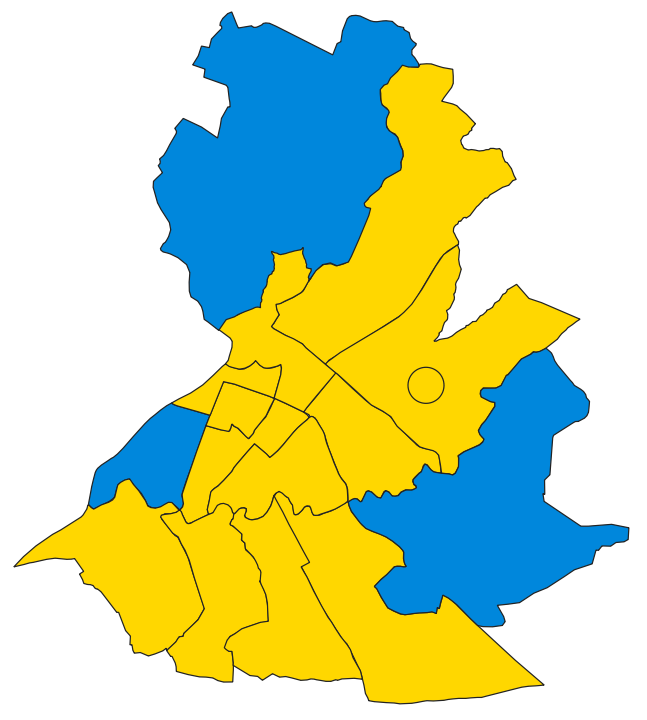
- Map of results of 1876 election
Leader of the Council before election
Liberal
Leader of the Council after election
Liberal

Elections to Manchester City Council took place on Wednesday, 1 November 1876. One third of the councillors seats were up for election, with each successful candidate to serve a three-year term of office. The Liberal Party retained overall control of the council.

== Election result ==
Party	Votes		Seats			Full Council	
Liberal Party	15,894 (51.8%)	▲1.0	13 (81.3%)	13 / 16	▲1	43 (67.2%)	44 / 64
Conservative Party	14,776 (48.2%)	▼1.0	3 (18.7%)	3 / 16	▼1	21 (32.8%)	21 / 64

=== Full council ===
↓
43	21

=== Aldermen ===
↓
11	5

=== Councillors ===
↓
32	16

== Ward results ==
=== All Saints' ===
All Saints'
Party	Candidate	Votes	%	±%
Liberal	C. Walker*	1,021	54.0	+1.4
Conservative	W. T. Windsor	869	46.0	−1.4
Majority		152	8.0	+2.8
Turnout		1,890		
Liberal hold		Swing		

=== Ardwick ===
Ardwick
Party	Candidate	Votes	%	±%
Conservative	R. K. Payne*	uncontested		
Conservative hold		Swing		

=== Cheetham ===
Cheetham
Party	Candidate	Votes	%	±%
Conservative	J. Croston*	uncontested		
Conservative hold		Swing		

=== Collegiate Church ===
Collegiate Church
Party	Candidate	Votes	%	±%
Liberal	T. S. Muirhead	uncontested		
Liberal hold		Swing		

=== Exchange ===
Exchange
Party	Candidate	Votes	%	±%
Liberal	W. Batty*	513	55.6	+4.4
Conservative	E. H. Downs	410	44.4	−4.4
Majority		103	11.2	+8.8
Turnout		923		
Liberal hold		Swing		

=== Medlock Street ===
Medlock Street
Party	Candidate	Votes	%	±%
Liberal	A. Evans*	1,677	58.4	+3.2
Conservative	G. Anderton	1,195	41.6	−3.2
Majority		482	16.8	+6.4
Turnout		2,872		
Liberal hold		Swing		

=== New Cross ===
New Cross
Party	Candidate	Votes	%	±%
Liberal	C. Stewart*	2,913	50.9	−1.2
Liberal	T. Bright*	2,895	50.6	−1.5
Conservative	T. Greenwood	2,643	46.2	−2.7
Conservative	W. G. Bennett	2,564	44.8	−3.9
Majority		252	4.4	+3.0
Turnout		5,719		
Liberal hold		Swing		
Liberal hold		Swing		

=== Oxford ===
Oxford
Party	Candidate	Votes	%	±%
Liberal	M. Hilton	465	52.2	N/A
Conservative	R. T. Walker	425	47.8	N/A
Majority		40	4.4	N/A
Turnout		890		
Liberal gain from Conservative		Swing		

=== St. Ann's ===
St. Ann's
Party	Candidate	Votes	%	±%
Liberal	J. Fox Turner*	uncontested		
Liberal hold		Swing		

=== St. Clement's ===
St. Clement's
Party	Candidate	Votes	%	±%
Liberal	T. A. Bazley*	uncontested		
Liberal hold		Swing		

=== St. George's ===
St. George's
Party	Candidate	Votes	%	±%
Liberal	R. B. Goldsworthy*	1,534	50.1	N/A
Conservative	R. Lovatt Reade	1,532	49.9	N/A
Majority		2	0.2	N/A
Turnout		3,066		
Liberal hold		Swing		

=== St. James' ===
St. James'
Party	Candidate	Votes	%	±%
Liberal	P. Goldschmidt*	uncontested		
Liberal hold		Swing		

=== St. John's ===
St. John's
Party	Candidate	Votes	%	±%
Conservative	J. Smith*	822	63.9	+3.4
Liberal	W. Crighton	464	36.1	−3.4
Majority		358	27.8	+6.8
Turnout		1,286		
Conservative hold		Swing		

=== St. Luke's ===
St. Luke's
Party	Candidate	Votes	%	±%
Liberal	A. Murray*	1,333	51.1	+8.4
Conservative	W. Carter	1,278	48.9	−8.4
Majority		55	2.2	
Turnout		2,611		
Liberal hold		Swing		

=== St. Michael's ===
St. Michael's
Party	Candidate	Votes	%	±%
Liberal	W. Brown*	3,079	50.3	−1.4
Conservative	J. Richards	3,038	49.7	+1.4
Majority		41	0.6	−2.8
Turnout		6,117		
Liberal hold		Swing		
