= 1886 Manchester City Council election =

Local election in Manchester

- 1 November 1886

19 of 76 seats to Manchester City Council 39 seats needed for a majority
	First party	Second party	Third party
Party	Conservative	Liberal	Liberal Unionist
Last election	12 seats, 50.3%	13 seats, 46.9%	did not contest
Seats before	36	30	10
Seats won	9	9	1
Seats after	34	32	10
Seat change	▼2	▲2	Steady
Popular vote	16,777	15,917	0
Percentage	50.6%	48.0%	0.0%
Swing	▲0.3%	▲1.1%	N/A
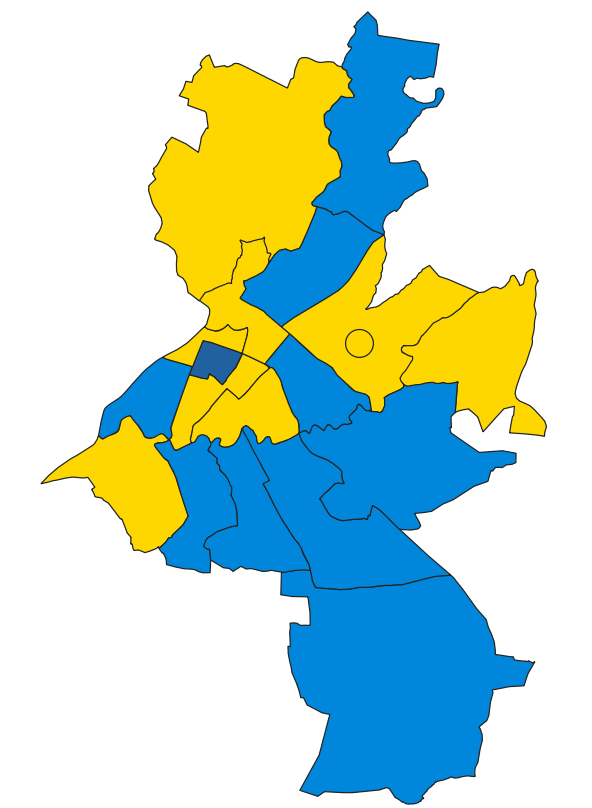
- Map of results of 1886 election
Leader of the Council before election
No overall control
Leader of the Council after election
No overall control

Elections to Manchester City Council were held on Monday, 1 November 1886. One third of the councillors seats were up for election, with each successful candidate to serve a three-year term of office. The council remained under no overall control.

== Election result ==
Party	Votes		Seats			Full Council	
Conservative Party	16,777 (50.6%)	▲0.3	9 (47.4%)	9 / 19	▼2	34 (44.7%)	34 / 76
Liberal Party	15,917 (48.0%)	▲1.1	9 (47.4%)	9 / 19	▲2	32 (42.1%)	32 / 76
Liberal Unionist	0 (0.0%)	N/A	1 (5.3%)	1 / 19	Steady	10 (13.2%)	10 / 76
Independent	427 (1.3%)	N/A	0 (0.0%)	0 / 19	N/A	0 (0.0%)	0 / 76
Independent Liberal	15 (0.0%)	▼2.9	0 (0.0%)	0 / 19	N/A	0 (0.0%)	0 / 76

=== Full council ===
↓
32	10	34

=== Aldermen ===
↓
9	3	7

=== Councillors ===
↓
23	7	27

== Ward results ==
=== All Saints' ===
All Saints'
Party	Candidate	Votes	%	±%
Conservative	S. Ashcroft*	uncontested		
Conservative hold		Swing		

=== Ardwick ===
Ardwick
Party	Candidate	Votes	%	±%
Conservative	S. Chesters Thompson*	uncontested		
Conservative hold		Swing		

=== Bradford ===
Bradford
Party	Candidate	Votes	%	±%
Liberal	J. Hutt*	1,701	53.3	+2.5
Conservative	J. Hislop	1,488	46.7	−18.7
Majority		213	6.6	+1.8
Turnout		3,189		
Liberal hold		Swing		

=== Cheetham ===
Cheetham
Party	Candidate	Votes	%	±%
Liberal	J. Rushworth*	1,124	56.9	+3.6
Conservative	J. Hislop	852	43.1	−3.6
Majority		272	13.8	+7.2
Turnout		1,976		
Liberal hold		Swing		

=== Collegiate Church ===
Collegiate Church
Party	Candidate	Votes	%	±%
Liberal	C. Payne	648	52.9	N/A
Conservative	C. Griffin*	576	47.1	N/A
Majority		72	5.8	N/A
Turnout		1,224		
Liberal gain from Conservative		Swing		

=== Exchange ===
Exchange
Party	Candidate	Votes	%	±%
Liberal	J. Milling*	uncontested		
Liberal hold		Swing		

=== Harpurhey ===
Harpurhey
Party	Candidate	Votes	%	±%
Conservative	J. Richards*	2,084	59.7	−1.2
Liberal	J. R. Lancashire	1,409	40.3	−14.7
Majority		675	19.4	+14.8
Turnout		3,493		
Conservative hold		Swing		

=== Medlock Street ===
Medlock Street
Party	Candidate	Votes	%	±%
Conservative	H. H. Mainwaring*	1,782	56.8	N/A
Liberal	S. C. Richardson	1,356	43.2	N/A
Majority		426	13.6	N/A
Turnout		3,138		
Conservative hold		Swing		

=== New Cross ===
New Cross
Party	Candidate	Votes	%	±%
Liberal	R. Lloyd	2,433	51.6	N/A
Liberal	M. Haworth	2,413	51.2	N/A
Conservative	S. Redfern*	2,332	49.4	N/A
Conservative	J. N. Ogden	2,255	47.8	N/A
Majority		81	1.8	N/A
Turnout		4,717		
Liberal gain from Conservative		Swing		
Liberal hold		Swing		

=== Oxford ===
Oxford
Party	Candidate	Votes	%	±%
Liberal	B. T. Leech*	uncontested		
Liberal hold		Swing		

=== Rusholme ===
Rusholme
Party	Candidate	Votes	%	±%
Conservative	S. Royle*	712	62.5	−7.3
Independent	F. Hampson	427	37.5	N/A
Majority		285	25.0	+24.7
Turnout		1,139		
Conservative hold		Swing		

=== St. Ann's ===
St. Ann's
Party	Candidate	Votes	%	±%
Liberal Unionist	J. D. Milne*	uncontested		
Liberal Unionist hold		Swing		

=== St. Clement's ===
St. Clement's
Party	Candidate	Votes	%	±%
Conservative	N. Schou*	876	54.2	+2.2
Liberal	S. Moore	739	45.8	−2.2
Majority		137	8.4	+4.4
Turnout		1,615		
Conservative hold		Swing		

=== St. George's ===
St. George's
Party	Candidate	Votes	%	±%
Liberal	R. B. Goldsworthy*	2,623	53.8	N/A
Conservative	J. Wainwright	2,248	46.2	N/A
Majority		375	7.6	N/A
Turnout		4,871		
Liberal hold		Swing		

=== St. James' ===
St. James'
Party	Candidate	Votes	%	±%
Liberal	A. E. Lloyd*	uncontested		
Liberal hold		Swing		

=== St. John's ===
St. John's
Party	Candidate	Votes	%	±%
Conservative	W. Robinson*	uncontested		
Conservative hold		Swing		

=== St. Luke's ===
St. Luke's
Party	Candidate	Votes	%	±%
Conservative	A. Marshall*	uncontested		
Conservative hold		Swing		

=== St. Michael's ===
St. Michael's
Party	Candidate	Votes	%	±%
Conservative	G. Moulton*	1,572	51.4	+4.6
Liberal	J. Ashworth	1,471	48.1	−5.1
Independent Liberal	W. Brown	15	0.5	N/A
Majority		101	3.3	
Turnout		3,058		
Conservative hold		Swing		

== Aldermanic elections ==
=== Aldermanic election, 9 November 1886 ===
At the meeting of the council on 9 November 1886, the terms of office of nine aldermen expired.

The following nine were elected as aldermen by the council on 9 November 1886 for a term of six years.

Party	Alderman	Ward	Term expires
Liberal	William Batty*		1892
Conservative	James Craven*		1892
Conservative	Matthew Curtis*		1892
Conservative	William Griffin*	Harpurhey	1892
Liberal	Sir John James Harwood*		1892
Liberal	Henry Patteson*		1892
Liberal	John Foulkes Roberts*		1892
Liberal Unionist	Thomas Schofield*		1892
Liberal	Walton Smith		1892

=== Aldermanic election, 1 December 1886 ===
Caused by the death on 11 November 1886 of Alderman Thomas Rose (Conservative, elected as an alderman by the council on 14 July 1886).

In his place, Councillor George Moulton (Conservative, St. Michael's, elected 2 November 1874) was elected as an alderman by the council on 1 December 1886.

Party	Alderman	Ward	Term expires
Conservative	George Moulton		1889

=== Aldermanic election, 24 June 1887 ===
Caused by the death on 9 June 1887 of the Mayor, Alderman Matthew Curtis (Conservative, elected as an alderman by the council on 5 December 1860).

In his place, Councillor William Livesley (Conservative, St. John's, elected 1 November 1875) was elected as an alderman by the council on 24 June 1887.

Party	Alderman	Ward	Term expires
Conservative	William Livesley		1892

=== Aldermanic election, 7 September 1887 ===
Caused by the death on 22 August 1887 of Alderman James Craven (Conservative, elected as an alderman by the council on 5 May 1886).

In his place, Councillor Edmund Asquith (Liberal, St. Clement's, elected 1 November 1875) was elected as an alderman by the council on 7 September 1887.

Party	Alderman	Ward	Term expires
Liberal	Edmund Asquith		1892

=== Aldermanic election, 7 September 1887 ===
Caused by the death on 7 September 1887 of Alderman Henry Patteson (Liberal, elected as an alderman by the council on 9 November 1868).

In his place, Councillor Alfred Evans (Liberal, Medlock Street, elected 17 June 1876) was elected as an alderman by the council on 5 October 1887.

Party	Alderman	Ward	Term expires
Liberal	Alfred Evans		1892

== By-elections between 1886 and 1887 ==
=== St. Michael's, 17 December 1886 ===
Caused by the election as an alderman of Councillor George Moulton (Conservative, St. Michael's, elected 2 November 1874) on 1 December 1886 following the death on 11 November 1886 of Alderman Thomas Rose (Conservative, elected as an alderman by the council on 14 July 1886).

St. Michael's
Party	Candidate	Votes	%	±%
Liberal	J. Ashworth	1,521	55.8	+7.7
Conservative	S. Redfern	1,193	43.8	−7.6
Liberal	W. F. Meaney	12	0.4	−47.7
Majority		328	12.0	
Turnout		2,726		
Liberal gain from Conservative		Swing		

=== St. John's, 1 July 1887 ===
Caused by the election as an alderman of Councillor William Livesley (Conservative, St. John's, elected 1 November 1875) on 24 June 1887 following the death on 9 June 1887 of the Mayor, Alderman Matthew Curtis (Conservative, elected as an alderman by the council on 5 December 1860).

St. John's
Party	Candidate	Votes	%	±%
Conservative	J. H. Cuff	uncontested		
Conservative hold		Swing		

=== Medlock Street, 18 October 1887 ===
Caused by the election as an alderman of Councillor Alfred Evans (Liberal, Medlock Street, elected 17 June 1876) on 5 October 1887 following the death on 7 September 1887 of Alderman Henry Patteson (Liberal, elected as an alderman by the council on 9 November 1868).

Medlock Street
Party	Candidate	Votes	%	±%
Liberal	W. T. Bax	854	65.2	+22.0
Independent Liberal	J. Jenkins	456	34.8	N/A
Majority		398	30.4	
Turnout		1,310		
Liberal hold		Swing		
