= 1879 Manchester City Council election =

Local election in Manchester

- 1 November 1879

16 of 64 seats to Manchester City Council 33 seats needed for a majority
	First party	Second party
Party	Liberal	Conservative
Last election	10 seats, 50.7%	6 seats, 49.3%
Seats before	42	22
Seats won	12	4
Seats after	42	22
Seat change	Steady	Steady
Popular vote	4,933	4,530
Percentage	52.1%	47.9%
Swing	▲1.4%	▼1.4%
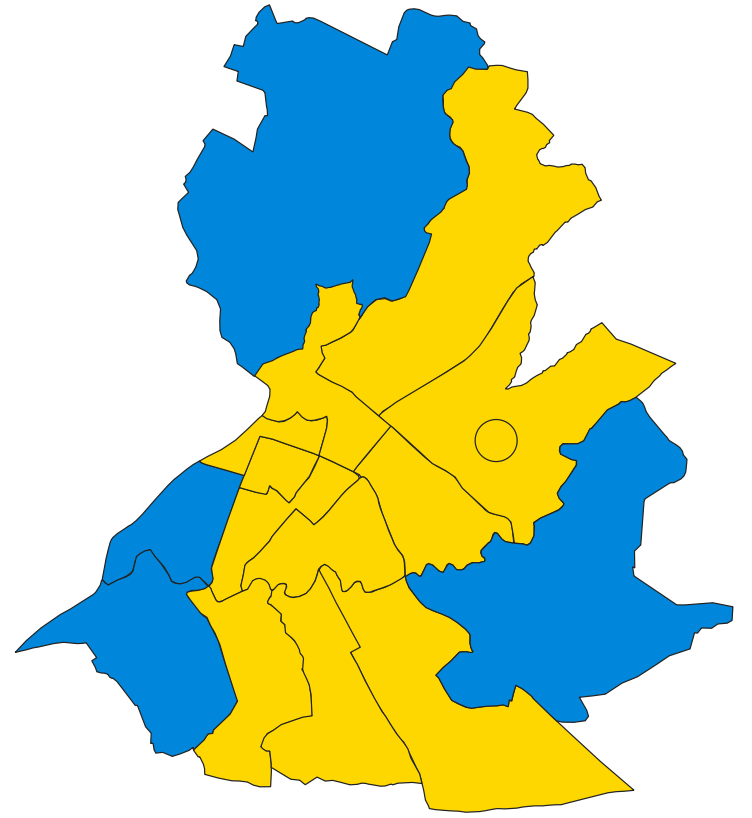
- Map of results of 1879 election
Leader of the Council before election
Liberal
Leader of the Council after election
Liberal

Elections to Manchester City Council took place on Saturday, 1 November 1879. One third of the councillors seats were up for election, with each successful candidate to serve a three-year term of office. The Liberal Party retained overall control of the council.

== Election result ==
Party	Votes		Seats			Full Council	
Liberal Party	4,933 (52.1%)	▲1.4	12 (75.0%)	12 / 16	Steady	42 (65.6%)	42 / 64
Conservative Party	4,530 (47.9%)	▼1.4	4 (25.0%)	4 / 16	Steady	22 (34.4%)	22 / 64

=== Full council ===
↓
42	22

=== Aldermen ===
↓
11	5

=== Councillors ===
↓
31	17

== Ward results ==
=== All Saints' ===
All Saints'
Party	Candidate	Votes	%	±%
Liberal	J. H. Ryder	1,229	54.7	+5.0
Conservative	J. Roberts	1,018	45.3	−5.0
Majority		211	9.4	
Turnout		2,247		
Liberal hold		Swing		

=== Ardwick ===
Ardwick
Party	Candidate	Votes	%	±%
Conservative	J. Hinchliffe	uncontested		
Conservative hold		Swing		

=== Cheetham ===
Cheetham
Party	Candidate	Votes	%	±%
Conservative	J. Croston*	uncontested		
Conservative hold		Swing		

=== Collegiate Church ===
Collegiate Church
Party	Candidate	Votes	%	±%
Liberal	T. S. Muirhead*	uncontested		
Liberal hold		Swing		

=== Exchange ===
Exchange
Party	Candidate	Votes	%	±%
Liberal	W. Batty*	uncontested		
Liberal hold		Swing		

=== Medlock Street ===
Medlock Street
Party	Candidate	Votes	%	±%
Liberal	A. Evans*	uncontested		
Liberal hold		Swing		

=== New Cross ===
New Cross
Party	Candidate	Votes	%	±%
Liberal	T. Bright*	uncontested		
Liberal	C. Stewart*	uncontested		
Liberal hold		Swing		
Liberal hold		Swing		

=== Oxford ===
Oxford
Party	Candidate	Votes	%	±%
Liberal	M. Hilton*	uncontested		
Liberal hold		Swing		

=== St. Ann's ===
St. Ann's
Party	Candidate	Votes	%	±%
Liberal	J. Mark*	uncontested		
Liberal hold		Swing		

=== St. Clement's ===
St. Clement's
Party	Candidate	Votes	%	±%
Liberal	T. A. Bazley*	uncontested		
Liberal hold		Swing		

=== St. George's ===
St. George's
Party	Candidate	Votes	%	±%
Conservative	R. Lovatt Reade*	uncontested		
Conservative hold		Swing		

=== St. James' ===
St. James'
Party	Candidate	Votes	%	±%
Liberal	P. Goldschmidt*	uncontested		
Liberal hold		Swing		

=== St. John's ===
St. John's
Party	Candidate	Votes	%	±%
Conservative	J. Smith*	uncontested		
Conservative hold		Swing		

=== St. Luke's ===
St. Luke's
Party	Candidate	Votes	%	±%
Liberal	A. Murray*	uncontested		
Liberal hold		Swing		

=== St. Michael's ===
St. Michael's
Party	Candidate	Votes	%	±%
Liberal	W. Brown*	3,704	51.3	N/A
Conservative	J. Richards	3,512	48.7	N/A
Majority		192	2.6	N/A
Turnout		7,216		
Liberal hold		Swing		
