= 1873 Manchester City Council election =

Local election in Manchester

- 1 November 1873

16 of 64 seats to Manchester City Council 33 seats needed for a majority
	First party	Second party
Party	Liberal	Conservative
Last election	9 seats, 45.0%	7 seats, 55.0%
Seats before	34	30
Seats won	9	7
Seats after	35	29
Seat change	▲1	▼1
Popular vote	20,023	18,654
Percentage	51.3%	47.8%
Swing	▲6.3%	▼7.2%
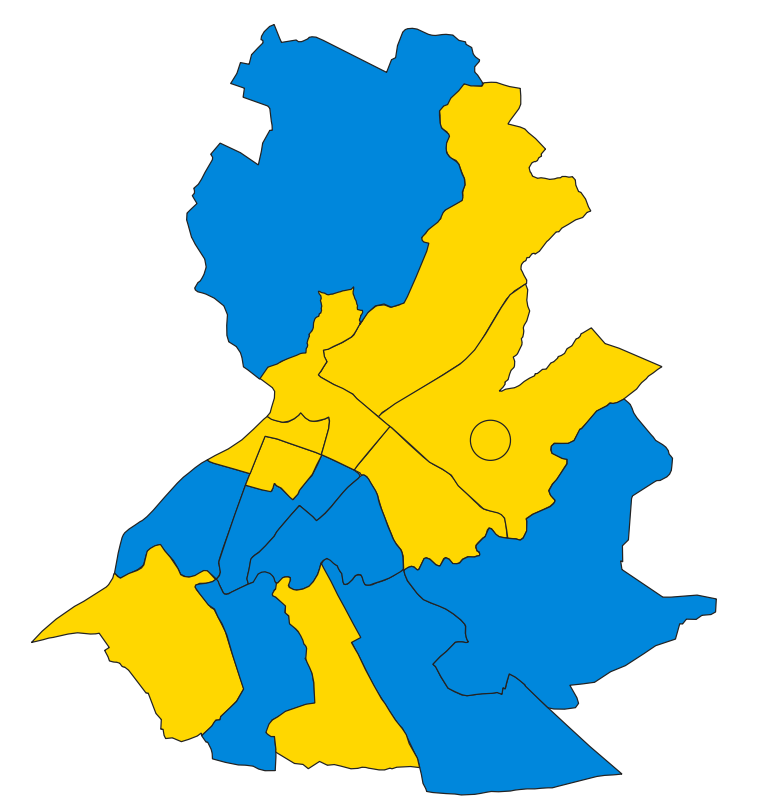
- Map of results of 1873 election
Leader of the Council before election
Liberal
Leader of the Council after election
Liberal

Elections to Manchester City Council were held on Saturday, 1 November 1873. One third of the councillors seats were up for election, with each successful candidate to serve a three-year term of office. The Liberal Party retained overall control of the council.

== Election result ==
Party	Votes		Seats			Full Council	
Liberal Party	20,023 (51.3%)	▲6.3	9 (56.2%)	9 / 16	▲1	35 (54.7%)	35 / 64
Conservative Party	18,654 (47.8%)	▼7.2	7 (43.8%)	7 / 16	▼1	29 (45.3%)	29 / 64
Independent	365 (0.9%)	N/A	0 (0.0%)	0 / 16	N/A	0 (0.0%)	0 / 64

=== Full council ===
↓
35	29

=== Aldermen ===
↓
10	6

=== Councillors ===
↓
25	23

== Ward results ==
=== All Saints' ===
All Saints'
Party	Candidate	Votes	%	±%
Liberal	C. Walker	1,257	59.5	+10.3
Conservative	J. E. Middlehurst	856	40.5	−10.3
Majority		401	19.0	
Turnout		2,113		
Liberal hold		Swing		

=== Ardwick ===
Ardwick
Party	Candidate	Votes	%	±%
Conservative	R. K. Payne	1,945	58.8	−2.3
Liberal	C. Preston	1,270	38.4	−0.5
Independent	H. Payne	35	1.0	N/A
Independent	J. Buxton Payne	30	0.9	N/A
Independent	J. Brown Payne	29	0.9	N/A
Majority		675	20.4	−1.8
Turnout		3,309		
Conservative gain from Liberal		Swing		

=== Cheetham ===
Cheetham
Party	Candidate	Votes	%	±%
Conservative	J. Croston*	1,111	52.3	+37.7
Liberal	J. Phythian	1,015	47.7	−37.7
Majority		96	4.6	
Turnout		2,126		
Conservative hold		Swing		

=== Collegiate Church ===
Collegiate Church
Party	Candidate	Votes	%	±%
Liberal	T. S. Muirhead*	uncontested		
Liberal hold		Swing		

=== Exchange ===
Exchange
Party	Candidate	Votes	%	±%
Liberal	W. Batty*	372*	50.0	−15.3
Conservative	J. Neild*	372	50.0	+15.3
Majority		0	0.0	−30.6
Turnout		744		
Liberal gain from Conservative		Swing		

* Two candidates having received 372 votes each, Batty was returned on the Alderman's casting vote

=== Medlock Street ===
Medlock Street
Party	Candidate	Votes	%	±%
Conservative	J. Marshall*	1,691	52.3	+2.4
Liberal	H. F. Blair	1,542	47.7	−2.4
Majority		149	4.6	
Turnout		3,233		
Conservative hold		Swing		

=== New Cross ===
New Cross
Party	Candidate	Votes	%	±%
Liberal	C. Stewart	3,117	54.0	+6.5
Liberal	T. Bright	2,928	50.7	+3.2
Conservative	T. Greenwood*	2,802	48.5	−6.2
Conservative	J. Grantham	2,703	46.8	−7.9
Majority		126	2.2	
Turnout		5,776		
Liberal gain from Conservative		Swing		
Liberal gain from Conservative		Swing		

=== Oxford ===
Oxford
Party	Candidate	Votes	%	±%
Conservative	L. Rostron*	540	51.6	+4.2
Liberal	J. W. Southern	506	48.4	−4.2
Majority		34	3.2	
Turnout		1,046		
Conservative hold		Swing		

=== St. Ann's ===
St. Ann's
Party	Candidate	Votes	%	±%
Liberal	J. Fox Turner*	489	63.3	−6.7
Conservative	J. F. Milne	283	36.7	+6.7
Majority		206	26.6	−13.4
Turnout		772		
Liberal hold		Swing		

=== St. Clement's ===
St. Clement's
Party	Candidate	Votes	%	±%
Liberal	T. A. Bazley	1,100	55.4	+20.0
Conservative	J. W. Whitaker*	837	42.1	−22.5
Independent	C. H. Bazley	50	2.5	N/A
Majority		263	13.3	
Turnout		1,987		
Liberal gain from Conservative		Swing		

=== St. George's ===
St. George's
Party	Candidate	Votes	%	±%
Liberal	W. Birch	2,262	62.2	N/A
Conservative	S. Latham	1,377	37.8	N/A
Majority		885	24.4	N/A
Turnout		3,639		
Liberal hold		Swing		

=== St. James' ===
St. James'
Party	Candidate	Votes	%	±%
Conservative	R. Lovatt Reade	694	50.8	N/A
Liberal	P. Goldschmidt*	671	49.2	N/A
Majority		23	1.6	N/A
Turnout		1,365		
Conservative gain from Liberal		Swing		

=== St. John's ===
St. John's
Party	Candidate	Votes	%	±%
Conservative	J. Smith	830	59.0	+15.1
Liberal	J. R. Hampson*	576	41.0	−15.1
Majority		254	18.0	
Turnout		1,406		
Conservative gain from Liberal		Swing		

=== St. Luke's ===
St. Luke's
Party	Candidate	Votes	%	±%
Conservative	R. Hope	206	85.5	+33.7
Independent	J. Walton	35	14.5	N/A
Majority		171	71.0	+67.4
Turnout		241		
Conservative hold		Swing		

=== St. Michael's ===
St. Michael's
Party	Candidate	Votes	%	±%
Liberal	W. Brown*	2,918	52.9	+5.1
Conservative	G. Moulton	2,407	43.7	−8.5
Independent	J. Barber	114	2.1	N/A
Independent	S. Brown	29	0.5	N/A
Independent	W. T. Brown	23	0.4	N/A
Independent	W. Brown	20	0.4	N/A
Majority		511	9.2	
Turnout		5,511		
Liberal hold		Swing		
