= Exchange (Manchester ward) =

- Ward
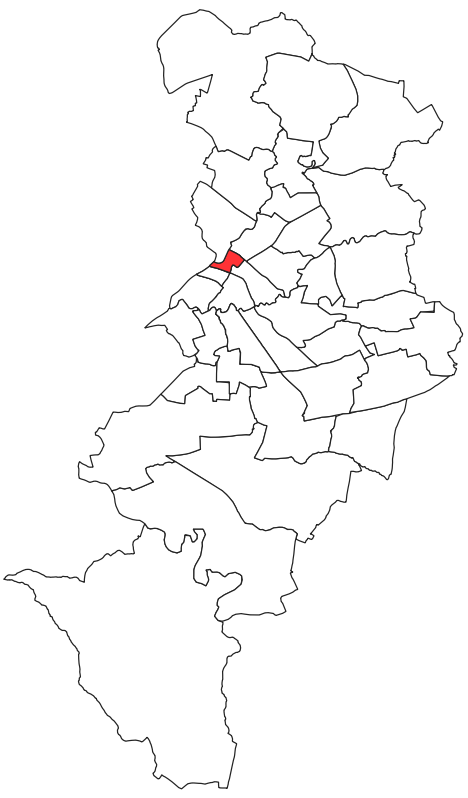
- Exchange ward (1931) within Manchester

- Coat of arms
- Country: United Kingdom
- Constituent country: England
- Region: North West England
- County borough: Manchester
- Created: December 1838
- Named for: Royal Exchange

Government
  - Type: Unicameral
  - Body: Manchester City Council
- UK Parliamentary Constituency: Manchester Exchange

Exchange was an electoral division of Manchester City Council which was represented from 1838 until 1950. It covered part of Manchester city centre including Exchange Square and Market Street.

== Overview ==
Exchange ward was one of the fifteen municipal wards created in 1838, when the Manchester Borough Council was granted a Charter of Incorporation under the provisions of the Municipal Corporations Act 1835.

Initially, the ward's boundaries corresponded with those of Districts No.6 (Exchange) and No.12 (St. Mary's) of the Manchester Township, which covered the area around Market Street in Manchester city centre. Its original boundaries remained in place until 1919 when that part of the ward to the south of St. Mary's Gate was transferred to the St. Ann's ward, and a part of the Collegiate Church ward around Smithfield Market Hall was transferred to Exchange. In 1950, the ward was abolished, and its area became part of the new St. Peter's ward.

From 1838 until 1885, the ward formed part of the Manchester Parliamentary constituency. From 1885 until 1918, it was part of the Manchester North West Parliamentary constituency. From 1918 until its abolition, it was part of the Manchester Exchange Parliamentary constituency.

== Councillors ==
Election	Councillor	Councillor	Councillor
1838	Edward Shawcross (Lib)	Elkanah Armitage (Lib)	Daniel Broadhurst (Lib)
1839	Edward Shawcross (Lib)	Elkanah Armitage (Lib)	William Burd (Lib)
1840	Edward Shawcross (Lib)	Elkanah Armitage (Lib)	William Burd (Lib)
1841	Richard Wilson (Lib)	Elkanah Armitage (Lib)	William Burd (Lib)
1842	Richard Wilson (Lib)	Samuel Satterthwaite (Lib)	William Rawson (Lib)
1843	Richard Wilson (Lib)	Samuel Satterthwaite (Lib)	William Rawson (Lib)
1844	Thomas Goadsby (Lib)	Samuel Satterthwaite (Lib)	William Rawson (Lib)
1845	Thomas Goadsby (Lib)	Samuel Satterthwaite (Lib)	William Rawson (Lib)
(1845–1872)
1872	G. Booth (Lib)	J. Neild (Con)	T. Warburton (Lib)
1873	G. Booth (Lib)	W. Batty (Lib)	T. Warburton (Lib)
1874	G. Booth (Lib)	W. Batty (Lib)	T. Warburton (Lib)
1875	G. Booth (Lib)	W. Batty (Lib)	T. Warburton (Lib)
1876	G. Booth (Lib)	W. Batty (Lib)	T. Warburton (Lib)
1877	G. Booth (Lib)	W. Batty (Lib)	J. R. Hampson (Lib)
1878	G. Booth (Lib)	W. Batty (Lib)	J. R. Hampson (Lib)
1879	J. Milling (Lib)	W. Batty (Lib)	J. R. Hampson (Lib)
1880	J. Milling (Lib)	W. Batty (Lib)	J. R. Hampson (Lib)
1881	J. Milling (Lib)	W. Batty (Lib)	J. R. Hampson (Lib)
1882	J. Milling (Lib)	W. Batty (Lib)	J. R. Hampson (Lib)
1883	J. Milling (Lib)	W. Batty (Lib)	J. R. Hampson (Lib)
1884	J. Milling (Lib)	W. Batty (Lib)	J. R. Hampson (Lib)
1885	J. Milling (Lib)	H. Rawson (Lib)	J. R. Hampson (Lib)
1886	J. Milling (Lib)	H. Rawson (Lib U)	J. R. Hampson (Lib)
1887	J. Milling (Lib)	H. Rawson (Lib U)	S. B. Worthington (Lib)
1888	J. Milling (Lib)	H. Rawson (Lib U)	S. B. Worthington (Lib)
1889	J. Milling (Lib)	H. Rawson (Lib U)	S. B. Worthington (Lib)
June 1890	J. G. Batty (Lib)	H. Rawson (Lib U)	S. B. Worthington (Lib)
1890	J. G. Batty (Lib)	H. Rawson (Lib U)	S. B. Worthington (Lib)
1891	J. G. Batty (Lib)	H. Rawson (Lib U)	S. B. Worthington (Lib)
1892	J. G. Batty (Lib)	H. Rawson (Lib U)	S. B. Worthington (Lib)
1893	J. G. Batty (Lib)	H. Rawson (Lib U)	S. B. Worthington (Lib)
August 1894	J. G. Batty (Lib)	F. Smallman (Lib)	S. B. Worthington (Lib)
1894	J. G. Batty (Lib)	F. Smallman (Lib)	S. B. Worthington (Lib)
1895	J. G. Batty (Lib)	F. Smallman (Lib)	S. B. Worthington (Lib)
1896	J. G. Batty (Lib)	F. Smallman (Lib)	T. Smethurst (Con)
1897	J. G. Batty (Lib)	F. Moss (Ind)	T. Smethurst (Con)
1898	J. G. Batty (Lib)	F. Moss (Ind)	T. Smethurst (Con)
1899	J. G. Batty (Lib)	F. Moss (Ind)	T. Smethurst (Con)
1900	J. G. Batty (Lib)	F. Moss (Ind)	T. Smethurst (Con)
1901	S. Cowan (Lib)	F. Moss (Ind)	T. Smethurst (Con)
1902	S. Cowan (Lib)	F. Moss (Ind)	T. Smethurst (Con)
1903	S. Cowan (Lib)	J. Makeague (Con)	T. Smethurst (Con)
1904	S. Cowan (Lib)	J. Makeague (Con)	T. Smethurst (Con)
1905	S. Cowan (Lib)	J. Makeague (Con)	T. Smethurst (Con)
1906	S. Cowan (Lib)	J. Makeague (Con)	T. Smethurst (Con)
1907	A. M. H. Gardiner (Ind)	J. Makeague (Con)	T. Smethurst (Con)
1908	A. M. H. Gardiner (Ind)	J. Makeague (Con)	T. Smethurst (Con)
1909	A. M. H. Gardiner (Ind)	J. Makeague (Con)	T. Smethurst (Con)
January 1910	A. M. H. Gardiner (Ind)	J. Makeague (Con)	W. D. Batty (Lib)
1910	V. S. Wood (Lib)	J. Makeague (Con)	W. D. Batty (Lib)
1911	V. S. Wood (Lib)	J. Makeague (Con)	G. Westcott (Con)
1912	V. S. Wood (Lib)	J. Makeague (Con)	G. Westcott (Con)
1913	V. S. Wood (Lib)	J. Makeague (Con)	G. Westcott (Con)
1914	V. S. Wood (Lib)	J. Makeague (Con)	G. Westcott (Con)
1919	V. S. Wood (Lib)	G. L. Hardcastle (Con)	G. Westcott (Con)
1920	V. S. Wood (Lib)	G. L. Hardcastle (Con)	G. Westcott (Con)
1921	V. S. Wood (Lib)	G. L. Hardcastle (Con)	G. Westcott (Con)
1922	V. S. Wood (Lib)	G. L. Hardcastle (Con)	G. Westcott (Con)
1923	A. S. Harper (Con)	G. L. Hardcastle (Con)	G. Westcott (Con)
1924	A. S. Harper (Con)	G. L. Hardcastle (Con)	G. Westcott (Con)
1925	A. S. Harper (Con)	G. L. Hardcastle (Con)	G. Westcott (Con)
1926	A. S. Harper (Con)	G. L. Hardcastle (Con)	G. Westcott (Con)
1927	A. S. Harper (Con)	G. L. Hardcastle (Con)	G. Westcott (Con)
1928	A. S. Harper (Con)	G. L. Hardcastle (Con)	G. Westcott (Con)
1929	A. S. Harper (Con)	G. L. Hardcastle (Con)	G. Westcott (Con)
1930	A. S. Harper (Con)	G. L. Hardcastle (Con)	G. Westcott (Con)
1931	A. S. Harper (Con)	G. L. Hardcastle (Con)	G. Westcott (Con)
November 1931	A. S. Harper (Con)	G. L. Hardcastle (Con)	C. F. Terry (Con)
1932	A. S. Harper (Con)	G. L. Hardcastle (Con)	C. F. Terry (Con)
February 1933	A. S. Harper (Con)	T. A. Higson (Con)	C. F. Terry (Con)
1933	A. S. Harper (Con)	T. A. Higson (Con)	C. F. Terry (Con)
1934	A. S. Harper (Con)	T. A. Higson (Con)	C. F. Terry (Con)
1935	A. S. Harper (Con)	T. A. Higson (Con)	C. F. Terry (Con)
1936	A. S. Harper (Con)	T. A. Higson (Con)	C. F. Terry (Con)
1937	A. S. Harper (Con)	T. A. Higson (Con)	C. F. Terry (Con)
1938	J. W. Coe (Con)	T. A. Higson (Con)	C. F. Terry (Con)
1945	J. W. Coe (Con)	T. A. Higson (Con)	T. E. Bird (Con)
1946	J. W. Coe (Con)	T. A. Higson (Con)	T. E. Bird (Con)
1947	J. W. Coe (Con)	T. A. Higson (Con)	T. E. Bird (Con)
October 1948	R. H. Ackerley (Con)	T. A. Higson (Con)	T. E. Bird (Con)
1949	R. H. Ackerley (Con)	T. A. Higson (Con)	T. E. Bird (Con)
September 1949	R. H. Ackerley (Con)	T. C. Hewlett (Con)	T. E. Bird (Con)

== Elections ==
=== Elections in 1830s ===
==== December 1838 ====
1838 (3 vacancies)
Party	Candidate	Votes	%	±%
Liberal	Edward Shawcross	194	100.0	
Liberal	Elkanah Armitage	194	100.0	
Liberal	Daniel Broadhurst	194	100.0	
Turnout		194		
Liberal win (new seat)				
Liberal win (new seat)				
Liberal win (new seat)				

==== November 1839 ====
1839
Party	Candidate	Votes	%	±%
Liberal	William Burd*	uncontesed		
Liberal hold		Swing		

=== Elections in 1840s ===
==== November 1840 ====
1840
Party	Candidate	Votes	%	±%
Liberal	Elkanah Armitage*	uncontesed		
Liberal hold		Swing		

==== November 1841 ====
1841
Party	Candidate	Votes	%	±%
Liberal	Richard Wilson	uncontesed		
Liberal hold		Swing		

==== November 1842 ====
1842
Party	Candidate	Votes	%	±%
Liberal	William Rawson	uncontesed		
Liberal hold		Swing		

==== November 1843 ====
1843
Party	Candidate	Votes	%	±%
Liberal	Samuel Satterthwaite*	uncontesed		
Liberal hold		Swing		

==== November 1844 ====
1844
Party	Candidate	Votes	%	±%
Liberal	Thomas Goadsby*	uncontested		
Conservative	William Gibb	no votes		
Liberal hold		Swing		

==== November 1845 ====
1845
Party	Candidate	Votes	%	±%
Liberal	William Rawson*	uncontested		
Liberal hold		Swing		

=== Elections in 1870s ===
==== November 1872 ====
1872
Party	Candidate	Votes	%	±%
Liberal	T. Warburton*	471	65.3	
Conservative	T. Dale	250	34.7	
Majority		221	30.6	
Turnout		721		
Liberal hold		Swing		

==== November 1873 ====
1873
Party	Candidate	Votes	%	±%
Liberal	W. Batty*	372*	50.0	−15.3
Conservative	J. Neild*	372	50.0	+15.3
Majority		0	0.0	−30.6
Turnout		744		
Liberal gain from Conservative		Swing		

* Two candidates having received 372 votes each, Batty was returned on the Alderman's casting vote

==== November 1874 ====
1874
Party	Candidate	Votes	%	±%
Liberal	G. Booth*	382	64.5	+14.5
Conservative	W. Milner	210	35.5	−14.5
Majority		172	29.0	+29.0
Turnout		592		
Liberal hold		Swing		

==== November 1875 ====
1875
Party	Candidate	Votes	%	±%
Liberal	T. Warburton*	401	51.2	−13.3
Conservative	E. H. Downs	382	48.8	+13.3
Majority		19	2.4	−26.6
Turnout		783		
Liberal hold		Swing		

==== November 1876 ====
1876
Party	Candidate	Votes	%	±%
Liberal	W. Batty*	513	55.6	+4.4
Conservative	E. H. Downs	410	44.4	−4.4
Majority		103	11.2	+8.8
Turnout		923		
Liberal hold		Swing		

==== November 1877 ====
1877
Party	Candidate	Votes	%	±%
Liberal	G. Booth*	uncontested		
Liberal hold		Swing		

==== November 1878 ====
1878
Party	Candidate	Votes	%	±%
Liberal	J. R. Hampson*	uncontested		
Liberal hold		Swing		

==== November 1879 ====
1879
Party	Candidate	Votes	%	±%
Liberal	W. Batty*	uncontested		
Liberal hold		Swing		

=== Elections in 1880s ===
==== November 1880 ====
1880
Party	Candidate	Votes	%	±%
Liberal	J. Milling*	uncontested		
Liberal hold		Swing		

==== November 1881 ====
1881
Party	Candidate	Votes	%	±%
Liberal	J. R. Hampson*	uncontested		
Liberal hold		Swing		

==== November 1882 ====
1882
Party	Candidate	Votes	%	±%
Liberal	W. Batty*	uncontested		
Liberal hold		Swing		

==== November 1883 ====
1883
Party	Candidate	Votes	%	±%
Liberal	J. Milling*	uncontested		
Liberal hold		Swing		

==== November 1884 ====
1884
Party	Candidate	Votes	%	±%
Liberal	J. R. Hampson*	uncontested		
Liberal hold		Swing		

==== November 1885 ====
1885
Party	Candidate	Votes	%	±%
Liberal	H. Rawson*	uncontested		
Liberal hold		Swing		

==== November 1886 ====
1886
Party	Candidate	Votes	%	±%
Liberal	J. Milling*	uncontested		
Liberal hold		Swing		

==== November 1887 ====
1887
Party	Candidate	Votes	%	±%
Liberal	S. B. Worthington	409	53.5	N/A
Conservative	J. Kay	355	46.5	N/A
Majority		54	7.0	N/A
Turnout		764		
Liberal hold		Swing		

==== November 1888 ====
1888
Party	Candidate	Votes	%	±%
Liberal Unionist	H. Rawson*	uncontested		
Liberal Unionist hold		Swing		

==== November 1889 ====
1889
Party	Candidate	Votes	%	±%
Liberal	J. Milling*	uncontested		
Liberal hold		Swing		

=== Elections in 1890s ===
==== June 1890 (by-election) ====
By-election: 9 June 1890
Party	Candidate	Votes	%	±%
Liberal	J. G. Batty	uncontested		
Liberal hold		Swing		

==== November 1890 ====
1890
Party	Candidate	Votes	%	±%
Liberal	S. B. Worthington*	uncontested		
Liberal hold		Swing		

==== November 1891 ====
1891
Party	Candidate	Votes	%	±%
Liberal Unionist	H. Rawson*	uncontested		
Liberal Unionist hold		Swing		

==== November 1892 ====
1892
Party	Candidate	Votes	%	±%
Liberal	J. G. Batty*	411	56.5	N/A
Independent	D. P. Schloss	317	43.5	N/A
Majority		94	13.0	N/A
Turnout		728		
Liberal hold		Swing		

==== November 1893 ====
1893
Party	Candidate	Votes	%	±%
Liberal	S. B. Worthington*	367	61.8	+5.3
Independent	F. Moss	227	38.2	−5.3
Majority		140	23.6	+10.6
Turnout		594		
Liberal hold		Swing		

==== August 1894 (by-election) ====
By-election: 14 August 1894
Party	Candidate	Votes	%	±%
Liberal	F. Smallman	248	54.1	−7.7
Independent	F. Moss	210	45.9	+7.7
Majority		38	8.2	−15.4
Turnout		458		
Liberal gain from Liberal Unionist		Swing		

==== November 1894 ====
1894
Party	Candidate	Votes	%	±%
Liberal	F. Smallman*	346	50.7	−11.1
Conservative	R. Cooper	337	49.3	N/A
Majority		9	1.4	−22.2
Turnout		683		
Liberal hold		Swing		

==== November 1895 ====
1895
Party	Candidate	Votes	%	±%
Liberal	J. G. Batty*	358	51.6	+0.9
Conservative	R. Cooper	336	48.4	−0.9
Majority		22	3.2	+1.8
Turnout		694		
Liberal hold		Swing		

==== November 1896 ====
1896
Party	Candidate	Votes	%	±%
Conservative	T. Smethurst	379	51.0	+2.6
Liberal	R. Ramsbottom	364	49.0	−2.6
Majority		15	2.0	
Turnout		743		
Conservative gain from Liberal		Swing		

==== November 1897 ====
1897
Party	Candidate	Votes	%	±%
Independent	F. Moss*	464	64.3	N/A
Liberal Unionist	C. Hughes	258	35.7	N/A
Majority		206	28.6	
Turnout		722		
Independent hold		Swing		

==== November 1898 ====
1898
Party	Candidate	Votes	%	±%
Liberal	J. G. Batty*	uncontested		
Liberal hold		Swing		

==== November 1899 ====
1899
Party	Candidate	Votes	%	±%
Conservative	T. Smethurst*	uncontested		
Conservative hold		Swing		

=== Elections in 1900s ===
==== November 1900 ====
1900
Party	Candidate	Votes	%	±%
Independent	F. Moss*	uncontested		
Independent hold		Swing		

==== November 1901 ====
1901
Party	Candidate	Votes	%	±%
Liberal	S. Cowan*	uncontested		
Liberal hold		Swing		

==== November 1902 ====
1902
Party	Candidate	Votes	%	±%
Conservative	T. Smethurst*	uncontested		
Conservative hold		Swing		

==== November 1903 ====
1903
Party	Candidate	Votes	%	±%
Conservative	J. Makeague	449	68.0	N/A
Independent	F. Moss*	211	32.0	N/A
Majority		238	36.0	N/A
Turnout		660		
Conservative gain from Independent		Swing		

==== November 1904 ====
1904
Party	Candidate	Votes	%	±%
Liberal	S. Cowan*	uncontested		
Liberal hold		Swing		

==== November 1905 ====
1905
Party	Candidate	Votes	%	±%
Conservative	T. Smethurst*	uncontested		
Conservative hold		Swing		

==== November 1906 ====
1906
Party	Candidate	Votes	%	±%
Conservative	J. Makeague*	uncontested		
Conservative hold		Swing		

==== November 1907 ====
1907
Party	Candidate	Votes	%	±%
Independent	A. M. H Gardiner	353	53.3	N/A
Liberal	J. Broxap*	309	46.7	N/A
Majority		44	6.6	N/A
Turnout		662		
Independent gain from Liberal		Swing		

==== November 1908 ====
1908
Party	Candidate	Votes	%	±%
Conservative	T. Smethurst*	385	51.1	N/A
Liberal	P. Earley	369	48.9	+2.2
Majority		16	2.2	
Turnout		754		
Conservative hold		Swing		

==== November 1909 ====
1909
Party	Candidate	Votes	%	±%
Conservative	J. Makeague*	uncontested		
Conservative hold		Swing		

=== Elections in 1910s ===
==== January 1910 (by-election) ====
By-election: 13 January 1910
Party	Candidate	Votes	%	±%
Liberal	W. D. Batty	uncontested		
Liberal gain from Conservative		Swing		

==== November 1910 ====
1910
Party	Candidate	Votes	%	±%
Liberal	V. S. Wood	346	50.7	N/A
Conservative	T. B. Grimshaw	337	49.3	N/A
Majority		9	1.4	N/A
Turnout		683		
Liberal gain from Independent		Swing		

==== November 1911 ====
1911
Party	Candidate	Votes	%	±%
Conservative	G. Westcott	402	52.0	+2.7
Liberal	W. D. Batty*	371	48.0	−2.7
Majority		31	4.0	
Turnout		773		
Conservative gain from Liberal		Swing		

==== November 1912 ====
1912
Party	Candidate	Votes	%	±%
Conservative	J. Makeague*	uncontested		
Conservative hold		Swing		

==== November 1913 ====
1913
Party	Candidate	Votes	%	±%
Liberal	V. S. Wood*	uncontested		
Liberal hold		Swing		

==== November 1914 ====
1914
Party	Candidate	Votes	%	±%
Conservative	G. Westcott*	uncontested		
Conservative hold		Swing		

==== November 1919 ====
1919 (new boundaries)
Party	Candidate	Votes	%	±%
Conservative	G. L. Hardcastle*	440	73.1	
Liberal	G. Gill	162	26.9	
Majority		278	46.2	
Turnout		602	27.3	
Conservative hold		Swing		

=== Elections in 1920s ===
==== November 1920 ====
1920
Party	Candidate	Votes	%	±%
Liberal	V. S. Wood*	597	74.2	N/A
Conservative	W. Chapman	208	25.8	N/A
Majority		389	48.3	
Turnout		805	36.4	+9.1
Liberal hold		Swing		

==== November 1921 ====
1921
Party	Candidate	Votes	%	±%
Conservative	G. Westcott*	690	66.8	N/A
Liberal	J. Lyons	343	33.2	N/A
Majority		347	33.6	
Turnout		1,033	58.1	+21.7
Conservative hold		Swing		

==== November 1922 ====
1922
Party	Candidate	Votes	%	±%
Conservative	G. L. Hardcastle*	uncontested		
Conservative hold		Swing		

==== November 1923 ====
1923
Party	Candidate	Votes	%	±%
Conservative	A. S. Harper	560	58.6	N/A
Liberal	A. Nixon	395	41.4	N/A
Majority		165	17.2	N/A
Turnout		8,858		
Conservative gain from Liberal		Swing		

==== November 1924 ====
1924
Party	Candidate	Votes	%	±%
Conservative	G. Westcott*	uncontested		
Conservative hold		Swing		

==== November 1925 ====
1925
Party	Candidate	Votes	%	±%
Conservative	G. L. Hardcastle*	570	63.5	N/A
Liberal	E. Barker	327	36.5	N/A
Majority		243	27.0	N/A
Turnout		897	53.6	N/A
Conservative hold		Swing		

==== November 1926 ====
1926
Party	Candidate	Votes	%	±%
Conservative	A. S. Harper*	uncontested		
Conservative hold		Swing		

==== November 1927 ====
1927
Party	Candidate	Votes	%	±%
Conservative	G. Westcott*	uncontested		
Conservative hold		Swing		

==== November 1928 ====
1928
Party	Candidate	Votes	%	±%
Conservative	G. L. Hardcastle*	534	53.0	N/A
Liberal	W. A. Nixon	474	47.0	N/A
Majority		60	6.0	N/A
Turnout		1,008	61.4	N/A
Conservative hold		Swing		

==== November 1929 ====
1929
Party	Candidate	Votes	%	±%
Conservative	A. S. Harper*	uncontested		
Conservative hold		Swing		

=== Elections in 1930s ===
==== November 1930 ====
1930
Party	Candidate	Votes	%	±%
Conservative	G. Westcott*	uncontested		
Conservative hold		Swing		

==== November 1931 ====
1931
Party	Candidate	Votes	%	±%
Conservative	G. L. Hardcastle*	uncontested		
Conservative hold		Swing		

==== November 1931 (by-election) ====
By-election: 10 November 1931
Party	Candidate	Votes	%	±%
Conservative	C. F. Terry*	uncontested		
Conservative hold		Swing		

==== November 1932 ====
1932
Party	Candidate	Votes	%	±%
Conservative	A. S. Harper*	uncontested		
Conservative hold		Swing		

==== February 1933 (by-election) ====
By-election: 28 February 1933
Party	Candidate	Votes	%	±%
Conservative	T. A. Higson	414	76.2	N/A
Independent	A. R. F. Onions	129	23.8	N/A
Majority		285	52.4	N/A
Turnout		543		
Conservative hold		Swing		

==== November 1933 ====
1933
Party	Candidate	Votes	%	±%
Conservative	C. F. Terry*	uncontested		
Conservative hold		Swing		

==== November 1934 ====
1934
Party	Candidate	Votes	%	±%
Conservative	T. A. Higson*	uncontested		
Conservative hold		Swing		

==== November 1935 ====
1935
Party	Candidate	Votes	%	±%
Conservative	A. S. Harper*	uncontested		
Conservative hold		Swing		

==== November 1936 ====
1936
Party	Candidate	Votes	%	±%
Conservative	C. F. Terry*	uncontested		
Conservative hold		Swing		

==== November 1937 ====
1937
Party	Candidate	Votes	%	±%
Conservative	T. A. Higson*	uncontested		
Conservative hold		Swing		

==== November 1938 ====
1938
Party	Candidate	Votes	%	±%
Conservative	J. W. Coe	uncontested		
Conservative hold		Swing		

=== Elections in 1940s ===
==== November 1945 ====
1945
Party	Candidate	Votes	%	±%
Conservative	T. E. Bird*	253	88.8	N/A
Labour	M. C. Toner	32	11.2	N/A
Majority		221	77.6	N/A
Turnout		285	71.1	
Conservative hold		Swing		

==== November 1946 ====
1946
Party	Candidate	Votes	%	±%
Conservative	T. A. Higson*	221	93.6	+4.8
Labour	M. Gouldman	15	6.4	−4.8
Majority		206	87.2	+9.6
Turnout		236		
Conservative hold		Swing		

==== November 1947 ====
1947
Party	Candidate	Votes	%	±%
Conservative	J. W. Coe*	uncontested		
Conservative hold		Swing		

==== October 1948 (by-election) ====
By-election: 25 October 1948
Party	Candidate	Votes	%	±%
Conservative	R. H. Ackerley	uncontested		
Conservative hold		Swing		

==== May 1949 ====
1949
Party	Candidate	Votes	%	±%
Conservative	T. E. Bird*	uncontested		
Conservative hold		Swing		

==== September 1949 (by-election) ====
By-election: 7 September 1949
Party	Candidate	Votes	%	±%
Conservative	T. C. Hewlett	uncontested		
Conservative hold		Swing		

== See also ==
- Manchester City Council
- Manchester City Council elections
