= St. Luke's (Manchester ward) =

- Ward
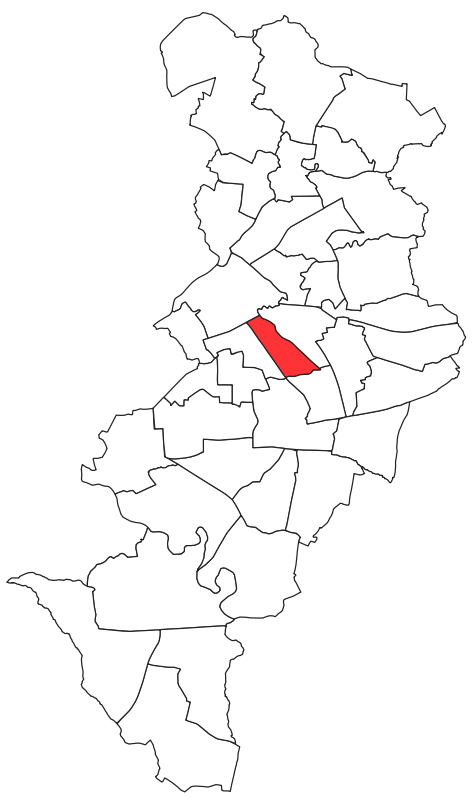
- St. Luke's ward (1954) within Manchester

- Coat of arms
- Country: United Kingdom
- Constituent country: England
- Region: North West England
- County borough: Manchester
- Created: December 1838
- Named for: St. Luke's

Government
  - Type: Unicameral
  - Body: Manchester City Council
- UK Parliamentary Constituency: Manchester Ardwick

St. Luke's was an electoral division of Manchester City Council which was represented from 1838 until 1971. It covered a part of Chorlton-on-Medlock.

== Overview ==
St. Luke's ward was one of the fifteen municipal wards created in 1838, when the Manchester Borough Council was granted a Charter of Incorporation under the provisions of the Municipal Corporations Act 1835.

Initially, the ward covered the eastern half of Chorlton-on-Medlock township, which had been absorbed into Manchester by the borough's Charter of Incorporation. Its original boundaries remained in place until 1919, when the ward's eastern boundary became Stockport Road. A further boundary revision took place in 1950, when that part of the ward to the north of Grosvenor Street was transferred to the new St. Peter's ward. The ward was abolished in 1971, with its remaining area area being transferred to the Ardwick ward.

From 1838 until 1885, the ward formed part of the Manchester Parliamentary constituency. From 1885 until 1918, it was split between the Manchester South and Manchester East Parliamentary constituencies. From 1918 until 1950, it was part of the Manchester Moss Side Parliamentary constituency. From 1950 until 1955, it was part of the Manchester Exchange Parliamentary constituency. From 1955 until its abolition, it was part of the Manchester Ardwick Parliamentary constituency.

== Councillors ==
Election	Councillor	Councillor	Councillor
1838	John Mayson (Lib)	Joseph Smith Grafton (Lib)	Thomas Broadbent (Lib)
1839	John Mayson (Lib)	Joseph Smith Grafton (Lib)	George Royle Chappell (Lib)
1840	John Mayson (Lib)	Joseph Smith Grafton (Lib)	George Royle Chappell (Lib)
1841	John Mayson (Lib)	Joseph Smith Grafton (Lib)	George Royle Chappell (Lib)
1842	John Mayson (Lib)	Joseph Smith Grafton (Lib)	Walter Clark (Lib)
1843	John Mayson (Lib)	Joseph Smith Grafton (Lib)	Walter Clark (Lib)
1844	John Mayson (Lib)	Joseph Smith Grafton (Lib)	Walter Clark (Lib)
1845	Cornelius Randall (Lib)	Joseph Smith Grafton (Lib)	Walter Clark (Lib)
(1845-1872)
1872	J. Eastwood (Con)	R. Hope (Con)	C. W. May (Con)
1873	J. Eastwood (Con)	R. Hope (Con)	C. W. May (Con)
1874	W. Scott Brown (Lib)	A. Murray (Lib)	C. W. May (Con)
1875	W. Scott Brown (Lib)	A. Murray (Lib)	C. W. May (Con)
1876	W. Scott Brown (Lib)	A. Murray (Lib)	C. W. May (Con)
1877	W. Scott Brown (Lib)	A. Murray (Lib)	C. W. May (Con)
1878	W. Scott Brown (Lib)	A. Murray (Lib)	C. W. May (Con)
1879	W. Scott Brown (Lib)	A. Murray (Lib)	C. W. May (Con)
1880	W. Scott Brown (Lib)	A. Murray (Lib)	C. W. May (Con)
1881	W. Scott Brown (Lib)	A. Murray (Lib)	C. W. May (Con)
1882	A. Marshall (Con)	J. Hoy (Lib)	C. W. May (Con)
1883	A. Marshall (Con)	J. Hoy (Lib)	C. W. May (Con)
1884	A. Marshall (Con)	J. Hoy (Lib)	J. W. Southern (Lib)
1885	A. Marshall (Con)	J. Hoy (Lib)	J. W. Southern (Lib)
1886	A. Marshall (Con)	J. Hoy (Lib)	J. W. Southern (Lib)
1887	A. Marshall (Con)	J. Hoy (Lib)	J. W. Southern (Lib)
1888	A. Marshall (Con)	J. Hoy (Lib)	J. W. Southern (Lib)
1889	A. Marshall (Con)	J. Hoy (Lib)	J. W. Southern (Lib)
1890	A. Marshall (Con)	J. Hoy (Lib)	J. W. Southern (Lib)
1891	A. Marshall (Con)	J. Hoy (Lib)	J. W. Southern (Lib)
1892	A. Marshall (Con)	J. Hoy (Lib)	J. W. Southern (Lib)
November 1892	T. Eggington (Lib)	J. Hoy (Lib)	J. W. Southern (Lib)
July 1893	T. Eggington (Lib)	W. J. Sinclair (Lib U)	J. W. Southern (Lib)
1893	T. Eggington (Lib)	W. J. Sinclair (Lib U)	J. W. Southern (Lib)
1894	T. Eggington (Lib)	W. J. Sinclair (Lib U)	J. W. Southern (Lib)
1895	C. O'Doherty (Lib)	W. J. Sinclair (Lib U)	J. W. Southern (Lib)
1896	C. O'Doherty (Lib)	W. J. Sinclair (Lib U)	J. W. Southern (Lib)
January 1897	C. O'Doherty (Lib)	W. J. Sinclair (Lib U)	H. Marsden (Lib)
1897	C. O'Doherty (Lib)	A. H. Scott (Lib)	H. Marsden (Lib)
1898	C. O'Doherty (Lib)	A. H. Scott (Lib)	H. Marsden (Lib)
1899	C. O'Doherty (Lib)	A. H. Scott (Lib)	H. Marsden (Lib)
1900	C. O'Doherty (Lib)	A. H. Scott (Lib)	H. Marsden (Lib)
1901	C. O'Doherty (Lib)	A. H. Scott (Lib)	H. Marsden (Lib)
1902	C. O'Doherty (Lib)	A. H. Scott (Lib)	H. Marsden (Lib)
May 1902	J. H. Thewlis (Lib)	A. H. Scott (Lib)	H. Marsden (Lib)
1903	J. H. Thewlis (Lib)	A. H. Scott (Lib)	H. Marsden (Lib)
1904	J. H. Thewlis (Lib)	A. H. Scott (Lib)	H. Marsden (Lib)
1905	J. H. Thewlis (Lib)	A. H. Scott (Lib)	H. Marsden (Lib)
1906	J. H. Thewlis (Lib)	J. Johnson (Con)	H. Marsden (Lib)
1907	J. H. Thewlis (Lib)	J. Johnson (Con)	H. Marsden (Lib)
1908	J. H. Thewlis (Lib)	J. Johnson (Con)	T. H. Hinchcliffe (Con)
1909	J. H. Thewlis (Lib)	J. Johnson (Con)	T. H. Hinchcliffe (Con)
1910	J. H. Thewlis (Lib)	J. Johnson (Con)	T. H. Hinchcliffe (Con)
1911	J. H. Thewlis (Lib)	J. Johnson (Con)	T. H. Hinchcliffe (Con)
1912	J. H. Thewlis (Lib)	J. Johnson (Con)	T. H. Hinchcliffe (Con)
1913	J. H. Thewlis (Lib)	J. Johnson (Con)	T. H. Hinchcliffe (Con)
1914	J. H. Thewlis (Lib)	J. Johnson (Con)	T. H. Hinchcliffe (Con)
1919	C. Herford (Lib)	J. Johnson (Con)	T. H. Hinchcliffe (Con)
1920	C. Herford (Lib)	J. Johnson (Con)	T. H. Hinchcliffe (Con)
1921	C. Herford (Lib)	J. Johnson (Con)	T. H. Hinchcliffe (Con)
1922	C. Herford (Lib)	J. Johnson (Con)	T. H. Hinchcliffe (Con)
August 1923	C. Herford (Lib)	T. R. Ackroyd (Lib)	T. H. Hinchcliffe (Con)
1923	J. W. Higginbottom (Con)	T. R. Ackroyd (Lib)	T. H. Hinchcliffe (Con)
1924	J. W. Higginbottom (Con)	T. R. Ackroyd (Lib)	T. H. Hinchcliffe (Con)
1925	J. W. Higginbottom (Con)	T. R. Ackroyd (Lib)	T. H. Hinchcliffe (Con)
November 1925	J. W. Higginbottom (Con)	T. R. Ackroyd (Lib)	T. Harrison (Con)
1926	J. W. Higginbottom (Con)	T. R. Ackroyd (Lib)	T. Harrison (Con)
1927	J. W. Higginbottom (Con)	T. R. Ackroyd (Lib)	T. Harrison (Con)
1928	J. W. Higginbottom (Con)	T. R. Ackroyd (Lib)	T. Harrison (Con)
1929	A. Mostyn (Lab)	T. R. Ackroyd (Lib)	T. Harrison (Con)
1930	A. Mostyn (Lab)	T. R. Ackroyd (Lib)	T. Harrison (Con)
1931	A. Mostyn (Lab)	T. R. Ackroyd (Lib)	T. Harrison (Con)
September 1932	A. Mostyn (ILP)	T. R. Ackroyd (Lib)	T. Harrison (Con)
1932	F. Tebb (Lib)	T. R. Ackroyd (Lib)	T. Harrison (Con)
1933	F. Tebb (Lib)	T. R. Ackroyd (Lib)	T. Harrison (Con)
1934	F. Tebb (Lib)	T. R. Ackroyd (Lib)	T. Harrison (Con)
1935	F. Tebb (Lib)	T. R. Ackroyd (Lib)	T. Harrison (Con)
1936	F. Tebb (Lib)	T. R. Ackroyd (Lib)	T. Harrison (Con)
1937	F. Tebb (Lib)	T. R. Ackroyd (Lib)	T. Harrison (Con)
June 1938	F. Tebb (Lib)	T. R. Ackroyd (Lib)	C. V. Jarvis (Con)
1938	J. Sharp (Con)	T. R. Ackroyd (Lib)	C. V. Jarvis (Con)
1945	J. H. Alsop (Lab)	J. Sharp (Con)	T. Ball (Lab)
1946	J. H. Alsop (Lab)	C. V. Jarvis (Con)	T. Ball (Lab)
1947	A. Holberry (Con)	C. V. Jarvis (Con)	T. Ball (Lab)
November 1948	A. Holberry (Con)	W. E. A. Yates (Con)	T. Ball (Lab)
1949	A. Holberry (Con)	W. E. A. Yates (Con)	J. F. Martin (Con)
1950	A. Holberry (Con)	W. E. A. Yates (Con)	J. F. Martin (Con)
1951	A. Holberry (Con)	W. E. A. Yates (Con)	J. F. Martin (Con)
1952	J. Conway (Lab)	W. E. A. Yates (Con)	W. Massey (Lab)
1953	J. Conway (Lab)	F. P. Evans (Lab)	W. Massey (Lab)
1954	J. Conway (Lab)	F. P. Evans (Lab)	W. Massey (Lab)
1955	J. Conway (Lab)	F. P. Evans (Lab)	M. J. Holberry (Con)
1956	J. Conway (Lab)	W. Massey (Lab)	M. J. Holberry (Con)
1957	J. Conway (Lab)	W. Massey (Lab)	M. J. Holberry (Con)
1958	J. Conway (Lab)	W. Massey (Lab)	S. C. Rimmer (Lab)
1959	J. Conway (Lab)	W. Massey (Lab)	S. C. Rimmer (Lab)
1960	W. Crabtree (Con)	W. Massey (Lab)	S. C. Rimmer (Lab)
1961	W. Crabtree (Con)	W. Massey (Lab)	S. C. Rimmer (Lab)
1962	W. Crabtree (Con)	W. Massey (Lab)	S. C. Rimmer (Lab)
1963	D. A. Warby (Lab)	W. Massey (Lab)	S. C. Rimmer (Lab)
1964	D. A. Warby (Lab)	W. Massey (Lab)	S. C. Rimmer (Lab)
1965	D. A. Warby (Lab)	W. Massey (Lab)	S. C. Rimmer (Lab)
1966	D. A. Warby (Lab)	W. Massey (Lab)	S. C. Rimmer (Lab)
1967	D. A. Warby (Lab)	W. Massey (Lab)	M. Pierce (Con)
1968	D. A. Warby (Lab)	T. Clinton (Con)	M. Pierce (Con)
1969	W. Massey (Lab)	T. Clinton (Con)	M. Pierce (Con)
1970	W. Massey (Lab)	T. Clinton (Con)	W. Egerton (Lab)

== Elections ==
=== Elections in 1830s ===
==== December 1838 ====
1838 (3 vacancies)
Party	Candidate	Votes	%	±%
Liberal	John Mayson	245	100.0	
Liberal	Joseph Smith Grafton	245	100.0	
Liberal	Thomas Broadbent	244	99.6	
Turnout		245		
Liberal win (new seat)				
Liberal win (new seat)				
Liberal win (new seat)				

==== November 1839 ====
1839
Party	Candidate	Votes	%	±%
Liberal	George Royle Chappell	uncontested		
Liberal hold		Swing		

=== Elections in 1840s ===
==== November 1840 ====
1840
Party	Candidate	Votes	%	±%
Liberal	Joseph Smith Grafton*	uncontested		
Liberal hold		Swing		

==== November 1841 ====
1841
Party	Candidate	Votes	%	±%
Liberal	John Mayson*	uncontested		
Liberal hold		Swing		

==== November 1842 ====
1842
Party	Candidate	Votes	%	±%
Liberal	Walter Clark*	uncontested		
Liberal hold		Swing		

==== November 1843 ====
1843
Party	Candidate	Votes	%	±%
Liberal	Josepth Smith Grafton*	uncontested		
Liberal hold		Swing		

==== November 1844 ====
1844
Party	Candidate	Votes	%	±%
Liberal	John Mayson*	uncontested		
Liberal hold		Swing		

==== November 1845 ====
1845
Party	Candidate	Votes	%	±%
Liberal	Walter Clark*	uncontested		
Liberal hold		Swing		

=== Elections in 1870s ===
==== November 1872 ====
1872
Party	Candidate	Votes	%	±%
Conservative	C. W. May	951	51.8	
Liberal	J. Duncan*	886	48.2	
Majority		65	3.6	
Turnout		1,837		
Conservative gain from Liberal		Swing		

==== November 1873 ====
1873
Party	Candidate	Votes	%	±%
Conservative	R. Hope	206	85.5	+33.7
Independent	J. Walton	35	14.5	N/A
Majority		171	71.0	+67.4
Turnout		241		
Conservative hold		Swing		

==== November 1874 ====
1874
Party	Candidate	Votes	%	±%
Liberal	W. Scott Brown	1,437	68.8	N/A
Conservative	J. Bardsley	653	31.2	−54.3
Majority		784	37.6	
Turnout		2,090		
Liberal gain from Conservative		Swing		

==== November 1875 ====
1875
Party	Candidate	Votes	%	±%
Conservative	C. W. May	1,306	57.3	+26.1
Liberal	C. Whiteley	974	42.7	−26.1
Majority		332	14.6	
Turnout		2,280		
Conservative hold		Swing		

==== November 1876 ====
1876
Party	Candidate	Votes	%	±%
Liberal	A. Murray*	1,333	51.1	+8.4
Conservative	W. Carter	1,278	48.9	−8.4
Majority		55	2.2	
Turnout		2,611		
Liberal hold		Swing		

==== November 1877 ====
1877
Party	Candidate	Votes	%	±%
Liberal	W. Scott Brown*	uncontested		
Liberal hold		Swing		

==== November 1878 ====
1878
Party	Candidate	Votes	%	±%
Conservative	C. W. May*	1,313	52.1	N/A
Liberal	J. Whiteley	1,208	47.9	N/A
Majority		105	4.2	N/A
Turnout		2,521		
Conservative hold		Swing		

==== November 1879 ====
1879
Party	Candidate	Votes	%	±%
Liberal	A. Murray*	uncontested		
Liberal hold		Swing		

=== Elections in 1880s ===
==== November 1880 ====
1880
Party	Candidate	Votes	%	±%
Liberal	W. Scott Brown*	uncontested		
Liberal hold		Swing		

==== November 1881 ====
1881
Party	Candidate	Votes	%	±%
Conservative	C. W. May*	uncontested		
Conservative hold		Swing		

==== November 1882 ====
1882
Party	Candidate	Votes	%	±%
Liberal	J. Hoy	uncontested		
Liberal hold		Swing		

==== November 1883 ====
1883
Party	Candidate	Votes	%	±%
Conservative	A. Marshall*	uncontested		
Conservative hold		Swing		

==== November 1884 ====
1884
Party	Candidate	Votes	%	±%
Liberal	J. W. Southern	1,883	61.1	N/A
Conservative	J. Towers	1,201	38.9	N/A
Majority		682	22.2	N/A
Turnout		3,084		
Liberal gain from Conservative		Swing		

==== November 1885 ====
1885
Party	Candidate	Votes	%	±%
Liberal	J. Hoy*	uncontested		
Liberal hold		Swing		

==== November 1886 ====
1886
Party	Candidate	Votes	%	±%
Conservative	A. Marshall*	uncontested		
Conservative hold		Swing		

==== November 1887 ====
1887
Party	Candidate	Votes	%	±%
Liberal	J. W. Southern*	uncontested		
Liberal hold		Swing		

==== November 1888 ====
1888
Party	Candidate	Votes	%	±%
Liberal	J. Hoy*	uncontested		
Liberal hold		Swing		

==== November 1889 ====
1889
Party	Candidate	Votes	%	±%
Conservative	A. Marshall*	uncontested		
Conservative hold		Swing		

=== Elections in 1890s ===
==== November 1890 ====
1890
Party	Candidate	Votes	%	±%
Liberal	J. W. Southern*	uncontested		
Liberal hold		Swing		

==== November 1891 ====
1891
Party	Candidate	Votes	%	±%
Liberal	J. Hoy*	uncontested		
Liberal hold		Swing		

==== November 1892 ====
1892
Party	Candidate	Votes	%	±%
Conservative	A. Marshall*	uncontested		
Conservative hold		Swing		

==== November 1892 (by-election) ====
By-election: 23 November 1892
Party	Candidate	Votes	%	±%
Liberal	T. Eggington	1,781	51.7	N/A
Conservative	G. McWilliams	1,666	48.3	N/A
Majority		115	3.4	N/A
Turnout		3,447		
Liberal gain from Conservative		Swing		

==== July 1893 (by-election) ====
By-election: 5 July 1893
Party	Candidate	Votes	%	±%
Liberal Unionist	W. J. Sinclair	1,776	53.2	N/A
Liberal	W. Champness	1,564	46.8	N/A
Majority		212	6.4	N/A
Turnout		3,340		
Liberal Unionist gain from Liberal		Swing		

==== November 1893 ====
1893
Party	Candidate	Votes	%	±%
Liberal	J. W. Southern*	1,835	84.1	N/A
Ind. Labour Party	S. McGregor	348	15.9	N/A
Majority		1,487	68.2	N/A
Turnout		2,183		
Liberal hold		Swing		

==== November 1894 ====
1894
Party	Candidate	Votes	%	±%
Liberal Unionist	W. J. Sinclair*	1,538	73.9	N/A
Ind. Labour Party	F. Leeming	542	26.1	+10.2
Majority		996	47.8	
Turnout		2,080		
Liberal Unionist hold		Swing		

==== November 1895 ====
1895
Party	Candidate	Votes	%	±%
Liberal	C. O'Doherty	1,828	58.0	N/A
Conservative	J. Grime	1,323	42.0	N/A
Majority		505	16.0	
Turnout		3,151		
Liberal hold		Swing		

==== November 1896 ====
1896
Party	Candidate	Votes	%	±%
Liberal	J. W. Southern*	1,828	58.0	N/A
Conservative	J. Grime	1,323	42.0	N/A
Majority		505	16.0	
Turnout		3,151		
Liberal hold		Swing		

==== January 1897 (by-election) ====
By-election: 11 January 1897
Party	Candidate	Votes	%	±%
Liberal	H. Marsden	uncontested		
Liberal hold		Swing		

==== November 1897 ====
1897
Party	Candidate	Votes	%	±%
Liberal	A. H. Scott	2,101	59.9	+1.9
Liberal Unionist	W. Sinclair*	1,406	40.1	N/A
Majority		695	19.8	+3.8
Turnout		3,507		
Liberal gain from Liberal Unionist		Swing		

==== November 1898 ====
1898
Party	Candidate	Votes	%	±%
Liberal	C. O'Doherty*	uncontested		
Liberal hold		Swing		

==== November 1899 ====
1899
Party	Candidate	Votes	%	±%
Liberal	H. Marsden*	uncontested		
Liberal hold		Swing		

=== Elections in 1900s ===
==== November 1900 ====
1900
Party	Candidate	Votes	%	±%
Liberal	A. H. Scott*	1,770	61.5	N/A
Conservative	W. Chapman	1,109	38.5	N.A
Majority		661	23.0	N/A
Turnout		2,879		
Liberal hold		Swing		

==== November 1901 ====
1901
Party	Candidate	Votes	%	±%
Liberal	C. O'Doherty*	uncontested		
Liberal hold		Swing		

==== November 1902 ====
1902
Party	Candidate	Votes	%	±%
Liberal	H. Marsden*	uncontested		
Liberal hold		Swing		

==== May 1903 (by-election) ====
By-election: 19 May 1903
Party	Candidate	Votes	%	±%
Liberal	J. H. Thewlis	1,355	50.6	N/A
Conservative	J. Johnson	1,321	49.4	N/A
Majority		34	1.2	N/A
Turnout		2,676		
Liberal hold		Swing		

==== November 1903 ====
1903
Party	Candidate	Votes	%	±%
Liberal	A. H. Scott*	1,683	51.4	N/A
Liberal Unionist	J. Stevenson	1,592	48.6	N/A
Majority		91	2.8	N/A
Turnout		3,275		
Liberal hold		Swing		

==== November 1904 ====
1904
Party	Candidate	Votes	%	±%
Liberal	J. H. Thewlis*	uncontested		
Liberal hold		Swing		

==== November 1905 ====
1905
Party	Candidate	Votes	%	±%
Liberal	H. Marsden*	uncontested		
Liberal hold		Swing		

==== November 1906 ====
1906
Party	Candidate	Votes	%	±%
Conservative	J. Johnson	1,574	57.6	N/A
Labour	T. Park	1,159	42.4	N/A
Majority		415	15.2	N/A
Turnout		2,733		
Conservative gain from Liberal		Swing		

==== November 1907 ====
1907
Party	Candidate	Votes	%	±%
Liberal	J. H. Thewlis*	uncontested		
Liberal hold		Swing		

==== November 1908 ====
1908
Party	Candidate	Votes	%	±%
Conservative	T. H. Hinchcliffe	1,545	52.8	N/A
Liberal	H. Marsden*	1,381	47.2	N/A
Majority		164	5.6	N/A
Turnout		2,926		
Conservative gain from Liberal		Swing		

==== November 1909 ====
1909
Party	Candidate	Votes	%	±%
Conservative	J. Johnson*	1,868	73.7	+20.9
Labour	A. Graham	668	26.3	N/A
Majority		1,200	47.4	+41.8
Turnout		2,536		
Conservative hold		Swing		

=== Elections in 1910s ===
==== November 1910 ====
1910
Party	Candidate	Votes	%	±%
Liberal	J. H. Thewlis*	1,607	52.0	N/A
Independent	H. M. Ross Clyne*	1,482	48.0	N/A
Majority		125	4.0	
Turnout		3,089		
Liberal hold		Swing		

==== November 1911 ====
1911
Party	Candidate	Votes	%	±%
Conservative	T. H. Hinchcliffe*	1,391	54.1	N/A
Liberal	E. B. A. Jones	1,182	45.9	−6.1
Majority		209	8.2	
Turnout		2,573		
Conservative hold		Swing		

==== November 1912 ====
1912
Party	Candidate	Votes	%	±%
Conservative	J. Johnson*	uncontested		
Conservative hold		Swing		

==== November 1913 ====
1913
Party	Candidate	Votes	%	±%
Liberal	J. H. Thewlis*	1,667	54.2	N/A
Conservative	A. E. B. Alexander	1,407	45.8	N/A
Majority		260	8.4	N/A
Turnout		3,074		
Liberal hold		Swing		

==== November 1914 ====
1914
Party	Candidate	Votes	%	±%
Conservative	T. H. Hinchcliffe*	uncontested		
Conservative hold		Swing		

==== November 1919 ====
1919 (new boundaries)
Party	Candidate	Votes	%	±%
Conservative	J. Johnson*	1,854	50.1	
NFDDSS	G. Milner	1,845	49.9	
Majority		9	0.2	
Turnout		3,699	37.4	
Conservative hold		Swing		

=== Elections in 1920s ===
==== November 1920 ====
1920
Party	Candidate	Votes	%	±%
Liberal	C. Herford*	2,227	64.4	N/A
Labour	W. H. Depledge	1,229	35.6	N/A
Majority		998	28.8	
Turnout		3,456	34.9	−2.5
Liberal hold		Swing		

==== November 1921 ====
1921
Party	Candidate	Votes	%	±%
Conservative	T. H. Hinchcliffe*	2,432	57.1	N/A
Labour Co-op	J. H. Alsop	1,828	42.9	+7.3
Majority		604	14.2	
Turnout		4,260	43.0	+8.1
Conservative hold		Swing		

==== November 1922 ====
1922
Party	Candidate	Votes	%	±%
Conservative	J. Johnson*	3,275	57.1	−2.8
Labour	E. Whiteley	1,620	26.8	−16.1
Independent	G. H. Greenhough	1,140	18.9	N/A
Majority		1,655	27.4	+13.2
Turnout		6,035	60.8	+17.8
Conservative hold		Swing		

==== August 1923 (by-election) ====
By-election: 15 August 1923
Party	Candidate	Votes	%	±%
Liberal	T. R. Ackroyd	2,232	55.4	N/A
Conservative	J. W. Higginbottom	1,138	28.2	−28.9
Co-operative Party	E. Whiteley	660	16.4	N/A
Majority		1,094	27.2	
Turnout		4,030		
Liberal gain from Conservative		Swing		

==== November 1923 ====
1923
Party	Candidate	Votes	%	±%
Conservative	J. W. Higginbottom	2,260	52.4	−4.7
Liberal	C. Herford*	2,053	47.6	N/A
Majority		207	4.8	−22.6
Turnout		4,313		
Conservative gain from Liberal		Swing		

==== November 1924 ====
1924
Party	Candidate	Votes	%	±%
Conservative	T. H. Hinchcliffe*	2,787	62.2	+9.8
Liberal	F. Tebb	1,692	37.8	−9.8
Majority		1,095	24.4	+19.6
Turnout		4,479		
Conservative hold		Swing		

==== November 1925 ====
1925
Party	Candidate	Votes	%	±%
Liberal	T. R. Ackroyd*	3,111	55.2	+17.4
Conservative	T. Harrison	2,522	44.8	−17.4
Majority		589	10.4	
Turnout		5,633	53.6	
Liberal hold		Swing		

==== November 1925 (by-election) ====
By-election: 24 November 1925
Party	Candidate	Votes	%	±%
Conservative	T. Harrison	2,120	55.4	+10.6
Liberal	F. Tebb	1,710	44.6	−10.6
Majority		410	10.8	
Turnout		3,830		
Conservative hold		Swing		

==== November 1926 ====
1926
Party	Candidate	Votes	%	±%
Conservative	J. W. Higginbottom*	1,989	54.4	+9.6
Liberal	W. T. O'Gorman	1,670	45.6	−9.6
Majority		319	8.8	
Turnout		3,659	35.1	−18.5
Conservative hold		Swing		

==== November 1927 ====
1927
Party	Candidate	Votes	%	±%
Conservative	T. Harrison*	2,129	50.9	−3.5
Liberal	W. T. O'Gorman	1,198	28.6	−17.0
Independent	L. C. Walker	838	20.0	N/A
Residents	A. R. Edwards	20	0.5	N/A
Majority		931	22.3	+13.5
Turnout		4,185	40.4	+5.3
Conservative hold		Swing		

==== November 1928 ====
1928
Party	Candidate	Votes	%	±%
Liberal	T. R. Ackroyd*	2,583	55.1	+26.5
Conservative	R. Harrison	1,478	31.5	−19.4
Labour	L. C. Walker	499	10.6	N/A
Residents	E. Walker	117	2.5	+2.0
Majority		1,105	23.6	
Turnout		4,632	46.1	+5.7
Liberal hold		Swing		

==== November 1929 ====
1929
Party	Candidate	Votes	%	±%
Labour	A. Mostyn	1,481	37.3	+26.7
Conservative	E. Davies	1,363	34.3	+2.8
Liberal	A. Coogan	807	20.3	−24.8
Residents	A. R. Edwards	46	1.1	−1.4
Majority		118	3.0	
Turnout		3,967	36.7	−9.4
Labour gain from Conservative		Swing		

=== Elections in 1930s ===
==== November 1930 ====
1930
Party	Candidate	Votes	%	±%
Conservative	T. Harrison*	2,504	63.7	+19.4
Labour	E. Davies	1,427	36.3	−1.0
Majority		1,077	27.4	
Turnout		3,931		
Conservative hold		Swing		

==== November 1931 ====
1931
Party	Candidate	Votes	%	±%
Liberal	T. R. Ackroyd*	3,236	78.4	N/A
Labour	E. Davies	892	21.6	−14.7
Majority		2,344	56.8	
Turnout		4,128	20.2	
Liberal hold		Swing		

==== November 1932 ====
1932
Party	Candidate	Votes	%	±%
Liberal	F. Tebb	1,789	53.2	−25.2
Labour	J. T. Wolfenden	1,472	43.8	+22.2
Communist	J. Ball	100	3.0	N/A
Majority		317	9.4	
Turnout		3,361		
Liberal gain from Ind. Labour Party		Swing		

==== November 1933 ====
1933
Party	Candidate	Votes	%	±%
Conservative	T. Harrison*	1,967	53.2	N/A
Labour	W. Taylor	1,727	46.8	+3.0
Majority		240	6.4	
Turnout		3,694		
Conservative hold		Swing		

==== November 1934 ====
1934
Party	Candidate	Votes	%	±%
Liberal	T. R. Ackroyd*	1,873	58.3	N/A
Labour	W. Taylor	1,341	41.7	−5.1
Majority		532	16.6	
Turnout		3,214		
Liberal hold		Swing		

==== November 1935 ====
1935
Party	Candidate	Votes	%	±%
Liberal	F. Tebb*	1,834	52.2	−6.1
Labour	W. Taylor	1,678	47.8	+6.1
Majority		156	4.4	−12.2
Turnout		3,512		
Liberal hold		Swing		

==== November 1936 ====
1936
Party	Candidate	Votes	%	±%
Conservative	T. Harrison*	2,094	53.7	N/A
Labour	W. Taylor	1,805	46.3	−1.5
Majority		289	7.4	
Turnout		3,899		
Conservative hold		Swing		

==== November 1937 ====
1937
Party	Candidate	Votes	%	±%
Liberal	T. R. Ackroyd*	2,028	60.5	N/A
Labour	W. Gallacher	1,325	39.5	−6.8
Majority		703	21.0	
Turnout		3,353		
Liberal hold		Swing		

==== June 1938 (by-election) ====
By-election: 30 June 1938
Party	Candidate	Votes	%	±%
Conservative	C. V. Jarvis	1,399	55.0	N/A
Labour	W. Gallacher	1,065	41.8	+2.3
Residents	A. M. Edwards	81	3.2	N/A
Majority		334	13.2	
Turnout		2,545		
Conservative hold		Swing		

==== November 1938 ====
1938
Party	Candidate	Votes	%	±%
Conservative	J. Sharp	1,562	43.7	N/A
Labour	W. Gallacher	1,262	35.3	−4.2
Liberal	G. E. Jones	719	20.1	−40.4
Residents	F. Vincent-Wain	33	0.9	N/A
Majority		300	8.4	
Turnout		3,576		
Conservative gain from Liberal		Swing		

=== Elections in 1940s ===
==== November 1945 ====
1945 (2 vacancies)
Party	Candidate	Votes	%	±%
Labour	T. Ball	1,842	45.5	+10.2
Labour	J. H. Alsop	1,832	45.2	+9.9
Conservative	C. V. Jarvis*	1,661	41.0	−2.7
Conservative	J. H. Willis	1,624	40.1	−3.6
Liberal	O. Heggs*	548	13.5	−6.6
Liberal	J. E. Moore	512	12.6	−7.5
Residents	E. Hutchinson	73	1.8	+0.9
Majority		171	4.2	
Turnout		4,051	27.1	
Labour gain from Conservative		Swing		
Labour gain from Liberal		Swing		

==== November 1946 ====
1946
Party	Candidate	Votes	%	±%
Conservative	C. V. Jarvis	2,354	49.4	+8.4
Labour	W. Wilson	2,019	42.4	−3.1
Liberal	J. E. Moore	392	8.2	−5.3
Majority		335	7.0	
Turnout		4,765		
Conservative hold		Swing		

==== November 1947 ====
1947
Party	Candidate	Votes	%	±%
Conservative	A. Holberry	4,209	58.9	+9.5
Labour	J. H. Alsop*	2,943	41.1	−1.3
Majority		1,266	17.8	+10.8
Turnout		7,152		
Conservative gain from Labour		Swing		

==== November 1948 (by-election) ====
By-election: 3 November 1948
Party	Candidate	Votes	%	±%
Conservative	W. E. A. Yates	3,233	52.7	−6.2
Labour	C. Blackwell	2,896	47.3	+6.2
Majority		337	5.4	−12.4
Turnout		6,129		
Conservative hold		Swing		

==== May 1949 ====
1949
Party	Candidate	Votes	%	±%
Conservative	J. F. Martin	3,495	55.9	−3.0
Labour	W. Massey	2,756	44.1	+3.0
Majority		739	11.8	−6.0
Turnout		6,251		
Conservative gain from Labour		Swing		

=== Elections in 1950s ===
==== May 1950 ====
1950 (new boundaries)
Party	Candidate	Votes	%	±%
Conservative	W. E. A. Yates*	2,778	51.9	
Labour	W. Massey	2,572	48.1	
Majority		206	3.8	
Turnout		5,350		
Conservative hold		Swing		

==== May 1951 ====
1951
Party	Candidate	Votes	%	±%
Conservative	A. Holberry*	3,052	60.0	+8.1
Labour	W. Massey	2,034	40.0	−8.1
Majority		1,018	20.0	+16.2
Turnout		5,086		
Conservative hold		Swing		

==== May 1952 ====
1952 (2 vacancies)
Party	Candidate	Votes	%	±%
Labour	W. Massey	3,580	57.1	+17.1
Labour	J. Conway	3,204	51.1	+11.1
Conservative	J. F. Martin*	2,952	47.1	−12.9
Conservative	M. Holberry	2,804	44.7	−15.3
Majority		252	4.0	
Turnout		6,270		
Labour gain from Conservative		Swing		
Labour gain from Conservative		Swing		

==== May 1953 ====
1953
Party	Candidate	Votes	%	±%
Labour	F. P. Evans	2,755	50.5	−6.6
Conservative	W. E. A. Yates*	2,698	49.5	+2.4
Majority		57	1.0	−3.0
Turnout		5,453		
Labour gain from Conservative		Swing		

==== May 1954 ====
1954
Party	Candidate	Votes	%	±%
Labour	J. Conway*	2,940	53.4	+2.9
Conservative	W. E. A. Yates	2,570	46.6	−2.9
Majority		370	6.8	+5.8
Turnout		5,510		
Labour hold		Swing		

==== May 1955 ====
1955
Party	Candidate	Votes	%	±%
Conservative	M. J. Holberry	2,398	50.4	+3.8
Labour	W. Massey*	2,358	49.6	−3.8
Majority		40	0.8	
Turnout		4,756		
Conservative gain from Labour		Swing		

==== May 1956 ====
1956
Party	Candidate	Votes	%	±%
Labour	W. Massey	2,280	57.8	+8.2
Conservative	N. Kenyon	1,667	42.2	−8.2
Majority		613	15.6	
Turnout		3,947		
Labour hold		Swing		

==== May 1957 ====
1957
Party	Candidate	Votes	%	±%
Labour	J. Conway*	2,240	55.6	−2.2
Conservative	W. Crabtree	1,792	44.4	+2.2
Majority		448	11.2	−4.4
Turnout		4,032		
Labour hold		Swing		

==== May 1958 ====
1958
Party	Candidate	Votes	%	±%
Labour	S. C. Rimmer	2,226	59.2	+3.6
Conservative	R. D. Doherty	1,531	40.8	−3.6
Majority		695	18.4	+7.2
Turnout		3,757		
Labour gain from Conservative		Swing		

==== May 1959 ====
1959
Party	Candidate	Votes	%	±%
Labour	W. Massey*	1,835	50.2	−9.0
Conservative	W. Crabtree	1,573	43.0	+2.2
Independent Labour	H. Rowley	249	6.8	N/A
Majority		262	7.2	−11.2
Turnout		3,657		
Labour hold		Swing		

=== Elections in 1960s ===
==== May 1960 ====
1960
Party	Candidate	Votes	%	±%
Conservative	W. Crabtree	1,313	43.9	+0.9
Labour	D. A. Warby	1,258	42.1	−8.1
Ratepayers	N. Robinson	418	14.0	N/A
Majority		55	1.8	
Turnout		2,989		
Conservative gain from Labour		Swing		

==== May 1961 ====
1961
Party	Candidate	Votes	%	±%
Labour	S. Rimmer*	1,733	53.9	+11.8
Conservative	M. J. Holberry	1,305	40.6	−3.3
Ratepayers	N. Robinson	179	5.6	−8.4
Majority		428	13.3	
Turnout		3,217		
Labour hold		Swing		

==== May 1962 ====
1962
Party	Candidate	Votes	%	±%
Labour	W. Massey*	1,896	63.7	+9.8
Conservative	W. Ricketts	981	33.0	−7.6
Union Movement	P. Edwards	99	3.3	N/A
Majority		915	30.7	+17.4
Turnout		2,976		
Labour hold		Swing		

==== May 1963 ====
1963
Party	Candidate	Votes	%	±%
Labour	D. A. Warby	1,831	63.1	−0.6
Conservative	W. Crabtree*	1,072	36.9	+3.9
Majority		759	26.2	−4.5
Turnout		2,903		
Labour gain from Conservative		Swing		

==== May 1964 ====
1964
Party	Candidate	Votes	%	±%
Labour	S. Rimmer*	1,501	68.6	+5.5
Conservative	M. E. Ford	688	31.4	−5.5
Majority		813	37.2	+11.0
Turnout		2,189		
Labour hold		Swing		

==== May 1965 ====
1965
Party	Candidate	Votes	%	±%
Labour	W. Massey*	1,164	64.4	−4.2
Conservative	M. A. Vince	520	28.8	−2.6
Communist	W. Cross	124	6.8	N/A
Majority		644	35.6	−1.6
Turnout		1,808		
Labour hold		Swing		

==== May 1966 ====
1966
Party	Candidate	Votes	%	±%
Labour	D. A. Warby*	916	68.1	+3.7
Conservative	M. Pierce	366	27.2	−1.6
Communist	W. Cross	63	4.7	−2.1
Majority		550	40.9	+5.3
Turnout		1,345		
Labour hold		Swing		

==== May 1967 ====
1967
Party	Candidate	Votes	%	±%
Conservative	M. Pierce	739	56.2	+29.0
Labour	S. C. Rimmer*	575	43.8	−24.3
Majority		164	12.4	
Turnout		1,314		
Conservative gain from Labour		Swing		

==== May 1968 ====
1968
Party	Candidate	Votes	%	±%
Conservative	T. Clinton	908	51.4	−4.8
Labour	W. Massey*	860	48.6	+4.8
Majority		48	2.7	−9.6
Turnout		1,768		
Conservative gain from Labour		Swing		

==== May 1969 ====
1969
Party	Candidate	Votes	%	±%
Labour	W. Massey	796	53.7	+5.1
Conservative	A. P. Osborn	686	46.3	−5.1
Majority		110	7.4	
Turnout		1,482		
Labour hold		Swing		

=== Elections in 1970s ===
==== May 1970 ====
1970
Party	Candidate	Votes	%	±%
Labour	W. Egerton	750	60.6	+6.9
Conservative	M. Pierce*	461	37.2	−9.1
Residents	P. Cuniffe	15	1.2	N/A
Residents	G. Nevins	12	1.0	N/A
Majority		289	23.4	+16.0
Turnout		1,238		
Labour gain from Conservative		Swing		

== See also ==
- Manchester City Council
- Manchester City Council elections
