= Caroline Herford =

English educationist (1860–1945)

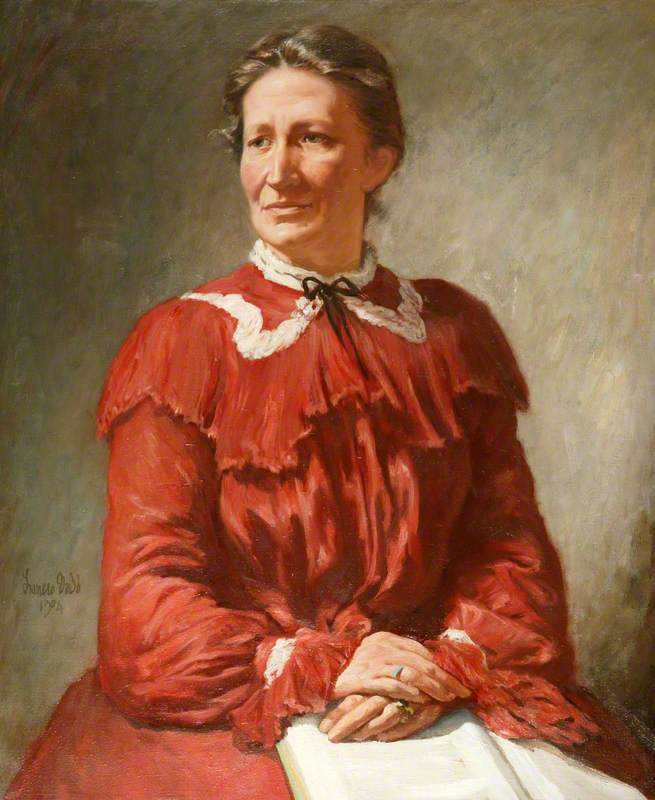
- by Francis Dodd
- Born: 1860
- Died: 1945 (aged 84–85); Great Missenden, England
- Occupation: Educationist
- Spouse: Robert Blake

Caroline Herford MBE, later Caroline Herford Blake (1860–1945) was an English educationist.

== Life ==
Herford was born in Lancaster on 1 November 1860, the daughter of Unitarian minister William Henry Herford and Elizabeth Anne Davis (died 1880). She was at Newnham College in 1885 and a year later she had a Mabchester University masters degree. From 1886 to 1907 she was headmistress of the Froebelian Lady Barn House School, which her father had founded in 1873. She was said to be one of the founders of Withington Girls' School in Manchester where she taught biology.

She also lectured at the Manchester Kindergarten Training College. Caring for her father until his death in 1908, Herford then lectured for a short time at University College, Reading. From 1910 to 1918 she was Lecturer in Education at Manchester University. She was a founding member of the Manchester University branch of the British Federation of University Women, and a member of Manchester City Council until defeated by a Conservative candidate in 1923.

In World War I she was a Red Cross Commandant, organising university students to meet ambulance trains. For this work she was awarded an MBE in 1919.

In 1924, Herford married Robert Blake (died 1931), and left Manchester to live with him in Somerset. She served on Somerset education committee. After his death she lived with a Manchester friend, Julia Sharpe, in Great Missenden. She died there on 16 March 1945.
