= William Batty (mayor) =

Manchester jeweller, clockmaker (1823 – 1893)

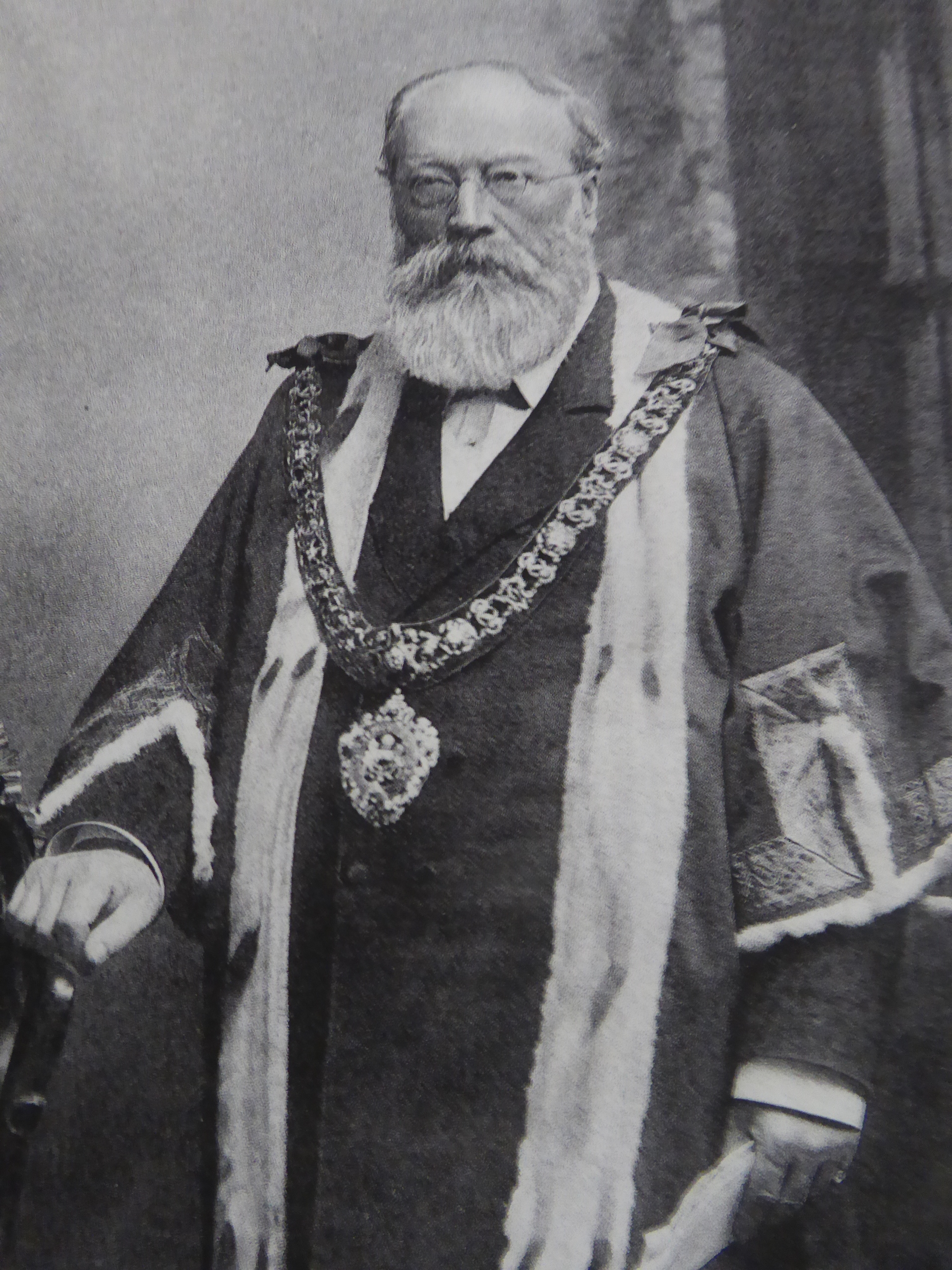
William Batty in 1888-89

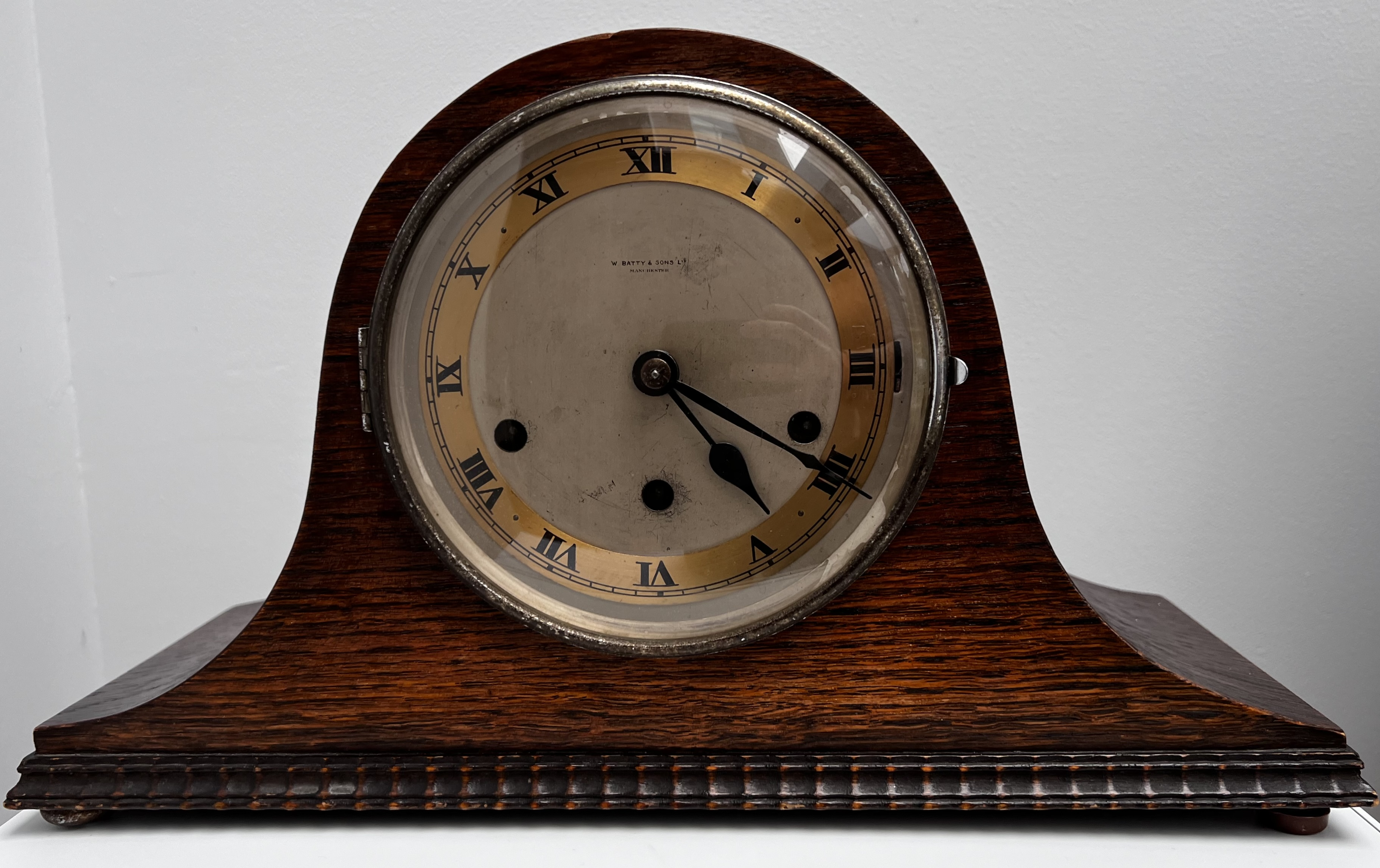
William Batty & Sons Ltd mantel clock, late 19th century

William Batty (1823 – 1893) was a Manchester jeweller, clockmaker and Lord Mayor of Manchester.

== Early life ==
William Batty was born in 1828, the youngest son of Rev. James Batty, a nonconformist congregationalist minister in the village of Dent, West Riding of Yorkshire. In 1835 James Batty had built the Zion Chapel in Dent, to house his nonconformist parishioners.

== Business career ==
William Batty began as a watchmakers' apprentice in the nearby town of Kirkby Lonsdale. He later moved to Manchester, initially living in a small room in a flat on Deansgate and working as a tradesman, repairing watches for local watch retailers. In 1853 opened his own shop at 10 Albert Place, Bridge Street, near the then-new Albert Bridge, and specialised in selling “high-class watches”.

In 1862 he opened large premises on Manchester's primary retail street, Market Street, selling high quality watches, clocks, diamonds, silver, gems and electroplate items. In 1873 he renamed his business William Batty & Son after taking into partnership his eldest son, James Batty (born 1843). He subsequently added another son, William Dent Batty (1857–1917), renaming the business William Batty & Sons.

Branches were later opened at 1 Cross Street in Manchester (1874), 135 Lord Street, Southport (1883) and 2, 3 & 5 St Georges Crescent, Liverpool (the latter under the name Penlington and Batty). At the start of the Second World War in 1939 the business was intending to move to new premises at 25 King Street.

== Alderman and Mayor ==
Batty entered Manchester City Council in 1868 as one of the representatives of All Saints' ward, and in 1884, on the death of the late Alderman Worthington he was raised to the position of alderman. As alderman he was one of the first advocates for the building of the Manchester Ship Canal, which he described as "one of the grandest schemes which has ever entered the mind of man."

He was elected as Lord Mayor in 1888 for one term. Notable events during his mayoralty included the July 1889 visit of Persian Shah Naser al-Din Shah Qajar, who attended Manchester Town Hall and the building works at the Manchester Ship Canal, as well as the stay of Irish nationalist William O'Brien. Batty was criticised for allowing O'Brien to stay at his own apartments at the Town Hall.

Batty had a keen and practical interest in the housing of the poor, and in the question of the formation of "Greater Manchester".

== Later work ==
For some years he resided in Moss Side, where he taught at the Radnor Street Wesleyan Chapel and Sunday School. He later moved to Chorlton-cum-Hardy, where in 1873, he gave a significant donation towards the building of the Chorlton-cum-Hardy Wesleyan chapel, today known as the Chorlton Methodist Church, of which he became one of the trustees and superintendent of the Sunday School.

== Family ==
Batty was married twice and had eleven sons.

His second wife was the daughter of the late Rev. Moses Rayner, a Wesleyan minister and missionary in Barbados prior to the 1833 Slavery Abolition Act.

== Gallery ==
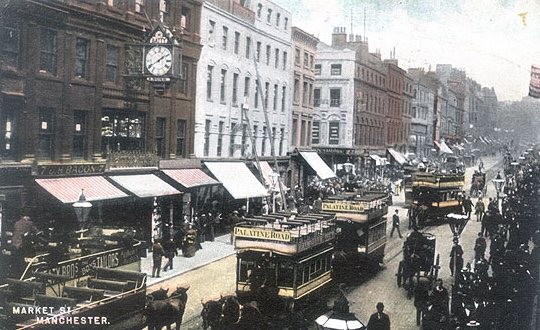
Market Street Manchester, c.1900

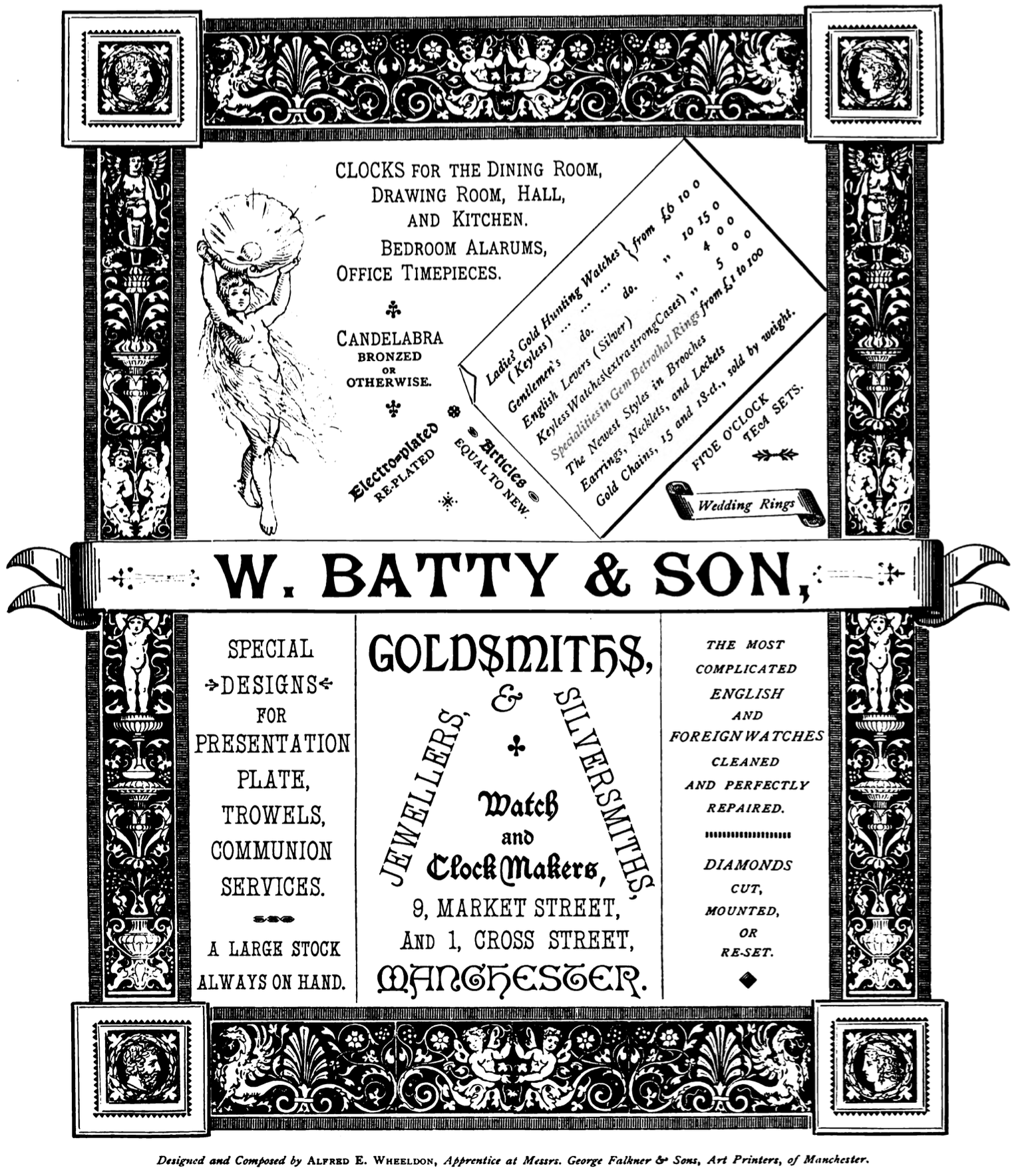
1883 advert

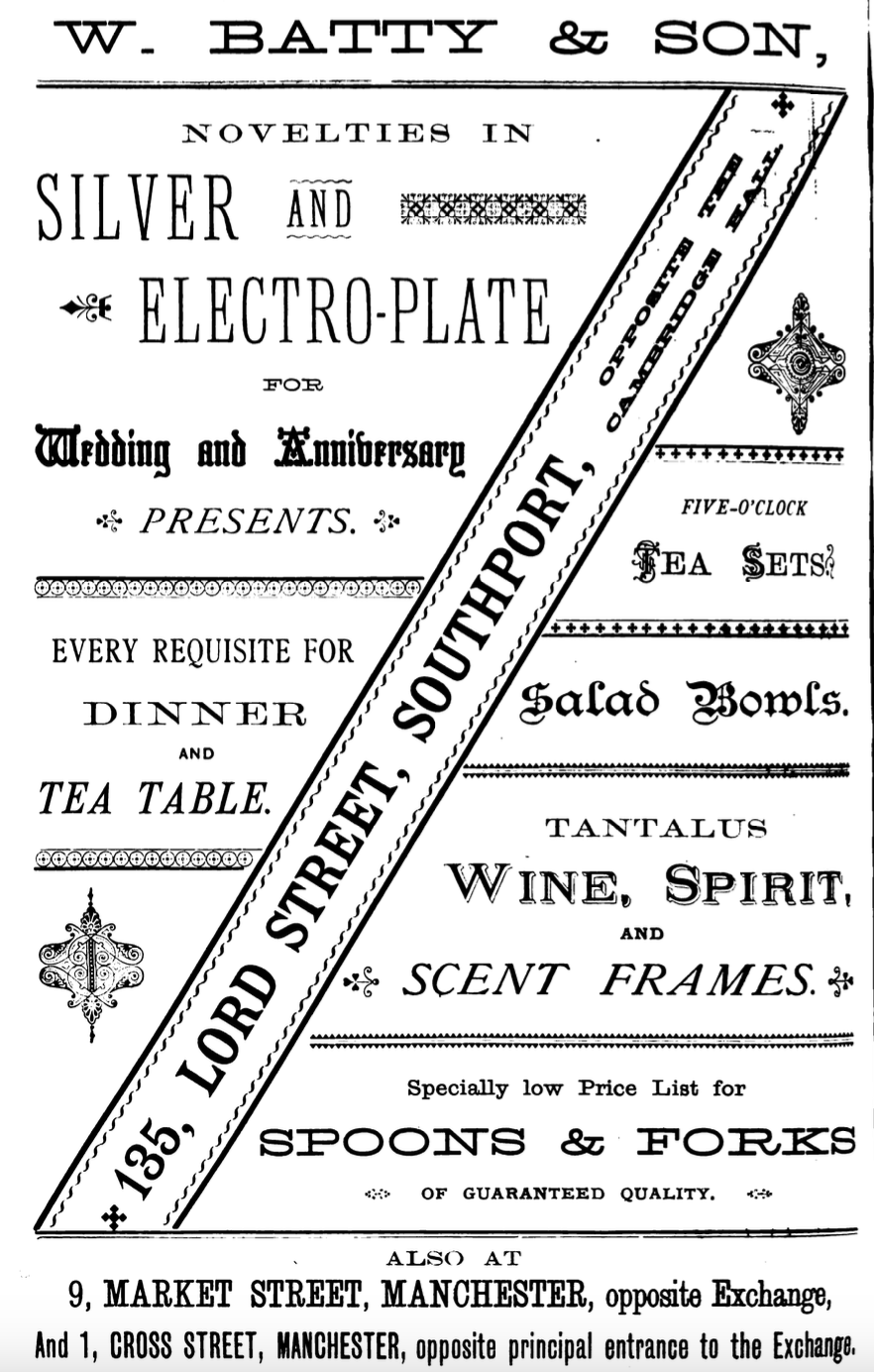
1883 advert

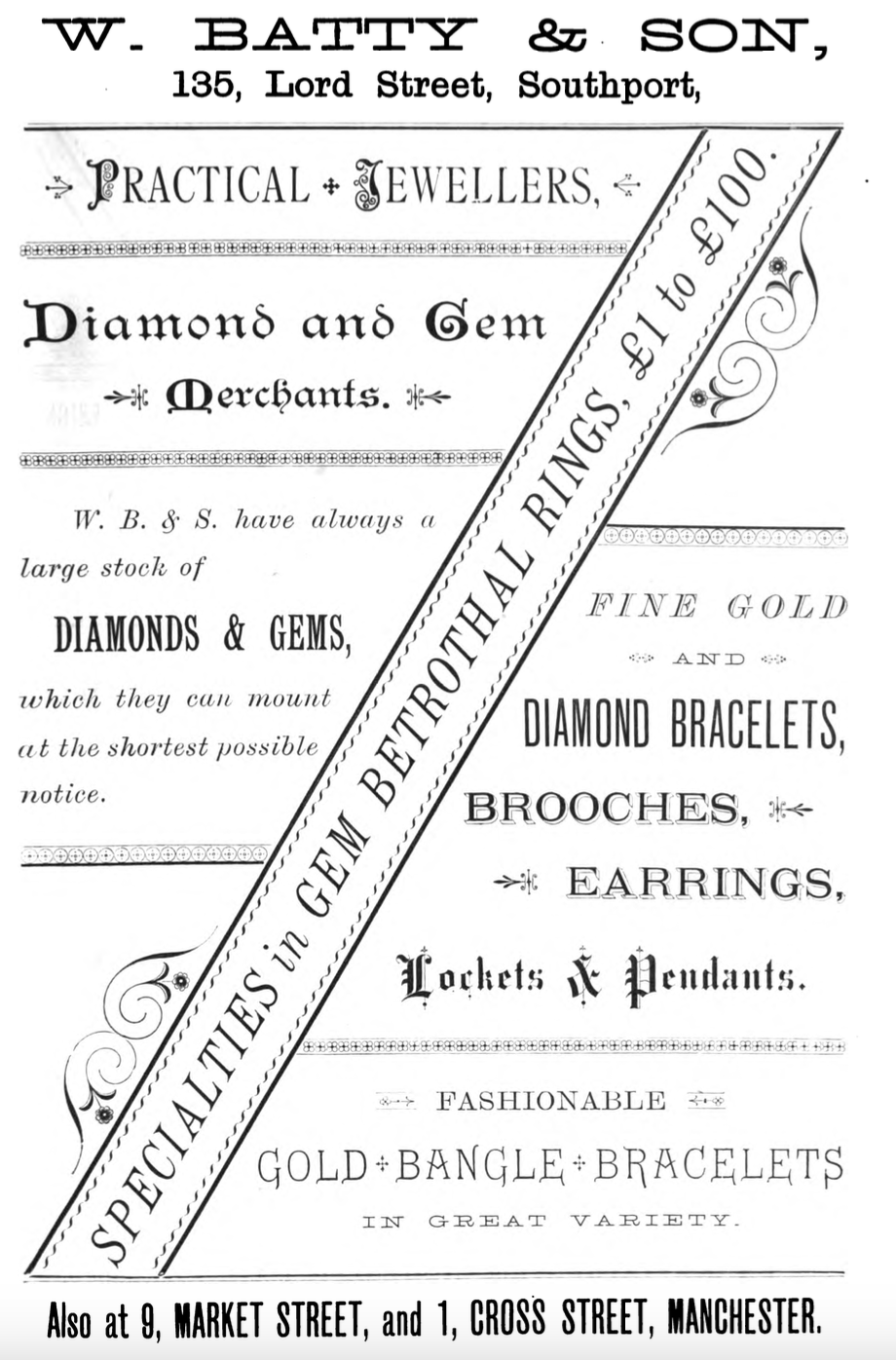
1883 advert

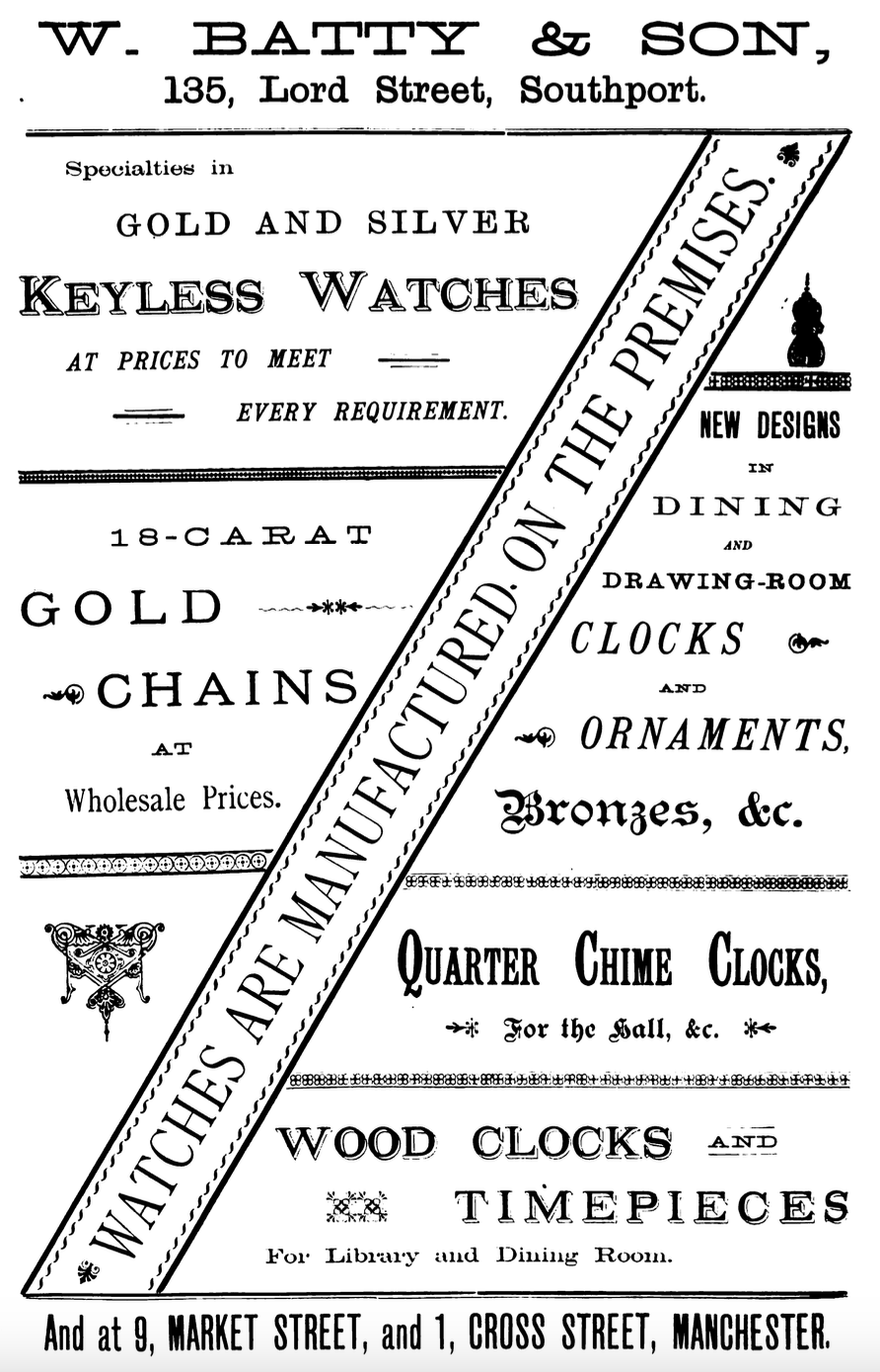
1883 advert

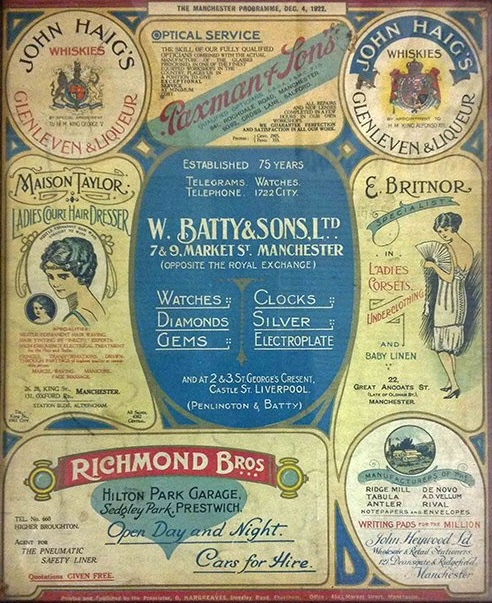
1922 advert

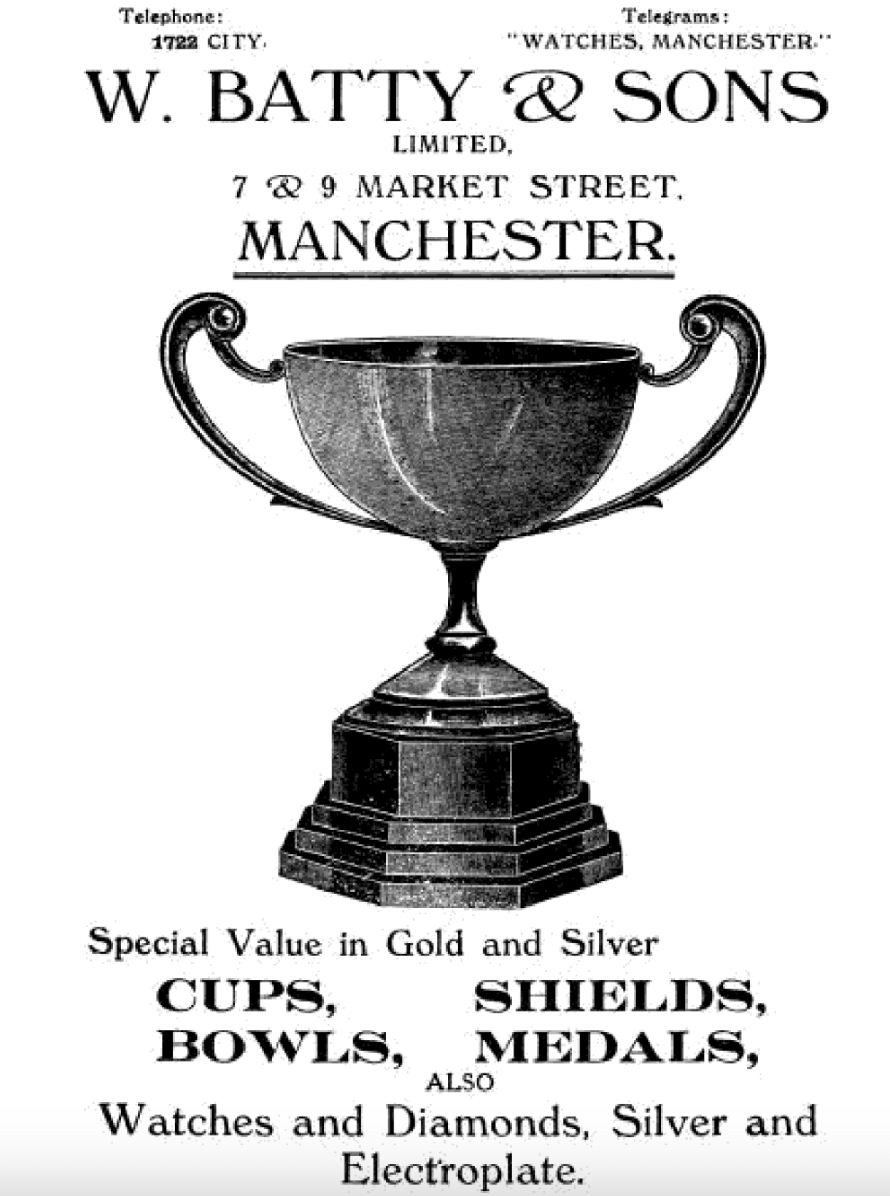
1926 advert
