= 1869 Manchester City Council election =

Local election in Manchester

- 1 November 1869

16 of 64 seats to Manchester City Council 33 seats needed for a majority

Elections to Manchester City Council were held on Monday, 1 November 1869. One third of the councillors seats were up for election, with each successful candidate to serve a three-year term of office.

== Ward results ==
=== All Saints' ===
All Saints'
Party	Candidate	Votes	%	±%
Conservative	Thomas Clowes*	759	74.7	N/A
Conservative	Richard Husband	257	25.3	N/A
Majority		502	49.4	N/A
Turnout		1,016		
Conservative hold		Swing		

=== Ardwick ===
Ardwick
Party	Candidate	Votes	%	±%
Conservative	Robert Whittaker	1,309	57.9	N/A
Conservative	Richard Hope*	950	42.1	N/A
Majority		359	15.8	
Turnout		2,259		
Conservative gain from Conservative		Swing		

=== Cheetham ===
Cheetham
Party	Candidate	Votes	%	±%
Liberal	John James Harwood*	1,046	59.7	N/A
Conservative	James Croston	707	40.3	N/A
Majority		339	19.4	N/A
Turnout		1,753		
Liberal hold		Swing		

=== Collegiate Church ===
Collegiate Church
Party	Candidate	Votes	%	±%
Liberal	Thomas Worthington*	743	51.0	−1.9
Conservative	Timothy Boddington	713	49.0	+1.9
Majority		30	2.0	−3.8
Turnout		1,456		
Liberal hold		Swing		

=== Exchange ===
Exchange
Party	Candidate	Votes	%	±%
Liberal	Thomas Warburton*	385	58.7	N/A
Conservative	James Sawley Brown	271	41.3	N/A
Majority		114	17.4	N/A
Turnout		656		
Liberal hold		Swing		

=== Medlock Street ===
Medlock Street
Party	Candidate	Votes	%	±%
Conservative	George Cunningham	1,280	56.1	N/A
Liberal	Mark Price	1,000	43.9	N/A
Majority		280	12.2	N/A
Turnout		2,280		
Conservative hold		Swing		

=== New Cross ===
New Cross
Party	Candidate	Votes	%	±%
Liberal	Charles Stewart	uncontested		
Conservative	Adam Woodward*	uncontested		
Liberal hold		Swing		
Conservative hold		Swing		

=== Oxford ===
Oxford
Party	Candidate	Votes	%	±%
Liberal	John Foulkes Roberts*	523	61.0	+33.5
Liberal	Frederick Clayton	335	39.0	+11.5
Majority		188	22.0	
Turnout		858		
Liberal hold		Swing		

=== St. Ann's ===
St. Ann's
Party	Candidate	Votes	%	±%
Liberal	Thomas Baker*	uncontested		
Liberal hold		Swing		

=== St. Clement's ===
St. Clement's
Party	Candidate	Votes	%	±%
Conservative	George Anderton	1,100	64.9	−1.9
Liberal	Josiah Taylor	595	35.1	+1.9
Majority		505	29.8	−3.8
Turnout		1,695		
Conservative gain from Liberal		Swing		

=== St. George's ===
St. George's
Party	Candidate	Votes	%	±%
Liberal	Thomas Schofield*	uncontested		
Liberal hold		Swing		

=== St. James' ===
St. James'
Party	Candidate	Votes	%	±%
Conservative	John Waterhouse*	uncontested		
Conservative hold		Swing		

=== St. John's ===
St. John's
Party	Candidate	Votes	%	±%
Conservative	William Livesley*	uncontested		
Conservative hold		Swing		

=== St. Luke's ===
St. Luke's
Party	Candidate	Votes	%	±%
Liberal	John Duncan	uncontested		
Liberal gain from Conservative		Swing		

=== St. Michael's ===
St. Michael's
Party	Candidate	Votes	%	±%
Conservative	Robert Thomas Walker	2,191	51.1	N/A
Liberal	George Frederick Kighley	2,098	48.9	N/A
Majority		93	2.2	N/A
Turnout		4,289		
Conservative hold		Swing		
