= 1859 Manchester City Council election =

Local election in Manchester

- 1 November 1859

16 of 64 seats to Manchester City Council 33 seats needed for a majority

Elections to Manchester City Council were held on Tuesday, 1 November 1859. One third of the councillors seats were up for election, with each successful candidate to serve a three-year term of office.

== Ward results ==
=== All Saints' ===
All Saints'
Party	Candidate	Votes	%	±%
Liberal	James Ryder*	uncontested		
Liberal hold		Swing		

=== Ardwick ===
Ardwick
Party	Candidate	Votes	%	±%
Conservative	Joseph Hardy	457	52.9	N/A
Liberal	Robert Rumney*	407	47.1	N/A
Majority		50	5.8	N/A
Turnout		864		
Conservative gain from Liberal		Swing		

=== Cheetham ===
Cheetham
Party	Candidate	Votes	%	±%
Liberal	James Bake*	uncontested		
Liberal hold		Swing		

=== Collegiate Church ===
Collegiate Church
Party	Candidate	Votes	%	±%
Liberal	William Horsfall	uncontested		
Liberal hold		Swing		

=== Exchange ===
Exchange
Party	Candidate	Votes	%	±%
	Edward Watkin	11	84.6	N/A
	Thomas Clegg	2	15.4	N/A
Majority		9	69.2	N/A
Turnout		13		
		Swing		

=== Medlock Street ===
Medlock Street
Party	Candidate	Votes	%	±%
Conservative	John Vertegans	785	61.4	N/A
Liberal	John Heywood	494	38.6	N/A
Majority		291	22.8	N/A
Turnout		1,279		
Conservative gain from		Swing		

=== New Cross ===
New Cross
Party	Candidate	Votes	%	±%
Conservative	Charles Ashmore	uncontested		
Conservative	John Gibson*	uncontested		
Conservative hold		Swing		
Conservative hold		Swing		

=== Oxford ===
Oxford
Party	Candidate	Votes	%	±%
Liberal	John King*	uncontested		
Liberal hold		Swing		

=== St. Ann's ===
St. Ann's
Party	Candidate	Votes	%	±%
	Robert Penny	248	41.2	N/A
	Maurice Fitzgerald	247	41.0	N/A
	Charles Affleck	107	17.8	N/A
Majority		1	0.2	N/A
Turnout		602		
	gain from Conservative	Swing		

=== St. Clement's ===
St. Clement's
Party	Candidate	Votes	%	±%
Conservative	William Gibbon Newton*	211	50.1	N/A
Liberal	John Kirkham	210	49.9	N/A
Majority		1	0.2	N/A
Turnout		421		
Conservative hold		Swing		

=== St. George's ===
St. George's
Party	Candidate	Votes	%	±%
Conservative	William Booth	uncontested		
Conservative hold		Swing		

=== St. James' ===
St. James'
Party	Candidate	Votes	%	±%
Liberal	Charles Sydney Grundy*	293	78.1	N/A
	Alexander W. Gilbody	82	21.9	N/A
Majority		211	56.2	N/A
Turnout		375		
Liberal hold		Swing		

=== St. John's ===
St. John's
Party	Candidate	Votes	%	±%
Conservative	Matthew Brougham*	uncontested		
Conservative hold		Swing		

=== St. Luke's ===
St. Luke's
Party	Candidate	Votes	%	±%
	Gordon McConnell*	uncontested		
		Swing		

=== St. Michael's ===
St. Michael's
Party	Candidate	Votes	%	±%
Liberal	Hugh Warburton	uncontested		
	Walter W. Woolsey	no votes		
Liberal gain from Conservative		Swing		
