= 1878 Manchester City Council election =

Local election in Manchester

- 1 November 1878

16 of 64 seats to Manchester City Council 33 seats needed for a majority
	First party	Second party
Party	Liberal	Conservative
Last election	10 seats, 55.0%	6 seats, 45.0%
Seats before	44	20
Seats won	10	6
Seats after	43	21
Seat change	▼1	▲1
Popular vote	3,100	3,018
Percentage	50.7%	49.3%
Swing	▼4.3%	▲4.3%
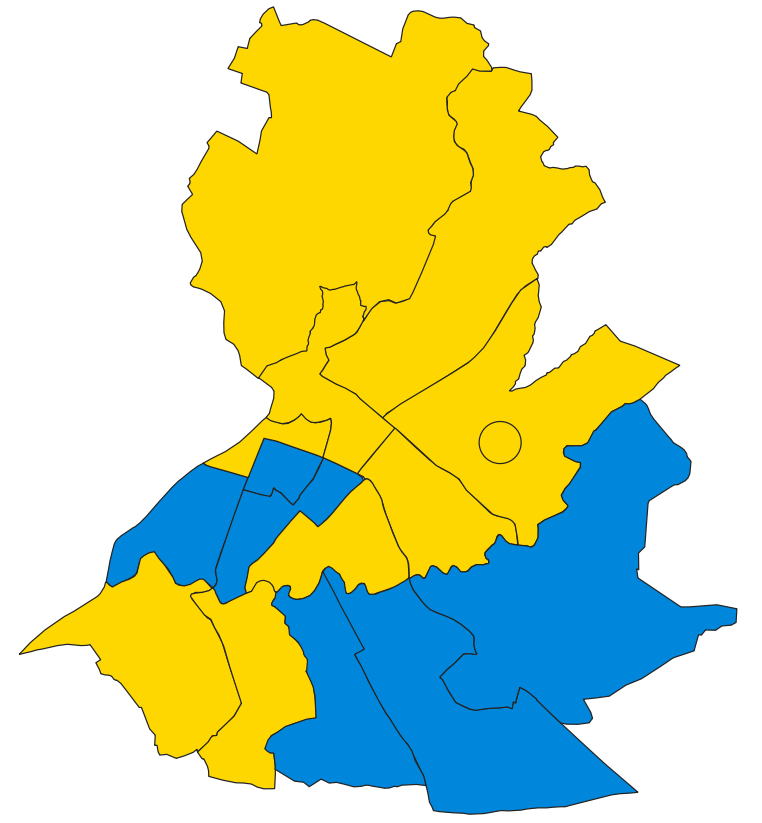
- Map of results of 1878 election
Leader of the Council before election
Liberal
Leader of the Council after election
Liberal

Elections to Manchester City Council took place on Friday, 1 November 1878. One third of the councillors seats were up for election, with each successful candidate to serve a three-year term of office. The Liberal Party retained overall control of the council.

== Election result ==
Party	Votes		Seats			Full Council	
Liberal Party	3,100 (50.7%)	▼4.3	10 (62.5%)	10 / 16	▼1	43 (67.2%)	43 / 64
Conservative Party	3,018 (49.3%)	▲4.3	6 (37.5%)	6 / 16	▲1	21 (32.8%)	21 / 64

=== Full council ===
↓
43	21

=== Aldermen ===
↓
11	5

=== Councillors ===
↓
32	16

== Ward results ==
=== All Saints' ===
All Saints'
Party	Candidate	Votes	%	±%
Conservative	T. Potts	942	50.3	N/A
Liberal	J. Whiteley	929	49.7	N/A
Majority		13	0.6	N/A
Turnout		1,871		
Conservative gain from Liberal		Swing		

=== Ardwick ===
Ardwick
Party	Candidate	Votes	%	±%
Conservative	G. H. Midwood*	uncontested		
Conservative hold		Swing		

=== Cheetham ===
Cheetham
Party	Candidate	Votes	%	±%
Liberal	J. J. Harwood*	uncontested		
Liberal hold		Swing		

=== Collegiate Church ===
Collegiate Church
Party	Candidate	Votes	%	±%
Liberal	T. Peel*	uncontested		
Liberal hold		Swing		

=== Exchange ===
Exchange
Party	Candidate	Votes	%	±%
Liberal	J. R. Hampson*	uncontested		
Liberal hold		Swing		

=== Medlock Street ===
Medlock Street
Party	Candidate	Votes	%	±%
Liberal	D. Greenwood*	uncontested		
Liberal hold		Swing		

=== New Cross ===
New Cross
Party	Candidate	Votes	%	±%
Liberal	G. Howarth*	uncontested		
Liberal	C. Rowley*	uncontested		
Liberal hold		Swing		
Liberal hold		Swing		

=== Oxford ===
Oxford
Party	Candidate	Votes	%	±%
Liberal	J. F. Roberts*	uncontested		
Liberal hold		Swing		

=== St. Ann's ===
St. Ann's
Party	Candidate	Votes	%	±%
Conservative	T. Rose*	uncontested		
Conservative hold		Swing		

=== St. Clement's ===
St. Clement's
Party	Candidate	Votes	%	±%
Liberal	E. Asquith*	963	55.8	N/A
Conservative	J. G. Shallcross	763	44.2	N/A
Majority		200	11.6	N/A
Turnout		1,726		
Liberal hold		Swing		

=== St. George's ===
St. George's
Party	Candidate	Votes	%	±%
Liberal	T. Schofield*	uncontested		
Liberal hold		Swing		

=== St. James' ===
St. James'
Party	Candidate	Votes	%	±%
Conservative	W. T. Windsor*	uncontested		
Conservative hold		Swing		

=== St. John's ===
St. John's
Party	Candidate	Votes	%	±%
Conservative	W. Livesley*	uncontested		
Conservative hold		Swing		

=== St. Luke's ===
St. Luke's
Party	Candidate	Votes	%	±%
Conservative	C. W. May*	1,313	52.1	N/A
Liberal	J. Whiteley	1,208	47.9	N/A
Majority		105	4.2	N/A
Turnout		2,521		
Conservative hold		Swing		

=== St. Michael's ===
St. Michael's
Party	Candidate	Votes	%	±%
Liberal	B. Brierley*	uncontested		
Liberal hold		Swing		
