= 1872 Manchester City Council election =

Local election in Manchester

- 1 November 1872

16 of 64 seats to Manchester City Council 33 seats needed for a majority
	First party	Second party
Party	Liberal	Conservative
Seats before	35	29
Seats won	8	8
Seats after	34	30
Seat change	▼1	▲1
Popular vote	13,625	16,644
Percentage	45.0%	55.0%
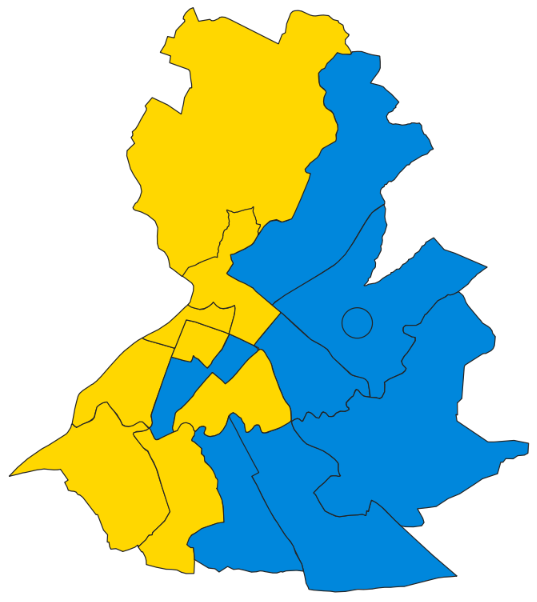
- Map of results of 1872 election
Leader of the Council before election
Liberal
Leader of the Council after election
Liberal

Elections to Manchester City Council were held on Friday, 1 November 1872. One third of the councillors seats were up for election, with each successful candidate to serve a three-year term of office. The Liberal Party retained overall control of the council.

== Election result ==
Party	Votes	Seats			Full Council	
Liberal Party	13,625 (45.0%)	8 (50.0%)	8 / 16	▼1	34 (53.1%)	34 / 64
Conservative Party	16,644 (55.0%)	8 (50.0%)	8 / 16	▲1	30 (46.9%)	30 / 64

=== Full council ===
↓
34	30

=== Aldermen ===
↓
10	6

=== Councillors ===
↓
24	24

== Ward results ==
=== All Saints' ===
All Saints'
Party	Candidate	Votes	%	±%
Conservative	T. Potts	806	50.8	
Liberal	T. Clowes*	782	49.2	
Majority		24	1.6	
Turnout		1,588		
Conservative gain from Liberal		Swing		

=== Ardwick ===
Ardwick
Party	Candidate	Votes	%	±%
Conservative	R. Whittaker*	1,672	61.1	
Liberal	H. Shaw	1,066	38.9	
Majority		606	22.2	
Turnout		2,738		
Conservative hold		Swing		

=== Cheetham ===
Cheetham
Party	Candidate	Votes	%	±%
Liberal	J. J. Harwood*	751	85.4	
Conservative	R. Bower	128	14.6	
Majority		623	70.8	
Turnout		879		
Liberal hold		Swing		

=== Collegiate Church ===
Collegiate Church
Party	Candidate	Votes	%	±%
Liberal	T. Worthington*	902	56.0	
Conservative	R. Simister	709	44.0	
Majority		193	12.0	
Turnout		1,611		
Liberal hold		Swing		

=== Exchange ===
Exchange
Party	Candidate	Votes	%	±%
Liberal	T. Warburton*	471	65.3	
Conservative	T. Dale	250	34.7	
Majority		221	30.6	
Turnout		721		
Liberal hold		Swing		

=== Medlock Street ===
Medlock Street
Party	Candidate	Votes	%	±%
Liberal	M. Price	1,430	50.1	
Conservative	G. Cunningham*	1,424	49.9	
Majority		6	0.2	
Turnout		2,854		
Liberal gain from Conservative		Swing		

=== New Cross ===
New Cross
Party	Candidate	Votes	%	±%
Conservative	A. Woodward*	2,982	54.7	
Conservative	W. G. Bennett	2,742	50.3	
Liberal	C. Stewart*	2,586	47.5	
Majority		156	2.8	
Turnout		5,448		
Conservative hold		Swing		
Conservative gain from Liberal		Swing		

=== Oxford ===
Oxford
Party	Candidate	Votes	%	±%
Liberal	J. F. Roberts*	537	52.6	
Conservative	J. Henstock	484	47.4	
Majority		53	5.2	
Turnout		1,021		
Liberal hold		Swing		

=== St. Ann's ===
St. Ann's
Party	Candidate	Votes	%	±%
Liberal	T. Baker*	476	70.0	
Conservative	J. E. Middlehurst	204	30.0	
Majority		272	40.0	
Turnout		680		
Liberal hold		Swing		

=== St. Clement's ===
St. Clement's
Party	Candidate	Votes	%	±%
Conservative	G. Anderton*	1,132	64.6	
Liberal	E. Asquith	621	35.4	
Majority		511	29.2	
Turnout		1,753		
Conservative hold		Swing		

=== St. George's ===
St. George's
Party	Candidate	Votes	%	±%
Liberal	T. Schofield*	uncontested		
Liberal hold		Swing		

=== St. James' ===
St. James'
Party	Candidate	Votes	%	±%
Conservative	J. Waterhouse*	uncontested		
Conservative hold		Swing		

=== St. John's ===
St. John's
Party	Candidate	Votes	%	±%
Liberal	J. Sawley Brown	799	56.1	
Conservative	W. Livesley*	626	43.9	
Majority		173	12.2	
Turnout		1,425		
Liberal gain from Conservative		Swing		

=== St. Luke's ===
St. Luke's
Party	Candidate	Votes	%	±%
Conservative	C. W. May	951	51.8	
Liberal	J. Duncan*	886	48.2	
Majority		65	3.6	
Turnout		1,837		
Conservative gain from Liberal		Swing		

=== St. Michael's ===
St. Michael's
Party	Candidate	Votes	%	±%
Conservative	R. T. Walker*	2,534	52.2	
Liberal	W. Cliff	2,318	47.8	
Majority		216	4.4	
Turnout		4,852		
Conservative hold		Swing		
