= 1881 Manchester City Council election =

Local election in Manchester

- 1 November 1881

16 of 64 seats to Manchester City Council 33 seats needed for a majority
	First party	Second party
Party	Liberal	Conservative
Last election	9 seats, N/A	7 seats, N/A
Seats before	42	22
Seats won	8	8
Seats after	41	23
Seat change	▼1	▲1
Popular vote	6,082	7,285
Percentage	43.5%	52.2%
Swing	N/A	N/A
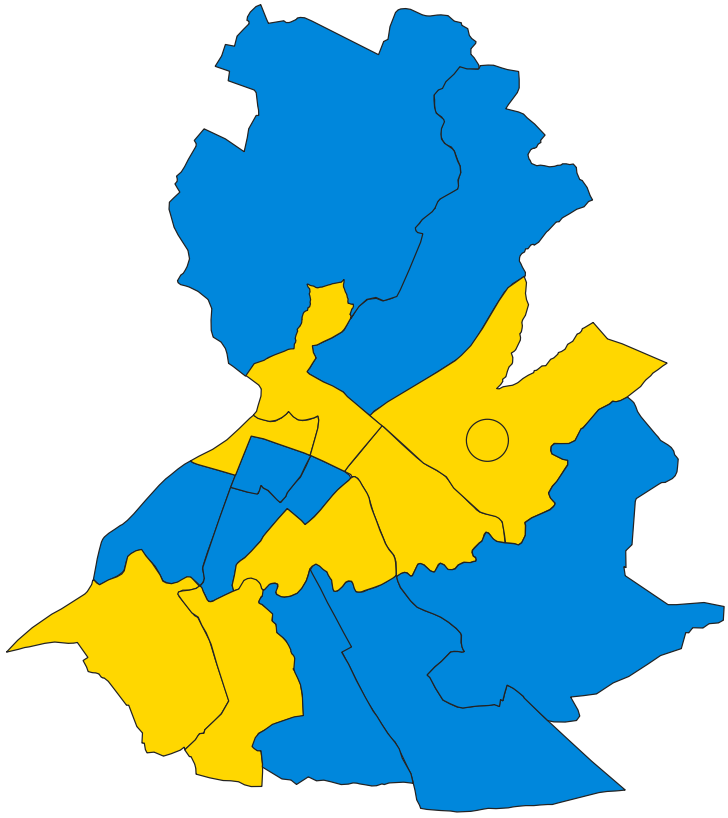
- Map of results of 1881 election
Leader of the Council before election
Liberal
Leader of the Council after election
Liberal

Elections to Manchester City Council took place on Tuesday, 1 November 1881. One third of the councillors seats were up for election, with each successful candidate to serve a three-year term of office. The Liberal Party retained overall control of the council.

== Election result ==
Party	Votes		Seats			Full Council	
Liberal Party	6,082 (43.5%)	N/A	8 (50.0%)	8 / 16	▼1	41 (64.1%)	41 / 64
Conservative Party	7,285 (52.2%)	N/A	8 (50.0%)	8 / 16	▲1	23 (35.9%)	23 / 64
Independent	596 (4.3%)	N/A	0 (0.0%)	0 / 16	N/A	0 (0.0%)	0 / 64

=== Full council ===
↓
41	23

=== Aldermen ===
↓
12	4

=== Councillors ===
↓
29	19

== Ward results ==
=== All Saints' ===
All Saints'
Party	Candidate	Votes	%	±%
Conservative	T. Potts*	853	58.9	N/A
Independent	C. J. Herford	596	41.1	N/A
Majority		257	17.8	N/A
Turnout		1,449		
Conservative hold		Swing		

=== Ardwick ===
Ardwick
Party	Candidate	Votes	%	±%
Conservative	J. Whittaker	2,139	53.9	N/A
Liberal	W. H. Hewitt	1,827	46.1	N/A
Majority		312	7.8	N/A
Turnout		3,966		
Conservative hold		Swing		

=== Cheetham ===
Cheetham
Party	Candidate	Votes	%	±%
Conservative	H. Boddington*	uncontested		
Conservative hold		Swing		

=== Collegiate Church ===
Collegiate Church
Party	Candidate	Votes	%	±%
Liberal	T. Peel*	uncontested		
Liberal hold		Swing		

=== Exchange ===
Exchange
Party	Candidate	Votes	%	±%
Liberal	J. R. Hampson*	uncontested		
Liberal hold		Swing		

=== Medlock Street ===
Medlock Street
Party	Candidate	Votes	%	±%
Liberal	D. Greenwood*	1,208	50.7	N/A
Conservative	W. Deakin	1,175	49.3	N/A
Majority		33	1.4	N/A
Turnout		2,383		
Liberal hold		Swing		

=== New Cross ===
New Cross
Party	Candidate	Votes	%	±%
Liberal	G. Howarth*	uncontested		
Liberal	C. Rowley*	uncontested		
Liberal hold		Swing		
Liberal hold		Swing		

=== Oxford ===
Oxford
Party	Candidate	Votes	%	±%
Liberal	J. F. Roberts*	uncontested		
Liberal hold		Swing		

=== St. Ann's ===
St. Ann's
Party	Candidate	Votes	%	±%
Conservative	T. Rose*	uncontested		
Conservative hold		Swing		

=== St. Clement's ===
St. Clement's
Party	Candidate	Votes	%	±%
Liberal	E. Asquith*	772	50.9	N/A
Conservative	B. Gibbons	746	49.1	N/A
Majority		26	1.8	N/A
Turnout		1,518		
Liberal hold		Swing		

=== St. George's ===
St. George's
Party	Candidate	Votes	%	±%
Liberal	T. Schofield*	uncontested		
Liberal hold		Swing		

=== St. James' ===
St. James'
Party	Candidate	Votes	%	±%
Conservative	W. T. Windsor*	uncontested		
Conservative hold		Swing		

=== St. John's ===
St. John's
Party	Candidate	Votes	%	±%
Conservative	W. Livesley*	uncontested		
Conservative hold		Swing		

=== St. Luke's ===
St. Luke's
Party	Candidate	Votes	%	±%
Conservative	C. W. May*	uncontested		
Conservative hold		Swing		

=== St. Michael's ===
St. Michael's
Party	Candidate	Votes	%	±%
Conservative	J. Faulkner	2,372	51.0	N/A
Liberal	B. Brierley*	2,275	49.0	N/A
Majority		97	2.0	N/A
Turnout		4,647		
Conservative gain from Liberal		Swing		
