= 1875 Manchester City Council election =

Local election in Manchester

- 1 November 1875

16 of 64 seats to Manchester City Council 33 seats needed for a majority
	First party	Second party
Party	Liberal	Conservative
Last election	8 seats, 51.5%	8 seats, 48.5%
Seats before	36	28
Seats won	11	5
Seats after	41	23
Seat change	▲5	▼5
Popular vote	14,899	14,446
Percentage	50.8%	49.2%
Swing	▼0.7%	▲0.7%
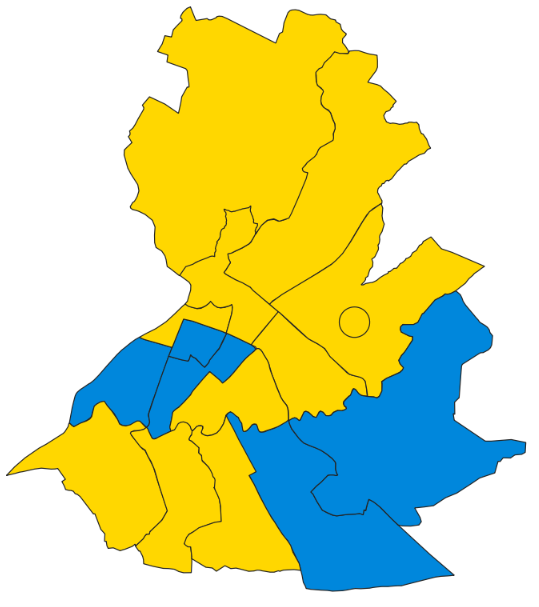
- Map of results of 1875 election
Leader of the Council before election
Liberal
Leader of the Council after election
Liberal

Elections to Manchester City Council were held on Monday, 1 November 1875. One third of the councillors seats were up for election, with each successful candidate to serve a three-year term of office. The Liberal Party retained overall control of the council.

== Election result ==
Party	Votes		Seats			Full Council	
Liberal Party	14,899 (50.8%)	▼0.7	11 (68.8%)	11 / 16	▲5	41 (64.1%)	41 / 64
Conservative Party	14,446 (49.2%)	▲0.7	5 (31.2%)	5 / 16	▼5	23 (35.9%)	23 / 64

=== Full council ===
↓
41	23

=== Aldermen ===
↓
11	5

=== Councillors ===
↓
30	18

== Ward results ==
=== All Saints' ===
All Saints'
Party	Candidate	Votes	%	±%
Liberal	J. Duncan	1,008	52.6	−9.7
Conservative	T. Potts*	909	47.4	+9.7
Majority		99	5.2	−19.4
Turnout		1,917		
Liberal gain from Conservative		Swing		

=== Ardwick ===
Ardwick
Party	Candidate	Votes	%	±%
Conservative	G. H. Midwood	uncontested		
Conservative hold		Swing		

=== Cheetham ===
Cheetham
Party	Candidate	Votes	%	±%
Liberal	J. J. Harwood*	uncontested		
Liberal hold		Swing		

=== Collegiate Church ===
Collegiate Church
Party	Candidate	Votes	%	±%
Liberal	T. Peel	860	50.9	+8.2
Conservative	R. Simister*	829	49.1	−8.2
Majority		31	1.8	
Turnout		1,689		
Liberal gain from Conservative		Swing		

=== Exchange ===
Exchange
Party	Candidate	Votes	%	±%
Liberal	T. Warburton*	401	51.2	−13.3
Conservative	E. H. Downs	382	48.8	+13.3
Majority		19	2.4	−26.6
Turnout		783		
Liberal hold		Swing		

=== Medlock Street ===
Medlock Street
Party	Candidate	Votes	%	±%
Liberal	D. Greenwood	1,619	55.2	N/A
Conservative	E. K. Norris	1,316	44.8	N/A
Majority		303	10.4	N/A
Turnout		2,935		
Liberal hold		Swing		

=== New Cross ===
New Cross
Party	Candidate	Votes	%	±%
Liberal	C. Rowley	2,906	52.1	N/A
Liberal	G. Howarth	2,805	50.3	N/A
Conservative	W. G. Bennett*	2,725	48.9	N/A
Conservative	W. H. Hughes	2,715	48.7	N/A
Majority		80	1.4	N/A
Turnout		5,575		
Liberal gain from Conservative		Swing		
Liberal gain from Conservative		Swing		

=== Oxford ===
Oxford
Party	Candidate	Votes	%	±%
Liberal	J. F. Roberts*	uncontested		
Liberal hold		Swing		

=== St. Ann's ===
St. Ann's
Party	Candidate	Votes	%	±%
Conservative	T. Rose*	uncontested		
Conservative hold		Swing		

=== St. Clement's ===
St. Clement's
Party	Candidate	Votes	%	±%
Liberal	E. Asquith	1,003	53.8	+4.3
Conservative	G. Anderton*	860	46.2	−4.3
Majority		143	7.6	
Turnout		1,863		
Liberal gain from Conservative		Swing		

=== St. George's ===
St. George's
Party	Candidate	Votes	%	±%
Liberal	T. Schofield*	uncontested		
Liberal hold		Swing		

=== St. James' ===
St. James'
Party	Candidate	Votes	%	±%
Conservative	J. Waterhouse*	uncontested		
Conservative hold		Swing		

=== St. John's ===
St. John's
Party	Candidate	Votes	%	±%
Conservative	W. Livesley	776	60.5	−8.9
Liberal	J. Beahan	506	39.5	+8.9
Majority		270	21.0	−17.8
Turnout		1,282		
Conservative gain from Liberal		Swing		

=== St. Luke's ===
St. Luke's
Party	Candidate	Votes	%	±%
Conservative	C. W. May	1,306	57.3	+26.1
Liberal	C. Whiteley	974	42.7	−26.1
Majority		332	14.6	
Turnout		2,280		
Conservative hold		Swing		

=== St. Michael's ===
St. Michael's
Party	Candidate	Votes	%	±%
Liberal	B. Brierley	2,817	51.7	+3.0
Conservative	R. T. Walker*	2,628	48.3	−3.0
Majority		189	3.4	
Turnout		5,445		
Liberal gain from Conservative		Swing		
