= 1884 Manchester City Council election =

Local election in Manchester

- 1 November 1884

16 of 64 seats to Manchester City Council 33 seats needed for a majority
	First party	Second party
Party	Liberal	Conservative
Last election	7 seats, 46.6%	9 seats, 53.4%
Seats before	39	25
Seats won	8	8
Seats after	39	25
Seat change	Steady	Steady
Popular vote	14,816	16,845
Percentage	44.9%	51.1%
Swing	▼1.7%	▼2.3%
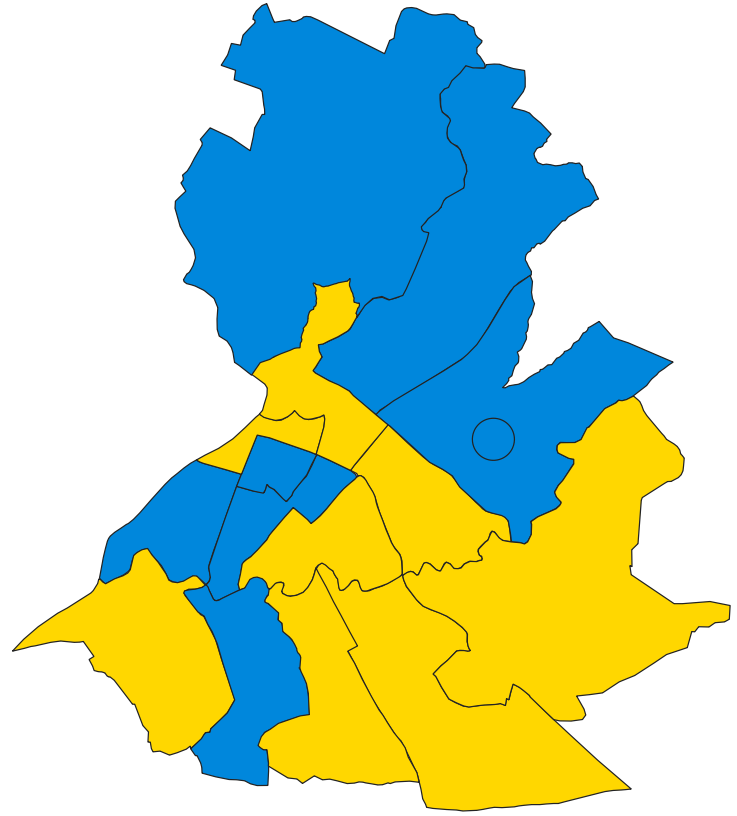
- Map of results of 1884 election
Leader of the Council before election
Liberal
Leader of the Council after election
Liberal

Elections to Manchester City Council took place on Saturday, 1 November 1884. One third of the councillors seats were up for election, with each successful candidate to serve a three-year term of office. The Liberal Party retained overall control of the council.

== Election result ==
Party	Votes		Seats			Full Council	
Liberal Party	14,816 (44.9%)	▼1.7	8 (50.0%)	8 / 16	Steady	39 (60.9%)	39 / 64
Conservative Party	16,845 (51.1%)	▼2.3	8 (50.0%)	8 / 16	Steady	25 (39.1%)	25 / 64
Ind. Nationalist	1,305 (4.0%)	Steady	0 (0.0%)	0 / 16	Steady	0 (0.0%)	0 / 64

=== Full council ===
↓
39	25

=== Aldermen ===
↓
13	3

=== Councillors ===
↓
26	22

== Ward results ==
=== All Saints' ===
All Saints'
Party	Candidate	Votes	%	±%
Liberal	A. McDougall	1,101	53.0	+10.5
Conservative	T. Potts*	975	47.0	−10.5
Majority		126	6.0	
Turnout		2,076		
Liberal gain from Conservative		Swing		

=== Ardwick ===
Ardwick
Party	Candidate	Votes	%	±%
Liberal	J. H. Crosfield	2,030	50.8	N/A
Conservative	S. P. Bidder	1,966	49.2	N/A
Majority		64	1.6	N/A
Turnout		3,996		
Liberal gain from Conservative		Swing		

=== Cheetham ===
Cheetham
Party	Candidate	Votes	%	±%
Conservative	H. Boddington*	1,531	69.8	N/A
Liberal	G. T. Stanley	663	30.2	N/A
Majority		868	39.6	N/A
Turnout		2,194		
Conservative hold		Swing		

=== Collegiate Church ===
Collegiate Church
Party	Candidate	Votes	%	±%
Liberal	W. A. Nicholls*	uncontested		
Liberal hold		Swing		

=== Exchange ===
Exchange
Party	Candidate	Votes	%	±%
Liberal	J. R. Hampson*	uncontested		
Liberal hold		Swing		

=== Medlock Street ===
Medlock Street
Party	Candidate	Votes	%	±%
Conservative	W. Deakin	1,636	58.9	N/A
Liberal	D. Greenwood*	1,141	41.1	N/A
Majority		495	17.8	N/A
Turnout		2,777		
Conservative gain from Liberal		Swing		

=== New Cross ===
New Cross
Party	Candidate	Votes	%	±%
Conservative	J. Woodhouse	2,326	59.8	N/A
Conservative	J. Swindells	2,253	57.9	N/A
Liberal	W. Birkbeck	1,611	41.4	N/A
Liberal	H. C. Pingstone	1,594	41.0	N/A
Majority		642	16.5	N/A
Turnout		3,892		
Conservative gain from Liberal		Swing		
Conservative gain from Liberal		Swing		

=== Oxford ===
Oxford
Party	Candidate	Votes	%	±%
Liberal	J. F. Roberts*	uncontested		
Liberal hold		Swing		

=== St. Ann's ===
St. Ann's
Party	Candidate	Votes	%	±%
Conservative	T. Rose*	uncontested		
Conservative hold		Swing		

=== St. Clement's ===
St. Clement's
Party	Candidate	Votes	%	±%
Liberal	E. Asquith*	774	51.2	+2.7
Conservative	B. Gibbons	737	48.8	−2.7
Majority		37	2.4	
Turnout		1,511		
Liberal hold		Swing		

=== St. George's ===
St. George's
Party	Candidate	Votes	%	±%
Liberal	R. Gibson*	1,786	58.4	N/A
Conservative	P. Gregory	1,272	41.6	N/A
Majority		514	16.8	N/A
Turnout		3,058		
Liberal hold		Swing		

=== St. James' ===
St. James'
Party	Candidate	Votes	%	±%
Conservative	W. T. Windsor*	uncontested		
Conservative hold		Swing		

=== St. John's ===
St. John's
Party	Candidate	Votes	%	±%
Conservative	W. Livesley*	575	69.9	N/A
Liberal	H. G. Nicholson	248	30.1	N/A
Majority		327	39.8	N/A
Turnout		823		
Conservative hold		Swing		

=== St. Luke's ===
St. Luke's
Party	Candidate	Votes	%	±%
Liberal	J. W. Southern	1,883	61.1	N/A
Conservative	J. Towers	1,201	38.9	N/A
Majority		682	22.2	N/A
Turnout		3,084		
Liberal gain from Conservative		Swing		

=== St. Michael's ===
St. Michael's
Party	Candidate	Votes	%	±%
Conservative	J. Faulkner*	2,373	41.9	−10.8
Liberal	W. Sherratt	1,985	35.1	−12.2
Ind. Nationalist	M. Hasney	1,305	23.0	N/A
Majority		388	6.8	+1.4
Turnout		5,663		
Conservative hold		Swing		
