= 1892 Manchester City Council election =

Local election in Manchester

- 1 November 1892

26 of 104 seats to Manchester City Council 53 seats needed for a majority
	First party	Second party	Third party
Party	Conservative	Liberal	Liberal Unionist
Last election	15 seats, 51.8%	7 seats, 43.7%	4 seats, 2.4%
Seats before	46	48	10
Seats won	10	14	1
Seats after	48	46	9
Seat change	▲2	▼2	▼1
Popular vote	7,491	10,615	0
Percentage	32.9%	46.7%	0.0%
Swing	▼18.9%	▲3.0%	▼2.4%
	Fourth party
Party	Independent
Last election	0 seats, 2.1%
Seats before	0
Seats won	1
Seats after	1
Seat change	▲1
Popular vote	1,025
Percentage	4.5%
Swing	▲2.4%
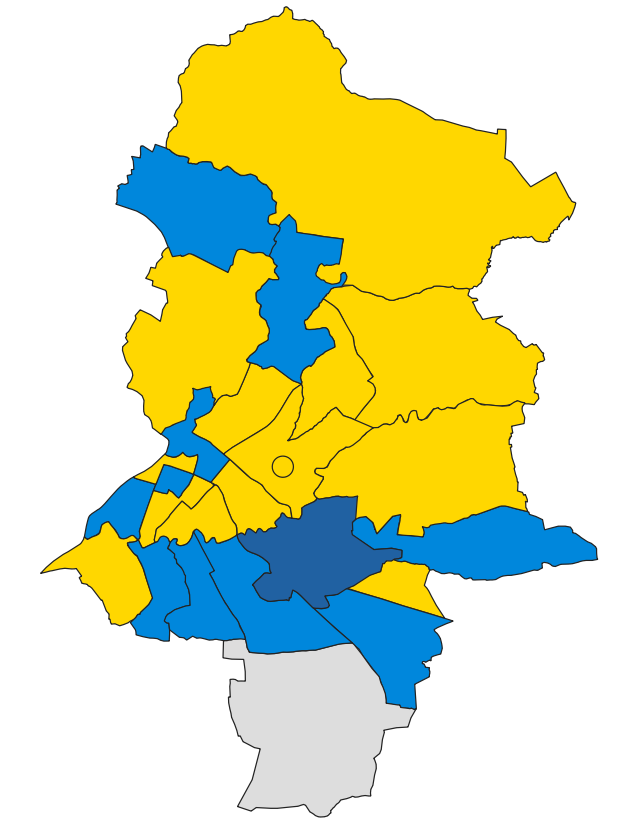
- Map of results of 1892 election
Leader of the Council before election
No overall control
Leader of the Council after election
No overall control

Elections to Manchester City Council were held on Tuesday, 1 November 1892. One third of the councillors seats were up for election, with each successful candidate to serve a three-year term of office. The council remained under no overall control.

== Election result ==
Party	Votes		Seats			Full Council	
Conservative Party	7,491 (32.9%)	▼18.9	10 (38.5%)	10 / 26	▲2	48 (46.2%)	48 / 104
Liberal Party	10,615 (46.7%)	▲3.0	14 (53.8%)	14 / 26	▼2	46 (44.2%)	46 / 104
Liberal Unionist	0 (0.0%)	▼2.4	1 (3.8%)	1 / 26	▼1	9 (8.7%)	9 / 104
Independent	1,025 (4.5%)	▲2.4	1 (3.8%)	1 / 26	▲1	1 (1.0%)	1 / 104
Ind. Labour Party	2,235 (9.8%)	N/A	0 (0.0%)	0 / 26	N/A	0 (0.0%)	0 / 104
Palace of Varieties	1,174 (5.2%)	N/A	0 (0.0%)	0 / 26	N/A	0 (0.0%)	0 / 104
Independent Labour	200 (0.9%)	N/A	0 (0.0%)	0 / 26	N/A	0 (0.0%)	0 / 104

=== Full council ===
↓
46	1	9	48

=== Aldermen ===
↓
14	3	9

=== Councillors ===
↓
32	1	6	39

== Ward results ==
=== All Saints' ===
All Saints'
Party	Candidate	Votes	%	±%
Conservative	S. Ashcroft*	uncontested		
Conservative hold		Swing		

=== Ardwick ===
Ardwick
Party	Candidate	Votes	%	±%
Liberal Unionist	R. C. Smith*	uncontested		
Liberal Unionist hold		Swing		

=== Blackley and Moston ===
Blackley and Moston
Party	Candidate	Votes	%	±%
Liberal	J. Ward*	uncontested		
Liberal hold		Swing		

=== Bradford ===
Bradford
Party	Candidate	Votes	%	±%
Liberal	J. Hutt*	uncontested		
Liberal hold		Swing		

=== Cheetham ===
Cheetham
Party	Candidate	Votes	%	±%
Liberal	J. Rushworth*	uncontested		
Liberal hold		Swing		

=== Collegiate Church ===
Collegiate Church
Party	Candidate	Votes	%	±%
Conservative	J. Bradshaw*	uncontested		
Conservative hold		Swing		

=== Crumpsall ===
Crumpsall
Party	Candidate	Votes	%	±%
Conservative	F. Heywood	548	59.2	N/A
Liberal	G. Rhodes*	378	40.8	N/A
Majority		170	18.4	N/A
Turnout		926		
Conservative gain from Liberal		Swing		

=== Exchange ===
Exchange
Party	Candidate	Votes	%	±%
Liberal	J. G. Batty*	411	56.5	N/A
Independent	D. P. Schloss	317	43.5	N/A
Majority		94	13.0	N/A
Turnout		728		
Liberal hold		Swing		

=== Harpurhey ===
Harpurhey
Party	Candidate	Votes	%	±%
Conservative	J. Richards*	2,163	65.1	N/A
Ind. Labour Party	A. Settle	1,162	34.9	N/A
Majority		1,001	30.2	N/A
Turnout		3,325		
Conservative hold		Swing		

=== Longsight ===
Longsight
Party	Candidate	Votes	%	±%
Conservative	J. R. Wilson*	uncontested		
Conservative hold		Swing		

=== Medlock Street ===
Medlock Street
Party	Candidate	Votes	%	±%
Conservative	H. H. Mainwaring*	1,824	70.8	N/A
Palace of Varieties	E. Jones	753	29.2	N/A
Majority		1,071	41.6	N/A
Turnout		2,577		
Conservative hold		Swing		

=== Miles Platting ===
Miles Platting
Party	Candidate	Votes	%	±%
Liberal	J. Bowes*	uncontested		
Liberal hold		Swing		

=== New Cross ===
New Cross
Party	Candidate	Votes	%	±%
Liberal	W. Birkbeck*	2,000	66.6	N/A
Liberal	R. Lloyd*	1,860	61.9	N/A
Ind. Labour Party	J. Ritson	1,073	35.7	N/A
Majority		787	26.2	N/A
Turnout		3,003		
Liberal hold		Swing		
Liberal hold		Swing		

=== Newton Heath ===
Newton Heath
Party	Candidate	Votes	%	±%
Liberal	W. Trevor*	uncontested		
Liberal hold		Swing		

=== Openshaw ===
Openshaw
Party	Candidate	Votes	%	±%
Conservative	D. Taylor*	uncontested		
Conservative hold		Swing		

=== Oxford ===
Oxford
Party	Candidate	Votes	%	±%
Liberal	J. H. Greenhow*	uncontested		
Liberal hold		Swing		

=== Rusholme ===
Rusholme
Party	Candidate	Votes	%	±%
Independent	H. Plummer	708	59.7	N/A
Conservative	S. Royle*	478	40.3	N/A
Majority		230	19.4	N/A
Turnout		1,186		
Independent gain from Conservative		Swing		

=== St. Ann's ===
St. Ann's
Party	Candidate	Votes	%	±%
Conservative	J. Fildes	695	67.9	+13.9
Liberal	J. H. Boydell	328	32.1	−13.8
Majority		367	35.8	+27.6
Turnout		1,023		
Conservative gain from Liberal Unionist		Swing		

=== St. Clement's ===
St. Clement's
Party	Candidate	Votes	%	±%
Liberal	G. D. Kelley*	716	53.7	+8.5
Conservative	R. Smith	618	46.3	−8.5
Majority		98	7.4	
Turnout		1,334		
Liberal hold		Swing		

=== St. George's ===
St. George's
Party	Candidate	Votes	%	±%
Liberal	R. Carhart*	1,859	81.5	N/A
Palace of Varieties	J. Waddington	421	18.5	N/A
Majority		1,438	63.0	N/A
Turnout		2,280		
Liberal hold		Swing		

=== St. James' ===
St. James'
Party	Candidate	Votes	%	±%
Liberal	H. J. Goldschmidt*	uncontested		
Liberal hold		Swing		

=== St. John's ===
St. John's
Party	Candidate	Votes	%	±%
Conservative	H. Shuttleworth	499	58.8	+2.9
Liberal	F. Smallman*	349	41.2	N/A
Majority		150	17.6	+5.8
Turnout		848		
Conservative gain from Liberal		Swing		

=== St. Luke's ===
St. Luke's
Party	Candidate	Votes	%	±%
Conservative	A. Marshall*	uncontested		
Conservative hold		Swing		

=== St. Mark's ===
St. Mark's
Party	Candidate	Votes	%	±%
Liberal	S. H. Brooks*	870	50.1	−2.1
Conservative	J. Phythian	666	38.4	−9.4
Independent Labour	E. S. Jones	200	11.5	N/A
Majority		204	11.7	+7.3
Turnout		1,736		
Liberal hold		Swing		

=== St. Michael's ===
St. Michael's
Party	Candidate	Votes	%	±%
Liberal	D. McCabe*	1,664	90.2	+37.4
Liberal	H. Lightholder	180	9.8	N/A
Majority		1,484	80.4	+74.8
Turnout		1,844		
Liberal hold		Swing		

== Aldermanic elections ==
=== Aldermanic elections, 9 November 1892 ===
At the meeting of the council on 9 November 1892, the terms of office of thirteen aldermen expired.

The following thirteen were elected as aldermen by the council on 9 November 1892 for a term of six years.

Party	Alderman	Ward	Term expires
Liberal	J. H. Crosfield*	Openshaw	1898
Liberal	Alfred Evans*		1898
Conservative	William Griffin*	Harpurhey	1898
Liberal	Sir John James Harwood*		1898
Liberal	Lloyd Higginbottom*	St. Mark's	1898
Conservative	John Hinchliffe*		1898
Conservative	William Livesley*		1898
Liberal	A. E. Lloyd*		1898
Conservative	Anthony Marshall		1898
Liberal	John Milling*		1898
Liberal	John Foulkes Roberts*		1898
Liberal	James Rushworth		1898
Liberal	Walton Smith*		1898

=== Aldermanic election, 4 January 1893 ===
Caused by the death on 15 December 1892 of Alderman William Livesley (Conservative, elected as an alderman by the council on 24 June 1887).

In his place, Councillor John Roberts (Conservative, All Saints', elected 1 November 1882) was elected as an alderman by the council on 4 January 1893.

Party	Alderman	Ward	Term expires
Conservative	John Roberts		1898

=== Aldermanic election, 15 February 1893 ===
Caused by the resignation on 1 February 1893 of Alderman William Henry Holland M.P. (Liberal, elected as an alderman by the council on 10 November 1890).

In his place, Councillor George Clay (Liberal Unionist, Oxford, elected 1 November 1882) was elected as an alderman by the council on 15 February 1893.

Party	Alderman	Ward	Term expires
Liberal Unionist	George Clay		1895

=== Aldermanic election, 21 June 1893 ===
Caused by the death on 28 May 1893 of Alderman John Hinchliffe (Conservative, elected as an alderman by the council on 8 April 1891).

In his place, Councillor James Hoy (Liberal, St. Luke's, elected 1 November 1882) was elected as an alderman by the council on 21 June 1893.

Party	Alderman	Ward	Term expires
Liberal	James Hoy		1898

=== Aldermanic election, 6 September 1893 ===
Caused by the death on 19 August 1893 of Alderman Abel Heywood (Liberal, elected as an alderman by the council on 9 November 1853).

In his place, Councillor Robert Gibson (Liberal, St. George's, elected 11 December 1882) was elected as an alderman by the council on 6 September 1893.

Party	Alderman	Ward	Term expires
Liberal	Robert Gibson		1895

== By-elections between 1892 and 1893 ==
=== By-elections, 23 November 1892 ===
Two by-elections were held on 23 November 1892 to fill vacancies that were created by the appointment of aldermen on 9 November 1892.

==== Cheetham ====
Caused by the election as an alderman of Councillor James Rushworth (Liberal, Cheetham, elected 13 November 1880) on 9 November 1892 following the defeat on 9 November 1892 of Alderman George Evans (Liberal, elected as an alderman by the council on 10 November 1890).

Cheetham
Party	Candidate	Votes	%	±%
Liberal	J. E. Phythian	1,235	53.1	N/A
Conservative	W. E. Husband	1,092	46.9	N/A
Majority		143	6.2	N/A
Turnout		2,327		
Liberal hold		Swing		

==== St. Luke's ====
Caused by the election as an alderman of Councillor Anthony Marshall (Conservative, St. Luke's, elected 22 September 1882) on 9 November 1892 following the defeat on 9 November 1892 of Alderman Dr. George Hanna Russell (Liberal, elected as an alderman by the council on 10 November 1890).

St. Luke's
Party	Candidate	Votes	%	±%
Liberal	T. Eggington	1,781	51.7	N/A
Conservative	G. McWilliams	1,666	48.3	N/A
Majority		115	3.4	N/A
Turnout		3,447		
Liberal gain from Conservative		Swing		

=== All Saints', 17 January 1893 ===
Caused by the election as an alderman of Councillor John Roberts (Conservative, All Saints', elected 1 November 1882) on 4 January 1893 following the death on 15 December 1892 of Alderman William Livesley (Conservative, elected as an alderman by the council on 24 June 1887).

All Saints'
Party	Candidate	Votes	%	±%
Conservative	S. Locke	1,200	54.1	N/A
Liberal	J. Nasmith	1,017	45.9	N/A
Majority		183	8.2	N/A
Turnout		2,217		
Conservative hold		Swing		

=== Oxford, 28 February 1893 ===
Caused by the election as an alderman of Councillor George Clay (Liberal Unionist, Oxford, elected 1 November 1882) on 15 February 1893 following the resignation on 1 February 1893 of Alderman William Henry Holland M.P. (Liberal, elected as an alderman by the council on 10 November 1890).

Oxford
Party	Candidate	Votes	%	±%
Liberal	W. Simpson	423	54.7	N/A
Conservative	J. J. Lambert	350	45.3	N/A
Majority		73	9.4	N/A
Turnout		773		
Liberal gain from Liberal Unionist		Swing		

=== St. Luke's, 5 July 1893 ===
Caused by the election as an alderman of Councillor James Hoy (Liberal, St. Luke's, elected 1 November 1882) on 21 June 1893 following the death on 28 May 1893 of Alderman John Hinchliffe (Conservative, elected as an alderman by the council on 8 April 1891).

St. Luke's
Party	Candidate	Votes	%	±%
Liberal Unionist	W. J. Sinclair	1,776	53.2	N/A
Liberal	W. Champness	1,564	46.8	N/A
Majority		212	6.4	N/A
Turnout		3,340		
Liberal Unionist gain from Liberal		Swing		

=== St. George's, 5 July 1893 ===
Caused by the election as an alderman of Councillor Robert Gibson (Liberal, St. George's, elected 11 December 1882) on 6 September 1893 following the death on 19 August 1893 of Alderman Abel Heywood (Liberal, elected as an alderman by the council on 9 November 1853).

St. George's
Party	Candidate	Votes	%	±%
Conservative	R. A. S. Daly	1,528	47.3	N/A
Liberal	F. Smallman	959	29.7	−51.8
Ind. Labour Party	R. Anderson	745	23.0	N/A
Majority		569	17.6	
Turnout		3,232		
Conservative gain from Liberal		Swing		
