= 1902 Manchester City Council election =

Local election in Manchester

- 1 November 1902

26 of 104 seats to Manchester City Council 53 seats needed for a majority
	First party	Second party	Third party
Party	Conservative	Liberal	Labour
Last election	11 seats, 53.2%	14 seats, 18.4%	0 seats, 16.4%
Seats before	51	46	3
Seats won	16	9	1
Seats after	50	46	4
Seat change	▼1	Steady	▲1
Popular vote	20,248	14,486	5,751
Percentage	46.7%	33.4%	13.3%
Swing	▼6.5%	▲15.0%	▼3.1%
	Fourth party	Fifth party
Party	Independent	Liberal Unionist
Last election	1 seats, 12.0%	0 seats, 0.0%
Seats before	2	2
Seats won	0	0
Seats after	2	2
Seat change	Steady	Steady
Popular vote	2,883	0
Percentage	6.6%	0.0%
Swing	▼5.4%	Steady
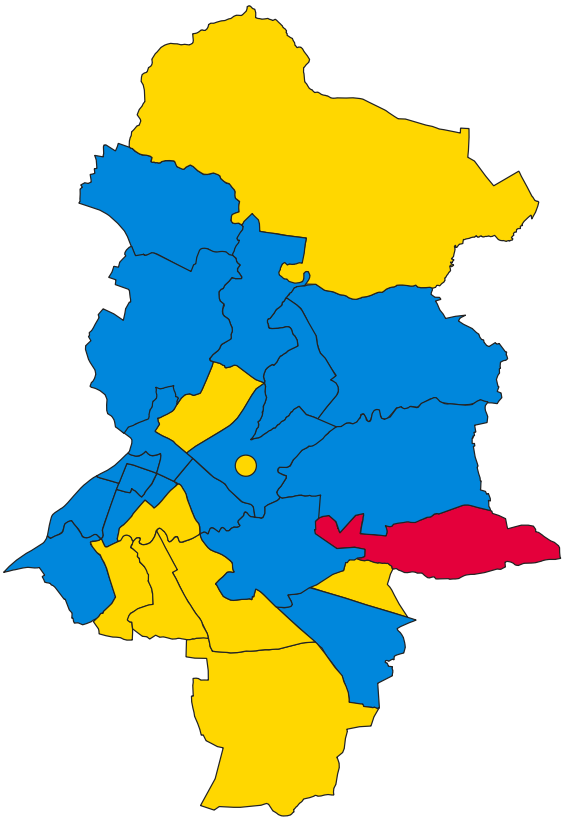
- Map of results of 1902 election
Leader of the Council before election
No overall control
Leader of the Council after election
No overall control

Elections to Manchester City Council were held on Saturday, 1 November 1902. One third of the councillors seats were up for election, with each successful candidate to serve a three-year term of office. The council remained under no overall control.

== Election result ==
Party	Votes		Seats			Full Council	
Conservative Party	20,248 (46.7%)	▼6.5	16 (61.5%)	16 / 26	▼1	50 (48.1%)	50 / 104
Liberal Party	14,486 (33.4%)	▲15.0	9 (34.6%)	9 / 26	Steady	46 (44.2%)	46 / 104
Labour Party	5,751 (13.3%)	▼3.1	1 (3.8%)	1 / 26	▲1	4 (3.8%)	4 / 104
Independent	2,883 (6.6%)	▼5.4	0 (0.0%)	0 / 26	Steady	2 (1.9%)	2 / 104
Liberal Unionist	0 (0.0%)	Steady	0 (0.0%)	0 / 26	Steady	2 (1.9%)	2 / 104

=== Full council ===
↓
4	46	2	2	50

=== Aldermen ===
↓
16	2	8

=== Councillors ===
↓
4	30	2	42

== Ward results ==
=== All Saints' ===
All Saints'
Party	Candidate	Votes	%	±%
Liberal	W. B. Pritchard*	879	50.1	N/A
Independent	H. M. Ross Clyne	877	49.9	N/A
Majority		2	0.2	N/A
Turnout		1,756		
Liberal hold		Swing		

=== Ardwick ===
Ardwick
Party	Candidate	Votes	%	±%
Conservative	J. Stewart*	1,516	50.1	−19.1
Independent	R. Hughes	1,511	49.9	+19.1
Majority		5	0.2	−38.2
Turnout		3,027		
Conservative hold		Swing		

=== Blackley and Moston ===
Blackley and Moston
Party	Candidate	Votes	%	±%
Liberal	G. Bennett	1,426	53.6	N/A
Conservative	W. Prescott	1,233	46.4	N/A
Majority		193	7.2	N/A
Turnout		2,659		
Liberal gain from Conservative		Swing		

=== Bradford ===
Bradford
Party	Candidate	Votes	%	±%
Conservative	C. Dreyfus*	2,466	53.9	N/A
Labour	T. Fox	2,110	46.1	N/A
Majority		356	7.8	N/A
Turnout		4,576		
Conservative hold		Swing		

=== Cheetham ===
Cheetham
Party	Candidate	Votes	%	±%
Conservative	R. Oliver*	uncontested		
Conservative hold		Swing		

=== Collegiate Church ===
Collegiate Church
Party	Candidate	Votes	%	±%
Conservative	J. Lowry*	uncontested		
Conservative hold		Swing		

=== Crumpsall ===
Crumpsall
Party	Candidate	Votes	%	±%
Conservative	H. H. Humphreys	720	55.4	N/A
Liberal	J. J. Kendall	502	38.6	N/A
Labour	A. Ogden	78	6.0	N/A
Majority		218	16.8	N/A
Turnout		1,300		
Conservative gain from Liberal		Swing		

=== Exchange ===
Exchange
Party	Candidate	Votes	%	±%
Conservative	T. Smethurst*	uncontested		
Conservative hold		Swing		

=== Harpurhey ===
Harpurhey
Party	Candidate	Votes	%	±%
Conservative	W. Holden	2,783	58.7	N/A
Labour	T. Cook	1,956	41.3	N/A
Majority		827	17.4	N/A
Turnout		4,739		
Conservative hold		Swing		

=== Longsight ===
Longsight
Party	Candidate	Votes	%	±%
Conservative	C. Jennison*	uncontested		
Conservative hold		Swing		

=== Medlock Street ===
Medlock Street
Party	Candidate	Votes	%	±%
Liberal	J. D. Pennington*	1,558	51.2	N/A
Conservative	W. B. Broadhead	1,483	48.8	N/A
Majority		75	2.4	N/A
Turnout		3,041		
Liberal hold		Swing		

=== Miles Platting ===
Miles Platting
Party	Candidate	Votes	%	±%
Conservative	H. Heenan*	uncontested		
Conservative hold		Swing		

=== New Cross ===
New Cross
Party	Candidate	Votes	%	±%
Conservative	N. Meadowcroft	2,602	53.3	N/A
Liberal	R. Bishop*	2,368	48.5	N/A
Liberal	M. Grimshaw*	2,183	44.8	N/A
Majority		185	3.8	N/A
Turnout		4,878		
Conservative gain from Liberal		Swing		
Liberal hold		Swing		

=== Newton Heath ===
Newton Heath
Party	Candidate	Votes	%	±%
Conservative	W. T. Rothwell*	uncontested		
Conservative hold		Swing		

=== Openshaw ===
Openshaw
Party	Candidate	Votes	%	±%
Labour	E. J. Hart	1,607	52.7	N/A
Conservative	J. Johnson*	1,443	47.3	N/A
Majority		164	5.4	N/A
Turnout		3,050		
Labour gain from Conservative		Swing		

=== Oxford ===
Oxford
Party	Candidate	Votes	%	±%
Liberal	A. Burgon	376	56.6	+8.9
Conservative	W. T. Hill	288	43.4	N/A
Majority		88	13.2	
Turnout		664		
Liberal gain from Conservative		Swing		

=== Rusholme ===
Rusholme
Party	Candidate	Votes	%	±%
Liberal	E. Holt*	1,706	56.7	N/A
Conservative	W. Hyde	1,305	43.3	N/A
Majority		401	13.4	N/A
Turnout		3,011		
Liberal hold		Swing		

=== St. Ann's ===
St. Ann's
Party	Candidate	Votes	%	±%
Conservative	C. W. Botsford*	uncontested		
Conservative hold		Swing		

=== St. Clement's ===
St. Clement's
Party	Candidate	Votes	%	±%
Conservative	J. B. Langley*	uncontested		
Conservative hold		Swing		

=== St. George's ===
St. George's
Party	Candidate	Votes	%	±%
Conservative	A. Craven	1,925	64.1	+12.9
Liberal	F. H. Worswick	1,076	35.9	N/A
Majority		849	28.2	+25.8
Turnout		3,631		
Conservative hold		Swing		

=== St. James' ===
St. James'
Party	Candidate	Votes	%	±%
Conservative	H. Samson*	uncontested		
Conservative hold		Swing		

=== St. John's ===
St. John's
Party	Candidate	Votes	%	±%
Conservative	T. Watmough*	567	58.2	+9.1
Independent	J. Stevenson	407	41.8	N/A
Majority		160	16.4	
Turnout		974		
Conservative hold		Swing		

=== St. Luke's ===
St. Luke's
Party	Candidate	Votes	%	±%
Liberal	H. Marsden*	uncontested		
Liberal hold		Swing		

=== St. Mark's ===
St. Mark's
Party	Candidate	Votes	%	±%
Liberal	J. Allison*	987	59.5	N/A
Conservative	R. Cadman	673	40.5	N/A
Majority		314	19.0	N/A
Turnout		1,660		
Liberal hold		Swing		

=== St. Michael's ===
St. Michael's
Party	Candidate	Votes	%	±%
Liberal	J. H. Wells*	1,425	51.7	N/A
Conservative	S. Williams	1,244	45.1	N/A
Independent	W. Brown	88	3.2	N/A
Majority		181	6.6	N/A
Turnout		2,757		
Liberal hold		Swing		

== Aldermanic elections ==
=== Aldermanic election, 19 November 1902 ===
Caused by the death on 4 November 1902 of Alderman John Foulkes Roberts (Liberal, elected as an alderman by the council on 11 March 1885).

In his place, Councillor William H. Vaudrey (Conservative, St. Ann's, elected 4 November 1889) was elected as an alderman by the council on 19 November 1902.

Party	Alderman	Ward	Term expires
Conservative	William H. Vaudrey	Exchange	1904

=== Aldermanic election, 28 October 1903 ===
Caused by the resignation on 7 October 1903 of Alderman William Thomas Bax (Liberal, elected as an alderman by the council on 15 February 1899).

In his place, Councillor James Bowes (Liberal, Miles Platting, elected 1 November 1890) was elected as an alderman by the council on 28 October 1903.

Party	Alderman	Ward	Term expires
Liberal	James Bowes		1904

== By-elections between 1902 and 1903 ==
=== By-elections, 1 December 1902 ===
Two by-elections were held on 1 December 1902 to fill vacancies which had arisen in the city council.

==== New Cross ====
Caused by the resignation of Councillor Dr. Robert Bishop (Liberal, New Cross, elected 2 November 1896) on 12 November 1902.

New Cross
Party	Candidate	Votes	%	±%
Conservative	W. B. Broadhead	2,109	50.3	−3.0
Liberal	M. Grimshaw	2,080	49.7	+1.2
Majority		29	0.6	
Turnout		4,189		
Conservative gain from Liberal		Swing		

==== St. Ann's ====
Caused by the election as an alderman of Councillor William H. Vaudrey (Conservative, St. Ann's, elected 4 November 1889) on 19 November 1902 following the death on 4 November 1902 of Alderman John Foulkes Roberts (Liberal, elected as an alderman by the council on 11 March 1885).

St. Ann's
Party	Candidate	Votes	%	±%
Liberal	R. G. Lawson	549	50.9	N/A
Conservative	P. Woodhouse	498	46.2	N/A
Independent	T. Cook	32	2.9	N/A
Majority		51	4.7	N/A
Turnout		1,079		
Liberal gain from Conservative		Swing		

=== St. Luke's, 19 May 1903 ===
Caused by the resignation of Councillor Dr. Cornelius O'Doherty (Liberal, St. Luke's, elected 1 November 1895) on 24 April 1903.

St. Luke's
Party	Candidate	Votes	%	±%
Liberal	J. H. Thewlis	1,355	50.6	N/A
Conservative	J. Johnson	1,321	49.4	N/A
Majority		34	1.2	N/A
Turnout		2,676		
Liberal hold		Swing		

=== Rusholme, 16 June 1903 ===
Caused by the resignation of Councillor Edwyn Holt (Liberal, Rusholme, elected 1 November 1893) on 21 May 1903.

Rusholme
Party	Candidate	Votes	%	±%
Conservative	W. F. Lane-Scott	uncontested		
Conservative gain from Liberal		Swing		
