= 1845 Manchester Borough Council election =

Local election in Manchester

- 1 November 1845

16 of 64 seats to Manchester Borough Council 33 seats needed for a majority
	First party	Second party
Party	Liberal	Conservative
Last election	13 seats, 40.3%	3 seats, 57.4%
Seats before	60	4
Seats won	13	3
Seats after	57	7
Seat change	▼3	▲3
Popular vote	828	627
Percentage	50.1%	37.9%
Swing	▲9.8%	▼14.5%
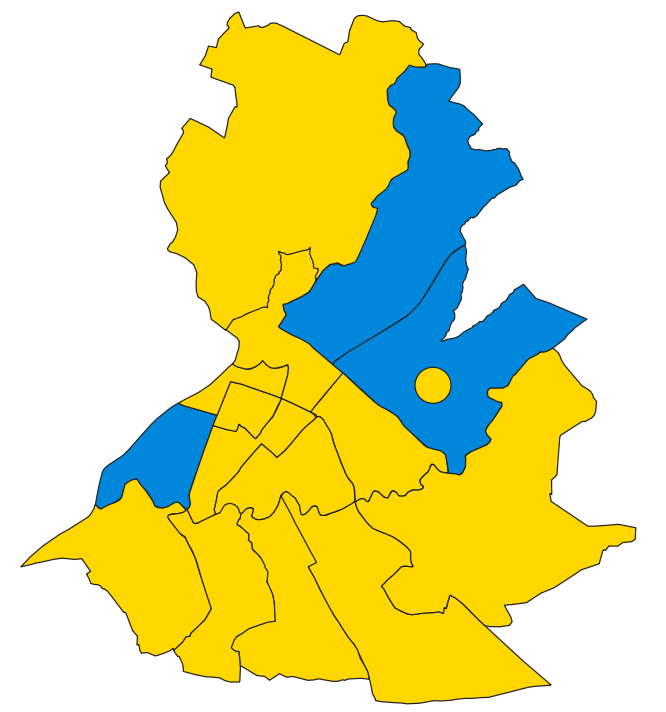
- Map of results of 1845 election
Leader of the Council before election
Liberal
Leader of the Council after election
Liberal

Elections to Manchester Borough Council were held on Saturday, 1 November 1845. One third of the councillors seats were up for election, with each successful candidate to serve a three-year term of office. The Liberal Party retained overall control of the council.

== Election result ==
Party	Votes		Seats			Full Council	
Liberal Party	828 (50.1%)	▲9.8	13 (81.3%)	13 / 16	▼3	57 (89.1%)	57 / 64
Conservative Party	627 (37.9%)	▼19.5	3 (18.7%)	3 / 16	▲3	7 (10.9%)	7 / 64
Residents	198 (12.0%)	N/A	0 (0.0%)	0 / 16	N/A	0 (0.0%)	0 / 64

=== Full council ===
↓
57	7

=== Aldermen ===
↓
16

=== Councillors ===
↓
41	7

== Ward results ==
=== All Saints' ===
All Saints'
Party	Candidate	Votes	%	±%
Liberal	Robert Anlezark Pilling	uncontested		
Liberal hold		Swing		

=== Ardwick ===
Ardwick
Party	Candidate	Votes	%	±%
Liberal	James Thompson*	uncontested		
Liberal hold		Swing		

=== Cheetham ===
Cheetham
Party	Candidate	Votes	%	±%
Liberal	William Shuttleworth*	uncontested		
Liberal hold		Swing		

=== Collegiate Church ===
Collegiate Church
Party	Candidate	Votes	%	±%
Liberal	Thomas Handley*	uncontested		
Liberal hold		Swing		

=== Exchange ===
Exchange
Party	Candidate	Votes	%	±%
Liberal	William Rawson*	uncontested		
Liberal hold		Swing		

=== Medlock Street ===
Medlock Street
Party	Candidate	Votes	%	±%
Liberal	Matthew Tomlinson*	180	52.8	N/A
Residents	Abraham Dearden	161	47.2	N/A
Majority		19	5.6	N/A
Turnout		341		
Liberal hold		Swing		

=== New Cross ===
New Cross
Party	Candidate	Votes	%	±%
Conservative	John Howard	214	51.6	−8.5
Liberal	John Swindells*	213	51.3	+13.1
Conservative	Matthew Kennedy	206	49.6	−10.5
Liberal	George Robertson*	187	45.1	+6.9
Majority		7	1.7	
Turnout		415		
Conservative gain from Liberal		Swing		
Liberal hold		Swing		

=== Oxford ===
Oxford
Party	Candidate	Votes	%	±%
Liberal	John Gyte	uncontested		
Liberal hold		Swing		

=== St. Ann's ===
St. Ann's
Party	Candidate	Votes	%	±%
Liberal	William Henry Wood	uncontested		
Liberal hold		Swing		

=== St. Clement's ===
St. Clement's
Party	Candidate	Votes	%	±%
Liberal	Benjamin Nicholls	uncontested		
Liberal hold		Swing		

=== St. George's ===
St. George's
Party	Candidate	Votes	%	±%
Liberal	John Standring	131	78.0	N/A
Residents	William Cottrell	37	22.0	N/A
Majority		94	56.0	N/A
Turnout		168		
Liberal hold		Swing		

=== St. James' ===
St. James'
Party	Candidate	Votes	%	±%
Liberal	George Nelson*	uncontested		
Liberal hold		Swing		

=== St. John's ===
St. John's
Party	Candidate	Votes	%	±%
Conservative	William Harrison	uncontested		
Conservative gain from Liberal		Swing		

=== St. Luke's ===
St. Luke's
Party	Candidate	Votes	%	±%
Liberal	Walter Clark*	uncontested		
Liberal hold		Swing		

=== St. Michael's ===
St. Michael's
Party	Candidate	Votes	%	±%
Conservative	Thomas Slater	207	63.8	+14.9
Liberal	John Mills	117	36.1	−14.9
Majority		90	27.8	
Turnout		324		
Conservative gain from Liberal		Swing		
