= 1934 Manchester City Council election =

Local election in Manchester

- 1 November 1934

36 of 144 seats on Manchester City Council 73 seats needed for a majority
	First party	Second party	Third party
Party	Conservative	Labour	Liberal
Last election	18 seats, 35.3%	13 seats, 49.7%	4 seats, 11.9%
Seats before	71	38	31
Seats won	14	15	6
Seats after	63	47	30
Seat change	▼8	▲9	▼1
Popular vote	49,919	60,329	12,038
Percentage	38.7%	46.8%	9.3%
Swing	▲3.4%	▼2.9%	▼2.6%
	Fourth party
Party	Independent
Last election	1 seats, 2.5%
Seats before	2
Seats won	0
Seats after	2
Seat change	Steady
Popular vote	2,881
Percentage	2.2%
Swing	▼0.3%
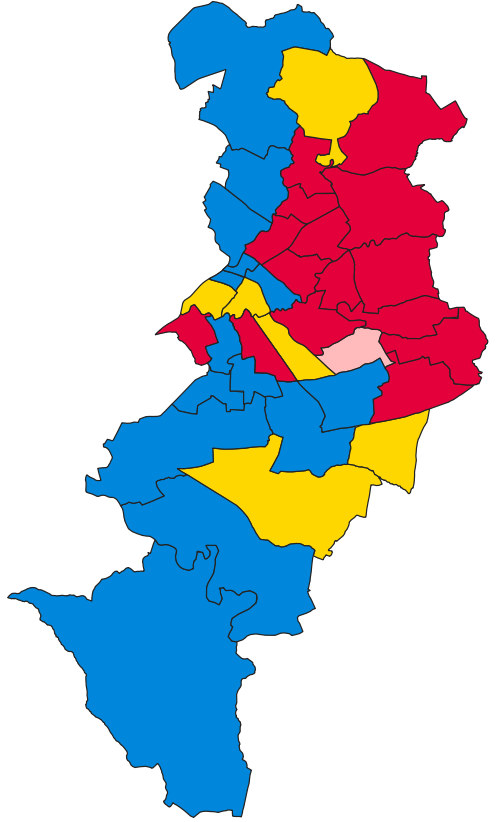
- Map of results of 1934 election
Leader of the Council before election
No overall control
Leader of the Council after election
No overall control

Elections to Manchester City Council were held on Thursday, 1 November 1934. One third of the councillors seats were up for election, with each successful candidate to serve a three-year term of office. The council remained under no overall control.

== Election result ==
Party	Votes		Seats			Full Council	
Conservative Party	49,919 (38.7%)	▲3.4	14 (38.9%)	14 / 36	▼8	63 (43.8%)	63 / 144
Labour Party	60,329 (46.8%)	▼2.9	15 (41.7%)	15 / 36	▲9	47 (32.6%)	47 / 144
Liberal Party	12,038 (9.3%)	▼2.6	6 (16.7%)	6 / 36	▼1	30 (20.8%)	30 / 144
Independent	2,881 (2.2%)	▼0.3	0 (0.0%)	0 / 36	Steady	2 (1.4%)	2 / 144
Independent Labour	3,079 (2.4%)	N/A	1 (2.8%)	1 / 36	Steady	1 (0.7%)	1 / 144
Independent Labour Party	0 (0.0%)	Steady	0 (0.0%)	0 / 36	Steady	1 (0.7%)	1 / 144
Residents	300 (0.2%)	▲0.1	0 (0.0%)	0 / 36	Steady	0 (0.0%)	0 / 144
Communist	289 (0.2%)	▼0.2	0 (0.0%)	0 / 36	Steady	0 (0.0%)	0 / 144

=== Full council ===
↓
1	1	47	30	2	63

=== Aldermen ===
↓
4	11	1	20

=== Councillors ===
↓
1	1	43	19	1	43

== Ward results ==
=== All Saints' ===
All Saints'
Party	Candidate	Votes	%	±%
Labour	H. Fryers	1,300	50.4	+0.8
Conservative	H. Shaw*	1,280	49.6	−0.8
Majority		20	0.8	
Turnout		2,580		
Labour gain from Conservative		Swing		

=== Ardwick ===
Ardwick
Party	Candidate	Votes	%	±%
Labour	J. T. Wolfenden	2,452	54.7	+5.2
Conservative	G. Grocock*	2,028	45.3	−5.2
Majority		424	9.4	
Turnout		4,480		
Labour gain from Conservative		Swing		

=== Beswick ===
Beswick
Party	Candidate	Votes	%	±%
Labour	H. Thorneycroft*	4,033	67.3	N/A
Conservative	K. A. Quas-Cohen	1,963	32.7	N/A
Majority		2,070	34.6	N/A
Turnout		5,996		
Labour hold		Swing		

=== Blackley ===
Blackley
Party	Candidate	Votes	%	±%
Liberal	H. Lee*	2,517	63.8	N/A
Labour	T. Sheard	1,431	36.2	−6.6
Majority		1,086	27.6	
Turnout		3,948		
Liberal hold		Swing		

=== Bradford ===
Bradford
Party	Candidate	Votes	%	±%
Labour	H. Frankland	3,422	64.5	+3.9
Conservative	F. J. Riley*	1,884	35.5	−3.9
Majority		1,538	29.0	−7.8
Turnout		5,306		
Labour gain from Conservative		Swing		

=== Cheetham ===
Cheetham
Party	Candidate	Votes	%	±%
Conservative	J. C. Kidd*	1,349	71.2	N/A
Independent	S. Hall	545	28.8	N/A
Majority		804	42.4	
Turnout		1,894		
Conservative hold		Swing		

=== Chorlton-cum-Hardy ===
Chorlton-cum-Hardy
Party	Candidate	Votes	%	±%
Conservative	W. Somerville*	4,580	73.4	+18.4
Labour	C. Bamber	1,664	26.6	+15.0
Majority		2,916	46.8	+25.2
Turnout		6,244		
Conservative hold		Swing		

=== Collegiate Church ===
Collegiate Church
Party	Candidate	Votes	%	±%
Conservative	S. Holmes	1,011	47.9	N/A
Liberal	P. Smith	917	43.5	N/A
Communist	M. Jenkins	181	8.6	+4.1
Majority		94	4.4	
Turnout		2,109		
Conservative hold		Swing		

=== Collyhurst ===
Collyhurst
Party	Candidate	Votes	%	±%
Labour	W. Collingson	3,059	66.2	+3.8
Conservative	L. E. Wilson*	1,560	33.8	−1.0
Majority		1,499	32.4	+4.8
Turnout		4,619		
Labour gain from Conservative		Swing		

=== Crumpsall ===
Crumpsall
Party	Candidate	Votes	%	±%
Conservative	F. Weaver*	1,789	69.7	+23.6
Labour	C. W. Jones	776	30.3	+11.8
Majority		1,013	39.4	+28.3
Turnout		2,565		
Conservative hold		Swing		

=== Didsbury ===
Didsbury
Party	Candidate	Votes	%	±%
Conservative	S. P. Dawson*	3,027	69.1	N/A
Labour	W. Ingham	1,355	30.9	N/A
Majority		1,672	38.2	N/A
Turnout		4,382		
Conservative hold		Swing		

=== Exchange ===
Exchange
Party	Candidate	Votes	%	±%
Conservative	T. A. Higson*	uncontested		
Conservative hold		Swing		

=== Gorton North ===
Gorton North
Party	Candidate	Votes	%	±%
Labour	T. F. Regan*	3,559	73.2	N/A
Conservative	S. Bloor	1,305	26.8	N/A
Majority		2,254	46.4	N/A
Turnout		4,864		
Labour hold		Swing		

=== Gorton South ===
Gorton South
Party	Candidate	Votes	%	±%
Labour	A. Lee*	4,149	69.0	−8.6
Conservative	E. Shaw	1,862	31.0	N/A
Majority		2,287	38.0	−17.2
Turnout		6,011		
Labour hold		Swing		

=== Harpurhey ===
Harpurhey
Party	Candidate	Votes	%	±%
Labour	E. Barnacott	2,691	50.6	+0.8
Conservative	A. Heald	2,623	49.4	−0.8
Majority		68	1.2	
Turnout		5,314		
Labour gain from Conservative		Swing		

=== Levenshulme ===
Levenshulme
Party	Candidate	Votes	%	±%
Liberal	C. R. de la Wyche*	1,979	62.0	N/A
Labour	G. Darling	1,213	38.0	N/A
Majority		766	24.0	N/A
Turnout		3,192		
Liberal hold		Swing		

=== Longsight ===
Longsight
Party	Candidate	Votes	%	±%
Conservative	W. N. Griffin*	2,350	62.2	N/A
Labour	I. E. Thorley	1,429	37.8	N/A
Majority		921	24.4	N/A
Turnout		3,770		
Conservative hold		Swing		

=== Medlock Street ===
Medlock Street
Party	Candidate	Votes	%	±%
Conservative	P. T. Barnes*	1,623	50.9	+12.8
Labour	R. McKeon	1,565	49.1	−12.8
Majority		58	1.8	
Turnout		3,188		
Conservative hold		Swing		

=== Miles Platting ===
Miles Platting
Party	Candidate	Votes	%	±%
Labour	W. C. Chadwick	3,720	66.8	−0.2
Conservative	J. Vickers*	1,846	33.2	+0.2
Majority		1,874	33.6	−0.4
Turnout		5,566		
Labour gain from Conservative		Swing		

=== Moss Side East ===
Moss Side East
Party	Candidate	Votes	%	±%
Conservative	H. Strange*	1,227	45.6	−4.8
Labour	A. O'Donnell	1,161	43.2	−2.8
Residents	A. R. Edwards	300	11.2	+7.6
Majority		66	2.4	−2.0
Turnout		2,688		
Conservative hold		Swing		

=== Moss Side West ===
Moss Side West
Party	Candidate	Votes	%	±%
Conservative	S. C. Brewster	1,977	65.0	−0.9
Labour	T. Knowles	1,066	35.0	+1.7
Majority		911	30.0	−2.6
Turnout		3,043		
Conservative hold		Swing		

=== Moston ===
Moston
Party	Candidate	Votes	%	±%
Labour	W. Onions*	2,879	54.1	+6.8
Conservative	A. C. Cox	2,439	45.9	−6.8
Majority		440	8.2	
Turnout		5,318		
Labour hold		Swing		

=== New Cross ===
New Cross
Party	Candidate	Votes	%	±%
Labour	E. Griffiths	3,457	64.1	−8.9
Conservative	S. Fitton*	1,936	35.9	+8.9
Majority		1,521	28.2	−17.8
Turnout		5,393		
Labour gain from Conservative		Swing		

=== Newton Heath ===
Newton Heath
Party	Candidate	Votes	%	±%
Labour	C. E. P. Stott	2,632	51.9	−5.3
Conservative	H. F. Robinson*	2,437	48.1	+5.3
Majority		195	3.8	−10.6
Turnout		5,069		
Labour gain from Conservative		Swing		

=== Openshaw ===
Openshaw
Party	Candidate	Votes	%	±%
Labour	J. Toole*	3,428	75.4	−16.0
Conservative	E. M. Buckley	999	22.0	N/A
Communist	G. Brown	108	2.4	−6.2
Independent	T. Kilgariff	12	0.2	N/A
Majority		2,429	64.4	−18.4
Turnout		4,547		
Labour hold		Swing		

=== Oxford ===
Oxford
Party	Candidate	Votes	%	±%
Liberal	J. T. Griffiths	394	55.3	N/A
Independent	A. Ellison	319	44.7	N/A
Majority		75	10.6	N/A
Turnout		713		
Liberal hold		Swing		

=== Rusholme ===
Rusholme
Party	Candidate	Votes	%	±%
Conservative	F. A. Jackson*	2,419	66.6	N/A
Labour	W. J. Sharkey	1,214	33.4	+4.2
Majority		1,205	33.2	
Turnout		3,633		
Conservative hold		Swing		

=== St. Ann's ===
St. Ann's
Party	Candidate	Votes	%	±%
Conservative	E. Green*	uncontested		
Conservative hold		Swing		

=== St. Clement's ===
St. Clement's
Party	Candidate	Votes	%	±%
Conservative	P. C. Parker*	uncontested		
Conservative hold		Swing		

=== St. George's ===
St. George's
Party	Candidate	Votes	%	±%
Labour	A. Horan	1,845	59.8	+2.3
Liberal	A. Todd*	1,239	40.2	N/A
Majority		606	19.6	+2.2
Turnout		3,084		
Labour gain from Liberal		Swing		

=== St. John's ===
St. John's
Party	Candidate	Votes	%	±%
Liberal	F. E. Tylecote*	uncontested		
Liberal hold		Swing		

=== St. Luke's ===
St. Luke's
Party	Candidate	Votes	%	±%
Liberal	T. R. Ackroyd*	1,873	58.3	N/A
Labour	W. Taylor	1,341	41.7	−5.1
Majority		532	16.6	
Turnout		3,214		
Liberal hold		Swing		

=== St. Mark's ===
St. Mark's
Party	Candidate	Votes	%	±%
Independent Labour	G. Hall*	3,079	69.3	N/A
Conservative	G. Moores	1,361	30.7	+1.2
Majority		1,718	38.6	
Turnout		4,440		
Independent Labour hold		Swing		

=== St. Michael's ===
St. Michael's
Party	Candidate	Votes	%	±%
Labour	A. Cathcart*	1,880	68.6	+3.5
Conservative	G. C. Clayton	859	31.4	−3.5
Majority		1,021	37.2	+7.0
Turnout		2,739		
Labour hold		Swing		

=== Withington ===
Withington
Party	Candidate	Votes	%	±%
Liberal	T. H. Davies*	3,119	54.7	−4.4
Labour	F. Edwards	2,584	45.3	+4.4
Majority		535	9.4	−8.8
Turnout		5,703		
Liberal hold		Swing		

=== Wythenshawe ===
Wythenshawe
Party	Candidate	Votes	%	±%
Conservative	C. R. W. Menzies*	2,185	36.1	N/A
Independent	S. D. Simon	2,005	33.1	N/A
Labour	F. Helme	1,868	30.8	N/A
Majority		180	3.0	N/A
Turnout		6,058		
Conservative hold		Swing		

== Aldermanic elections ==
=== Aldermanic election, 6 March 1935 ===
Caused by the death on 20 February 1935 of Alderman Sir William Cundiff (Conservative, elected as an alderman by the council on 9 November 1932).

In his place, Councillor Joseph Toole (Labour, Openshaw, elected 21 January 1919) was elected as an alderman by the council on 6 March 1935.

Party	Alderman	Ward	Term expires
Labour	Joseph Toole	St. Michael's	1940

=== Aldermanic election, 5 June 1935 ===
Caused by the death on 29 April 1935 of Alderman T. R. Hewlett (Conservative, elected as an alderman by the council on 6 May 1931).

In his place, Councillor Alfred James (Labour, Miles Platting, elected 6 May 1919) was elected as an alderman by the council on 5 June 1935.

Party	Alderman	Ward	Term expires
Labour	Alfred James	Wythenshawe	1940

=== Aldermanic election, 30 October 1935 ===
Caused by the death on 22 October 1935 of Alderman John Harrison (Independent, elected as an alderman by the council on 2 May 1928).

In his place, Councillor Elijah John Hart (Labour, Bradford, elected 28 May 1919, previously 1902-08) was elected as an alderman by the council on 30 October 1935.

Party	Alderman	Ward	Term expires
Labour	Elijah John Hart	Crumpsall	1937

== By-elections between 1934 and 1935 ==
=== Openshaw, 26 March 1935 ===
Caused by the election as an alderman of Councillor Joseph Toole (Labour, Openshaw, elected 21 January 1919) on 6 March 1935, following the death on 20 February 1935 of Alderman Sir William Cundiff (Conservative, elected as an alderman by the council on 9 November 1932).

Openshaw
Party	Candidate	Votes	%	±%
Labour	J. Casson	uncontested		
Labour hold		Swing		

=== Miles Platting, 19 September 1935 ===
Caused by the death of Councillor Charles Edward Wood (Labour, Miles Platting, elected 1 November 1927; previously 1919-22) on 15 August 1935.

Miles Platting
Party	Candidate	Votes	%	±%
Labour	F. C. Mason	uncontested		
Labour hold		Swing		
