= Oxford (Manchester ward) =

- Ward
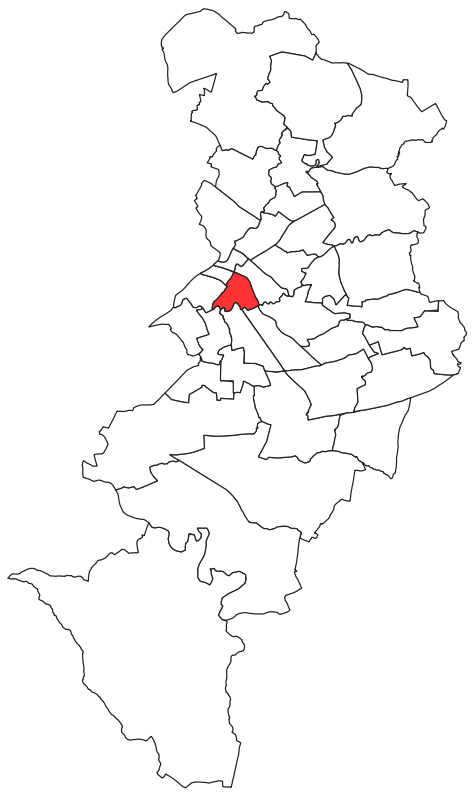
- Oxford ward (1931) within Manchester

- Coat of arms
- Country: United Kingdom
- Constituent country: England
- Region: North West England
- County borough: Manchester
- Created: December 1838
- Named for: Oxford Street, Manchester

Government
  - Type: Unicameral
  - Body: Manchester City Council
- UK Parliamentary Constituency: Manchester Exchange

Oxford was an electoral division of Manchester City Council which was represented from 1838 until 1950. It covered part of Manchester city centre including the area surrounding Oxford Street and Canal Street.

== Overview ==
Oxford ward was one of the fifteen municipal wards created in 1838, when the Manchester Borough Council was granted a Charter of Incorporation under the provisions of the Municipal Corporations Act 1835.

Initially, the ward's boundaries corresponded with those of Districts No.7 (Minshull Street) and No.10 (Oxford Street) of the Manchester Township, which covered the area of Manchester city centre on the north bank of the River Medlock. Its original boundaries remained in place until 1919 when the northern portion of the former St. James' ward, including what is now Chinatown was transferred to the ward. In 1950, the ward was abolished, and its area became part of the new St. Peter's ward.

From 1838 until 1885, the ward formed part of the Manchester Parliamentary constituency. From 1885 until 1918, it was part of the Manchester North West Parliamentary constituency. From 1918 until its abolition, it was part of the Manchester Exchange Parliamentary constituency.

== Councillors ==
Election	Councillor	Councillor	Councillor
1838	Samuel Stocks (Lib)	Richard Roberts (Lib)	Henry Tootal (Lib)
May 1839	Samuel Stocks (Lib)	Richard Roberts (Lib)	Samuel Lowcock (Lib)
1839	Samuel Stocks (Lib)	Richard Roberts (Lib)	Samuel Lowcock (Lib)
1840	Samuel Stocks (Lib)	Richard Roberts (Lib)	Samuel Lowcock (Lib)
1841	Thomas Gatenby (Lib)	Richard Roberts (Lib)	Samuel Lowcock (Lib)
1842	Thomas Gatenby (Lib)	Richard Roberts (Lib)	Samuel Lowcock (Lib)
1843	Thomas Gatenby (Lib)	James Bake (Lib)	Samuel Lowcock (Lib)
1844	Thomas Gatenby (Lib)	James Bake (Lib)	Samuel Lowcock (Lib)
1845	Thomas Gatenby (Lib)	Richard Roberts (Lib)	John Gyte (Lib)
(1845–1872)
1872	S. Ingham (Con)	L. Rostron (Con)	J. F. Roberts (Lib)
1873	S. Ingham (Con)	L. Rostron (Con)	J. F. Roberts (Lib)
1874	S. Ingham (Con)	L. Rostron (Con)	J. F. Roberts (Lib)
1875	S. Ingham (Con)	L. Rostron (Con)	J. F. Roberts (Lib)
1876	S. Ingham (Con)	M. Hilton (Lib)	J. F. Roberts (Lib)
1877	G. Watts (Lib)	M. Hilton (Lib)	J. F. Roberts (Lib)
1878	G. Watts (Lib)	M. Hilton (Lib)	J. F. Roberts (Lib)
1879	G. Watts (Lib)	M. Hilton (Lib)	J. F. Roberts (Lib)
1880	B. T. Leech (Lib)	M. Hilton (Lib)	J. F. Roberts (Lib)
1881	B. T. Leech (Lib)	M. Hilton (Lib)	J. F. Roberts (Lib)
1882	B. T. Leech (Lib)	G. Clay (Lib)	J. F. Roberts (Lib)
1883	B. T. Leech (Lib)	G. Clay (Lib)	J. F. Roberts (Lib)
1884	B. T. Leech (Lib)	G. Clay (Lib)	J. F. Roberts (Lib)
1885	B. T. Leech (Lib)	G. Clay (Lib)	B. Gibbons (Con)
1886	B. T. Leech (Lib)	G. Clay (Lib U)	B. Gibbons (Con)
1887	B. T. Leech (Lib)	G. Clay (Lib U)	B. Gibbons (Con)
1888	B. T. Leech (Lib)	G. Clay (Lib U)	B. Gibbons (Con)
1889	B. T. Leech (Lib)	G. Clay (Lib U)	B. Gibbons (Con)
November 1889	B. T. Leech (Lib)	G. Clay (Lib U)	H. Simpson (Con)
1890	B. T. Leech (Lib)	G. Clay (Lib U)	H. Simpson (Con)
September 1891	J. H. Greenhow (Lib)	G. Clay (Lib U)	H. Simpson (Con)
1891	J. H. Greenhow (Lib)	G. Clay (Lib U)	H. Simpson (Con)
1892	J. H. Greenhow (Lib)	G. Clay (Lib U)	H. Simpson (Con)
February 1893	J. H. Greenhow (Lib)	W. Simpson (Lib)	H. Simpson (Con)
1893	J. H. Greenhow (Lib)	W. Simpson (Lib)	H. Simpson (Con)
1894	J. H. Greenhow (Lib)	W. Simpson (Lib)	H. Simpson (Con)
1895	J. H. Greenhow (Lib)	W. Simpson (Lib)	H. Simpson (Con)
1896	J. H. Greenhow (Lib)	W. Simpson (Lib)	J. J. Lambert (Con)
1897	J. H. Greenhow (Lib)	W. Simpson (Lib)	J. J. Lambert (Con)
1898	J. H. Greenhow (Lib)	W. Simpson (Lib)	J. J. Lambert (Con)
1899	J. H. Greenhow (Lib)	W. Simpson (Lib)	J. J. Lambert (Con)
1900	J. H. Greenhow (Lib)	G. Simpson (Con)	J. J. Lambert (Con)
1901	J. Pitt-Hardacre (Ind)	G. Simpson (Con)	J. J. Lambert (Con)
1902	J. Pitt-Hardacre (Ind)	G. Simpson (Con)	A. Burgon (Lib)
1903	J. Pitt-Hardacre (Ind)	C. Behrens (Lib)	A. Burgon (Lib)
1904	H. Elverston (Lib)	C. Behrens (Lib)	A. Burgon (Lib)
1905	H. Elverston (Lib)	C. Behrens (Lib)	A. Burgon (Lib)
1906	H. Elverston (Lib)	C. Behrens (Lib)	A. Burgon (Lib)
1907	H. Elverston (Lib)	C. Behrens (Lib)	A. Burgon (Lib)
1908	H. Elverston (Lib)	C. Behrens (Lib)	A. Burgon (Lib)
1909	H. Elverston (Lib)	C. Behrens (Lib)	A. Burgon (Lib)
1910	W. Tattersall (Lib)	C. Behrens (Lib)	A. Burgon (Lib)
1911	W. Tattersall (Lib)	C. Behrens (Lib)	W. B. Midgley (Con)
1912	W. Tattersall (Lib)	C. Behrens (Lib)	W. B. Midgley (Con)
1913	W. Tattersall (Lib)	C. Behrens (Lib)	W. B. Midgley (Con)
1914	W. Tattersall (Lib)	C. Behrens (Lib)	W. B. Midgley (Con)
1919	W. Tattersall (Lib)	R. Noton Barclay (Lib)	O. P. Lancashire (Con)
1920	R. W. Shepherd (Con)	R. Noton Barclay (Lib)	O. P. Lancashire (Con)
1921	R. W. Shepherd (Con)	R. Noton Barclay (Lib)	O. P. Lancashire (Con)
1922	R. W. Shepherd (Con)	R. Noton Barclay (Lib)	O. P. Lancashire (Con)
1923	R. W. Shepherd (Con)	R. Noton Barclay (Lib)	O. P. Lancashire (Con)
1924	R. W. Shepherd (Con)	R. Noton Barclay (Lib)	O. P. Lancashire (Con)
1925	R. W. Shepherd (Con)	R. Noton Barclay (Lib)	O. P. Lancashire (Con)
1926	R. W. Shepherd (Con)	R. Noton Barclay (Lib)	O. P. Lancashire (Con)
1927	R. W. Shepherd (Con)	R. Noton Barclay (Lib)	O. P. Lancashire (Con)
1928	R. W. Shepherd (Con)	R. Noton Barclay (Lib)	O. P. Lancashire (Con)
1929	R. W. Shepherd (Con)	R. Noton Barclay (Lib)	O. P. Lancashire (Con)
1930	R. W. Shepherd (Con)	R. Noton Barclay (Lib)	O. P. Lancashire (Con)
1931	R. W. Shepherd (Con)	R. Noton Barclay (Lib)	O. P. Lancashire (Con)
1932	R. W. Shepherd (Con)	R. Noton Barclay (Lib)	O. P. Lancashire (Con)
April 1933	R. W. Shepherd (Con)	R. Noton Barclay (Lib)	O. P. Lancashire (Con)
1933	R. W. Shepherd (Con)	R. Noton Barclay (Lib)	W. R. Sutton (Con)
July 1934	C. B. Walker (Con)	R. Noton Barclay (Lib)	W. R. Sutton (Con)
1934	C. B. Walker (Con)	J. T. Griffiths (Lib)	W. R. Sutton (Con)
1935	C. B. Walker (Con)	J. T. Griffiths (Lib)	W. R. Sutton (Con)
1936	C. B. Walker (Con)	J. T. Griffiths (Lib)	W. R. Sutton (Con)
1937	C. B. Walker (Con)	A. Ellison (Ind)	W. R. Sutton (Con)
1938	C. B. Walker (Con)	A. Ellison (Ind)	W. R. Sutton (Con)
1945	S. A. Gradwell (Con)	C. B. Walker (Con)	G. B. Cary (Con)
1946	S. A. Gradwell (Con)	C. B. Walker (Con)	G. B. Cary (Con)
1947	S. A. Gradwell (Con)	C. B. Walker (Con)	G. B. Cary (Con)
1949	S. A. Gradwell (Con)	C. B. Walker (Con)	G. B. Cary (Con)

== Elections ==
=== Elections in 1830s ===
==== December 1838 ====
1838 (3 vacancies)
Party	Candidate	Votes	%	±%
Liberal	Samuel Stocks	199	100.0	
Liberal	Richard Roberts	198	99.5	
Liberal	Henry Tootal	198	99.5	
Turnout		199		
Liberal win (new seat)				
Liberal win (new seat)				
Liberal win (new seat)				

==== May 1839 ====
By-election: 16 May 1839
Party	Candidate	Votes	%	±%
Liberal	Samuel Lowcock	uncontested		
Liberal hold		Swing		

==== November 1839 ====
1839
Party	Candidate	Votes	%	±%
Liberal	Samuel Lowcock*	uncontested		
Liberal hold		Swing		

=== Elections in 1840s ===
==== November 1840 ====
1840
Party	Candidate	Votes	%	±%
Liberal	Richard Roberts*	uncontested		
Liberal hold		Swing		

==== November 1841 ====
1841
Party	Candidate	Votes	%	±%
Liberal	Thomas Gatenby	uncontested		
Liberal hold		Swing		

==== November 1842 ====
1842
Party	Candidate	Votes	%	±%
Liberal	Samuel Lowcock*	153	59.3	N/A
Liberal	Abel Heywood	105	40.7	N/A
Majority		48	18.6	N/A
Turnout		258		
Liberal hold		Swing		

==== November 1843 ====
1843
Party	Candidate	Votes	%	±%
Liberal	James Bake	86	51.2	−8.1
Liberal	George Macbeath	82	48.8	+8.1
Majority		4	2.4	
Turnout		168		
Liberal hold		Swing		

==== November 1844 ====
1844
Party	Candidate	Votes	%	±%
Liberal	Thomas Gatenby*	uncontested		
Liberal hold		Swing		

==== November 1845 ====
1845
Party	Candidate	Votes	%	±%
Liberal	John Gyte	uncontested		
Liberal hold		Swing		

=== Elections in 1870s ===
==== November 1872 ====
1872
Party	Candidate	Votes	%	±%
Liberal	J. F. Roberts*	537	52.6	
Conservative	J. Henstock	484	47.4	
Majority		53	5.2	
Turnout		1,021		
Liberal hold		Swing		

==== November 1873 ====
1873
Party	Candidate	Votes	%	±%
Conservative	L. Rostron*	540	51.6	+4.2
Liberal	J. W. Southern	506	48.4	−4.2
Majority		34	3.2	
Turnout		1,046		
Conservative hold		Swing		

==== November 1874 ====
1874
Party	Candidate	Votes	%	±%
Conservative	S. Ingham*	517	54.2	+2.6
Liberal	M. Hilton	436	45.8	−2.6
Majority		81	8.4	+5.2
Turnout		953		
Conservative hold		Swing		

==== November 1875 ====
1875
Party	Candidate	Votes	%	±%
Liberal	J. F. Roberts*	uncontested		
Liberal hold		Swing		

==== November 1876 ====
1876
Party	Candidate	Votes	%	±%
Liberal	M. Hilton	465	52.2	N/A
Conservative	R. T. Walker	425	47.8	N/A
Majority		40	4.4	N/A
Turnout		890		
Liberal gain from Conservative		Swing		

==== November 1877 ====
1877
Party	Candidate	Votes	%	±%
Liberal	G. Watts	587	55.0	+2.8
Conservative	S. Redfern	480	45.0	−2.8
Majority		107	10.0	+5.6
Turnout		1,067		
Liberal gain from Conservative		Swing		

==== November 1878 ====
1878
Party	Candidate	Votes	%	±%
Liberal	J. F. Roberts*	uncontested		
Liberal hold		Swing		

==== November 1879 ====
1879
Party	Candidate	Votes	%	±%
Liberal	M. Hilton*	uncontested		
Liberal hold		Swing		

=== Elections in 1880s ===
==== November 1880 ====
1880
Party	Candidate	Votes	%	±%
Liberal	B. T. Leech	uncontested		
Liberal hold		Swing		

==== November 1881 ====
1881
Party	Candidate	Votes	%	±%
Liberal	J. F. Roberts*	uncontested		
Liberal hold		Swing		

==== November 1882 ====
1882
Party	Candidate	Votes	%	±%
Liberal	G. Clay	uncontested		
Liberal hold		Swing		

==== November 1883 ====
1883
Party	Candidate	Votes	%	±%
Liberal	B. T. Leech*	uncontested		
Liberal hold		Swing		

==== November 1884 ====
1884
Party	Candidate	Votes	%	±%
Liberal	J. F. Roberts*	uncontested		
Liberal hold		Swing		

==== November 1885 ====
1885
Party	Candidate	Votes	%	±%
Liberal	G. Clay*	uncontested		
Liberal hold		Swing		

==== November 1886 ====
1886
Party	Candidate	Votes	%	±%
Liberal	B. T. Leech*	uncontested		
Liberal hold		Swing		

==== November 1887 ====
1887
Party	Candidate	Votes	%	±%
Conservative	B. Gibbons*	uncontested		
Conservative hold		Swing		

==== November 1888 ====
1888
Party	Candidate	Votes	%	±%
Liberal Unionist	G. Clay*	uncontested		
Liberal Unionist hold		Swing		

==== November 1889 ====
1889
Party	Candidate	Votes	%	±%
Liberal	B. T. Leech*	uncontested		
Liberal hold		Swing		

==== November 1889 (by-election) ====
By-election: 18 November 1889
Party	Candidate	Votes	%	±%
Conservative	H. Simpson	uncontested		
Conservative hold		Swing		

=== Elections in 1890s ===
==== November 1890 ====
1890
Party	Candidate	Votes	%	±%
Conservative	H. Simpson*	383	50.2	N/A
Liberal	J. H. Greenhow	380	49.8	N/A
Majority		3	0.4	N/A
Turnout		763		
Conservative hold		Swing		

==== September 1891 (by-election) ====
By-election: 14 September 1891
Party	Candidate	Votes	%	±%
Liberal	J. H. Greenhow	uncontested		
Liberal hold		Swing		

==== November 1891 ====
1891
Party	Candidate	Votes	%	±%
Liberal Unionist	G. Clay*	526	60.3	N/A
Liberal	S. Sharp	346	39.7	−10.1
Majority		180	20.6	
Turnout		872		
Liberal Unionist hold		Swing		

==== November 1892 ====
1892
Party	Candidate	Votes	%	±%
Liberal	J. H. Greenhow*	uncontested		
Liberal hold		Swing		

==== February 1893 (by-election) ====
By-election: 28 February 1893
Party	Candidate	Votes	%	±%
Liberal	W. Simpson	423	54.7	N/A
Conservative	J. J. Lambert	350	45.3	N/A
Majority		73	9.4	N/A
Turnout		773		
Liberal gain from Liberal Unionist		Swing		

==== November 1893 ====
1893
Party	Candidate	Votes	%	±%
Conservative	H. Simpson*	uncontested		
Conservative hold		Swing		

==== November 1894 ====
1894
Party	Candidate	Votes	%	±%
Liberal	W. Simpson*	uncontested		
Liberal hold		Swing		

==== November 1895 ====
1895
Party	Candidate	Votes	%	±%
Liberal	J. H. Greenhow*	uncontested		
Liberal hold		Swing		

==== November 1896 ====
1896
Party	Candidate	Votes	%	±%
Conservative	J. J. Lambert*	uncontested		
Conservative hold		Swing		

==== November 1897 ====
1897
Party	Candidate	Votes	%	±%
Liberal	W. Simpson*	uncontested		
Liberal hold		Swing		

==== November 1898 ====
1898
Party	Candidate	Votes	%	±%
Liberal	J. H. Greenhow*	uncontested		
Liberal hold		Swing		

==== November 1899 ====
1899
Party	Candidate	Votes	%	±%
Conservative	J. J. Lambert*	uncontested		
Conservative hold		Swing		

=== Elections in 1900s ===
==== November 1900 ====
1900
Party	Candidate	Votes	%	±%
Conservative	G. Simpson	325	51.9	N/A
Liberal	A. Burgon	301	48.1	N/A
Majority		24	3.8	N/A
Turnout		626		
Conservative gain from Liberal		Swing		

==== November 1901 ====
1901
Party	Candidate	Votes	%	±%
Independent	J. Pitt Hardacre	372	52.3	N/A
Liberal	J. H. Greenhow*	339	47.7	−0.4
Majority		33	4.6	
Turnout		711		
Independent gain from Liberal		Swing		

==== November 1902 ====
1902
Party	Candidate	Votes	%	±%
Liberal	A. Burgon	376	56.6	+8.9
Conservative	W. T. Hill	288	43.4	N/A
Majority		88	13.2	
Turnout		664		
Liberal gain from Conservative		Swing		

==== November 1903 ====
1903
Party	Candidate	Votes	%	±%
Liberal	C. Behrens	uncontested		
Liberal gain from Conservative		Swing		

==== November 1904 ====
1904
Party	Candidate	Votes	%	±%
Liberal	H. Elverston	498	71.7	N/A
Independent	J. Pitt Hardacre*	197	28.3	N/A
Majority		301	43.4	N/A
Turnout		695		
Liberal gain from Independent		Swing		

==== November 1905 ====
1905
Party	Candidate	Votes	%	±%
Liberal	A. Burgon*	412	66.8	−4.9
Conservative	W. B. Midgley	205	33.2	N/A
Majority		207	33.6	−9.8
Turnout		617		
Liberal hold		Swing		

==== November 1906 ====
1906
Party	Candidate	Votes	%	±%
Liberal	C. Behrens*	uncontested		
Liberal hold		Swing		

==== November 1907 ====
1907
Party	Candidate	Votes	%	±%
Liberal	H. Elverston*	uncontested		
Liberal hold		Swing		

==== November 1908 ====
1908
Party	Candidate	Votes	%	±%
Liberal	A. Burgon*	416	60.5	N/A
Conservative	A. R. Besso	272	39.5	N/A
Majority		144	21.0	N/A
Turnout		688		
Liberal hold		Swing		

==== November 1909 ====
1909
Party	Candidate	Votes	%	±%
Liberal	C. Behrens*	uncontested		
Liberal hold		Swing		

=== Elections in 1910s ===
==== November 1910 ====
1910
Party	Candidate	Votes	%	±%
Liberal	W. Tattersall	uncontested		
Liberal hold		Swing		

==== November 1911 ====
1911
Party	Candidate	Votes	%	±%
Conservative	W. B. Midgley	408	59.0	N/A
Liberal	A. Burgon*	284	41.0	N/A
Majority		124	18.0	N/A
Turnout		692		
Conservative gain from Liberal		Swing		

==== November 1912 ====
1912
Party	Candidate	Votes	%	±%
Liberal	C. Behrens*	uncontested		
Liberal hold		Swing		

==== November 1913 ====
1913
Party	Candidate	Votes	%	±%
Liberal	W. Tattersall*	uncontested		
Liberal hold		Swing		

==== November 1914 ====
1914
Party	Candidate	Votes	%	±%
Conservative	W. B. Midgley*	uncontested		
Conservative hold		Swing		

==== November 1919 ====
1919 (new boundaries)
Party	Candidate	Votes	%	±%
Liberal	R. Noton Barclay*	355	51.7	
Conservative	R. W. Shepherd*	331	48.3	
Majority		24	3.5	
Turnout		686	24.5	
Liberal hold		Swing		

=== Elections in 1920s ===
==== November 1920 ====
1920
Party	Candidate	Votes	%	±%
Conservative	R. W. Shepherd	615	56.3	+8.0
Liberal	A. England	477	43.7	−8.0
Majority		138	12.6	
Turnout		1,092	39.1	+14.6
Conservative gain from Liberal		Swing		

==== November 1921 ====
1921
Party	Candidate	Votes	%	±%
Conservative	O. P. Lancashire*	uncontested		
Conservative hold		Swing		

==== November 1922 ====
1922
Party	Candidate	Votes	%	±%
Liberal	R. Noton Barclay*	uncontested		
Liberal hold		Swing		

==== November 1923 ====
1923
Party	Candidate	Votes	%	±%
Conservative	R. W. Shepherd*	uncontested		
Conservative hold		Swing		

==== November 1924 ====
1924
Party	Candidate	Votes	%	±%
Conservative	O. P. Lancashire*	uncontested		
Conservative hold		Swing		

==== November 1925 ====
1925
Party	Candidate	Votes	%	±%
Liberal	R. Noton Barclay*	uncontested		
Liberal hold		Swing		

==== November 1926 ====
1926
Party	Candidate	Votes	%	±%
Conservative	R. W. Shepherd*	636	61.9	N/A
Liberal	A. Todd	391	38.1	N/A
Majority		245	23.8	N/A
Turnout		1,027	37.4	N/A
Conservative hold		Swing		

==== November 1927 ====
1927
Party	Candidate	Votes	%	±%
Conservative	O. P. Lancashire*	uncontested		
Conservative hold		Swing		

==== November 1928 ====
1928
Party	Candidate	Votes	%	±%
Liberal	R. Noton Barclay*	806	97.3	N/A
Residents	A. R. Edwards	22	2.7	N/A
Majority		784	94.6	N/A
Turnout		4,625	828	N/A
Liberal hold		Swing		

==== November 1929 ====
1929
Party	Candidate	Votes	%	±%
Conservative	R. W. Shepherd*	uncontested		
Conservative hold		Swing		

=== Elections in 1930s ===
==== November 1930 ====
1930
Party	Candidate	Votes	%	±%
Conservative	O. P. Lancashire*	uncontested		
Conservative hold		Swing		

==== November 1931 ====
1931
Party	Candidate	Votes	%	±%
Liberal	R. Noton Barclay*	uncontested		
Liberal hold		Swing		

==== November 1932 ====
1932
Party	Candidate	Votes	%	±%
Conservative	R. W. Shepherd*	uncontested		
Conservative hold		Swing		

==== April 1933 (by-election) ====
By-election: 18 April 1933
Party	Candidate	Votes	%	±%
Liberal	R. Noton Barclay*	uncontested		
Liberal hold		Swing		

==== November 1933 ====
1933
Party	Candidate	Votes	%	±%
Conservative	W. R. Sutton	uncontested		
Conservative hold		Swing		

==== July 1934 (by-election) ====
By-election: 19 July 1934
Party	Candidate	Votes	%	±%
Conservative	C. B. Walker	289	57.5	N/A
Independent	A. Ellison	214	42.5	N/A
Majority		75	15.0	N/A
Turnout		503		
Conservative hold		Swing		

==== November 1934 ====
1934
Party	Candidate	Votes	%	±%
Liberal	J. T. Griffiths	394	55.3	N/A
Independent	A. Ellison	319	44.7	N/A
Majority		75	10.6	N/A
Turnout		713		
Liberal hold		Swing		

==== November 1935 ====
1935
Party	Candidate	Votes	%	±%
Conservative	C. B. Walker*	438	54.5	N/A
Independent	A. Ellison	365	45.5	+0.8
Majority		73	9.0	
Turnout		803		
Conservative hold		Swing		

==== November 1936 ====
1936
Party	Candidate	Votes	%	±%
Conservative	W. R. Sutton*	uncontested		
Conservative hold		Swing		

==== November 1937 ====
1937
Party	Candidate	Votes	%	±%
Independent	A. Ellison	405	53.6	N/A
Liberal	J. T. Griffiths*	351	46.4	N/A
Majority		54	7.2	N/A
Turnout		756		
Independent gain from Liberal		Swing		

==== November 1938 ====
1938
Party	Candidate	Votes	%	±%
Conservative	C. B. Walker*	uncontested		
Conservative hold		Swing		

=== Elections in 1940s ===
==== November 1945 ====
1945 (2 vacancies)
Party	Candidate	Votes	%	±%
Conservative	G. B. Cary	401	85.3	N/A
Conservative	S. A. Gradwell*	397	84.5	N/A
Labour	B. Starkie	69	14.7	N/A
Labour	R. Thomas	69	14.7	N/A
Majority		328	69.8	N/A
Turnout		470		
Conservative hold		Swing		
Conservative hold		Swing		

==== November 1946 ====
1946
Party	Candidate	Votes	%	±%
Conservative	C. B. Walker*	350	89.5	+4.2
Labour	F. Donion	41	10.5	−4.2
Majority		309	79.0	+9.2
Turnout		391		
Conservative hold		Swing		

==== November 1947 ====
1947
Party	Candidate	Votes	%	±%
Conservative	S. A. Gradwell*	uncontested		
Conservative hold		Swing		

==== May 1949 ====
1949
Party	Candidate	Votes	%	±%
Conservative	G. B. Cary*	uncontested		
Conservative hold		Swing		

== See also ==
- Manchester City Council
- Manchester City Council elections
