= Medlock Street (ward) =

- Ward
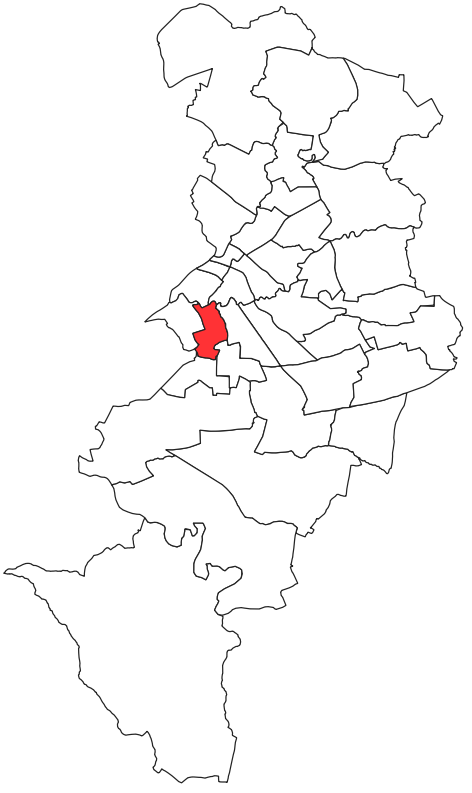
- Medlock Street ward (1931) within Manchester

- Coat of arms
- Country: United Kingdom
- Constituent country: England
- Region: North West England
- County borough: Manchester
- Created: December 1838
- Named for: Medlock Street, Hulme

Government
  - Type: Unicameral
  - Body: Manchester City Council
- UK Parliamentary Constituency: Manchester Exchange

Medlock Street was an electoral division of Manchester City Council which was represented from 1838 until 1950. It covered a part of Hulme.

== Overview ==
Medlock Street ward was one of the fifteen municipal wards created in 1838, when the Manchester Borough Council was granted a Charter of Incorporation under the provisions of the Municipal Corporations Act 1835.

Initially, the ward covered the eastern half of Hulme township, which had been absorbed into Manchester by the borough's Charter of Incorporation. Its original boundaries remained in place until 1919, when an area to the east of Radnor Street was transferred to the ward from the St. George's ward. The ward was abolished in 1950, with its remaining area being divided between the All Saints' ward and the new St. Peter's ward.

From 1838 until 1885, the ward formed part of the Manchester Parliamentary constituency. From 1885 until 1918, it was part of the Manchester South West Parliamentary constituency. From 1918 until 1950, it was part of the Manchester Hulme Parliamentary constituency. It briefly formed part of the Manchester Exchange Parliamentary constituency from 1950 until its abolition.

== Councillors ==
Election	Councillor	Councillor	Councillor
1838	Abraham Smith (Lib)	John Richardson White (Lib)	John Naylor (Lib)
1839	Abraham Smith (Lib)	John Richardson White (Lib)	John Naylor (Lib)
1840	Abraham Smith (Lib)	John Richardson White (Lib)	John Naylor (Lib)
1841	Thomas Wheeler (Lib)	John Richardson White (Lib)	John Naylor (Lib)
1842	Thomas Wheeler (Lib)	John Richardson White (Lib)	Frederick Phillips (Lib)
1843	Thomas Wheeler (Lib)	John Richardson White (Lib)	Frederick Phillips (Lib)
1844	John Chapman (Lib)	John Richardson White (Lib)	Frederick Phillips (Lib)
1845	John Chapman (Lib)	John Richardson White (Lib)	Matthew Tomlinson (Lib)
(1845–1872)
1872	J. Craven (Con)	J. Marshall (Con)	M. Price (Lib)
1873	J. Craven (Con)	J. Marshall (Con)	M. Price (Lib)
1874	J. Craven (Con)	J. Marshall (Con)	M. Price (Lib)
1875	J. Craven (Con)	J. Marshall (Con)	D. Greenwood (Lib)
1876	J. Craven (Con)	A. Evans (Lib)	D. Greenwood (Lib)
1877	J. Craven (Con)	A. Evans (Lib)	D. Greenwood (Lib)
1878	J. Craven (Con)	A. Evans (Lib)	D. Greenwood (Lib)
1879	J. Craven (Con)	A. Evans (Lib)	D. Greenwood (Lib)
1880	J. Craven (Con)	A. Evans (Lib)	D. Greenwood (Lib)
1881	J. Craven (Con)	A. Evans (Lib)	D. Greenwood (Lib)
1882	J. Craven (Con)	A. Evans (Lib)	D. Greenwood (Lib)
1883	J. Craven (Con)	A. Evans (Lib)	D. Greenwood (Lib)
1884	J. Craven (Con)	A. Evans (Lib)	W. Deakin (Con)
1885	J. Craven (Con)	A. Evans (Lib)	W. Deakin (Con)
May 1886	H. H. Mainwaring (Con)	A. Evans (Lib)	W. Deakin (Con)
1886	H. H. Mainwaring (Con)	A. Evans (Lib)	W. Deakin (Con)
October 1887	H. H. Mainwaring (Con)	W. T. Bax (Lib)	W. Deakin (Con)
1887	H. H. Mainwaring (Con)	W. T. Bax (Lib)	H. Cardwell (Con)
1888	H. H. Mainwaring (Con)	W. T. Bax (Lib)	H. Cardwell (Con)
1889	H. H. Mainwaring (Con)	W. T. Bax (Lib)	H. Cardwell (Con)
1890	H. H. Mainwaring (Con)	W. T. Bax (Lib)	H. Cardwell (Con)
1891	H. H. Mainwaring (Con)	W. T. Bax (Lib)	H. Cardwell (Con)
1892	H. H. Mainwaring (Con)	W. T. Bax (Lib)	H. Cardwell (Con)
1893	H. H. Mainwaring (Con)	W. T. Bax (Lib)	H. Cardwell (Con)
1894	H. H. Mainwaring (Con)	W. T. Bax (Lib)	H. Cardwell (Con)
November 1894	H. H. Mainwaring (Con)	W. T. Bax (Lib)	N. Bradley (Lib U)
1895	H. H. Mainwaring (Con)	W. T. Bax (Lib)	N. Bradley (Lib U)
1896	H. H. Mainwaring (Con)	W. T. Bax (Lib)	N. Bradley (Lib U)
1897	H. H. Mainwaring (Con)	W. T. Bax (Lib)	N. Bradley (Lib U)
May 1898	W. H. Hesketh (Con)	W. T. Bax (Lib)	N. Bradley (Lib U)
1898	W. H. Hesketh (Con)	W. T. Bax (Lib)	N. Bradley (Lib U)
February 1899	W. H. Hesketh (Con)	W. Kemp (Con)	N. Bradley (Lib U)
1899	W. H. Hesketh (Con)	W. Kemp (Con)	J. D. Pennington (Lib)
1900	W. H. Hesketh (Con)	W. Kemp (Con)	J. D. Pennington (Lib)
1901	W. H. Hesketh (Con)	W. Kemp (Con)	J. D. Pennington (Lib)
November 1901	W. H. Hesketh (Con)	A. W. Chapman (Con)	J. D. Pennington (Lib)
1902	W. H. Hesketh (Con)	A. W. Chapman (Con)	J. D. Pennington (Lib)
1903	W. H. Hesketh (Con)	A. W. Chapman (Con)	J. D. Pennington (Lib)
1904	H. White (Con)	A. W. Chapman (Con)	J. D. Pennington (Lib)
1905	H. White (Con)	A. W. Chapman (Con)	J. D. Pennington (Lib)
1906	H. White (Con)	A. W. Chapman (Con)	J. D. Pennington (Lib)
1907	H. White (Con)	A. W. Chapman (Con)	J. D. Pennington (Lib)
1908	H. White (Con)	A. W. Chapman (Con)	S. Woollam (Con)
1909	H. White (Con)	A. W. Chapman (Con)	S. Woollam (Con)
1910	W. G. Lecomber (Con)	A. W. Chapman (Con)	S. Woollam (Con)
1911	W. G. Lecomber (Con)	A. W. Chapman (Con)	S. Woollam (Con)
1912	W. G. Lecomber (Con)	A. W. Chapman (Con)	S. Woollam (Con)
1913	W. J. Pine (Con)	A. W. Chapman (Con)	S. Woollam (Con)
1914	W. J. Pine (Con)	A. W. Chapman (Con)	S. Woollam (Con)
1919	W. J. Pine (Con)	C. H. S. Redmond (Con)	S. Woollam (Con)
1920	W. J. Pine (Con)	C. H. S. Redmond (Con)	S. Woollam (Con)
1921	W. J. Pine (Con)	C. H. S. Redmond (Con)	S. Woollam (Con)
1922	W. J. Pine (Con)	C. H. S. Redmond (Con)	S. Woollam (Con)
1923	W. J. Pine (Con)	C. H. S. Redmond (Con)	S. Woollam (Con)
1924	W. J. Pine (Con)	C. H. S. Redmond (Con)	S. Woollam (Con)
1925	W. J. Pine (Con)	C. H. S. Redmond (Con)	S. Woollam (Con)
November 1925	W. J. Pine (Con)	C. H. S. Redmond (Con)	S. H. Holden Wood (Con)
1926	E. Chorlton (Lab)	C. H. S. Redmond (Con)	S. H. Holden Wood (Con)
1927	E. Chorlton (Lab)	C. H. S. Redmond (Con)	E. L. Jones (Lab)
1928	E. Chorlton (Lab)	F. K. Edwards (Lab)	E. L. Jones (Lab)
1929	E. Chorlton (Lab)	F. K. Edwards (Lab)	E. L. Jones (Lab)
1930	E. Chorlton (Lab)	F. K. Edwards (Lab)	E. L. Jones (Lab)
1931	E. Chorlton (Lab)	P. T. Barnes (Con)	E. L. Jones (Lab)
1932	J. Gorman (Lab)	P. T. Barnes (Con)	E. L. Jones (Lab)
1933	J. Gorman (Lab)	P. T. Barnes (Con)	E. L. Jones (Lab)
1934	J. Gorman (Lab)	P. T. Barnes (Con)	E. L. Jones (Lab)
1935	J. Gorman (Lab)	P. T. Barnes (Con)	E. L. Jones (Lab)
1936	J. Gorman (Lab)	P. T. Barnes (Con)	E. L. Jones (Lab)
1937	J. Gorman (Lab)	J. Owen (Lab)	E. L. Jones (Lab)
1938	J. Gorman (Lab)	J. Owen (Lab)	E. L. Jones (Lab)
1945	J. Gorman (Lab)	J. Owen (CPGB)	A. Littlemore (Lab)
1946	J. Gorman (Lab)	M. Conway (Lab)	A. Littlemore (Lab)
1947	A. Lees (Con)	M. Conway (Lab)	A. Littlemore (Lab)
1949	A. Lees (Con)	M. Conway (Lab)	A. Littlemore (Lab)

== Elections ==
=== Elections in 1830s ===
==== December 1838 ====
1838 (3 vacancies)
Party	Candidate	Votes	%	±%
Liberal	Abraham Smith	179	100.0	
Liberal	John Richardson White	178	99.4	
Liberal	John Naylor	175	97.8	
Turnout		179		
Liberal win (new seat)				
Liberal win (new seat)				
Liberal win (new seat)				

==== November 1839 ====
1839
Party	Candidate	Votes	%	±%
Liberal	John Naylor*	uncontested		
Liberal hold		Swing		

=== Elections in 1840s ===
==== November 1840 ====
1840
Party	Candidate	Votes	%	±%
Liberal	John Richardson White*	uncontested		
Liberal hold		Swing		

==== November 1841 ====
1841
Party	Candidate	Votes	%	±%
Liberal	Thomas Wheeler	uncontested		
Liberal hold		Swing		

==== November 1842 ====
1842
Party	Candidate	Votes	%	±%
Liberal	Frederick Phillips*	uncontested		
Liberal hold		Swing		

==== November 1843 ====
1843
Party	Candidate	Votes	%	±%
Liberal	John Richardson White*	uncontested		
Liberal hold		Swing		

==== November 1844 ====
1844
Party	Candidate	Votes	%	±%
Liberal	John Chapman*	uncontested		
Liberal hold		Swing		

==== November 1845 ====
1845
Party	Candidate	Votes	%	±%
Liberal	Matthew Tomlinson*	180	52.8	N/A
Residents	Abraham Dearden	161	47.2	N/A
Majority		19	5.6	N/A
Turnout		341		
Liberal hold		Swing		

=== Elections in 1870s ===
==== November 1872 ====
1872
Party	Candidate	Votes	%	±%
Liberal	M. Price	1,430	50.1	
Conservative	G. Cunningham*	1,424	49.9	
Majority		6	0.2	
Turnout		2,854		
Liberal gain from Conservative		Swing		

==== November 1873 ====
1873
Party	Candidate	Votes	%	±%
Conservative	J. Marshall*	1,691	52.3	+2.4
Liberal	H. F. Blair	1,542	47.7	−2.4
Majority		149	4.6	
Turnout		3,233		
Conservative hold		Swing		

==== November 1874 ====
1874
Party	Candidate	Votes	%	±%
Conservative	J. Craven*	uncontested		
Conservative hold		Swing		

==== November 1875 ====
1875
Party	Candidate	Votes	%	±%
Liberal	D. Greenwood	1,619	55.2	N/A
Conservative	E. K. Norris	1,316	44.8	N/A
Majority		303	10.4	N/A
Turnout		2,935		
Liberal hold		Swing		

==== November 1876 ====
1876
Party	Candidate	Votes	%	±%
Liberal	A. Evans*	1,677	58.4	+3.2
Conservative	G. Anderton	1,195	41.6	−3.2
Majority		482	16.8	+6.4
Turnout		2,872		
Liberal hold		Swing		

==== November 1877 ====
1877
Party	Candidate	Votes	%	±%
Conservative	J. Craven*	uncontested		
Conservative hold		Swing		

==== November 1878 ====
1878
Party	Candidate	Votes	%	±%
Liberal	D. Greenwood*	uncontested		
Liberal hold		Swing		

==== November 1879 ====
1879
Party	Candidate	Votes	%	±%
Liberal	A. Evans*	uncontested		
Liberal hold		Swing		

=== Elections in 1880s ===
==== November 1880 ====
1880
Party	Candidate	Votes	%	±%
Conservative	J. Craven*	uncontested		
Conservative hold		Swing		

==== November 1881 ====
1881
Party	Candidate	Votes	%	±%
Liberal	D. Greenwood*	1,208	50.7	N/A
Conservative	W. Deakin	1,175	49.3	N/A
Majority		33	1.4	N/A
Turnout		2,383		
Liberal hold		Swing		

==== November 1882 ====
1882
Party	Candidate	Votes	%	±%
Liberal	A. Evans*	uncontested		
Liberal hold		Swing		

==== November 1883 ====
1883
Party	Candidate	Votes	%	±%
Conservative	J. Craven*	uncontested		
Conservative hold		Swing		

==== November 1884 ====
1884
Party	Candidate	Votes	%	±%
Conservative	W. Deakin	1,636	58.9	N/A
Liberal	D. Greenwood*	1,141	41.1	N/A
Majority		495	17.8	N/A
Turnout		2,777		
Conservative gain from Liberal		Swing		

==== November 1885 ====
1885
Party	Candidate	Votes	%	±%
Liberal	A. Evans*	uncontested		
Liberal hold		Swing		

==== May 1886 (by-election) ====
By-election: 19 May 1886
Party	Candidate	Votes	%	±%
Conservative	H. H. Mainwaring	1,160	53.3	N/A
Liberal	S. C. Richardson	1,015	46.7	N/A
Majority		145	6.6	N/A
Turnout		2,175		
Conservative hold		Swing		

==== November 1886 ====
1886
Party	Candidate	Votes	%	±%
Conservative	H. H. Mainwaring*	1,782	56.8	N/A
Liberal	S. C. Richardson	1,356	43.2	N/A
Majority		426	13.6	N/A
Turnout		3,138		
Conservative hold		Swing		

==== October 1887 (by-election) ====
By-election: 18 October 1887
Party	Candidate	Votes	%	±%
Liberal	W. T. Bax	854	65.2	+22.0
Independent Liberal	J. Jenkins	456	34.8	N/A
Majority		398	30.4	
Turnout		1,310		
Liberal hold		Swing		

==== November 1887 ====
1887
Party	Candidate	Votes	%	±%
Conservative	H. Cardwell	1,746	62.0	+5.2
Liberal	S. Woolford	1,071	38.0	−5.2
Majority		675	24.0	+10.4
Turnout		2,817		
Conservative hold		Swing		

==== November 1888 ====
1888
Party	Candidate	Votes	%	±%
Liberal	W. T. Bax*	uncontested		
Liberal hold		Swing		

==== November 1889 ====
1889
Party	Candidate	Votes	%	±%
Conservative	H. H. Mainwaring*	1,949	55.3	N/A
Liberal	T. Swindells	1,577	44.7	N/A
Majority		372	10.6	N/A
Turnout		3,526		
Conservative hold		Swing		

=== Elections in 1890s ===
==== November 1890 ====
1890
Party	Candidate	Votes	%	±%
Conservative	H. Cardwell*	uncontested		
Conservative hold		Swing		

==== November 1891 ====
1891
Party	Candidate	Votes	%	±%
Liberal	W. T. Bax*	uncontested		
Liberal hold		Swing		

==== November 1892 ====
1892
Party	Candidate	Votes	%	±%
Conservative	H. H. Mainwaring*	1,824	70.8	N/A
Palace of Varieties	E. Jones	753	29.2	N/A
Majority		1,071	41.6	N/A
Turnout		2,577		
Conservative hold		Swing		

==== November 1893 ====
1893
Party	Candidate	Votes	%	±%
Conservative	H. Cardwell*	1,679	60.8	−10.0
Ind. Labour Party	J. Lee	1,081	39.2	N/A
Majority		598	21.6	−20.0
Turnout		2,760		
Conservative hold		Swing		

==== November 1894 ====
1894
Party	Candidate	Votes	%	±%
Liberal	W. T. Bax*	1,782	65.0	N/A
Ind. Labour Party	J. Lee	959	35.0	−4.2
Majority		823	30.0	
Turnout		2,741		
Liberal hold		Swing		

==== November 1894 (by-election) ====
By-election: 16 November 1894
Party	Candidate	Votes	%	±%
Liberal Unionist	N. Bradley	1,644	59.5	N/A
Ind. Labour Party	J. Lee	1,121	40.5	+5.5
Majority		523	19.0	
Turnout		2,765		
Liberal Unionist gain from Conservative		Swing		

==== November 1895 ====
1895
Party	Candidate	Votes	%	±%
Conservative	H. H. Mainwaring*	1,808	77.0	N/A
Ind. Labour Party	F. Lawler	541	23.0	−12.0
Majority		1,267	54.0	
Turnout		2,349		
Conservative hold		Swing		

==== November 1896 ====
1896
Party	Candidate	Votes	%	±%
Liberal Unionist	N. Bradley*	1,306	56.9	N/A
Ind. Labour Party	J. Johnston	991	43.1	+20.1
Majority		315	13.8	
Turnout		2,297		
Liberal Unionist hold		Swing		

==== November 1897 ====
1897
Party	Candidate	Votes	%	±%
Liberal	W. T. Bax*	uncontested		
Liberal hold		Swing		

==== May 1898 (by-election) ====
By-election: 28 May 1898
Party	Candidate	Votes	%	±%
Conservative	W. H. Hesketh	1,538	62.7	N/A
Liberal	I. Pearson	915	37.3	N/A
Majority		623	25.4	N/A
Turnout		2,453		
Conservative hold		Swing		

==== November 1898 ====
1898
Party	Candidate	Votes	%	±%
Conservative	W. H. Hesketh*	uncontested		
Conservative hold		Swing		

==== February 1899 (by-election) ====
By-election: 27 February 1899
Party	Candidate	Votes	%	±%
Conservative	W. Kemp	1,510	56.8	N/A
Liberal	J. D. Pennington	1,148	43.2	N/A
Majority		362	13.6	N/A
Turnout		2,658		
Conservative gain from Liberal		Swing		

==== November 1899 ====
1899
Party	Candidate	Votes	%	±%
Liberal	J. D. Pennington	1,517	59.5	N/A
Conservative	J. Fielding	1,034	40.5	N/A
Majority		483	19.0	N/A
Turnout		2,551		
Liberal gain from Liberal Unionist		Swing		

=== Elections in 1900s ===
==== November 1900 ====
1900
Party	Candidate	Votes	%	±%
Conservative	W. Kemp*	1,706	56.8	+16.3
Liberal	R. Carhart	1,299	43.2	−16.3
Majority		407	13.6	
Turnout		3,005		
Conservative hold		Swing		

==== November 1901 ====
1901
Party	Candidate	Votes	%	±%
Conservative	W. H. Hesketh*	uncontested		
Conservative hold		Swing		

==== November 1901 (by-election) ====
By-election: 25 November 1901
Party	Candidate	Votes	%	±%
Conservative	A. W. Chapman	1,495	53.5	N/A
Liberal	R. Carhart	1,301	46.5	N/A
Majority		194	7.0	N/A
Turnout		2,796		
Conservative hold		Swing		

==== November 1902 ====
1902
Party	Candidate	Votes	%	±%
Liberal	J. D. Pennington*	1,558	51.2	N/A
Conservative	W. B. Broadhead	1,483	48.8	N/A
Majority		75	2.4	N/A
Turnout		3,041		
Liberal hold		Swing		

==== November 1903 ====
1903
Party	Candidate	Votes	%	±%
Conservative	A. W. Chapman*	1,610	59.0	+10.2
Liberal	G. Macfarlane	1,119	41.0	−10.2
Majority		491	18.0	
Turnout		2,729		
Conservative hold		Swing		

==== November 1904 ====
1904
Party	Candidate	Votes	%	±%
Conservative	H. White	1,351	53.1	−5.9
Liberal	G. Jennison	1,195	46.9	+5.9
Majority		156	6.2	−11.8
Turnout		2,546		
Conservative hold		Swing		

==== November 1905 ====
1905
Party	Candidate	Votes	%	±%
Liberal	J. D. Pennington*	1,345	51.1	+4.2
Conservative	J. H. Swales	1,287	48.9	−4.2
Majority		58	2.2	
Turnout		2,632		
Liberal hold		Swing		

==== November 1906 ====
1906
Party	Candidate	Votes	%	±%
Conservative	A. W. Chapman*	1,975	87.7	+38.8
Liberal	P. Cohen	277	12.3	−38.8
Majority		1,698	75.4	
Turnout		2,252		
Conservative hold		Swing		

==== November 1907 ====
1907
Party	Candidate	Votes	%	±%
Conservative	H. White*	uncontested		
Conservative hold		Swing		

==== November 1908 ====
1908
Party	Candidate	Votes	%	±%
Conservative	S. Woollam	1,254	46.6	N/A
Independent	J. D. Pennington*	761	28.3	N/A
Labour	J. D. Jubb	675	25.1	N/A
Majority		493	18.3	N/A
Turnout		2,690		
Conservative gain from Independent		Swing		

==== November 1909 ====
1909
Party	Candidate	Votes	%	±%
Conservative	A. W. Chapman*	1,476	60.8	+14.2
Labour	F. Lowe	951	39.2	+14.1
Majority		525	21.6	+3.3
Turnout		2,427		
Conservative hold		Swing		

=== Elections in 1910s ===
==== November 1910 ====
1910
Party	Candidate	Votes	%	±%
Conservative	W. G. Lecomber	1,526	59.2	−1.6
Liberal	K. T. S. Dockray	954	37.0	N/A
Independent	J. Kernahan	96	3.8	N/A
Majority		572	22.2	+0.6
Turnout		2,576		
Conservative hold		Swing		

==== November 1911 ====
1911
Party	Candidate	Votes	%	±%
Conservative	S. Woollam*	1,558	59.1	−0.1
Liberal	K. T. S. Dockray	1,080	40.9	+3.9
Majority		478	18.2	−4.0
Turnout		2,638		
Conservative hold		Swing		

==== November 1912 ====
1912
Party	Candidate	Votes	%	±%
Conservative	A. W. Chapman*	uncontested		
Conservative hold		Swing		

==== November 1913 ====
1913
Party	Candidate	Votes	%	±%
Conservative	W. J. Pine	1,726	60.1	N/A
Liberal	J. H. Dawson	1,148	39.9	N/A
Majority		578	20.2	N/A
Turnout		2,874		
Conservative hold		Swing		

==== November 1914 ====
1914
Party	Candidate	Votes	%	±%
Conservative	S. Woollam*	uncontested		
Conservative hold		Swing		

==== November 1919 ====
1919 (new boundaries)
Party	Candidate	Votes	%	±%
Conservative	C. H. S. Redmond	2,130	61.9	
Labour	C. Beamand	1,310	38.1	
Majority		820	23.8	
Turnout		3,440	30.5	
Conservative hold		Swing		

=== Elections in 1920s ===
==== November 1920 ====
1920
Party	Candidate	Votes	%	±%
Conservative	W. J. Pine*	2,999	72.5	+10.6
Labour	A. E. Robinson	1,139	27.5	−10.6
Majority		1,860	45.0	+21.2
Turnout		4,138	36.6	+6.1
Conservative hold		Swing		

==== November 1921 ====
1921
Party	Candidate	Votes	%	±%
Conservative	S. Woollam*	4,090	68.8	−3.7
Liberal	F. H. Earley	1,654	27.8	N/A
Independent	M. Healey	205	3.4	N/A
Majority		2,436	41.0	−4.0
Turnout		5,949	51.1	+6.1
Conservative hold		Swing		

==== November 1922 ====
1922
Party	Candidate	Votes	%	±%
Conservative	C. H. S. Redmond*	uncontested		
Conservative hold		Swing		

==== November 1923 ====
1923
Party	Candidate	Votes	%	±%
Conservative	W. J. Pine*	2,459	85.6	N/A
Independent	A. R. Edwards	415	14.4	N/A
Majority		2,044	71.2	N/A
Turnout		2,874		
Conservative hold		Swing		

==== November 1924 ====
1924
Party	Candidate	Votes	%	±%
Conservative	S. Woollam*	4,247	69.5	−16.1
Labour	T. F. Regan	1,844	30.2	N/A
National Unemployed Workers' Movement	P. Keeley	24	0.4	N/A
Majority		2,403	39.3	−31.9
Turnout		6,115		
Conservative hold		Swing		

==== November 1925 ====
1925
Party	Candidate	Votes	%	±%
Conservative	C. H. S. Redmond*	3,181	58.0	−11.5
Labour	E. Chorlton	2,306	42.0	+11.8
Majority		875	16.0	−23.3
Turnout		5,487	44.7	
Conservative hold		Swing		

==== November 1925 (by-election) ====
By-election: 24 November 1925
Party	Candidate	Votes	%	±%
Conservative	S. H. Holden Wood	1,929	41.1	−16.9
Labour	E. Chorlton	1,876	40.0	−2.0
Liberal	W. E. Davies	851	18.1	N/A
Independent	N. E. Walker	37	0.8	N/A
Majority		53	1.1	−14.9
Turnout		4,693		
Conservative hold		Swing		

==== November 1926 ====
1926
Party	Candidate	Votes	%	±%
Labour	E. Chorlton	2,833	54.5	+12.5
Conservative	W. J. Pine*	1,792	34.5	−23.5
Liberal	J. A. Wood	550	10.6	N/A
Residents	J. Gillan	20	0.4	N/A
Majority		1,041	20.0	
Turnout		5,195	43.1	−1.6
Labour gain from Conservative		Swing		

==== November 1927 ====
1927
Party	Candidate	Votes	%	±%
Labour	E. L. Jones	3,209	63.3	+8.8
Conservative	S. Holden Wood*	1,809	35.7	+1.2
Independent	P. J. Brett	48	1.0	N/A
Majority		1,400	27.6	+7.6
Turnout		5,066	42.7	−0.4
Labour gain from Conservative		Swing		

==== November 1928 ====
1928
Party	Candidate	Votes	%	±%
Labour	F. K. Edwards	2,677	50.5	−12.8
Conservative	C. H. S. Redmond*	2,473	46.8	+11.1
Residents	A. R. Edwards	148	2.8	N/A
Majority		204	3.9	−23.7
Turnout		5,298	45.4	+2.7
Labour gain from Conservative		Swing		

==== November 1929 ====
1929
Party	Candidate	Votes	%	±%
Labour	E. Chorlton*	2,274	55.3	+4.8
Conservative	A. W. L. Smith	1,796	43.7	−3.1
Residents	A. R. Edwards	39	1.0	−1.8
Majority		478	11.6	+7.7
Turnout		4,109	32.1	−13.3
Labour hold		Swing		

=== Elections in 1930s ===
==== November 1930 ====
1930
Party	Candidate	Votes	%	±%
Labour	E. L. Jones*	2,152	55.4	+0.1
Conservative	A. Ireland	1,732	44.6	+0.9
Majority		420	10.8	−0.8
Turnout		3,884		
Labour hold		Swing		

==== November 1931 ====
1931
Party	Candidate	Votes	%	±%
Conservative	P. T. Barnes	3,008	63.5	+18.9
Labour	F. Edwards*	1,729	36.5	−18.9
Majority		1,279	27.0	
Turnout		4,737	37.6	
Conservative gain from Labour		Swing		

==== November 1932 ====
1932
Party	Candidate	Votes	%	±%
Labour	J. Gorman	2,132	49.7	+13.2
Conservative	C. A. Cave	1,941	45.2	−18.3
Communist	E. Billington	221	5.1	N/A
Majority		191	4.5	
Turnout		4,294		
Labour hold		Swing		

==== November 1933 ====
1933
Party	Candidate	Votes	%	±%
Labour	E. L. Jones*	2,749	61.9	+12.2
Conservative	C. A. Cave	1,690	38.1	−7.1
Majority		1,059	23.8	+19.3
Turnout		4,439		
Labour hold		Swing		

==== November 1934 ====
1934
Party	Candidate	Votes	%	±%
Conservative	P. T. Barnes*	1,623	50.9	+12.8
Labour	R. McKeon	1,565	49.1	−12.8
Majority		58	1.8	
Turnout		3,188		
Conservative hold		Swing		

==== November 1935 ====
1935
Party	Candidate	Votes	%	±%
Labour	J. Gorman*	1,625	50.2	+1.1
Conservative	H. Timperley	1,610	49.8	−1.1
Majority		15	0.4	
Turnout		3,235		
Labour hold		Swing		

==== November 1936 ====
1936
Party	Candidate	Votes	%	±%
Labour	E. L. Jones*	2,350	66.3	+16.1
Conservative	C. E. Goolden	1,197	33.7	−16.1
Majority		1,153	32.6	+32.2
Turnout		3,547		
Labour hold		Swing		

==== November 1937 ====
1937
Party	Candidate	Votes	%	±%
Labour	J. Owen	1,712	54.3	−12.0
Conservative	P. T. Barnes*	1,442	45.7	+12.0
Majority		270	8.6	−24.0
Turnout		3,154		
Labour gain from Conservative		Swing		

==== November 1938 ====
1938
Party	Candidate	Votes	%	±%
Labour	J. Gorman*	1,742	51.7	−2.6
Conservative	A. Lees	1,566	46.5	+0.8
Residents	A. Robinson	60	1.8	N/A
Majority		176	5.2	−3.4
Turnout		3,368		
Labour hold		Swing		

=== Elections in 1940s ===
==== November 1945 ====
1945
Party	Candidate	Votes	%	±%
Labour	A. Littlemore*	1,611	58.2	+6.5
Conservative	C. Brewster	991	34.6	−11.9
Residents	R. Frere	266	9.3	N/A
Majority		620	21.6	+16.4
Turnout		2,868		
Labour hold		Swing		

==== November 1946 ====
1946
Party	Candidate	Votes	%	±%
Labour	M. Conway	1,540	49.6	−8.6
Conservative	A. Lees	1,257	40.5	+5.9
Communist	L. C. Walker	178	5.7	N/A
Liberal	H. K. Dawson	127	4.1	N/A
Majority		283	9.1	−12.5
Turnout		3,102		
Labour gain from Communist		Swing		

==== November 1947 ====
1947
Party	Candidate	Votes	%	±%
Conservative	A. Lees	2,474	50.4	+9.9
Labour	A. Harvey*	2,218	45.2	−4.3
Communist	L. B. Johnson	160	3.3	−2.3
Independent	J. Gillespie	54	1.1	N/A
Majority		256	5.2	
Turnout		4,906		
Conservative gain from Labour		Swing		

==== May 1949 ====
1949
Party	Candidate	Votes	%	±%
Labour	A. Littlemore*	2,395	51.4	+6.2
Conservative	J. McGrath*	2,182	46.8	−3.6
Communist	G. Chandler	85	1.8	−1.5
Majority		213	4.6	
Turnout		4,662		
Labour hold		Swing		

== See also ==
- Manchester City Council
- Manchester City Council elections
