= John Foulkes Roberts =

English politician

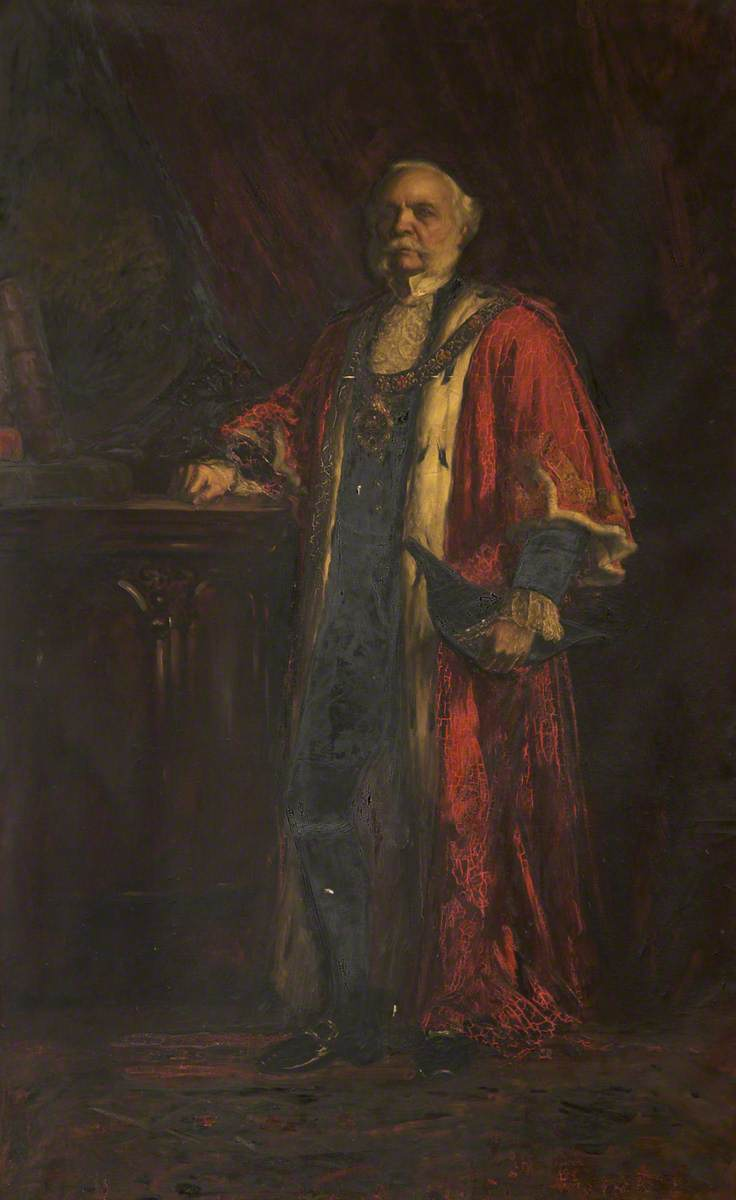

John Foulkes Roberts (1818–1902) was a civic leader in Manchester who served as Lord Mayor of Manchester from 1896 to 1897.

Roberts was a native of Anglesey. He was elected a councillor in the Manchester City Council in 1868, and an alderman in 1885. He served one term as Lord Mayor from 1896 to 1897, and then acted as deputy mayor the following year.

He took great interest in educational affairs in his native Wales, assisting by money and influence in the establishment in 1872 of Aberystwyth University College. He served as a founding member and later senior vice-president of the Court of Governors of the college. These initial years were crucial for the College, with no government help and always subject to attack from both North and South Wales. The fact that it survived was due mainly to the principal Thomas Charles Edwards and two supporters Roberts and Hugh Owens.

Roberts died in Manchester in November 1902.

A portrait of Roberts, painted by Thomas Edwin Mostyn, was unveiled in 1898 and hangs at Manchester Town Hall.

Political offices
Preceded by Abraham Evans Loyd	Lord Mayor of Manchester; 1896–1897	Succeeded by Robert Gibson
