= 1856 Manchester City Council election =

Local election in Manchester

- 1 November 1856

16 of 64 seats to Manchester City Council 33 seats needed for a majority

Elections to Manchester City Council were held on Saturday, 1 November 1856. One third of the councillors seats were up for election, with each successful candidate to serve a three-year term of office.

== Ward results ==
=== All Saints' ===
All Saints'
Party	Candidate	Votes	%	±%
Liberal	James Ryder*	uncontested		
Liberal gain from Conservative		Swing		

=== Ardwick ===
Ardwick
Party	Candidate	Votes	%	±%
Liberal	Robert Rumney*	uncontested		
Liberal hold		Swing		

=== Cheetham ===
Cheetham
Party	Candidate	Votes	%	±%
Liberal	James Bake*	393	52.5	N/A
Conservative	Edward Hardcastle	356	47.5	N/A
Majority		37	5.0	N/A
Turnout		749		
Liberal gain from		Swing		

=== Collegiate Church ===
Collegiate Church
Party	Candidate	Votes	%	±%
Liberal	Miles Craston*	466	50.9	−4.4
Conservative	Peter Royle	449	49.1	+4.4
Majority		17	1.8	−8.8
Turnout		915		
Liberal hold		Swing		

=== Exchange ===
Exchange
Party	Candidate	Votes	%	±%
Liberal	Ivie Mackie*	uncontested		
Liberal hold		Swing		

=== Medlock Street ===
Medlock Street
Party	Candidate	Votes	%	±%
Ratepayers	Abraham Dearden*	uncontested		
Ratepayers hold		Swing		

=== New Cross ===
New Cross
Party	Candidate	Votes	%	±%
Conservative	John Gibson*	uncontested		
Conservative	Thomas Lewis Williams*	uncontested		
Conservative hold		Swing		
Conservative hold		Swing		

=== Oxford ===
Oxford
Party	Candidate	Votes	%	±%
Liberal	John King*	uncontested		
Liberal hold		Swing		

=== St. Ann's ===
St. Ann's
Party	Candidate	Votes	%	±%
Conservative	William Gibb*	uncontested		
Conservative hold		Swing		

=== St. Clement's ===
St. Clement's
Party	Candidate	Votes	%	±%
Conservative	William Gibbon Newton*	237	61.2	N/A
Liberal	John Kirkham	150	38.8	N/A
Majority		87	22.4	N/A
Turnout		387		
Conservative hold		Swing		

=== St. George's ===
St. George's
Party	Candidate	Votes	%	±%
Conservative	John Haworth*	309	51.6	N/A
Liberal	George Pettinger	290	48.4	N/A
Majority		19	3.2	N/A
Turnout		599		
Conservative hold		Swing		

=== St. James' ===
St. James'
Party	Candidate	Votes	%	±%
Liberal	Thomas Goadsby*	uncontested		
Liberal hold		Swing		

=== St. John's ===
St. John's
Party	Candidate	Votes	%	±%
Conservative	William Bowker*	uncontested		
Conservative hold		Swing		

=== St. Luke's ===
St. Luke's
Party	Candidate	Votes	%	±%
	Gordon McConnell	uncontested		
	gain from Liberal	Swing		

=== St. Michael's ===
St. Michael's
Party	Candidate	Votes	%	±%
Conservative	William Henry Pratt	223	50.5	N/A
Liberal	Hugh Warburton*	219	49.5	N/A
Majority		4	1.0	N/A
Turnout		442		
Conservative gain from Liberal		Swing		
