= 1848 Manchester Borough Council election =

Local election in Manchester

- 1 November 1848

16 of 64 seats to Manchester Borough Council 33 seats needed for a majority

Elections to Manchester Borough Council were held on Wednesday, 1 November 1848. One third of the councillors seats were up for election, with each successful candidate to serve a three-year term of office.

== Ward results ==
=== All Saints' ===
All Saints'
Party	Candidate	Votes	%	±%
Liberal	Robert Barnes	270	51.9	N/A
	Thomas Brindle*	250	48.1	N/A
Majority		35	3.8	N/A
Turnout		520		
Liberal gain from		Swing		

=== Ardwick ===
Ardwick
Party	Candidate	Votes	%	±%
Liberal	James Thompson*	211	70.8	N/A
	Charles Ridings	87	29.2	N/A
Majority		124	41.6	N/A
Turnout		298		
Liberal hold		Swing		

=== Cheetham ===
Cheetham
Party	Candidate	Votes	%	±%
	Ralph Wareing	241	64.8	N/A
	William Milne	131	35.2	N/A
Majority		110	29.6	N/A
Turnout		372		
		Swing		

=== Collegiate Church ===
Collegiate Church
Party	Candidate	Votes	%	±%
Liberal	Matthew Thackray*	uncontested		
Liberal hold		Swing		

=== Exchange ===
Exchange
Party	Candidate	Votes	%	±%
Ratepayers	James Hibbert	205	54.6	+10.7
Conservative	Samuel Berry	170	45.3	N/A
Majority		35	9.4	
Turnout		375		
Ratepayers gain from Liberal		Swing		

=== Medlock Street ===
Medlock Street
Party	Candidate	Votes	%	±%
	Thomas Taylor	258	51.9	N/A
	William Duesbery	239	48.1	N/A
Majority		19	3.8	N/A
Turnout		497		
		Swing		

=== New Cross ===
New Cross
Party	Candidate	Votes	%	±%
Conservative	John Howard*	270	78.7	N/A
	John Middleton	245	71.4	
Chartist	William Willis	101	29.4	N/A
Chartist	James Mitchell	69	20.1	N/A
Majority		144	42.0	
Turnout		343		
Conservative hold		Swing		
		Swing		

=== Oxford ===
Oxford
Party	Candidate	Votes	%	±%
Liberal	Benjamin Fothergill	uncontested		
Liberal hold		Swing		

=== St. Ann's ===
St. Ann's
Party	Candidate	Votes	%	±%
Liberal	Samuel Fletcher	257	67.6	N/A
	Edward Bennett	108	28.4	N/A
	John Maskell	15	4.0	N/A
Majority		149	39.2	N/A
Turnout		380		
Liberal hold		Swing		

=== St. Clement's ===
St. Clement's
Party	Candidate	Votes	%	±%
Liberal	Benjamin Nicholls*	uncontested		
Liberal hold		Swing		

=== St. George's ===
St. George's
Party	Candidate	Votes	%	±%
Ratepayers	John Richardson White	219	57.9	N/A
Liberal	Edward Salmon Green	159	42.1	N/A
Majority		60	15.8	N/A
Turnout		378		
Ratepayers gain from Liberal		Swing		

=== St. James' ===
St. James'
Party	Candidate	Votes	%	±%
	James Watts	uncontested		
		Swing		

=== St. John's ===
St. John's
Party	Candidate	Votes	%	±%
	Joseph Nall	uncontested		
		Swing		

=== St. Luke's ===
St. Luke's
Party	Candidate	Votes	%	±%
Liberal	Walter Clark*	365	62.9	N/A
Conservative	Martin Middleton	215	37.1	N/A
Majority		150	25.8	N/A
Turnout		580		
Liberal hold		Swing		

=== St. Michael's ===
St. Michael's
Party	Candidate	Votes	%	±%
Conservative	Thomas Slater*	205	55.7	−13.0
Conservative	Holmes Milner	163	44.3	+13.0
Majority		42	37.4	−26.0
Turnout		368		
Conservative hold		Swing		
