= 1868 Manchester City Council election =

Local election in Manchester

- 2 November 1868

16 of 64 seats to Manchester City Council 33 seats needed for a majority

Elections to Manchester City Council were held on Monday, 2 November 1868. One third of the councillors seats were up for election, with each successful candidate to serve a three-year term of office.

== Ward results ==
=== All Saints' ===
All Saints'
Party	Candidate	Votes	%	±%
Conservative	Charles Cutting	uncontested		
Conservative gain from Liberal		Swing		

=== Ardwick ===
Ardwick
Party	Candidate	Votes	%	±%
Liberal	Joseph Thompson*	3	100.0	+45.6
	John Stordy	0	0.0	N/A
Majority		3	100.0	+91.2
Turnout				
Liberal hold		Swing		

=== Cheetham ===
Cheetham
Party	Candidate	Votes	%	±%
Liberal	John Ashton*	uncontested		
Liberal hold		Swing		

=== Collegiate Church ===
Collegiate Church
Party	Candidate	Votes	%	±%
Liberal	William Scott Brown	542	52.9	N/A
Conservative	George Anderton*	482	47.1	N/A
Majority		60	5.8	N/A
Turnout		1,024		
Liberal gain from Conservative		Swing		

=== Exchange ===
Exchange
Party	Candidate	Votes	%	±%
Liberal	George Booth*	uncontested		
Liberal hold		Swing		

=== Medlock Street ===
Medlock Street
Party	Candidate	Votes	%	±%
	William L. Galloway*	uncontested		
		Swing		

=== New Cross ===
New Cross
Party	Candidate	Votes	%	±%
Liberal	Walton Smith	416	58.9	+17.3
Liberal	Alexander Porter*	374	53.0	+11.4
Conservative	James Redfern	311	44.1	−17.7
Majority		63	8.9	
Turnout		706		
Liberal gain from Conservative		Swing		
Liberal hold		Swing		

=== Oxford ===
Oxford
Party	Candidate	Votes	%	±%
Conservative	Samuel Ingham*	232	72.5	N/A
Liberal	William Heywood	88	27.5	N/A
Majority		144	45.0	N/A
Turnout		320		
Conservative hold		Swing		

=== St. Ann's ===
St. Ann's
Party	Candidate	Votes	%	±%
Liberal	W. E. Hodgkinson	uncontested		
Liberal gain from Conservative		Swing		

=== St. Clement's ===
St. Clement's
Party	Candidate	Votes	%	±%
Conservative	John Townsend*	163	66.8	N/A
Liberal	James Robertson	81	33.2	N/A
Majority		82	33.6	N/A
Turnout		244		
Conservative hold		Swing		

=== St. George's ===
St. George's
Party	Candidate	Votes	%	±%
Liberal	William Mather*	uncontested		
Liberal hold		Swing		

=== St. James' ===
St. James'
Party	Candidate	Votes	%	±%
	George Whitehouse*	uncontested		
		Swing		

=== St. John's ===
St. John's
Party	Candidate	Votes	%	±%
Conservative	Matthew Brougham*	uncontested		
Conservative hold		Swing		

=== St. Luke's ===
St. Luke's
Party	Candidate	Votes	%	±%
Conservative	Jonas Eastwood*	uncontested		
Conservative hold		Swing		

=== St. Michael's ===
St. Michael's
Party	Candidate	Votes	%	±%
Liberal	Samuel Dyson*	uncontested		
Liberal hold		Swing		
