= 1854 Manchester City Council election =

Local election in Manchester

- 1 November 1854

16 of 64 seats to Manchester City Council 33 seats needed for a majority

Elections to Manchester City Council were held on Wednesday, 1 November 1854. One third of the councillors seats were up for election, with each successful candidate to serve a three-year term of office.

== Ward results ==
=== All Saints' ===
All Saints'
Party	Candidate	Votes	%	±%
	John Fildes*	uncontested		
		Swing		

=== Ardwick ===
Ardwick
Party	Candidate	Votes	%	±%
Conservative	John Marsland Bennett*	uncontested		
Conservative hold		Swing		

=== Cheetham ===
Cheetham
Party	Candidate	Votes	%	±%
	Nathaniel Card	uncontested		
		Swing		

=== Collegiate Church ===
Collegiate Church
Party	Candidate	Votes	%	±%
Liberal	Matthew Thackray*	uncontested		
Liberal hold		Swing		

=== Exchange ===
Exchange
Party	Candidate	Votes	%	±%
	James Woolley*	299	76.7	N/A
Independent	William Turnbull	91	23.3	N/A
Majority		208	53.4	N/A
Turnout		390		
		Swing		

=== Medlock Street ===
Medlock Street
Party	Candidate	Votes	%	±%
	Michael Angelo Bell*	uncontested		
	Robert Hadfield	no votes		
		Swing		

=== New Cross ===
New Cross
Party	Candidate	Votes	%	±%
Conservative	John Howard*	379	71.9	+14.8
Liberal	John Chadwick	280	53.1	+5.4
Conservative	Charles Clarke	256	48.5	−8.5
Majority		24	4.6	
Turnout		527		
Conservative hold		Swing		
Liberal gain from		Swing		

=== Oxford ===
Oxford
Party	Candidate	Votes	%	±%
	Thomas Beatt Sharp	uncontested		
	gain from Conservative	Swing		

=== St. Ann's ===
St. Ann's
Party	Candidate	Votes	%	±%
Liberal	Samuel Fletcher*	uncontested		
Liberal hold		Swing		

=== St. Clement's ===
St. Clement's
Party	Candidate	Votes	%	±%
Liberal	Benjamin Nicholls*	uncontested		
Liberal hold		Swing		

=== St. George's ===
St. George's
Party	Candidate	Votes	%	±%
	Thomas Dilworth Crewdson	uncontested		
		Swing		

=== St. James' ===
St. James'
Party	Candidate	Votes	%	±%
	James Watts*	uncontested		
		Swing		

=== St. John's ===
St. John's
Party	Candidate	Votes	%	±%
	Joseph Nall*	uncontested		
		Swing		

=== St. Luke's ===
St. Luke's
Party	Candidate	Votes	%	±%
Liberal	Walter Clark*	uncontested		
Liberal hold		Swing		

=== St. Michael's ===
St. Michael's
Party	Candidate	Votes	%	±%
Liberal	Thomas Worthington*	233	62.1	−1.4
Liberal	George Walker	142	37.9	+1.4
Majority		91	24.2	−2.8
Turnout		375		
Liberal hold		Swing		
