= 1865 Manchester City Council election =

Local election in Manchester

- 1 November 1865

16 of 64 seats to Manchester City Council 33 seats needed for a majority

Elections to Manchester City Council were held on Wednesday, 1 November 1865. One third of the councillors seats were up for election, with each successful candidate to serve a three-year term of office.

== Ward results ==
=== All Saints' ===
All Saints'
Party	Candidate	Votes	%	±%
Liberal	James Ryder*	uncontested		
Liberal hold		Swing		

=== Ardwick ===
Ardwick
Party	Candidate	Votes	%	±%
Liberal	Joseph Thompson	2	100.0	N/A
Liberal	John Hague Clegg*	0	0.0	N/A
Majority		2	100.0	N/A
Turnout		2		
Liberal gain from Liberal		Swing		

=== Cheetham ===
Cheetham
Party	Candidate	Votes	%	±%
Liberal	James Bake*	uncontested		
Liberal hold		Swing		

=== Collegiate Church ===
Collegiate Church
Party	Candidate	Votes	%	±%
Conservative	George Anderton*	uncontested		
	Joseph Sherlock	no votes		
Conservative hold		Swing		

=== Exchange ===
Exchange
Party	Candidate	Votes	%	±%
Liberal	George Booth*	326	59.2	N/A
	John Ashton	225	40.8	N/A
Majority		101	18.4	N/A
Turnout		551		
Liberal hold		Swing		

=== Medlock Street ===
Medlock Street
Party	Candidate	Votes	%	±%
Conservative	John Vertegans*	496	74.5	N/A
Liberal	George Pettinger	170	25.5	−33.5
Majority		326	49.0	
Turnout		666		
Conservative hold		Swing		

=== New Cross ===
New Cross
Party	Candidate	Votes	%	±%
Conservative	Charles Ashmore*	uncontested		
Conservative	Joseph Lamb*	uncontested		
Conservative hold		Swing		
Conservative hold		Swing		

=== Oxford ===
Oxford
Party	Candidate	Votes	%	±%
Liberal	John King*	uncontested		
Liberal hold		Swing		

=== St. Ann's ===
St. Ann's
Party	Candidate	Votes	%	±%
Conservative	William Slater	uncontested		
Conservative hold		Swing		

=== St. Clement's ===
St. Clement's
Party	Candidate	Votes	%	±%
Conservative	John Townsend*	uncontested		
Conservative hold		Swing		

=== St. George's ===
St. George's
Party	Candidate	Votes	%	±%
Conservative	William Booth*	uncontested		
Conservative hold		Swing		

=== St. James' ===
St. James'
Party	Candidate	Votes	%	±%
	George Whitehouse*	uncontested		
		Swing		

=== St. John's ===
St. John's
Party	Candidate	Votes	%	±%
Conservative	Matthew Brougham*	7	100.0	N/A
	Henry Fletcher	0	0.0	N/A
Majority		7	100.0	N/A
Turnout		7		
Conservative hold		Swing		

=== St. Luke's ===
St. Luke's
Party	Candidate	Votes	%	±%
Conservative	Jonas Eastwood*	uncontested		
Conservative hold		Swing		

=== St. Michael's ===
St. Michael's
Party	Candidate	Votes	%	±%
Liberal	Samuel Dyson	uncontested		
Liberal hold		Swing		
