= 1864 Manchester City Council election =

Local election in Manchester

- 1 November 1864

16 of 64 seats to Manchester City Council 33 seats needed for a majority

Elections to Manchester City Council were held on Tuesday, 1 November 1864. One third of the councillors seats were up for election, with each successful candidate to serve a three-year term of office.

== Ward results ==
=== All Saints' ===
All Saints'
Party	Candidate	Votes	%	±%
Conservative	Robert Whitwell Coates*	uncontested		
Conservative hold		Swing		

=== Ardwick ===
Ardwick
Party	Candidate	Votes	%	±%
Liberal	Adam Murray*	uncontested		
Liberal hold		Swing		

=== Cheetham ===
Cheetham
Party	Candidate	Votes	%	±%
Liberal	Harry Rawson*	uncontested		
Liberal hold		Swing		

=== Collegiate Church ===
Collegiate Church
Party	Candidate	Votes	%	±%
Liberal	Miles Craston*	182	78.8	+17.8
Conservative	Thomas Smith	48	20.8	N/A
Liberal	Josiah Taylor	1	0.4	−60.6
Majority		134	58.0	+36.0
Turnout		231		
Liberal hold		Swing		

=== Exchange ===
Exchange
Party	Candidate	Votes	%	±%
Conservative	James Neild	uncontested		
Conservative gain from Liberal		Swing		

=== Medlock Street ===
Medlock Street
Party	Candidate	Votes	%	±%
Liberal	John Marshall*	881	59.0	+11.2
Ratepayers	William Cottrell	611	41.0	N/A
Majority		270	18.0	
Turnout		1,492		
Liberal hold		Swing		

=== New Cross ===
New Cross
Party	Candidate	Votes	%	±%
Conservative	Thomas Greenwood*	425	78.0	N/A
Conservative	John Woodhouse	402	73.8	N/A
Liberal	Alfred Whitworth	131	24.0	N/A
Majority		271	49.8	N/A
Turnout		545		
Conservative hold		Swing		
Conservative hold		Swing		

=== Oxford ===
Oxford
Party	Candidate	Votes	%	±%
Liberal	Charles Thompson*	uncontested		
Liberal hold		Swing		

=== St. Ann's ===
St. Ann's
Party	Candidate	Votes	%	±%
	Francis Robinson	uncontested		
		Swing		

=== St. Clement's ===
St. Clement's
Party	Candidate	Votes	%	±%
Liberal	Edward Groome*	86	91.5	N/A
Conservative	William Wells*	8	8.5	N/A
Majority		78	83.0	N/A
Turnout		94		
Liberal hold		Swing		

=== St. George's ===
St. George's
Party	Candidate	Votes	%	±%
	Edward Heys	uncontested		
		Swing		

=== St. James' ===
St. James'
Party	Candidate	Votes	%	±%
Liberal	Alfred Watkin*	uncontested		
Liberal hold		Swing		

=== St. John's ===
St. John's
Party	Candidate	Votes	%	±%
Liberal	Jonathan Robert Hampson*	uncontested		
Liberal hold		Swing		

=== St. Luke's ===
St. Luke's
Party	Candidate	Votes	%	±%
Liberal	John Hopkinson*	uncontested		
Liberal hold		Swing		

=== St. Michael's ===
St. Michael's
Party	Candidate	Votes	%	±%
Liberal	William Arnold McGill*	353	74.3	N/A
Liberal	William Whitlam	122	25.7	N/A
Majority		231	48.6	N/A
Turnout		475		
Liberal hold		Swing		
