= 1862 Manchester City Council election =

Local election in Manchester

- 1 November 1862

16 of 64 seats to Manchester City Council 33 seats needed for a majority

Elections to Manchester City Council were held on Saturday, 1 November 1862. One third of the councillors seats were up for election, with each successful candidate to serve a three-year term of office.

== Ward results ==
=== All Saints' ===
All Saints'
Party	Candidate	Votes	%	±%
Liberal	James Ryder*	uncontested		
Liberal hold		Swing		

=== Ardwick ===
Ardwick
Party	Candidate	Votes	%	±%
Liberal	John Hague Clegg	538	55.3	−8.6
Conservative	Joseph Hardy*	434	44.7	+8.6
Majority		104	10.6	−17.2
Turnout		972		
Liberal gain from Conservative		Swing		

=== Cheetham ===
Cheetham
Party	Candidate	Votes	%	±%
Liberal	James Bake*	uncontested		
Liberal hold		Swing		

=== Collegiate Church ===
Collegiate Church
Party	Candidate	Votes	%	±%
Conservative	Holmes Milner	473	58.1	+31.1
Liberal	Josiah Taylor	341	41.9	−31.1
Majority		132	16.2	
Turnout		814		
Conservative gain from Liberal		Swing		

=== Exchange ===
Exchange
Party	Candidate	Votes	%	±%
Liberal	George Booth	uncontested		
Liberal gain from		Swing		

=== Medlock Street ===
Medlock Street
Party	Candidate	Votes	%	±%
Conservative	John Vertegans*	1,150	58.8	N/A
Liberal	Edward Salmon Green	806	41.2	−9.4
Majority		344	17.6	
Turnout		1,956		
Conservative hold		Swing		

=== New Cross ===
New Cross
Party	Candidate	Votes	%	±%
Conservative	Charles Ashmore*	332	62.8	−2.7
Conservative	Joseph Lamb	304	57.5	−8.0
Conservative	John Gibson*	211	39.9	−25.6
Majority		93	17.6	−3.4
Turnout		529		
Conservative hold		Swing		
Conservative gain from Conservative		Swing		

=== Oxford ===
Oxford
Party	Candidate	Votes	%	±%
Liberal	John King*	uncontested		
Liberal hold		Swing		

=== St. Ann's ===
St. Ann's
Party	Candidate	Votes	%	±%
Conservative	Frank Jewsbury	uncontested		
	George Falkner	no votes		
Conservative gain from		Swing		

=== St. Clement's ===
St. Clement's
Party	Candidate	Votes	%	±%
Conservative	John Townsend	214	54.9	N/A
Liberal	John Kirkham*	176	45.1	−13.0
Majority		38	9.8	
Turnout		390		
Conservative gain from Liberal		Swing		

=== St. George's ===
St. George's
Party	Candidate	Votes	%	±%
Conservative	William Booth*	uncontested		
Conservative hold		Swing		

=== St. James' ===
St. James'
Party	Candidate	Votes	%	±%
Liberal	Charles Sydney Grundy*	uncontested		
Liberal hold		Swing		

=== St. John's ===
St. John's
Party	Candidate	Votes	%	±%
Conservative	Matthew Brougham*	uncontested		
Conservative hold		Swing		

=== St. Luke's ===
St. Luke's
Party	Candidate	Votes	%	±%
	Gordon McConnell*	uncontested		
		Swing		

=== St. Michael's ===
St. Michael's
Party	Candidate	Votes	%	±%
Liberal	Hugh Warburton*	326	50.5	0
	John Armstrong	319	49.5	0
Majority		7	1.0	0
Turnout		645		
Liberal hold		Swing		
