= 1861 Manchester City Council election =

Local election in Manchester

- 1 November 1861

16 of 64 seats to Manchester City Council 33 seats needed for a majority

Elections to Manchester City Council were held on Friday, 1 November 1861. One third of the councillors seats were up for election, with each successful candidate to serve a three-year term of office.

== Ward results ==
=== All Saints' ===
All Saints'
Party	Candidate	Votes	%	±%
Conservative	Robert Whitwell Coates*	642	53.9	−3.5
Liberal	John Hague Clegg	550	46.1	+3.5
Majority		92	7.8	−7.0
Turnout		1,192		
Conservative hold		Swing		

=== Ardwick ===
Ardwick
Party	Candidate	Votes	%	±%
Liberal	Adam Murray	693	63.9	+12.1
Conservative	Frank Jewsbury	391	36.1	−12.1
Majority		302	27.8	+24.2
Turnout		1,084		
Liberal gain from Conservative		Swing		

=== Cheetham ===
Cheetham
Party	Candidate	Votes	%	±%
Liberal	Robert Neill*	uncontested		
Liberal hold		Swing		

=== Collegiate Church ===
Collegiate Church
Party	Candidate	Votes	%	±%
Liberal	Thomas Wilson Dyson*	322	73.0	+16.0
Conservative	George Anderton	119	27.0	−16.0
Majority		203	46.0	+32.0
Turnout		441		
Liberal hold		Swing		

=== Exchange ===
Exchange
Party	Candidate	Votes	%	±%
Liberal	Henry Ogden*	uncontested		
Liberal hold		Swing		

=== Medlock Street ===
Medlock Street
Party	Candidate	Votes	%	±%
Liberal	John Marshall	920	50.6	
Ratepayers	William Cottrell*	897	49.4	+7.9
Majority		23	1.2	
Turnout		1,817		
Liberal gain from Ratepayers		Swing		

=== New Cross ===
New Cross
Party	Candidate	Votes	%	±%
Conservative	Thomas Greenwood	364	65.5	+13.7
Conservative	William Wells	332	59.7	+7.9
Conservative	Joseph Lamb*	215	38.7	−13.1
Conservative	Peter Royle*	200	36.0	−15.8
Majority		117	21.0	+1.7
Turnout		556		
Conservative gain from Conservative		Swing		
Conservative gain from Conservative		Swing		

=== Oxford ===
Oxford
Party	Candidate	Votes	%	±%
Liberal	Charles Thompson*	uncontested		
Liberal gain from		Swing		

=== St. Ann's ===
St. Ann's
Party	Candidate	Votes	%	±%
	Francis Robinson*	uncontested		
		Swing		

=== St. Clement's ===
St. Clement's
Party	Candidate	Votes	%	±%
Liberal	Edward Groome*	207	58.1	N/A
Liberal	Thomas Greenhalgh	149	41.9	N/A
Majority		58	16.2	
Turnout		356		
Liberal hold		Swing		

=== St. George's ===
St. George's
Party	Candidate	Votes	%	±%
	Edwin Boden	302	85.1	
	John Heap	53	14.9	
Majority		249	70.2	
Turnout		355		
	gain from Liberal	Swing		

=== St. James' ===
St. James'
Party	Candidate	Votes	%	±%
Liberal	Alfred Watkin*	uncontested		
Liberal hold		Swing		

=== St. John's ===
St. John's
Party	Candidate	Votes	%	±%
Liberal	Jonathan Robert Hampson	218	71.2	
	John Heywood*	88	28.8	
Majority		130	42.4	
Turnout		306		
Liberal gain from		Swing		

=== St. Luke's ===
St. Luke's
Party	Candidate	Votes	%	±%
Liberal	John Hopkinson	uncontested		
Liberal hold		Swing		

=== St. Michael's ===
St. Michael's
Party	Candidate	Votes	%	±%
Liberal	William Arnold McGill*	276	50.5	N/A
	John Armstrong	271	49.5	+42.4
Majority		5	1.0	
Turnout		547		
Liberal hold		Swing		
