= 1851 Manchester Borough Council election =

Local election in Manchester

- 1 November 1851

16 of 64 seats to Manchester Borough Council 33 seats needed for a majority

Elections to Manchester Borough Council were held on Saturday, 1 November 1851. One third of the councillors seats were up for election, with each successful candidate to serve a three-year term of office.

== Ward results ==
=== All Saints' ===
All Saints'
Party	Candidate	Votes	%	±%
Liberal	Robert Barnes*	uncontested		
Liberal hold		Swing		

=== Ardwick ===
Ardwick
Party	Candidate	Votes	%	±%
Conservative	John Marsland Bennett	uncontested		
Conservative gain from Liberal		Swing		

=== Cheetham ===
Cheetham
Party	Candidate	Votes	%	±%
	Philip Lucas	uncontested		
		Swing		

=== Collegiate Church ===
Collegiate Church
Party	Candidate	Votes	%	±%
Liberal	Matthew Thackray*	uncontested		
Liberal hold		Swing		

=== Exchange ===
Exchange
Party	Candidate	Votes	%	±%
	James Woolley	uncontested		
	gain from Ratepayers	Swing		

=== Medlock Street ===
Medlock Street
Party	Candidate	Votes	%	±%
	Michael Angelo Bell	375	56.9	
	Thomas Redfern	284	43.1	
Majority		91	13.8	
Turnout		659		
		Swing		

=== New Cross ===
New Cross
Party	Candidate	Votes	%	±%
Conservative	John Howard*	uncontested		
	Hugh Shaw	uncontested		
Conservative hold		Swing		
		Swing		

=== Oxford ===
Oxford
Party	Candidate	Votes	%	±%
Conservative	Matthew Brougham	uncontested		
Conservative gain from Liberal		Swing		

=== St. Ann's ===
St. Ann's
Party	Candidate	Votes	%	±%
Liberal	Samuel Fletcher*	uncontested		
Liberal hold		Swing		

=== St. Clement's ===
St. Clement's
Party	Candidate	Votes	%	±%
Liberal	Benjamin Nicholls*	uncontested		
Liberal hold		Swing		

=== St. George's ===
St. George's
Party	Candidate	Votes	%	±%
	Thomas Greig	281	55.4	N/A
	W. D. Fullalove	226	44.6	N/A
Majority		55	10.8	N/A
Turnout		507		
		Swing		

=== St. James' ===
St. James'
Party	Candidate	Votes	%	±%
	James Watts*	uncontested		
		Swing		

=== St. John's ===
St. John's
Party	Candidate	Votes	%	±%
	Joseph Nall*	uncontested		
		Swing		

=== St. Luke's ===
St. Luke's
Party	Candidate	Votes	%	±%
Liberal	Walter Clark*	uncontested		
Liberal hold		Swing		

=== St. Michael's ===
St. Michael's
Party	Candidate	Votes	%	±%
Liberal	Thomas Worthington*	uncontested		
Liberal hold		Swing		
