= 1867 Manchester City Council election =

Local election in Manchester

- 1 November 1867

16 of 64 seats to Manchester City Council 33 seats needed for a majority

Elections to Manchester City Council were held on Friday, 1 November 1867. One third of the councillors seats were up for election, with each successful candidate to serve a three-year term of office.

== Ward results ==
=== All Saints' ===
All Saints'
Party	Candidate	Votes	%	±%
Liberal	Thomas Greenhalgh*	uncontested		
Liberal hold		Swing		

=== Ardwick ===
Ardwick
Party	Candidate	Votes	%	±%
Liberal	Adam Murray*	531	54.4	N/A
Conservative	S. P. Bidder	445	45.6	N/A
Majority		86	8.8	N/A
Turnout		976		
Liberal hold		Swing		

=== Cheetham ===
Cheetham
Party	Candidate	Votes	%	±%
	Thomas Swanwick*	uncontested		
		Swing		

=== Collegiate Church ===
Collegiate Church
Party	Candidate	Votes	%	±%
Liberal	Thomas Muirhead	uncontested		
Liberal hold		Swing		

=== Exchange ===
Exchange
Party	Candidate	Votes	%	±%
Conservative	James Neild*	335	51.5	N/A
Liberal	Thomas Humphreys	315	48.5	N/A
Majority		20	3.0	N/A
Turnout		650		
Conservative hold		Swing		

=== Medlock Street ===
Medlock Street
Party	Candidate	Votes	%	±%
Liberal	T. B. Waters	830	56.2	N/A
Liberal	John Marshall*	648	43.8	N/A
Majority		182	12.4	N/A
Turnout		1,478		
Liberal gain from Liberal		Swing		

=== New Cross ===
New Cross
Party	Candidate	Votes	%	±%
Conservative	Thomas Greenwood*	361	61.8	N/A
Conservative	John Woodhouse*	326	55.8	N/A
Liberal	Alexander Fairweather	243	41.6	N/A
Liberal	R. D. Rusden	236	40.4	N/A
Majority		83	14.2	N/A
Turnout		584		
Conservative hold		Swing		
Conservative hold		Swing		

=== Oxford ===
Oxford
Party	Candidate	Votes	%	±%
Liberal	Charles Thompson*	uncontested		
Liberal hold		Swing		

=== St. Ann's ===
St. Ann's
Party	Candidate	Votes	%	±%
Liberal	Frederick Cooper	uncontested		
Liberal gain from		Swing		

=== St. Clement's ===
St. Clement's
Party	Candidate	Votes	%	±%
Liberal	Edward Groome*	uncontested		
Liberal hold		Swing		

=== St. George's ===
St. George's
Party	Candidate	Votes	%	±%
Liberal	James Derbyshire	uncontested		
Liberal gain from		Swing		

=== St. James' ===
St. James'
Party	Candidate	Votes	%	±%
Liberal	Alfred Watkin*	uncontested		
Liberal hold		Swing		

=== St. John's ===
St. John's
Party	Candidate	Votes	%	±%
Liberal	Jonathan Robert Hampson*	uncontested		
Liberal hold		Swing		

=== St. Luke's ===
St. Luke's
Party	Candidate	Votes	%	±%
Liberal	John Hopkinson*	uncontested		
Liberal hold		Swing		

=== St. Michael's ===
St. Michael's
Party	Candidate	Votes	%	±%
Conservative	Greenwood Craven	313	60.2	+7.4
Liberal	Hugh Warburton	207	39.8	−7.4
Majority		106	20.4	+14.8
Turnout		520		
Conservative gain from Liberal		Swing		
