= 1880 Manchester City Council election =

Local election in Manchester

- 1 November 1880

16 of 64 seats to Manchester City Council 33 seats needed for a majority
	First party	Second party
Party	Liberal	Conservative
Last election	12 seats, 52.1%	4 seats, 47.9%
Seats before	43	21
Seats won	9	7
Seats after	43	21
Seat change	Steady	Steady
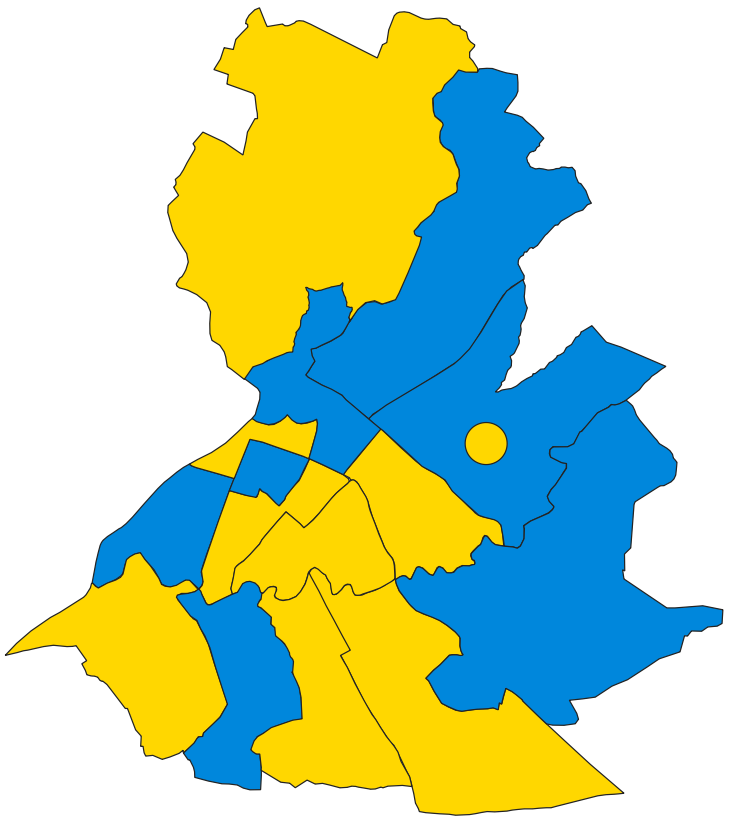
- Map of results of 1880 election
Leader of the Council before election
Liberal
Leader of the Council after election
Liberal

Elections to Manchester City Council took place on Monday, 1 November 1880. One third of the councillors seats were up for election, with each successful candidate to serve a three-year term of office.

None of the seats were contested, and all retiring councillors were returned unopposed. The Liberal Party retained overall control of the council.

== Election result ==
Party	Seats			Full Council	
Liberal Party	9 (56.3%)	9 / 16	Steady	43 (67.2%)	43 / 64
Conservative Party	7 (43.7%)	7 / 16	Steady	21 (32.8%)	21 / 64

=== Full council ===
↓
43	21

=== Aldermen ===
↓
12	4

=== Councillors ===
↓
31	17

== Ward results ==
=== All Saints' ===
All Saints'
Party	Candidate	Votes	%	±%
Liberal	J. Little*	uncontested		
Liberal hold		Swing		

=== Ardwick ===
Ardwick
Party	Candidate	Votes	%	±%
Conservative	S. Chesters Thompson*	uncontested		
Conservative hold		Swing		

=== Cheetham ===
Cheetham
Party	Candidate	Votes	%	±%
Liberal	J. Ashton*	uncontested		
Liberal hold		Swing		

=== Collegiate Church ===
Collegiate Church
Party	Candidate	Votes	%	±%
Conservative	W. Griffin*	uncontested		
Conservative hold		Swing		

=== Exchange ===
Exchange
Party	Candidate	Votes	%	±%
Liberal	J. Milling*	uncontested		
Liberal hold		Swing		

=== Medlock Street ===
Medlock Street
Party	Candidate	Votes	%	±%
Conservative	J. Craven*	uncontested		
Conservative hold		Swing		

=== New Cross ===
New Cross
Party	Candidate	Votes	%	±%
Conservative	H. Shaw*	uncontested		
Liberal	W. Smith*	uncontested		
Conservative hold		Swing		
Liberal hold		Swing		

=== Oxford ===
Oxford
Party	Candidate	Votes	%	±%
Liberal	B. T. Leech	uncontested		
Liberal hold		Swing		

=== St. Ann's ===
St. Ann's
Party	Candidate	Votes	%	±%
Conservative	J. A. Birch*	uncontested		
Conservative hold		Swing		

=== St. Clement's ===
St. Clement's
Party	Candidate	Votes	%	±%
Liberal	J. W. Southern*	uncontested		
Liberal hold		Swing		

=== St. George's ===
St. George's
Party	Candidate	Votes	%	±%
Liberal	R. B. Goldsworthy*	uncontested		
Liberal hold		Swing		

=== St. James' ===
St. James'
Party	Candidate	Votes	%	±%
Liberal	A. E. Lloyd	uncontested		
Liberal hold		Swing		

=== St. John's ===
St. John's
Party	Candidate	Votes	%	±%
Conservative	W. Robinson*	uncontested		
Conservative hold		Swing		

=== St. Luke's ===
St. Luke's
Party	Candidate	Votes	%	±%
Liberal	W. Scott Brown*	uncontested		
Liberal hold		Swing		

=== St. Michael's ===
St. Michael's
Party	Candidate	Votes	%	±%
Conservative	G. Moulton*	uncontested		
Conservative hold		Swing		
