= 1887 Manchester City Council election =

Local election in Manchester

- 1 November 1887

19 of 76 seats to Manchester City Council 39 seats needed for a majority
	First party	Second party	Third party
Party	Liberal	Conservative	Liberal Unionist
Last election	9 seats, 48.0%	9 seats, 50.6%	1 seats, 0.0%
Seats before	32	34	10
Seats won	9	9	1
Seats after	33	33	10
Seat change	▲1	▼1	Steady
Popular vote	12,733	12,405	0
Percentage	50.7%	49.3%	0.0%
Swing	▲2.7%	▼1.3%	Steady
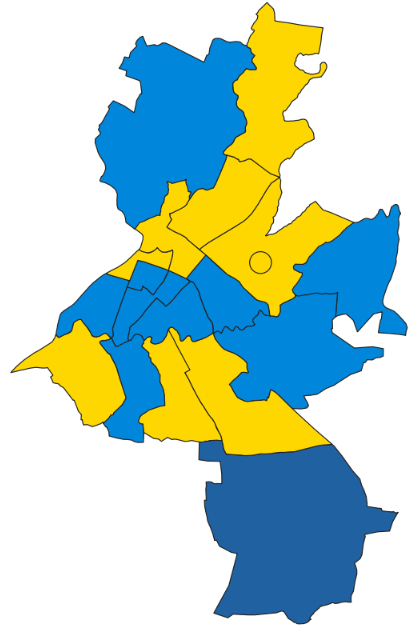
- Map of results of 1887 election
Leader of the Council before election
No overall control
Leader of the Council after election
No overall control

Elections to Manchester City Council were held on Tuesday, 1 November 1887. One third of the councillors seats were up for election, with each successful candidate to serve a three-year term of office. The council remained under no overall control.

== Election result ==
Party	Votes		Seats			Full Council	
Liberal Party	12,733 (50.7%)	▲2.7	9 (47.4%)	9 / 19	▲1	33 (43.4%)	33 / 76
Conservative Party	12,405 (49.3%)	▼1.3	9 (47.4%)	9 / 19	▼1	33 (43.4%)	33 / 76
Liberal Unionist	0 (0.0%)	Steady	1 (5.3%)	1 / 19	Steady	10 (13.2%)	10 / 76

=== Full council ===
↓
33	10	33

=== Aldermen ===
↓
10	3	6

=== Councillors ===
↓
23	7	27

== Ward results ==
=== All Saints' ===
All Saints'
Party	Candidate	Votes	%	±%
Liberal	A. McDougall*	uncontested		
Liberal hold		Swing		

=== Ardwick ===
Ardwick
Party	Candidate	Votes	%	±%
Conservative	E. Tatton	2,065	57.7	N/A
Liberal	J. H. Crosfield*	1,516	42.3	N/A
Majority		549	15.4	N/A
Turnout		3,581		
Conservative gain from Liberal		Swing		

=== Bradford ===
Bradford
Party	Candidate	Votes	%	±%
Conservative	J. Tunstall*	uncontested		
Conservative hold		Swing		

=== Cheetham ===
Cheetham
Party	Candidate	Votes	%	±%
Conservative	H. Boddington*	uncontested		
Conservative hold		Swing		

=== Collegiate Church ===
Collegiate Church
Party	Candidate	Votes	%	±%
Liberal	R. Affleck	683	53.4	+0.5
Conservative	D. Reid	597	46.6	−0.5
Majority		86	6.8	+1.0
Turnout		1,280		
Liberal hold		Swing		

=== Exchange ===
Exchange
Party	Candidate	Votes	%	±%
Liberal	S. B. Worthington	409	53.5	N/A
Conservative	J. Kay	355	46.5	N/A
Majority		54	7.0	N/A
Turnout		764		
Liberal hold		Swing		

=== Harpurhey ===
Harpurhey
Party	Candidate	Votes	%	±%
Liberal	W. Sherratt*	2,032	54.2	+13.9
Conservative	R. Smith	1,716	45.8	−13.9
Majority		316	8.4	
Turnout		3,748		
Liberal hold		Swing		

=== Medlock Street ===
Medlock Street
Party	Candidate	Votes	%	±%
Conservative	H. Cardwell	1,746	62.0	+5.2
Liberal	S. Woolford	1,071	38.0	−5.2
Majority		675	24.0	+10.4
Turnout		2,817		
Conservative hold		Swing		

=== New Cross ===
New Cross
Party	Candidate	Votes	%	±%
Liberal	H. Aldred	2,695	54.6	+3.0
Liberal	J. B. Fullerton	2,582	52.3	+0.7
Conservative	S. Redfern*	2,346	47.5	−1.9
Conservative	J. Swindells*	2,257	45.7	−3.7
Majority		236	4.8	+3.0
Turnout		4,940		
Liberal gain from Conservative		Swing		
Liberal gain from Conservative		Swing		

=== Oxford ===
Oxford
Party	Candidate	Votes	%	±%
Conservative	B. Gibbons*	uncontested		
Conservative hold		Swing		

=== Rusholme ===
Rusholme
Party	Candidate	Votes	%	±%
Liberal Unionist	W. T. Gunson*	uncontested		
Liberal Unionist hold		Swing		

=== St. Ann's ===
St. Ann's
Party	Candidate	Votes	%	±%
Conservative	A. G. Copeland*	uncontested		
Conservative hold		Swing		

=== St. Clement's ===
St. Clement's
Party	Candidate	Votes	%	±%
Conservative	C. Howarth	uncontested		
Conservative gain from Liberal		Swing		

=== St. George's ===
St. George's
Party	Candidate	Votes	%	±%
Liberal	R. Gibson*	uncontested		
Liberal hold		Swing		

=== St. James' ===
St. James'
Party	Candidate	Votes	%	±%
Conservative	W. T. Windsor*	uncontested		
Conservative hold		Swing		

=== St. John's ===
St. John's
Party	Candidate	Votes	%	±%
Conservative	J. H. Cuff*	uncontested		
Conservative hold		Swing		

=== St. Luke's ===
St. Luke's
Party	Candidate	Votes	%	±%
Liberal	J. W. Southern*	uncontested		
Liberal hold		Swing		

=== St. Michael's ===
St. Michael's
Party	Candidate	Votes	%	±%
Liberal	R. M. Newton	1,745	56.7	+8.6
Conservative	J. Faulkner*	1,333	43.3	−8.1
Majority		412	13.4	
Turnout		3,078		
Liberal gain from Conservative		Swing		

== Aldermanic elections ==
=== Aldermanic election, 1 August 1888 ===
Caused by the death on 22 July 1888 of Alderman George Moulton (Conservative, elected as an alderman by the council on 1 December 1886).

In his place, Councillor William Tessimond Windsor (Conservative, St. James', elected 28 December 1876) was elected as an alderman by the council on 1 August 1888.

Party	Alderman	Ward	Term expires
Conservative	William Tessimond Windsor		1889

== By-elections between 1887 and 1888 ==
=== St. James', 7 August 1888 ===
Caused by the election as an alderman of Councillor William Tessimond Windsor (Conservative, St. James', elected 28 December 1876) on 1 August 1888 following the death on 22 July 1888 of Alderman George Moulton (Conservative, elected as an alderman by the council on 1 December 1886).

St. James'
Party	Candidate	Votes	%	±%
Conservative	H. Samson	uncontested		
Conservative hold		Swing		
