= 1843 Manchester Borough Council election =

Local election in Manchester

- 1 November 1843

16 of 64 seats to Manchester Borough Council 33 seats needed for a majority
	First party
Party	Liberal
Last election	17 seats, 90.3%
Seats before	64
Seats won	16
Seats after	64
Seat change	Steady
Popular vote	558
Percentage	100.0%
Swing	▲9.7%
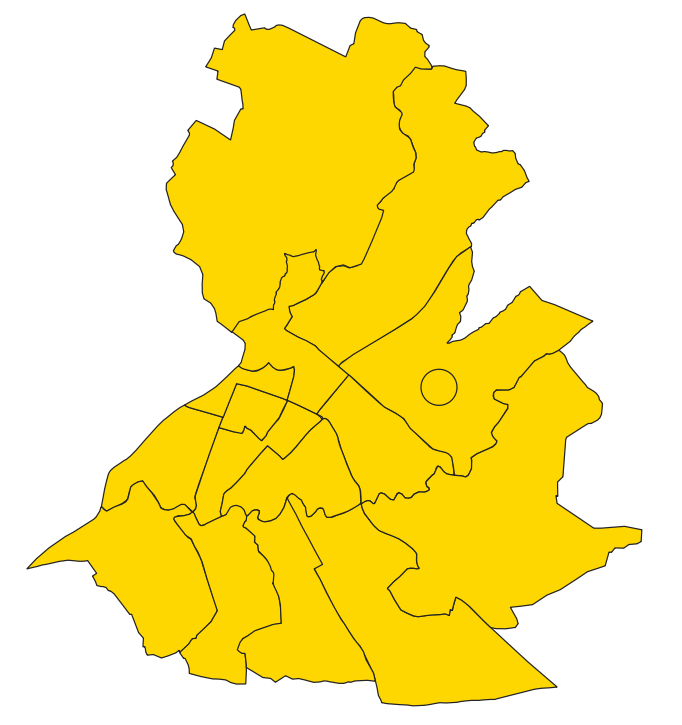
- Map of results of 1843 election
Leader of the Council before election
Liberal
Leader of the Council after election
Liberal

Elections to Manchester Borough Council were held on Wednesday, 1 November 1843. One third of the councillors seats were up for election, with each successful candidate to serve a three-year term of office. Conservative anti-corporators continued their boycott of municipal elections due to their opposition to Manchester's incorporation. Liberal incorporators retained overall control of the council.

In the wake of the election, the Conservative-leaning Manchester Courier, which had previously disputed the legitimacy of Manchester's Charter of Incorporation, published an editorial calling on the party to begin challenging the Liberals on Manchester Corporation.

== Election result ==
Party	Votes		Seats			Full Council	
Liberal Party	558 (100.0%)	▲9.7	16 (100.0%)	16 / 16	Steady	64 (100.0%)	64 / 64

=== Full council ===
↓
64

=== Aldermen ===
↓
16

=== Councillors ===
↓
48

== Ward results ==
=== All Saints' ===
All Saints'
Party	Candidate	Votes	%	±%
Liberal	Joshua Stockwell	uncontested		
Liberal hold		Swing		

=== Ardwick ===
Ardwick
Party	Candidate	Votes	%	±%
Liberal	Edmund Peel Thomson*	172	76.8	N/A
Liberal	John Marshall	52	23.2	N/A
Majority		120	53.6	N/A
Turnout		224		
Liberal hold		Swing		

=== Cheetham ===
Cheetham
Party	Candidate	Votes	%	±%
Liberal	James Bradford	104	62.7	N/A
Liberal	John Harrison*	62	37.3	−37.1
Majority		42	25.4	
Turnout		166		
Liberal gain from Liberal		Swing		

=== Collegiate Church ===
Collegiate Church
Party	Candidate	Votes	%	±%
Liberal	Abel Heywood	uncontested		
Liberal hold		Swing		

=== Exchange ===
Exchange
Party	Candidate	Votes	%	±%
Liberal	Samuel Satterthwaite*	uncontesed		
Liberal hold		Swing		

=== Medlock Street ===
Medlock Street
Party	Candidate	Votes	%	±%
Liberal	John Richardson White*	uncontested		
Liberal hold		Swing		

=== New Cross ===
New Cross
Party	Candidate	Votes	%	±%
Liberal	James Hampson*	uncontested		
Liberal	Archibald Prentice*	uncontested		
Liberal hold		Swing		
Liberal hold		Swing		

=== Oxford ===
Oxford
Party	Candidate	Votes	%	±%
Liberal	James Bake	86	51.2	−8.1
Liberal	George Macbeath	82	48.8	+8.1
Majority		4	2.4	
Turnout		168		
Liberal hold		Swing		

=== St. Ann's ===
St. Ann's
Party	Candidate	Votes	%	±%
Liberal	John Herford*	uncontested		
Liberal hold		Swing		

=== St. Clement's ===
St. Clement's
Party	Candidate	Votes	%	±%
Liberal	John Leigh Cooke	uncontested		
Liberal hold		Swing		

=== St. George's ===
St. George's
Party	Candidate	Votes	%	±%
Liberal	Thomas Malkin	uncontested		
Liberal hold		Swing		

=== St. James' ===
St. James'
Party	Candidate	Votes	%	±%
Liberal	Richard Moore*	uncontested		
Liberal hold		Swing		

=== St. John's ===
St. John's
Party	Candidate	Votes	%	±%
Liberal	George Brown*	uncontested		
Liberal hold		Swing		

=== St. Luke's ===
St. Luke's
Party	Candidate	Votes	%	±%
Liberal	Josepth Smith Grafton*	uncontested		
Liberal hold		Swing		

=== St. Michael's ===
St. Michael's
Party	Candidate	Votes	%	±%
Liberal	John Kirkham*	uncontested		
Liberal hold		Swing		
