= 1839 Manchester Borough Council election =

Local election in Manchester

- 1 November 1839

16 of 64 seats to Manchester Borough Council 33 seats needed for a majority
| | First party |
|---|---|
| Party | Liberal |
| Last election | 48 seats, 90.8% |
| Seats before | 64 |
| Seats won | 16 |
| Seats after | 64 |
| Seat change | Steady |
| Popular vote | 642 |
| Percentage | 54.5% |
| Swing | ▼36.3% |
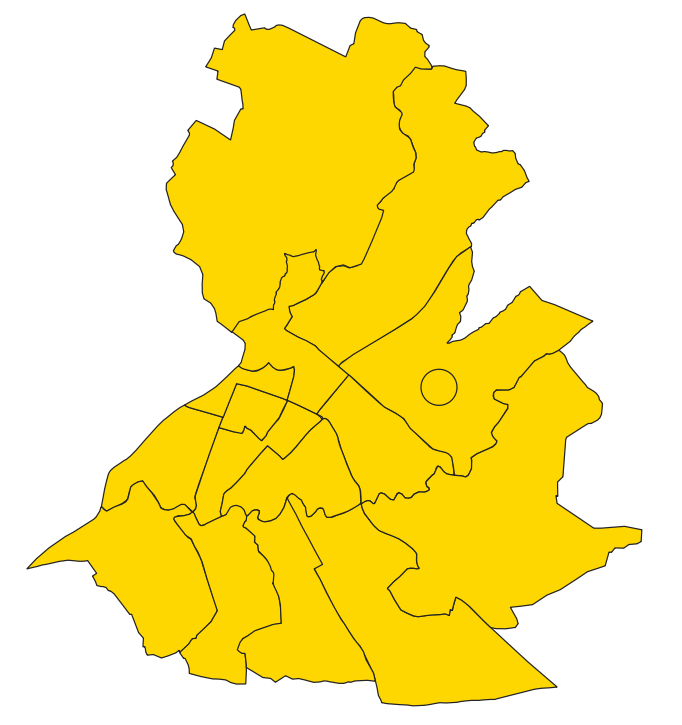
- Map of results of 1839 election
Leader of the Council before election
Liberal
Leader of the Council after election
Liberal

Elections to Manchester Borough Council were held on Friday, 1 November 1839. One third of the councillors seats were up for election, with each successful candidate to serve a three-year term of office. Conservative anti-corporators continued their boycott of municipal elections due to their opposition to Manchester's incorporation and only one of the fifteen wards was contested. Liberal incorporators retained overall control of the council.

== Election result ==
| Party | Votes | | Seats | | | Full Council | |
| Liberal | 642 (54.5%) | ▼36.3 | 16 (100.0%) | 16 / 16 | Steady | 64 (100.0%) | 64 / 64 |
| Radical | 536 (45.5%) | ▲36.3 | 0 (0.0%) | 0 / 16 | Steady | 0 (0.0%) | 0 / 64 |

=== Full council ===
↓
64

=== Aldermen ===
↓
16

=== Councillors ===
↓
48

== Ward results ==
=== All Saints' ===
All Saints'
| Party | Candidate | Votes | % | ±% |
|---|---|---|---|---|
| Liberal | Samuel Eveleigh* | uncontested | | |
| Liberal hold | | Swing | | |

=== Ardwick ===
Ardwick
| Party | Candidate | Votes | % | ±% |
|---|---|---|---|---|
| Liberal | Aaron Nodal* | uncontested | | |
| Liberal hold | | Swing | | |

=== Cheetham ===
Cheetham
| Party | Candidate | Votes | % | ±% |
|---|---|---|---|---|
| Liberal | George Heywood* | uncontested | | |
| Liberal hold | | Swing | | |

=== Collegiate Church ===
Collegiate Church
| Party | Candidate | Votes | % | ±% |
|---|---|---|---|---|
| Liberal | George Hargreaves Winder* | uncontested | | |
| Liberal hold | | Swing | | |

=== Exchange ===
Exchange
| Party | Candidate | Votes | % | ±% |
|---|---|---|---|---|
| Liberal | William Burd* | uncontesed | | |
| Liberal hold | | Swing | | |

=== Medlock Street ===
Medlock Street
| Party | Candidate | Votes | % | ±% |
|---|---|---|---|---|
| Liberal | John Naylor* | uncontested | | |
| Liberal hold | | Swing | | |

=== New Cross ===
New Cross
| Party | Candidate | Votes | % | ±% |
|---|---|---|---|---|
| Liberal | John Swindells* | 331 | 56.2 | −16.8 |
| Liberal | Archibald Prentice* | 311 | 52.8 | −20.2 |
| Radical | James Wroe | 270 | 45.8 | +2.0 |
| Radical | James Scholefield | 266 | 45.2 | +1.4 |
| Majority | | 41 | 7.0 | −8.5 |
| Turnout | | 589 | | |
| Liberal hold | | Swing | | |
| Liberal hold | | Swing | | |

=== Oxford ===
Oxford
| Party | Candidate | Votes | % | ±% |
|---|---|---|---|---|
| Liberal | Samuel Lowcock* | uncontested | | |
| Liberal hold | | Swing | | |

=== St. Ann's ===
St. Ann's
| Party | Candidate | Votes | % | ±% |
|---|---|---|---|---|
| Liberal | John Edward Taylor* | uncontested | | |
| Liberal hold | | Swing | | |

=== St. Clement's ===
St. Clement's
| Party | Candidate | Votes | % | ±% |
|---|---|---|---|---|
| Liberal | William Woodward* | uncontested | | |
| Liberal hold | | Swing | | |

=== St. George's ===
St. George's
| Party | Candidate | Votes | % | ±% |
|---|---|---|---|---|
| Liberal | William Nicholson* | uncontested | | |
| Liberal hold | | Swing | | |

=== St. James' ===
St. James'
| Party | Candidate | Votes | % | ±% |
|---|---|---|---|---|
| Liberal | George Nelson* | uncontested | | |
| Liberal hold | | Swing | | |

=== St. John's ===
St. John's
| Party | Candidate | Votes | % | ±% |
|---|---|---|---|---|
| Liberal | John Griffiths* | uncontested | | |
| Liberal hold | | Swing | | |

=== St. Luke's ===
St. Luke's
| Party | Candidate | Votes | % | ±% |
|---|---|---|---|---|
| Liberal | George Royle Chappell | uncontested | | |
| Liberal hold | | Swing | | |

=== St. Michael's ===
St. Michael's
| Party | Candidate | Votes | % | ±% |
|---|---|---|---|---|
| Liberal | Henry Hilton* | uncontested | | |
| Liberal hold | | Swing | | |
