= 1842 Manchester Borough Council election =

Local election in Manchester

- 1 November 1842

17 of 64 seats to Manchester Borough Council 33 seats needed for a majority
	First party
Party	Liberal
Last election	16 seats, 92.2%
Seats before	64
Seats won	17
Seats after	64
Seat change	Steady
Popular vote	456
Percentage	90.3%
Swing	▼1.9%
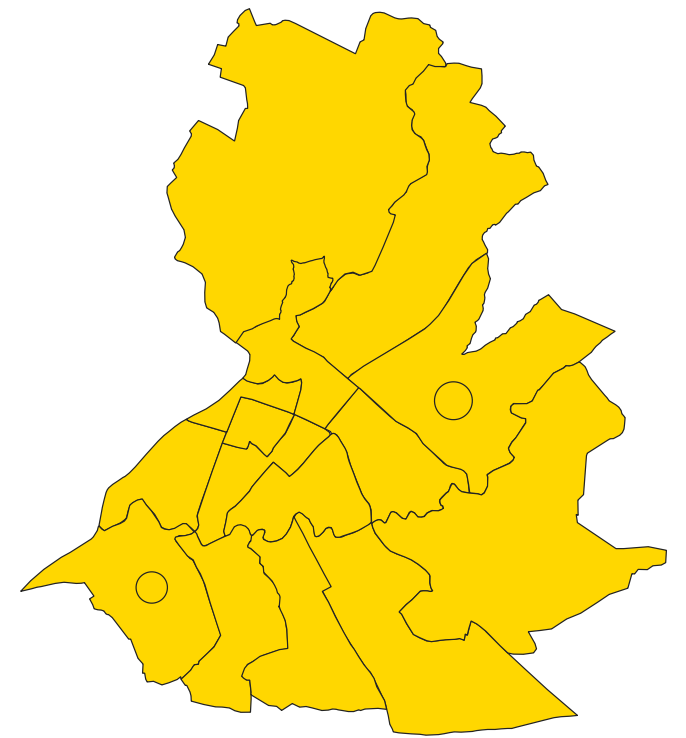
- Map of results of 1842 election
Leader of the Council before election
Liberal
Leader of the Council after election
Liberal

Elections to Manchester Borough Council were held on Tuesday, 1 November 1842. One third of the councillors seats were up for election, with each successful candidate to serve a three-year term of office. Conservative anti-corporators continued their boycott of municipal elections due to their opposition to Manchester's incorporation. Liberal incorporators retained overall control of the council.

== Election result ==
Party	Votes		Seats			Full Council	
Liberal Party	456 (90.3%)	▼1.9	17 (100.0%)	17 / 17	Steady	64 (100.0%)	64 / 64
Independent Conservative	46 (9.1%)	N/A	0 (0.0%)	0 / 17	N/A	0 (0.0%)	0 / 64
Independent	3 (0.6%)	▼0.2	0 (0.0%)	0 / 17	Steady	0 (0.0%)	0 / 64

=== Full council ===
↓
64

=== Aldermen ===
↓
16

=== Councillors ===
↓
48

== Ward results ==
=== All Saints' ===
All Saints'
Party	Candidate	Votes	%	±%
Liberal	Samuel Eveleigh*	uncontested		
Liberal hold		Swing		

=== Ardwick ===
Ardwick
Party	Candidate	Votes	%	±%
Liberal	James Thompson	uncontested		
Liberal hold		Swing		

=== Cheetham ===
Cheetham
Party	Candidate	Votes	%	±%
Liberal	William Shuttleworth	134	74.4	N/A
Ind. Conservative	Thomas Sugden	46	25.6	N/A
Majority		88	48.8	N/A
Turnout		180		
Liberal hold		Swing		

=== Collegiate Church ===
Collegiate Church
Party	Candidate	Votes	%	±%
Liberal	Thomas Handley	64	63.6	+31.9
Independent	Samuel Berry	3	4.5	+3.7
Majority		61	91.0	+75.5
Turnout		67		
Liberal hold		Swing		

=== Exchange ===
Exchange
Party	Candidate	Votes	%	±%
Liberal	William Rawson	uncontesed		
Liberal hold		Swing		

=== Medlock Street ===
Medlock Street
Party	Candidate	Votes	%	±%
Liberal	Frederick Phillips*	uncontested		
Liberal hold		Swing		

=== New Cross ===
New Cross
Party	Candidate	Votes	%	±%
Liberal	George Robertson	uncontested		
Liberal	John Swindells*	uncontested		
Liberal hold		Swing		
Liberal hold		Swing		

=== Oxford ===
Oxford
Party	Candidate	Votes	%	±%
Liberal	Samuel Lowcock*	153	59.3	N/A
Liberal	Abel Heywood	105	40.7	N/A
Majority		48	18.6	N/A
Turnout		258		
Liberal hold		Swing		

=== St. Ann's ===
St. Ann's
Party	Candidate	Votes	%	±%
Liberal	John Edward Taylor*	uncontested		
Liberal hold		Swing		

=== St. Clement's ===
St. Clement's
Party	Candidate	Votes	%	±%
Liberal	William Woodward*	uncontested		
Liberal hold		Swing		

=== St. George's ===
St. George's (2 vacancies)
Party	Candidate	Votes	%	±%
Liberal	Horatio Smith	uncontested		
Liberal	Benjamin Hampson	uncontested		
Liberal hold		Swing		
Liberal hold		Swing		

=== St. James' ===
St. James'
Party	Candidate	Votes	%	±%
Liberal	George Nelson*	uncontested		
Liberal hold		Swing		

=== St. John's ===
St. John's
Party	Candidate	Votes	%	±%
Liberal	James Whitworth	uncontested		
Liberal hold		Swing		

=== St. Luke's ===
St. Luke's
Party	Candidate	Votes	%	±%
Liberal	Walter Clark*	uncontested		
Liberal hold		Swing		

=== St. Michael's ===
St. Michael's
Party	Candidate	Votes	%	±%
Liberal	William Holmes	uncontested		
Liberal hold		Swing		
