= 1840 Manchester Borough Council election =

Local election in Manchester

- 2 November 1840

16 of 64 seats to Manchester Borough Council 33 seats needed for a majority
| | First party |
|---|---|
| Party | Liberal |
| Last election | 16 seats, 54.5% |
| Seats before | 64 |
| Seats won | 16 |
| Seats after | 64 |
| Seat change | Steady |
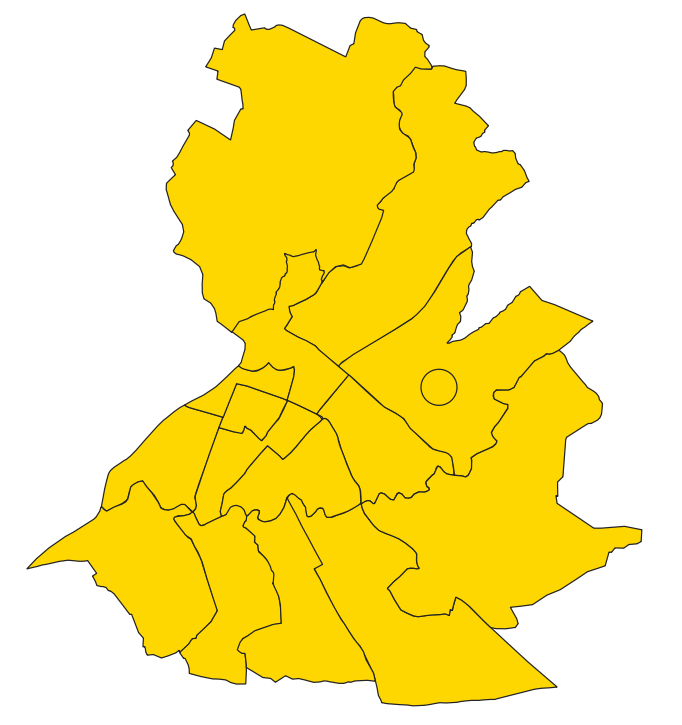
- Map of results of 1840 election
Leader of the Council before election
Liberal
Leader of the Council after election
Liberal

Elections to Manchester Borough Council were held on Monday, 2 November 1840. One third of the councillors seats were up for election, with each successful candidate to serve a three-year term of office. Conservative anti-corporators continued their boycott of municipal elections due to their opposition to Manchester's incorporation. Liberal incorporators retained overall control of the council.

== Election result ==
| Party | Seats | | | Full Council | |
| Liberal | 16 (100.0%) | 16 / 16 | Steady | 64 (100.0%) | 64 / 64 |

=== Full council ===
↓
64

=== Aldermen ===
↓
16

=== Councillors ===
↓
48

== Ward results ==
=== All Saints' ===
All Saints'
| Party | Candidate | Votes | % | ±% |
|---|---|---|---|---|
| Liberal | Samuel Dukinfield Darbishire* | uncontested | | |
| Liberal hold | | Swing | | |

=== Ardwick ===
Ardwick
| Party | Candidate | Votes | % | ±% |
|---|---|---|---|---|
| Liberal | Paul Ferdinand Willert* | uncontested | | |
| Liberal hold | | Swing | | |

=== Cheetham ===
Cheetham
| Party | Candidate | Votes | % | ±% |
|---|---|---|---|---|
| Liberal | John Harrison* | uncontested | | |
| Liberal hold | | Swing | | |

=== Collegiate Church ===
Collegiate Church
| Party | Candidate | Votes | % | ±% |
|---|---|---|---|---|
| Liberal | Thomas Woolley* | uncontested | | |
| Liberal hold | | Swing | | |

=== Exchange ===
Exchange
| Party | Candidate | Votes | % | ±% |
|---|---|---|---|---|
| Liberal | Elkanah Armitage* | uncontesed | | |
| Liberal hold | | Swing | | |

=== Medlock Street ===
Medlock Street
| Party | Candidate | Votes | % | ±% |
|---|---|---|---|---|
| Liberal | John Richardson White* | uncontested | | |
| Liberal hold | | Swing | | |

=== New Cross ===
New Cross
| Party | Candidate | Votes | % | ±% |
|---|---|---|---|---|
| Liberal | Thomas Dodgshon | uncontested | | |
| Liberal | James Hampson* | uncontested | | |
| Liberal hold | | Swing | | |
| Liberal hold | | Swing | | |

=== Oxford ===
Oxford
| Party | Candidate | Votes | % | ±% |
|---|---|---|---|---|
| Liberal | Richard Roberts* | uncontested | | |
| Liberal hold | | Swing | | |

=== St. Ann's ===
St. Ann's
| Party | Candidate | Votes | % | ±% |
|---|---|---|---|---|
| Liberal | John Herford* | uncontested | | |
| Liberal hold | | Swing | | |

=== St. Clement's ===
St. Clement's
| Party | Candidate | Votes | % | ±% |
|---|---|---|---|---|
| Liberal | George Pixton Kenworthy | uncontested | | |
| Liberal hold | | Swing | | |

=== St. George's ===
St. George's
| Party | Candidate | Votes | % | ±% |
|---|---|---|---|---|
| Liberal | David Holt | uncontested | | |
| Liberal hold | | Swing | | |

=== St. James' ===
St. James'
| Party | Candidate | Votes | % | ±% |
|---|---|---|---|---|
| Liberal | Richard Moore | uncontested | | |
| Liberal hold | | Swing | | |

=== St. John's ===
St. John's
| Party | Candidate | Votes | % | ±% |
|---|---|---|---|---|
| Liberal | George Brown* | uncontested | | |
| Liberal hold | | Swing | | |

=== St. Luke's ===
St. Luke's
| Party | Candidate | Votes | % | ±% |
|---|---|---|---|---|
| Liberal | Joseph Smith Grafton* | uncontested | | |
| Liberal hold | | Swing | | |

=== St. Michael's ===
St. Michael's
| Party | Candidate | Votes | % | ±% |
|---|---|---|---|---|
| Liberal | John Kirkham | uncontested | | |
| Liberal hold | | Swing | | |
