= 1883 Manchester City Council election =

Local election in Manchester

- 1 November 1883

16 of 64 seats to Manchester City Council 33 seats needed for a majority
	First party	Second party
Party	Liberal	Conservative
Last election	12 seats, 39.6%	4 seats, 60.4%
Seats before	40	24
Seats won	7	9
Seats after	39	25
Seat change	▼1	▲1
Popular vote	3,586	4,114
Percentage	46.6%	53.4%
Swing	▲7.0%	▼7.0%
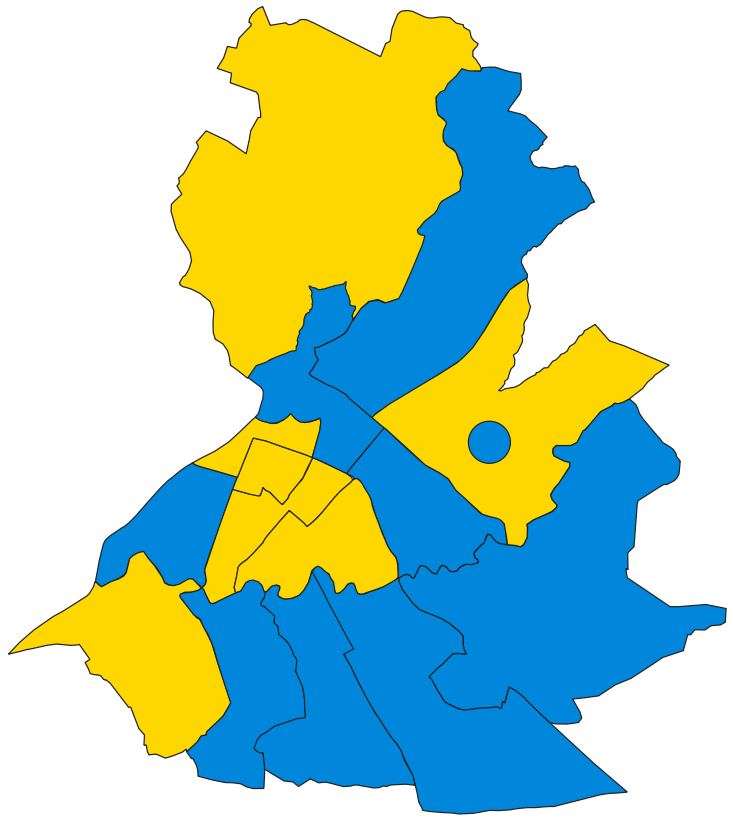
- Map of results of 1883 election
Leader of the Council before election
Liberal
Leader of the Council after election
Liberal

Elections to Manchester City Council took place on Thursday, 1 November 1883. One third of the councillors seats were up for election, with each successful candidate to serve a three-year term of office. The Liberal Party retained overall control of the council.

== Election result ==
Party	Votes		Seats			Full Council	
Liberal Party	3,586 (46.6%)	▲7.0	7 (43.8%)	7 / 16	▼1	39 (60.9%)	39 / 64
Conservative Party	4,114 (53.4%)	▼7.0	9 (56.2%)	9 / 16	▲1	25 (39.1%)	25 / 64

=== Full council ===
↓
39	25

=== Aldermen ===
↓
13	3

=== Councillors ===
↓
26	22

== Ward results ==
=== All Saints' ===
All Saints'
Party	Candidate	Votes	%	±%
Conservative	S. Ashcroft	881	57.5	+3.4
Liberal	J. Little*	652	42.5	−3.4
Majority		229	15.0	+6.8
Turnout		1,533		
Conservative gain from Liberal		Swing		

=== Ardwick ===
Ardwick
Party	Candidate	Votes	%	±%
Conservative	S. Chesters Thompson*	uncontested		
Conservative hold		Swing		

=== Cheetham ===
Cheetham
Party	Candidate	Votes	%	±%
Liberal	J. Rushworth*	uncontested		
Liberal hold		Swing		

=== Collegiate Church ===
Collegiate Church
Party	Candidate	Votes	%	±%
Conservative	W. Griffin*	uncontested		
Conservative hold		Swing		

=== Exchange ===
Exchange
Party	Candidate	Votes	%	±%
Liberal	J. Milling*	uncontested		
Liberal hold		Swing		

=== Medlock Street ===
Medlock Street
Party	Candidate	Votes	%	±%
Conservative	J. Craven*	uncontested		
Conservative hold		Swing		

=== New Cross ===
New Cross
Party	Candidate	Votes	%	±%
Liberal	A. McDougall	uncontested		
Conservative	H. Shaw*	uncontested		
Liberal hold		Swing		
Conservative hold		Swing		

=== Oxford ===
Oxford
Party	Candidate	Votes	%	±%
Liberal	B. T. Leech*	uncontested		
Liberal hold		Swing		

=== St. Ann's ===
St. Ann's
Party	Candidate	Votes	%	±%
Liberal	J. D. Milne	uncontested		
Liberal gain from Conservative		Swing		

=== St. Clement's ===
St. Clement's
Party	Candidate	Votes	%	±%
Conservative	N. C. Schou	765	51.5	N/A
Liberal	J. W. Southern*	719	48.5	N/A
Majority		46	3.0	N/A
Turnout		1,484		
Conservative gain from Liberal		Swing		

=== St. George's ===
St. George's
Party	Candidate	Votes	%	±%
Liberal	R. B. Goldsworthy*	uncontested		
Liberal hold		Swing		

=== St. James' ===
St. James'
Party	Candidate	Votes	%	±%
Liberal	A. E. Lloyd*	uncontested		
Liberal hold		Swing		

=== St. John's ===
St. John's
Party	Candidate	Votes	%	±%
Conservative	W. Robinson*	uncontested		
Conservative hold		Swing		

=== St. Luke's ===
St. Luke's
Party	Candidate	Votes	%	±%
Conservative	A. Marshall*	uncontested		
Conservative hold		Swing		

=== St. Michael's ===
St. Michael's
Party	Candidate	Votes	%	±%
Conservative	G. Moulton*	2,468	52.7	N/A
Liberal	R. Ramsbottom	2,215	47.3	N/A
Majority		253	5.4	N/A
Turnout		4,683		
Conservative hold		Swing		
