= St. Clement's (Manchester ward) =

- Ward
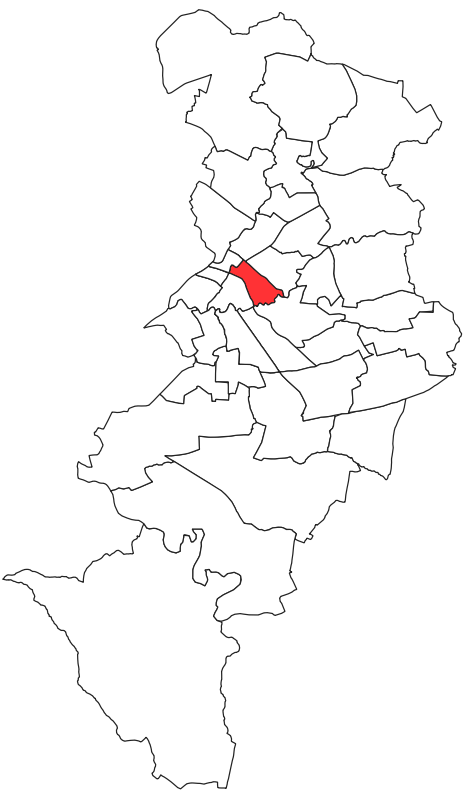
- St. Clement's ward (1931) within Manchester

- Coat of arms
- Country: United Kingdom
- Constituent country: England
- Region: North West England
- County borough: Manchester
- Created: December 1838
- Named for: St. Clement's

Government
  - Type: Unicameral
  - Body: Manchester City Council
- UK Parliamentary Constituency: Manchester Exchange

St. Clement's was an electoral division of Manchester City Council which was represented from 1838 until 1950. It covered part of Manchester city centre surrounding Piccadilly.

== Overview ==
St. Clement's ward was one of the fifteen municipal wards created in 1838, when the Manchester Borough Council was granted a Charter of Incorporation under the provisions of the Municipal Corporations Act 1835.

Initially, the ward's boundaries corresponded with those of District No.4 (St. Clement's) of the Manchester Township, which covered the area around Piccadilly and part of what is now the Northern Quarter in Manchester city centre. Its original boundaries remained in place until 1919 when an area around Oldham Street was transferred to the ward from the Collegiate Church ward. In 1950, the ward was abolished, and its area became part of the new St. Peter's ward.

From 1838 until 1885, the ward formed part of the Manchester Parliamentary constituency. From 1885 until 1918, it was part of the Manchester North West Parliamentary constituency. From 1918 until its abolition, it was part of the Manchester Exchange Parliamentary constituency.

== Councillors ==
Election	Councillor	Councillor	Councillor
1838	Thomas Molineaux (Lib)	William Neild (Lib)	William Woodward (Lib)
May 1839	Thomas Molineaux (Lib)	Matthew Curtis (Lib)	William Woodward (Lib)
1839	Thomas Molineaux (Lib)	Matthew Curtis (Lib)	William Woodward (Lib)
1840	Thomas Molineaux (Lib)	George Pixton Kenworthy (Lib)	William Woodward (Lib)
1841	Robert George Stracey (Lib)	George Pixton Kenworthy (Lib)	William Woodward (Lib)
1842	Robert George Stracey (Lib)	George Pixton Kenworthy (Lib)	William Woodward (Lib)
1843	Robert George Stracey (Lib)	John Leigh Cooke (Lib)	William Woodward (Lib)
1844	Robert George Stracey (Lib)	John Leigh Cooke (Lib)	William Woodward (Lib)
1845	Robert George Stracey (Lib)	John Leigh Cooke (Lib)	Bejamin Nicholls (Lib)
(1845–1872)
1872	J. Townsend (Con)	J. W. Whitaker (Con)	G. Anderton (Con)
1873	J. Townsend (Con)	T. A. Bazley (Lib)	G. Anderton (Con)
1874	J. Townsend (Con)	T. A. Bazley (Lib)	G. Anderton (Con)
1875	J. Townsend (Con)	T. A. Bazley (Lib)	E. Asquith (Lib)
1876	J. Townsend (Con)	T. A. Bazley (Lib)	E. Asquith (Lib)
1877	J. W. Southern (Lib)	T. A. Bazley (Lib)	E. Asquith (Lib)
1878	J. W. Southern (Lib)	T. A. Bazley (Lib)	E. Asquith (Lib)
1879	J. W. Southern (Lib)	T. A. Bazley (Lib)	E. Asquith (Lib)
1880	J. W. Southern (Lib)	T. A. Bazley (Lib)	E. Asquith (Lib)
1881	J. W. Southern (Lib)	T. A. Bazley (Lib)	E. Asquith (Lib)
1882	J. W. Southern (Lib)	T. A. Bazley (Lib)	E. Asquith (Lib)
1883	N. C. Schou (Con)	T. A. Bazley (Lib)	E. Asquith (Lib)
1884	N. C. Schou (Con)	T. A. Bazley (Lib)	E. Asquith (Lib)
1885	N. C. Schou (Con)	J. H. Andrews (Con)	E. Asquith (Lib)
1886	N. C. Schou (Con)	J. H. Andrews (Con)	E. Asquith (Lib)
1887	N. C. Schou (Con)	J. H. Andrews (Con)	C. Howarth (Con)
1888	N. C. Schou (Con)	J. H. Andrews (Con)	C. Howarth (Con)
1889	N. C. Schou (Con)	J. H. Andrews (Con)	C. Howarth (Con)
1890	N. C. Schou (Con)	J. H. Andrews (Con)	T. C. Abbott (Lib)
February 1891	G. D. Kelley (Lib)	J. H. Andrews (Con)	T. C. Abbott (Lib)
1891	G. D. Kelley (Lib)	J. H. Andrews (Con)	T. C. Abbott (Lib)
1892	G. D. Kelley (Lib)	J. H. Andrews (Con)	T. C. Abbott (Lib)
1893	G. D. Kelley (Lib)	J. H. Andrews (Con)	T. C. Abbott (Lib)
1894	G. D. Kelley (Lib)	J. H. Andrews (Con)	T. C. Abbott (Lib)
1895	T. Hassall (Con)	J. H. Andrews (Con)	T. C. Abbott (Lib)
1896	T. Hassall (Con)	J. H. Andrews (Con)	W. Spurr (Con)
1897	T. Hassall (Con)	J. Harrop (Lib)	W. Spurr (Con)
1898	T. Hassall (Con)	J. Harrop (Lib)	W. Spurr (Con)
1899	T. Hassall (Con)	J. Harrop (Lib)	J. B. Langley (Con)
1900	T. Hassall (Con)	J. Harrop (Lib)	J. B. Langley (Con)
1901	T. Hassall (Con)	J. Harrop (Lib)	J. B. Langley (Con)
1902	T. Hassall (Con)	J. Harrop (Lib)	J. B. Langley (Con)
1903	T. Hassall (Con)	J. Harrop (Lib)	J. B. Langley (Con)
1904	T. Hassall (Con)	J. Harrop (Lib)	J. B. Langley (Con)
1905	T. Hassall (Con)	J. Harrop (Lib)	G. F. Burditt (Lib)
1906	T. Hassall (Con)	J. Harrop (Lib)	G. F. Burditt (Lib)
1907	T. Hassall (Con)	J. Harrop (Lib)	G. F. Burditt (Lib)
1908	T. Hassall (Con)	J. Harrop (Lib)	J. B. Langley (Con)
October 1909	G. B. Kershaw (Con)	J. Harrop (Lib)	J. B. Langley (Con)
1909	G. B. Kershaw (Con)	J. Harrop (Lib)	J. B. Langley (Con)
1910	T. C. Abbott (Lib)	J. Harrop (Lib)	J. B. Langley (Con)
March 1911	T. C. Abbott (Lib)	J. H. Helm (Lib)	J. B. Langley (Con)
1911	T. C. Abbott (Lib)	J. H. Helm (Lib)	W. Melland (Lib)
1912	T. C. Abbott (Lib)	J. H. Helm (Lib)	W. Melland (Lib)
1913	T. C. Abbott (Lib)	J. H. Helm (Lib)	W. Melland (Lib)
May 1914	W. Harrop (Lib)	J. H. Helm (Lib)	W. Melland (Lib)
1914	W. Harrop (Lib)	J. H. Helm (Lib)	W. Melland (Lib)
1919	W. Harrop (Lib)	J. H. Helm (Lib)	W. Melland (Lib)
1920	W. Harrop (Lib)	J. H. Helm (Lib)	W. Melland (Lib)
1921	W. Harrop (Lib)	J. H. Helm (Lib)	W. Melland (Lib)
1922	W. Harrop (Lib)	J. H. Helm (Lib)	W. Melland (Lib)
1923	J. Goodwin (Con)	J. H. Helm (Lib)	W. Melland (Lib)
1924	J. Goodwin (Con)	J. H. Helm (Lib)	W. Melland (Lib)
1925	J. Goodwin (Con)	H. D. Judson (Con)	W. Melland (Lib)
1926	J. Goodwin (Con)	H. D. Judson (Con)	W. Melland (Lib)
1927	J. Goodwin (Con)	H. D. Judson (Con)	W. Melland (Lib)
1928	J. Goodwin (Con)	H. D. Judson (Con)	W. Melland (Lib)
October 1929	J. Goodwin (Con)	H. D. Judson (Con)	B. McManus (Lib)
1929	A. E. Jones (Lab)	H. D. Judson (Con)	B. McManus (Lib)
1930	A. E. Jones (Lab)	H. D. Judson (Con)	B. McManus (Lib)
1931	A. E. Jones (Lab)	H. D. Judson (Con)	B. McManus (Lib)
November 1931	A. E. Jones (Lab)	P. C. Parker (Con)	B. McManus (Lib)
1932	J. E. Fitzsimons (Lib)	P. C. Parker (Con)	B. McManus (Lib)
1933	J. E. Fitzsimons (Lib)	P. C. Parker (Con)	B. McManus (Lib)
1934	J. E. Fitzsimons (Lib)	P. C. Parker (Con)	B. McManus (Lib)
1935	J. E. Fitzsimons (Lib)	P. C. Parker (Con)	B. McManus (Lib)
1936	J. E. Fitzsimons (Lib)	P. C. Parker (Con)	B. McManus (Lib)
1937	J. E. Fitzsimons (Lib)	P. C. Parker (Con)	B. McManus (Lib)
October 1938	J. E. Fitzsimons (Con)	P. C. Parker (Con)	B. McManus (Lib)
1938	J. E. Fitzsimons (Con)	P. C. Parker (Con)	B. McManus (Lib)
1945	A. E. Smith (Lib)	J. E. Fitzsimons (Con)	J. L. Cobon (Con)
1946	A. E. Smith (Lib)	J. E. Fitzsimons (Con)	J. L. Cobon (Con)
1947	N. Beer (Con)	J. E. Fitzsimons (Con)	J. L. Cobon (Con)
1949	N. Beer (Con)	J. E. Fitzsimons (Con)	J. L. Cobon (Con)

== Elections ==
=== Elections in 1830s ===
==== December 1838 ====
1838 (3 vacancies)
Party	Candidate	Votes	%	±%
Liberal	Thomas Molineaux	204	100.0	
Liberal	William Neild	204	100.0	
Liberal	William Woodward	203	99.5	
Turnout		204		
Liberal win (new seat)				
Liberal win (new seat)				
Liberal win (new seat)				

==== May 1839 (by-election) ====
By-election: 16 May 1839
Party	Candidate	Votes	%	±%
Liberal	Matthew Curtis	uncontested		
Liberal hold		Swing		

==== November 1839 ====
1839
Party	Candidate	Votes	%	±%
Liberal	William Woodward*	uncontested		
Liberal hold		Swing		

=== Elections in 1840s ===
==== November 1840 ====
1840
Party	Candidate	Votes	%	±%
Liberal	George Pixton Kenworthy	uncontested		
Liberal hold		Swing		

==== November 1841 ====
1841
Party	Candidate	Votes	%	±%
Liberal	Robert George Stracey	uncontested		
Liberal hold		Swing		

==== November 1842 ====
1842
Party	Candidate	Votes	%	±%
Liberal	William Woodward*	uncontested		
Liberal hold		Swing		

==== November 1843 ====
1843
Party	Candidate	Votes	%	±%
Liberal	John Leigh Cooke	uncontested		
Liberal hold		Swing		

==== November 1844 ====
1844
Party	Candidate	Votes	%	±%
Liberal	Robert George Stracey*	uncontested		
Liberal hold		Swing		

==== November 1845 ====
1845
Party	Candidate	Votes	%	±%
Liberal	Benjamin Nicholls	uncontested		
Liberal hold		Swing		

=== Elections in 1870s ===
==== November 1872 ====
1872
Party	Candidate	Votes	%	±%
Conservative	G. Anderton*	1,132	64.6	
Liberal	E. Asquith	621	35.4	
Majority		511	29.2	
Turnout		1,753		
Conservative hold		Swing		

==== November 1873 ====
1873
Party	Candidate	Votes	%	±%
Liberal	T. A. Bazley	1,100	55.4	+20.0
Conservative	J. W. Whitaker*	837	42.1	−22.5
Independent	C. H. Bazley	50	2.5	N/A
Majority		263	13.3	
Turnout		1,987		
Liberal gain from Conservative		Swing		

==== November 1874 ====
1874
Party	Candidate	Votes	%	±%
Conservative	J. Townsend*	929	50.5	+8.4
Liberal	J. W. Southern	910	49.5	−5.9
Majority		19	1.0	
Turnout		1,839		
Conservative hold		Swing		

==== November 1875 ====
1875
Party	Candidate	Votes	%	±%
Liberal	E. Asquith	1,003	53.8	+4.3
Conservative	G. Anderton*	860	46.2	−4.3
Majority		143	7.6	
Turnout		1,863		
Liberal gain from Conservative		Swing		

==== November 1876 ====
1876
Party	Candidate	Votes	%	±%
Liberal	T. A. Bazley*	uncontested		
Liberal hold		Swing		

==== November 1877 ====
1877
Party	Candidate	Votes	%	±%
Liberal	J. W. Southern	uncontested		
Liberal gain from Conservative		Swing		

==== November 1878 ====
1878
Party	Candidate	Votes	%	±%
Liberal	E. Asquith*	963	55.8	N/A
Conservative	J. G. Shallcross	763	44.2	N/A
Majority		200	11.6	N/A
Turnout		1,726		
Liberal hold		Swing		

==== November 1879 ====
1879
Party	Candidate	Votes	%	±%
Liberal	T. A. Bazley*	uncontested		
Liberal hold		Swing		

=== Elections in 1880s ===
==== November 1880 ====
1880
Party	Candidate	Votes	%	±%
Liberal	J. W. Southern*	uncontested		
Liberal hold		Swing		

==== November 1881 ====
1881
Party	Candidate	Votes	%	±%
Liberal	E. Asquith*	772	50.9	N/A
Conservative	B. Gibbons	746	49.1	N/A
Majority		26	1.8	N/A
Turnout		1,518		
Liberal hold		Swing		

==== November 1882 ====
1882
Party	Candidate	Votes	%	±%
Liberal	T. A. Bazley*	uncontested		
Liberal hold		Swing		

==== November 1883 ====
1883
Party	Candidate	Votes	%	±%
Conservative	N. C. Schou	765	51.5	N/A
Liberal	J. W. Southern*	719	48.5	N/A
Majority		46	3.0	N/A
Turnout		1,484		
Conservative gain from Liberal		Swing		

==== November 1884 ====
1884
Party	Candidate	Votes	%	±%
Liberal	E. Asquith*	774	51.2	+2.7
Conservative	B. Gibbons	737	48.8	−2.7
Majority		37	2.4	
Turnout		1,511		
Liberal hold		Swing		

==== November 1885 ====
1885
Party	Candidate	Votes	%	±%
Conservative	J. H. Andrews	798	52.0	+3.2
Liberal	T. A. Bazley*	737	48.0	−3.2
Majority		61	4.0	
Turnout		1,535		
Conservative gain from Liberal		Swing		

==== November 1886 ====
1886
Party	Candidate	Votes	%	±%
Conservative	N. Schou*	876	54.2	+2.2
Liberal	S. Moore	739	45.8	−2.2
Majority		137	8.4	+4.4
Turnout		1,615		
Conservative hold		Swing		

==== November 1887 ====
1887
Party	Candidate	Votes	%	±%
Conservative	C. Howarth	uncontested		
Conservative gain from Liberal		Swing		

==== November 1888 ====
1888
Party	Candidate	Votes	%	±%
Conservative	J. H. Andrews*	830	57.4	N/A
Liberal	T. Swindells	615	42.6	N/A
Majority		215	14.8	N/A
Turnout		1,445		
Conservative hold		Swing		

==== November 1889 ====
1889
Party	Candidate	Votes	%	±%
Conservative	N. C. Schou*	800	55.1	−2.3
Liberal	J. Brierley	652	44.9	+2.3
Majority		148	10.2	−4.6
Turnout		1,452		
Conservative hold		Swing		

=== Elections in 1890s ===
==== November 1890 ====
1890
Party	Candidate	Votes	%	±%
Liberal	T. C. Abbott	803	54.6	+9.7
Conservative	J. Brierley	668	45.4	−9.7
Majority		135	9.2	
Turnout		1,471		
Liberal gain from Conservative		Swing		

==== February 1891 (by-election) ====
By-election: 12 February 1891
Party	Candidate	Votes	%	±%
Liberal	G. D. Kelley	uncontested		
Liberal gain from Conservative		Swing		

==== November 1891 ====
1891
Party	Candidate	Votes	%	±%
Conservative	J. H. Andrews*	852	54.8	+9.4
Liberal	T. Swindells	703	45.2	−9.4
Majority		149	9.6	
Turnout		1,555		
Conservative hold		Swing		

==== November 1892 ====
1892
Party	Candidate	Votes	%	±%
Liberal	G. D. Kelley*	716	53.7	+8.5
Conservative	R. Smith	618	46.3	−8.5
Majority		98	7.4	
Turnout		1,334		
Liberal hold		Swing		

==== November 1893 ====
1893
Party	Candidate	Votes	%	±%
Liberal	T. C. Abbott*	740	53.4	−0.3
Conservative	G. H. Broadbent	645	46.6	+0.3
Majority		95	6.8	−0.6
Turnout		1,385		
Liberal hold		Swing		

==== November 1894 ====
1894
Party	Candidate	Votes	%	±%
Conservative	J. H. Andrews*	uncontested		
Conservative hold		Swing		

==== November 1895 ====
1895
Party	Candidate	Votes	%	±%
Conservative	T. Hassall	666	50.6	N/A
Liberal	G. D. Kelley*	650	49.4	N/A
Majority		16	1.2	N/A
Turnout		1,316		
Conservative gain from Liberal		Swing		

==== November 1896 ====
1896
Party	Candidate	Votes	%	±%
Conservative	W. Spurr	798	55.6	+5.0
Liberal	T. C. Abbott*	637	44.4	−5.0
Majority		161	11.2	+10.0
Turnout		1,435		
Conservative gain from Liberal		Swing		

==== November 1897 ====
1897
Party	Candidate	Votes	%	±%
Liberal	J. Harrop	819	53.6	+9.2
Conservative	F. R. Cooper	708	46.4	−9.2
Majority		111	7.2	
Turnout		1,527		
Liberal gain from Conservative		Swing		

==== November 1898 ====
1898
Party	Candidate	Votes	%	±%
Conservative	T. Hassall*	865	60.4	+14.0
Liberal	J. Johnson	567	39.6	−14.0
Majority		298	20.8	
Turnout		1,432		
Conservative hold		Swing		

==== November 1899 ====
1899
Party	Candidate	Votes	%	±%
Conservative	J. B. Langley*	713	54.3	−6.1
Liberal	R. Torkington	600	45.7	+6.1
Majority		113	8.6	−12.2
Turnout		1,313		
Conservative hold		Swing		

=== Elections in 1900s ===
==== November 1900 ====
1900
Party	Candidate	Votes	%	±%
Liberal	J. Harrop*	751	54.9	+9.2
Conservative	R. A. Kinder	616	45.1	−9.2
Majority		125	9.8	
Turnout		1,367		
Liberal hold		Swing		

==== November 1901 ====
1901
Party	Candidate	Votes	%	±%
Conservative	T. Hassall*	uncontested		
Conservative hold		Swing		

==== November 1902 ====
1902
Party	Candidate	Votes	%	±%
Conservative	J. B. Langley*	uncontested		
Conservative hold		Swing		

==== November 1903 ====
1903
Party	Candidate	Votes	%	±%
Liberal	J. Harrop*	uncontested		
Liberal hold		Swing		

==== November 1904 ====
1904
Party	Candidate	Votes	%	±%
Conservative	T. Hassall*	uncontested		
Conservative hold		Swing		

==== November 1905 ====
1905
Party	Candidate	Votes	%	±%
Liberal	G. F. Burditt	638	55.4	N/A
Conservative	J. B. Langley*	513	44.6	N/A
Majority		125	10.8	N/A
Turnout		1,151		
Liberal gain from Conservative		Swing		

==== November 1906 ====
1906
Party	Candidate	Votes	%	±%
Liberal	J. Harrop*	uncontested		
Liberal hold		Swing		

==== November 1907 ====
1907
Party	Candidate	Votes	%	±%
Conservative	T. Hassall*	uncontested		
Conservative hold		Swing		

==== November 1908 ====
1908
Party	Candidate	Votes	%	±%
Conservative	J. B. Langley	417	53.2	N/A
Liberal	G. F. Burditt*	367	46.8	N/A
Majority		50	6.4	N/A
Turnout		784		
Conservative gain from Liberal		Swing		

==== October 1909 (by-election) ====
By-election: 11 October 1909
Party	Candidate	Votes	%	±%
Conservative	G. B. Kershaw	uncontested		
Conservative hold		Swing		

==== November 1909 ====
1909
Party	Candidate	Votes	%	±%
Liberal	J. Harrop*	uncontested		
Liberal hold		Swing		

=== Elections in 1910s ===
==== November 1910 ====
1910
Party	Candidate	Votes	%	±%
Liberal	T. C. Abbott	532	53.8	N/A
Conservative	W. E. Pownall	456	46.2	N/A
Majority		76	7.6	N/A
Turnout		988		
Liberal gain from Conservative		Swing		

==== March 1911 (by-election) ====
By-election: 8 March 1911
Party	Candidate	Votes	%	±%
Liberal	J. H. Helm	583	54.8	+1.0
Conservative	W. E. Pownall	481	45.2	−1.0
Majority		102	9.6	+2.0
Turnout		1,064		
Liberal hold		Swing		

==== November 1911 ====
1911
Party	Candidate	Votes	%	±%
Liberal	W. Melland	611	54.7	+0.9
Conservative	J. B. Langley*	505	45.3	−0.9
Majority		106	9.4	+1.8
Turnout		1,116		
Liberal gain from Conservative		Swing		

==== November 1912 ====
1912
Party	Candidate	Votes	%	±%
Liberal	J. H. Helm*	559	52.7	−2.0
Conservative	W. R. W. Murray	501	47.3	+2.0
Majority		58	5.4	−4.0
Turnout		1,060		
Liberal hold		Swing		

==== November 1913 ====
1913
Party	Candidate	Votes	%	±%
Liberal	T. C. Abbott*	uncontested		
Liberal hold		Swing		

==== May 1914 (by-election) ====
By-election: 30 May 1914
Party	Candidate	Votes	%	±%
Liberal	W. Harrop	563	58.2	N/A
Conservative	E. S. Ball	404	41.8	N/A
Majority		159	16.4	N/A
Turnout		967		
Liberal hold		Swing		

==== November 1914 ====
1914
Party	Candidate	Votes	%	±%
Liberal	W. Melland*	uncontested		
Liberal hold		Swing		

==== November 1919 ====
1919 (new boundaries)
Party	Candidate	Votes	%	±%
Liberal	J. H. Helm*	uncontested		
Liberal hold		Swing		

=== Elections in 1920s ===
==== November 1920 ====
1920
Party	Candidate	Votes	%	±%
Liberal	W. Harrop*	uncontested		
Liberal hold		Swing		

==== November 1921 ====
1921
Party	Candidate	Votes	%	±%
Liberal	W. Melland*	uncontested		
Liberal hold		Swing		

==== November 1922 ====
1922
Party	Candidate	Votes	%	±%
Liberal	J. H. Helm*	uncontested		
Liberal hold		Swing		

==== November 1923 ====
1923
Party	Candidate	Votes	%	±%
Conservative	J. Goodwin	960	53.3	N/A
Liberal	W. H. Wood	842	46.7	N/A
Majority		118	6.6	N/A
Turnout		1,802		
Conservative gain from Liberal		Swing		

==== November 1924 ====
1924
Party	Candidate	Votes	%	±%
Liberal	W. Melland*	uncontested		
Liberal hold		Swing		

==== November 1925 ====
1925
Party	Candidate	Votes	%	±%
Conservative	H. D. Judson	1,000	50.6	N/A
Liberal	W. H. Wood	975	49.4	N/A
Majority		25	1.2	N/A
Turnout		1,975	64.3	N/A
Conservative gain from Liberal		Swing		

==== November 1926 ====
1926
Party	Candidate	Votes	%	±%
Conservative	J. Goodwin*	819	39.7	−10.9
Labour	J. Cassey	753	36.5	N/A
Liberal	C. N. Glidewell	489	23.7	−25.7
Majority		66	3.2	+2.0
Turnout		2,061	66.4	+2.1
Conservative hold		Swing		

==== November 1927 ====
1927
Party	Candidate	Votes	%	±%
Liberal	W. Melland*	1,012	49.4	+25.7
Conservative	W. Somerville	649	31.7	−8.0
Labour	G. Harrison	379	18.5	−18.0
Prohibitionist	J. Rochford	8	0.4	N/A
Majority		363	17.7	
Turnout		2,048	65.4	−1.0
Liberal hold		Swing		

==== November 1928 ====
1928
Party	Candidate	Votes	%	±%
Conservative	H. D. Judson*	794	37.2	+5.5
Liberal	B. McManus	692	32.4	−17.0
Labour	A. E. Jones	649	30.4	+11.9
Majority		102	4.8	
Turnout		2,135	68.8	+3.4
Conservative hold		Swing		

==== October 1929 (by-election) ====
By-election: 15 October 1929
Party	Candidate	Votes	%	±%
Liberal	B. McManus	684	35.8	+3.4
Labour	A. E. Jones	623	32.6	+2.2
Conservative	A. Ashton	604	31.6	−5.6
Majority		61	3.2	
Turnout		1,911	61.6	−7.2
Liberal hold		Swing		

==== November 1929 ====
1929
Party	Candidate	Votes	%	±%
Labour	A. E. Jones	772	38.8	+8.4
Conservative	J. Goodwin*	662	33.3	−3.9
Liberal	C. H. Travis	543	27.3	−5.1
Independent	W. H. Booth	11	0.6	N/A
Majority		110	5.5	
Turnout		1,988	58.0	−10.8
Labour gain from Conservative		Swing		

=== Elections in 1930s ===
==== November 1930 ====
1930
Party	Candidate	Votes	%	±%
Liberal	B. McManus*	862	43.2	+15.9
Conservative	J. W. Brownhill	621	31.1	−2.2
Labour	J. Cossey	512	25.7	−13.1
Majority		241	12.1	
Turnout		1,995		
Liberal hold		Swing		

==== November 1931 ====
1931
Party	Candidate	Votes	%	±%
Conservative	H. D. Judson*	1,057	58.0	+26.9
Labour	A. Lees	765	42.0	+16.3
Majority		292	16.0	
Turnout		1,822	55.1	
Conservative hold		Swing		

==== November 1931 (by-election) ====
By-election: 24 November 1931
Party	Candidate	Votes	%	±%
Conservative	P. C. Parker	761	37.3	−20.7
Liberal	J. E. Fitzsimons	693	34.0	N/A
Labour	A. Lees	584	28.7	−13.3
Majority		68	3.3	−12.7
Turnout		2,038	61.7	+6.6
Conservative hold		Swing		

==== November 1932 ====
1932
Party	Candidate	Votes	%	±%
Liberal	J. E. Fitzsimons	1,049	52.8	N/A
Labour	A. E. Jones*	939	47.2	+5.2
Majority		110	5.6	
Turnout		1,988		
Liberal gain from Labour		Swing		

==== November 1933 ====
1933
Party	Candidate	Votes	%	±%
Liberal	B. McManus*	1,105	55.6	+2.8
Labour	A. E. Jones	881	44.4	−2.8
Majority		224	11.2	+5.6
Turnout		1,986		
Liberal hold		Swing		

==== November 1934 ====
1934
Party	Candidate	Votes	%	±%
Conservative	P. C. Parker*	uncontested		
Conservative hold		Swing		

==== November 1935 ====
1935
Party	Candidate	Votes	%	±%
Liberal	J. E. Fitzsimons*	uncontested		
Liberal hold		Swing		

==== November 1936 ====
1936
Party	Candidate	Votes	%	±%
Liberal	B. McManus*	uncontested		
Liberal hold		Swing		

==== November 1937 ====
1937
Party	Candidate	Votes	%	±%
Conservative	P. C. Parker*	uncontested		
Conservative hold		Swing		

==== November 1938 ====
1938
Party	Candidate	Votes	%	±%
Conservative	J. E. Fitzsimons*	uncontested		
Conservative hold		Swing		

=== Elections in 1940s ===
==== November 1945 ====
1945 (2 vacancies)
Party	Candidate	Votes	%	±%
Conservative	J. L. Cobon*	338	44.1	N/A
Liberal	A. E. Smith*	291	38.0	N/A
Labour	W. Newton	137	17.9	N/A
Labour	L. Palethorpe	128	16.7	N/A
Majority		154	20.1	N/A
Turnout		766		
Conservative hold		Swing		
Liberal hold		Swing		

==== November 1946 ====
1946
Party	Candidate	Votes	%	±%
Conservative	J. E. Fitzsimons*	345	72.8	+28.7
Labour	W. Sampey	119	25.1	+7.2
Independent	F. R. Phillips	10	2.1	N/A
Majority		226	47.7	
Turnout		474		
Conservative hold		Swing		

==== November 1947 ====
1947
Party	Candidate	Votes	%	±%
Conservative	N. Beer	387	67.7	−5.1
Labour	H. McRoy	95	16.6	−8.5
Liberal	J. E. McManus	90	15.7	N/A
Majority		292	51.1	+3.4
Turnout		572		
Conservative gain from Liberal		Swing		

==== May 1949 ====
1949
Party	Candidate	Votes	%	±%
Conservative	J. L. Cobon	353	75.8	+8.1
Labour	W. Binns	113	24.2	+7.6
Majority		240	51.6	+0.5
Turnout		466		
Conservative hold		Swing		

== See also ==
- Manchester City Council
- Manchester City Council elections
