= St. James' (Manchester ward) =

- Ward
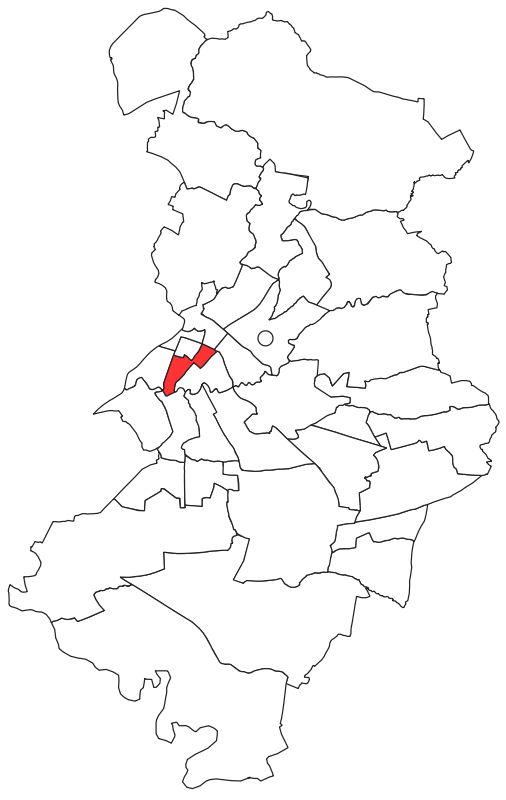
- St. James' ward (1909) within Manchester

- Coat of arms
- Country: United Kingdom
- Constituent country: England
- Region: North West England
- County borough: Manchester
- Created: December 1838
- Named for: St. James'

Government
  - Type: Unicameral
  - Body: Manchester City Council
- UK Parliamentary Constituency: Manchester Exchange

St. James' was an electoral division of Manchester City Council which was represented from 1838 until 1919. It covered part of Manchester city centre including the area now known as the city's Civic Quarter.

== Overview ==
St. James' ward was one of the fifteen municipal wards created in 1838, when the Manchester Borough Council was granted a Charter of Incorporation under the provisions of the Municipal Corporations Act 1835.

Initially, the ward's boundaries corresponded with those of Districts No.8 (St. James') and No.11 (St. Peter's) of the Manchester Township, which covered an area of Manchester city centre around St. Peter's Square and what is now Chinatown. In 1919, the ward was abolished, and its area was divided between the Oxford and St. John's wards.

From 1838 until 1885, the ward formed part of the Manchester Parliamentary constituency. From 1885 until 1918, it was part of the Manchester North West Parliamentary constituency. It briefly formed part of the Manchester Exchange Parliamentary constituency from 1918 until its abolition.

== Councillors ==
Election	Councillor	Councillor	Councillor
1838	William Nuttall (Lib)	William Romaine Callender (Lib)	George Nelson (Lib)
May 1839	William Nuttall (Lib)	Thomas Gasquoine (Lib)	George Nelson (Lib)
1839	William Nuttall (Lib)	Thomas Gasquoine (Lib)	George Nelson (Lib)
1840	David Ainsworth (Lib)	Richard Moore (Lib)	George Nelson (Lib)
1841	David Ainsworth (Lib)	Richard Moore (Lib)	George Nelson (Lib)
1842	David Ainsworth (Lib)	Richard Moore (Lib)	George Nelson (Lib)
1843	David Ainsworth (Lib)	Richard Moore (Lib)	George Nelson (Lib)
1844	David Ainsworth (Lib)	Richard Moore (Lib)	George Nelson (Lib)
1845	David Ainsworth (Lib)	Richard Moore (Lib)	George Nelson (Lib)
(1845–1872)
1872	E. Holt (Con)	P. Goldschmidt (Lib)	J. Waterhouse (Con)
1873	E. Holt (Con)	R. Lovatt Reade (Con)	J. Waterhouse (Con)
1874	J. Spencer (Lib)	P. Goldschmidt (Lib)	J. Waterhouse (Con)
1875	J. Spencer (Lib)	P. Goldschmidt (Lib)	J. Waterhouse (Con)
1876	J. Spencer (Lib)	P. Goldschmidt (Lib)	W. T. Windsor (Con)
1877	J. Spencer (Lib)	P. Goldschmidt (Lib)	W. T. Windsor (Con)
1878	J. Spencer (Lib)	P. Goldschmidt (Lib)	W. T. Windsor (Con)
1879	J. Spencer (Lib)	P. Goldschmidt (Lib)	W. T. Windsor (Con)
1880	A. E. Lloyd (Lib)	P. Goldschmidt (Lib)	W. T. Windsor (Con)
1881	A. E. Lloyd (Lib)	P. Goldschmidt (Lib)	W. T. Windsor (Con)
1882	A. E. Lloyd (Lib)	P. Goldschmidt (Lib)	W. T. Windsor (Con)
1883	A. E. Lloyd (Lib)	P. Goldschmidt (Lib)	W. T. Windsor (Con)
1884	A. E. Lloyd (Lib)	P. Goldschmidt (Lib)	W. T. Windsor (Con)
1885	A. E. Lloyd (Lib)	A. Murray (Lib)	W. T. Windsor (Con)
1886	A. E. Lloyd (Lib)	A. Murray (Lib U)	W. T. Windsor (Con)
1887	A. E. Lloyd (Lib)	A. Murray (Lib U)	W. T. Windsor (Con)
August 1888	A. E. Lloyd (Lib)	A. Murray (Lib U)	H. Samson (Con)
1888	A. E. Lloyd (Lib)	A. Murray (Lib U)	H. Samson (Con)
1889	A. E. Lloyd (Lib)	A. Murray (Lib U)	H. Samson (Con)
1890	A. E. Lloyd (Lib)	A. Murray (Lib U)	H. Samson (Con)
1891	A. E. Lloyd (Lib)	A. Murray (Lib U)	H. Samson (Con)
April 1892	H. J. Goldschmidt (Lib)	A. Murray (Lib U)	H. Samson (Con)
1892	H. J. Goldschmidt (Lib)	A. Murray (Lib U)	H. Samson (Con)
1893	H. J. Goldschmidt (Lib)	A. Murray (Lib U)	H. Samson (Con)
1894	H. J. Goldschmidt (Lib)	A. Murray (Lib U)	H. Samson (Con)
1895	H. J. Goldschmidt (Lib)	A. Murray (Lib U)	H. Samson (Con)
1896	H. J. Goldschmidt (Lib)	A. Murray (Lib U)	H. Samson (Con)
1897	H. J. Goldschmidt (Lib)	T. T. Shann (Con)	H. Samson (Con)
1898	H. J. Goldschmidt (Lib)	T. T. Shann (Con)	H. Samson (Con)
1899	H. J. Goldschmidt (Lib)	T. T. Shann (Con)	H. Samson (Con)
1900	H. J. Goldschmidt (Lib)	T. T. Shann (Con)	H. Samson (Con)
1901	H. J. Goldschmidt (Lib)	T. T. Shann (Con)	H. Samson (Con)
1902	H. J. Goldschmidt (Lib)	T. T. Shann (Con)	H. Samson (Con)
1903	H. J. Goldschmidt (Lib)	T. T. Shann (Con)	H. Samson (Con)
1904	H. J. Goldschmidt (Lib)	T. T. Shann (Con)	H. Samson (Con)
1905	H. J. Goldschmidt (Lib)	T. T. Shann (Con)	H. Samson (Con)
June 1906	E. Holt (Lib)	T. T. Shann (Con)	H. Samson (Con)
1906	E. Holt (Lib)	T. T. Shann (Con)	H. Samson (Con)
January 1907	E. Holt (Lib)	T. T. Shann (Con)	S. W. Royse (Con)
1907	A. H. Megson (Con)	T. T. Shann (Con)	S. W. Royse (Con)
1908	A. H. Megson (Con)	T. T. Shann (Con)	S. W. Royse (Con)
1909	A. H. Megson (Con)	T. T. Shann (Con)	S. W. Royse (Con)
1910	A. H. Megson (Con)	T. T. Shann (Con)	S. W. Royse (Con)
1911	A. H. Megson (Con)	T. T. Shann (Con)	S. W. Royse (Con)
November 1911	A. H. Megson (Con)	J. Hislop (Con)	S. W. Royse (Con)
1912	A. H. Megson (Con)	J. Hislop (Con)	S. W. Royse (Con)
1913	A. H. Megson (Con)	J. Hislop (Con)	S. W. Royse (Con)
1914	A. H. Megson (Con)	J. Hislop (Con)	S. W. Royse (Con)

== Elections ==
=== Elections in 1830s ===
==== December 1838 ====
1838 (3 vacancies)
Party	Candidate	Votes	%	±%
Liberal	William Nuttall	284	100.0	
Liberal	William Romaine Callender	281	98.9	
Liberal	George Nelson	281	98.9	
Turnout		284		
Liberal win (new seat)				
Liberal win (new seat)				
Liberal win (new seat)				

==== May 1839 (by-election) ====
By-election: 16 May 1839
Party	Candidate	Votes	%	±%
Liberal	Thomas Gasquoine	uncontested		
Liberal hold		Swing		

==== November 1839 ====
1839
Party	Candidate	Votes	%	±%
Liberal	George Nelson*	uncontested		
Liberal hold		Swing		

=== Elections in 1840s ===
==== November 1840 ====
1840
Party	Candidate	Votes	%	±%
Liberal	Richard Moore	uncontested		
Liberal hold		Swing		

==== November 1841 ====
1841
Party	Candidate	Votes	%	±%
Liberal	David Ainsworth*	uncontested		
Liberal hold		Swing		

==== November 1842 ====
1842
Party	Candidate	Votes	%	±%
Liberal	George Nelson*	uncontested		
Liberal hold		Swing		

==== November 1843 ====
1843
Party	Candidate	Votes	%	±%
Liberal	Richard Moore*	uncontested		
Liberal hold		Swing		

==== November 1844 ====
1844
Party	Candidate	Votes	%	±%
Liberal	David Ainsworth*	uncontested		
Liberal hold		Swing		

==== November 1845 ====
1845
Party	Candidate	Votes	%	±%
Liberal	George Nelson*	uncontested		
Liberal hold		Swing		

=== Elections in 1870s ===
==== November 1872 ====
1872
Party	Candidate	Votes	%	±%
Conservative	J. Waterhouse*	uncontested		
Conservative hold		Swing		

==== November 1873 ====
1873
Party	Candidate	Votes	%	±%
Conservative	R. Lovatt Reade	694	50.8	N/A
Liberal	P. Goldschmidt*	671	49.2	N/A
Majority		23	1.6	N/A
Turnout		1,365		
Conservative gain from Liberal		Swing		

==== November 1874 ====
1874
Party	Candidate	Votes	%	±%
Liberal	J. Spencer	585	52.7	+3.5
Conservative	R. Lovatt Reade	526	47.5	−3.5
Majority		59	5.4	
Turnout		1,111		
Liberal gain from Conservative		Swing		

==== November 1875 ====
1875
Party	Candidate	Votes	%	±%
Conservative	J. Waterhouse*	uncontested		
Conservative hold		Swing		

==== November 1876 ====
1876
Party	Candidate	Votes	%	±%
Liberal	P. Goldschmidt*	uncontested		
Liberal hold		Swing		

==== November 1877 ====
1877
Party	Candidate	Votes	%	±%
Liberal	J. Spencer*	uncontested		
Liberal hold		Swing		

==== November 1878 ====
1878
Party	Candidate	Votes	%	±%
Conservative	W. T. Windsor*	uncontested		
Conservative hold		Swing		

==== November 1879 ====
1879
Party	Candidate	Votes	%	±%
Liberal	P. Goldschmidt*	uncontested		
Liberal hold		Swing		

=== Elections in 1880s ===
==== November 1880 ====
1880
Party	Candidate	Votes	%	±%
Liberal	A. E. Lloyd	uncontested		
Liberal hold		Swing		

==== November 1881 ====
1881
Party	Candidate	Votes	%	±%
Conservative	W. T. Windsor*	uncontested		
Conservative hold		Swing		

==== November 1882 ====
1882
Party	Candidate	Votes	%	±%
Liberal	P. Goldschmidt*	uncontested		
Liberal hold		Swing		

==== November 1883 ====
1883
Party	Candidate	Votes	%	±%
Liberal	A. E. Lloyd*	uncontested		
Liberal hold		Swing		

==== November 1884 ====
1884
Party	Candidate	Votes	%	±%
Conservative	W. T. Windsor*	uncontested		
Conservative hold		Swing		

==== November 1885 ====
1885
Party	Candidate	Votes	%	±%
Liberal	A. Murray*	uncontested		
Liberal hold		Swing		

==== November 1886 ====
1886
Party	Candidate	Votes	%	±%
Liberal	A. E. Lloyd*	uncontested		
Liberal hold		Swing		

==== November 1887 ====
1887
Party	Candidate	Votes	%	±%
Conservative	W. T. Windsor*	uncontested		
Conservative hold		Swing		

==== August 1888 (by-election) ====
By-election: 7 August 1888
Party	Candidate	Votes	%	±%
Conservative	H. Samson	uncontested		
Conservative hold		Swing		

==== November 1888 ====
1888
Party	Candidate	Votes	%	±%
Liberal Unionist	A. Murray*	uncontested		
Liberal Unionist hold		Swing		

==== November 1889 ====
1889
Party	Candidate	Votes	%	±%
Liberal	A. E. Lloyd*	uncontested		
Liberal hold		Swing		

=== Elections in 1890s ===
==== November 1890 ====
1890
Party	Candidate	Votes	%	±%
Conservative	H. Samson*	uncontested		
Conservative hold		Swing		

==== November 1891 ====
1891
Party	Candidate	Votes	%	±%
Liberal Unionist	A. Murray*	uncontested		
Liberal Unionist hold		Swing		

==== April 1892 (by-election) ====
By-election: 13 April 1892
Party	Candidate	Votes	%	±%
Liberal	H. J. Goldschmidt	uncontested		
Liberal hold		Swing		

==== November 1892 ====
1892
Party	Candidate	Votes	%	±%
Liberal	H. J. Goldschmidt*	uncontested		
Liberal hold		Swing		

==== November 1893 ====
1893
Party	Candidate	Votes	%	±%
Conservative	H. Samson*	uncontested		
Conservative hold		Swing		

==== November 1894 ====
1894
Party	Candidate	Votes	%	±%
Liberal Unionist	A. Murray*	uncontested		
Liberal Unionist hold		Swing		

==== November 1895 ====
1895
Party	Candidate	Votes	%	±%
Liberal	H. J. Goldschmidt*	uncontested		
Liberal hold		Swing		

==== November 1896 ====
1896
Party	Candidate	Votes	%	±%
Conservative	H. Samson*	uncontested		
Conservative hold		Swing		

==== November 1897 ====
1897
Party	Candidate	Votes	%	±%
Conservative	T. T. Shann	411	62.1	N/A
Liberal	T. A. Bazley	251	37.9	N/A
Majority		160	24.2	N/A
Turnout		662		
Conservative gain from Liberal Unionist		Swing		

==== November 1898 ====
1898
Party	Candidate	Votes	%	±%
Liberal	H. J. Goldschmidt*	uncontested		
Liberal hold		Swing		

==== November 1899 ====
1899
Party	Candidate	Votes	%	±%
Conservative	H. Samson*	uncontested		
Conservative hold		Swing		

=== Elections in 1900s ===
==== November 1900 ====
1900
Party	Candidate	Votes	%	±%
Conservative	T. T. Shann*	uncontested		
Conservative hold		Swing		

==== November 1901 ====
1901
Party	Candidate	Votes	%	±%
Liberal	H. J. Goldschmidt*	uncontested		
Liberal hold		Swing		

==== November 1902 ====
1902
Party	Candidate	Votes	%	±%
Conservative	H. Samson*	uncontested		
Conservative hold		Swing		

==== November 1903 ====
1903
Party	Candidate	Votes	%	±%
Conservative	T. T. Shann*	uncontested		
Conservative hold		Swing		

==== November 1904 ====
1904
Party	Candidate	Votes	%	±%
Liberal	H. J. Goldschmidt*	uncontested		
Liberal hold		Swing		

==== November 1905 ====
1905
Party	Candidate	Votes	%	±%
Conservative	H. Samson*	uncontested		
Conservative hold		Swing		

==== June 1906 (by-election) ====
By-election: 18 June 1906
Party	Candidate	Votes	%	±%
Liberal	E. Holt	uncontested		
Liberal hold		Swing		

==== November 1906 ====
1906
Party	Candidate	Votes	%	±%
Conservative	T. T. Shann*	uncontested		
Conservative hold		Swing		

==== January 1907 (by-election) ====
By-election: 17 January 1907
Party	Candidate	Votes	%	±%
Conservative	S. W. Royse	uncontested		
Conservative hold		Swing		

==== November 1907 ====
1907
Party	Candidate	Votes	%	±%
Conservative	A. H. Megson	431	62.1	N/A
Liberal	E. Holt*	263	37.9	N/A
Majority		168	24.2	N/A
Turnout		694		
Conservative gain from Liberal		Swing		

==== November 1908 ====
1908
Party	Candidate	Votes	%	±%
Conservative	S. W. Royse*	364	59.6	−2.5
Liberal	C. W. Naismith	247	40.4	+2.5
Majority		117	19.2	−5.0
Turnout		611		
Conservative hold		Swing		

==== November 1909 ====
1909
Party	Candidate	Votes	%	±%
Conservative	T. T. Shann*	uncontested		
Conservative hold		Swing		

=== Elections in 1910s ===
==== November 1910 ====
1910
Party	Candidate	Votes	%	±%
Conservative	A. H. Megson*	325	56.0	N/A
Liberal	W. Thomson	255	44.0	N/A
Majority		70	12.0	N/A
Turnout		580		
Conservative hold		Swing		

==== November 1911 ====
1911
Party	Candidate	Votes	%	±%
Conservative	S. W. Royse*	uncontested		
Conservative hold		Swing		

==== November 1911 (by-election) ====
By-election: 21 November 1911
Party	Candidate	Votes	%	±%
Conservative	J. Hislop	365	59.0	N/A
Liberal	K. T. S. Dockray	254	41.0	N/A
Majority		111	18.0	N/A
Turnout		619	70.4	
Conservative hold		Swing		

==== November 1912 ====
1912
Party	Candidate	Votes	%	±%
Conservative	J. Hislop*	319	51.2	N/A
Liberal	W. Thomson	304	48.8	N/A
Majority		15	2.4	N/A
Turnout		623		
Conservative hold		Swing		

==== November 1913 ====
1913
Party	Candidate	Votes	%	±%
Conservative	A. H. Megson*	311	50.8	−0.4
Liberal	W. Thomson	301	49.2	+0.4
Majority		10	1.6	−0.8
Turnout		612		
Conservative hold		Swing		

==== November 1914 ====
1914
Party	Candidate	Votes	%	±%
Conservative	S. W. Royse*	uncontested		
Conservative hold		Swing		

== See also ==
- Manchester City Council
- Manchester City Council elections
