= St. Ann's (Manchester ward) =

- Ward
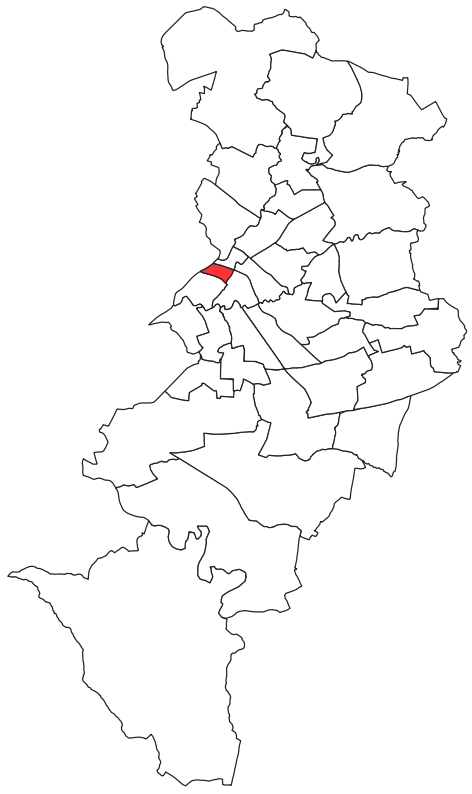
- St. Ann's ward (1931) within Manchester

- Coat of arms
- Country: United Kingdom
- Constituent country: England
- Region: North West England
- County borough: Manchester
- Created: December 1838
- Named for: St. Ann's

Government
  - Type: Unicameral
  - Body: Manchester City Council
- UK Parliamentary Constituency: Manchester Exchange

St. Ann's was an electoral division of Manchester City Council which was represented from 1838 until 1950. It covered part of Manchester city centre surrounding St. Ann's Square.

== Overview ==
St. Ann's ward was one of the fifteen municipal wards created in 1838, when the Manchester Borough Council was granted a Charter of Incorporation under the provisions of the Municipal Corporations Act 1835.

Initially, the ward's boundaries corresponded with those of District No.9 (St. Ann's) of the Manchester Township, which covered the area around St. Ann's Square in Manchester city centre. Its original boundaries remained in place until 1919 when an area to the south of St. Mary's Gate was transferred to the ward from the Exchange ward. In 1950, the ward was abolished, and its area became part of the new St. Peter's ward.

From 1838 until 1885, the ward formed part of the Manchester Parliamentary constituency. From 1885 until 1918, it was part of the Manchester North West Parliamentary constituency. From 1918 until its abolition, it was part of the Manchester Exchange Parliamentary constituency.

== Councillors ==
Election	Councillor	Councillor	Councillor
1838	Henry Newbery (Lib)	John Herford (Lib)	John Edward Taylor (Lib)
1839	Henry Newbery (Lib)	John Herford (Lib)	John Edward Taylor (Lib)
1840	Henry Newbery (Lib)	John Herford (Lib)	John Edward Taylor (Lib)
1841	James Bancroft (Lib)	John Herford (Lib)	John Edward Taylor (Lib)
1842	James Bancroft (Lib)	John Herford (Lib)	John Edward Taylor (Lib)
1843	James Bancroft (Lib)	John Herford (Lib)	John Edward Taylor (Lib)
1844	John Shawcross (Lib)	John Herford (Lib)	Jeremiah Garnett (Lib)
1845	John Shawcross (Lib)	John Herford (Lib)	William Henry Wood (Lib)
(1845–1872)
1872	W. E. Hodgkinson (Lib)	J. Fox Turner (Lib)	T. Baker (Lib)
1873	W. E. Hodgkinson (Lib)	J. Fox Turner (Lib)	T. Baker (Lib)
1874	J. A. Birch (Con)	J. Fox Turner (Lib)	T. Baker (Lib)
1875	J. A. Birch (Con)	J. Fox Turner (Lib)	T. Rose (Con)
1876	J. A. Birch (Con)	J. Fox Turner (Lib)	T. Rose (Con)
1877	J. A. Birch (Con)	J. Mark (Lib)	T. Rose (Con)
1878	J. A. Birch (Con)	J. Mark (Lib)	T. Rose (Con)
1879	J. A. Birch (Con)	J. Mark (Lib)	T. Rose (Con)
1880	J. A. Birch (Con)	J. Mark (Lib)	T. Rose (Con)
1881	J. A. Birch (Con)	J. Mark (Lib)	T. Rose (Con)
1882	J. A. Birch (Con)	J. Mark (Lib)	T. Rose (Con)
1883	J. D. Milne (Lib)	J. Mark (Lib)	T. Rose (Con)
1884	J. D. Milne (Lib)	J. Mark (Lib)	T. Rose (Con)
1885	J. D. Milne (Lib)	J. Mark (Lib)	T. Rose (Con)
July 1886	J. D. Milne (Lib U)	J. Mark (Lib U)	A. G. Copeland (Con)
1886	J. D. Milne (Lib U)	J. Mark (Lib U)	A. G. Copeland (Con)
1887	J. D. Milne (Lib U)	J. Mark (Lib U)	A. G. Copeland (Con)
1888	J. D. Milne (Lib U)	J. Mark (Lib U)	A. G. Copeland (Con)
1889	J. D. Milne (Lib U)	J. Mark (Lib U)	A. G. Copeland (Con)
November 1889	J. D. Milne (Lib U)	W. H. Vaudrey (Con)	A. G. Copeland (Con)
1890	J. D. Milne (Lib U)	W. H. Vaudrey (Con)	A. G. Copeland (Con)
1891	J. D. Milne (Lib U)	W. H. Vaudrey (Con)	A. G. Copeland (Con)
1892	J. Fildes (Con)	W. H. Vaudrey (Con)	A. G. Copeland (Con)
1893	J. Fildes (Con)	W. H. Vaudrey (Con)	A. G. Copeland (Con)
1894	J. Fildes (Con)	W. H. Vaudrey (Con)	A. G. Copeland (Con)
1895	J. Fildes (Con)	W. H. Vaudrey (Con)	A. G. Copeland (Con)
1896	J. Fildes (Con)	W. H. Vaudrey (Con)	A. G. Copeland (Con)
1897	J. Fildes (Con)	W. H. Vaudrey (Con)	A. G. Copeland (Con)
1898	J. Fildes (Con)	W. H. Vaudrey (Con)	A. G. Copeland (Con)
February 1899	J. Fildes (Con)	W. H. Vaudrey (Con)	C. W. Botsford (Con)
1899	J. Fildes (Con)	W. H. Vaudrey (Con)	C. W. Botsford (Con)
1900	J. Fildes (Con)	W. H. Vaudrey (Con)	C. W. Botsford (Con)
1901	J. Fildes (Con)	W. H. Vaudrey (Con)	C. W. Botsford (Con)
1902	J. Fildes (Con)	W. H. Vaudrey (Con)	C. W. Botsford (Con)
December 1902	J. Fildes (Con)	R. G. Lawson (Lib)	C. W. Botsford (Con)
1903	J. Fildes (Con)	R. G. Lawson (Lib)	C. W. Botsford (Con)
1904	J. Fildes (Con)	R. G. Lawson (Lib)	C. W. Botsford (Con)
1905	J. Fildes (Con)	R. G. Lawson (Lib)	G. Heathcote (Lib)
1906	J. Fildes (Con)	T. C. Abbott (Lib)	G. Heathcote (Lib)
April 1907	T. Stephens (Lib)	T. C. Abbott (Lib)	G. Heathcote (Lib)
1907	J. Burgess (Con)	T. C. Abbott (Lib)	G. Heathcote (Lib)
1908	J. Burgess (Con)	T. C. Abbott (Lib)	A. Porter (Lib)
1909	J. Burgess (Con)	J. G. Litton (Con)	A. Porter (Lib)
1910	J. Burgess (Con)	J. G. Litton (Con)	A. Porter (Lib)
1911	J. Burgess (Con)	J. G. Litton (Con)	A. Porter (Lib)
1912	J. Burgess (Con)	J. G. Litton (Con)	A. Porter (Lib)
1913	F. M. S. Grant (Con)	J. G. Litton (Con)	A. Porter (Lib)
1914	F. M. S. Grant (Con)	J. G. Litton (Con)	A. Porter (Lib)
1919	F. M. S. Grant (Con)	J. G. Litton (Con)	A. Porter (Lib)
1920	F. M. S. Grant (Con)	J. G. Litton (Con)	A. Porter (Lib)
1921	F. M. S. Grant (Con)	J. G. Litton (Con)	E. B. Beesley (Con)
May 1922	R. A. Larmuth (Con)	J. G. Litton (Con)	E. B. Beesley (Con)
1922	R. A. Larmuth (Con)	J. G. Litton (Con)	E. B. Beesley (Con)
1923	R. A. Larmuth (Con)	J. G. Litton (Con)	E. B. Beesley (Con)
February 1924	R. A. Larmuth (Con)	E. Green (Con)	E. B. Beesley (Con)
1924	R. A. Larmuth (Con)	E. Green (Con)	C. F. Brierley (Con)
1925	R. A. Larmuth (Con)	E. Green (Con)	C. F. Brierley (Con)
1926	R. A. Larmuth (Con)	E. Green (Con)	C. F. Brierley (Con)
1927	R. A. Larmuth (Con)	E. Green (Con)	C. F. Brierley (Con)
1928	R. A. Larmuth (Con)	E. Green (Con)	C. F. Brierley (Con)
1929	R. A. Larmuth (Con)	E. Green (Con)	C. F. Brierley (Con)
1930	R. A. Larmuth (Con)	E. Green (Con)	W. Challoner (Con)
1931	R. A. Larmuth (Con)	E. Green (Con)	W. Challoner (Con)
1932	R. A. Larmuth (Con)	E. Green (Con)	W. Challoner (Con)
1933	R. A. Larmuth (Con)	E. Green (Con)	W. Challoner (Con)
1934	R. A. Larmuth (Con)	E. Green (Con)	W. Challoner (Con)
1935	R. A. Larmuth (Con)	E. Green (Con)	W. Challoner (Con)
1936	R. A. Larmuth (Con)	E. Green (Con)	W. Challoner (Con)
July 1937	R. A. Larmuth (Con)	E. Green (Con)	W. J. Pegge(Con)
1937	R. A. Larmuth (Con)	E. Green (Con)	W. J. Pegge (Con)
1938	R. A. Larmuth (Con)	E. Green (Con)	W. J. Pegge (Con)
1945	H. Marshall (Con)	W. Challoner (Con)	W. J. Pegge (Con)
1946	H. Marshall (Con)	D. Gosling (Con)	W. J. Pegge (Con)
1947	H. Marshall (Con)	D. Gosling (Con)	W. J. Pegge (Con)
1949	H. Marshall (Con)	D. Gosling (Con)	W. J. Pegge (Con)

== Elections ==
=== Elections in 1830s ===
==== December 1838 ====
1838 (3 vacancies)
Party	Candidate	Votes	%	±%
Liberal	Henry Newbery	193	100.0	
Liberal	John Herford	193	100.0	
Liberal	John Edward Taylor	192	99.5	
Turnout		193		
Liberal win (new seat)				
Liberal win (new seat)				
Liberal win (new seat)				

==== November 1839 ====
1839
Party	Candidate	Votes	%	±%
Liberal	John Edward Taylor*	uncontested		
Liberal hold		Swing		

=== Elections in 1840s ===
==== November 1840 ====
1840
Party	Candidate	Votes	%	±%
Liberal	John Herford*	uncontested		
Liberal hold		Swing		

==== November 1841 ====
1841
Party	Candidate	Votes	%	±%
Liberal	James Bancroft	uncontested		
Liberal hold		Swing		

==== November 1842 ====
1842
Party	Candidate	Votes	%	±%
Liberal	John Edward Taylor*	uncontested		
Liberal hold		Swing		

==== November 1843 ====
1843
Party	Candidate	Votes	%	±%
Liberal	John Herford*	uncontested		
Liberal hold		Swing		

==== November 1844 ====
1844
Party	Candidate	Votes	%	±%
Liberal	John Shawcross	uncontested		
Liberal hold		Swing		

==== November 1845 ====
1845
Party	Candidate	Votes	%	±%
Liberal	William Henry Wood	uncontested		
Liberal hold		Swing		

=== Elections in 1870s ===
==== November 1872 ====
1872
Party	Candidate	Votes	%	±%
Liberal	T. Baker*	476	70.0	
Conservative	J. E. Middlehurst	204	30.0	
Majority		272	40.0	
Turnout		680		
Liberal hold		Swing		

==== November 1873 ====
1873
Party	Candidate	Votes	%	±%
Liberal	J. Fox Turner*	489	63.3	−6.7
Conservative	J. F. Milne	283	36.7	+6.7
Majority		206	26.6	−13.4
Turnout		772		
Liberal hold		Swing		

==== November 1874 ====
1874
Party	Candidate	Votes	%	±%
Conservative	J. A. Birch*	482	54.5	+17.8
Liberal	J. Mark	402	45.5	−17.8
Majority		80	9.0	
Turnout		884		
Conservative hold		Swing		

==== November 1875 ====
1875
Party	Candidate	Votes	%	±%
Conservative	T. Rose*	uncontested		
Conservative hold		Swing		

==== November 1876 ====
1876
Party	Candidate	Votes	%	±%
Liberal	J. Fox Turner*	uncontested		
Liberal hold		Swing		

==== November 1877 ====
1877
Party	Candidate	Votes	%	±%
Conservative	J. A. Birch*	uncontested		
Conservative hold		Swing		

==== November 1878 ====
1878
Party	Candidate	Votes	%	±%
Conservative	T. Rose*	uncontested		
Conservative hold		Swing		

==== November 1879 ====
1879
Party	Candidate	Votes	%	±%
Liberal	J. Mark*	uncontested		
Liberal hold		Swing		

=== Elections in 1880s ===
==== November 1880 ====
1880
Party	Candidate	Votes	%	±%
Conservative	J. A. Birch*	uncontested		
Conservative hold		Swing		

==== November 1881 ====
1881
Party	Candidate	Votes	%	±%
Conservative	T. Rose*	uncontested		
Conservative hold		Swing		

==== November 1882 ====
1882
Party	Candidate	Votes	%	±%
Liberal	J. Mark*	uncontested		
Liberal hold		Swing		

==== November 1883 ====
1883
Party	Candidate	Votes	%	±%
Liberal	J. D. Milne	uncontested		
Liberal gain from Conservative		Swing		

==== November 1884 ====
1884
Party	Candidate	Votes	%	±%
Conservative	T. Rose*	uncontested		
Conservative hold		Swing		

==== November 1885 ====
1885
Party	Candidate	Votes	%	±%
Liberal	J. Mark*	uncontested		
Liberal hold		Swing		

==== July 1886 (by-election) ====
By-election: 19 July 1886
Party	Candidate	Votes	%	±%
Conservative	A. G. Copeland	uncontested		
Conservative hold		Swing		

==== November 1886 ====
1886
Party	Candidate	Votes	%	±%
Liberal Unionist	J. D. Milne*	uncontested		
Liberal Unionist hold		Swing		

==== November 1887 ====
1887
Party	Candidate	Votes	%	±%
Conservative	A. G. Copeland*	uncontested		
Conservative hold		Swing		

==== November 1888 ====
1888
Party	Candidate	Votes	%	±%
Liberal Unionist	J. Mark*	uncontested		
Liberal Unionist hold		Swing		

==== November 1889 ====
1889
Party	Candidate	Votes	%	±%
Liberal Unionist	J. D. Milne*	uncontested		
Liberal Unionist hold		Swing		

==== November 1889 (by-election) ====
By-election: 4 November 1889
Party	Candidate	Votes	%	±%
Conservative	W. H. Vaudrey	uncontested		
Conservative hold		Swing		

=== Elections in 1890s ===
==== November 1890 ====
1890
Party	Candidate	Votes	%	±%
Conservative	A. G. Copeland*	uncontested		
Conservative hold		Swing		

==== November 1891 ====
1891
Party	Candidate	Votes	%	±%
Conservative	W. H. Vaudrey*	597	54.1	N/A
Liberal	E. Holt	507	45.9	N/A
Majority		90	8.2	N/A
Turnout		1,104		
Conservative hold		Swing		

==== November 1892 ====
1892
Party	Candidate	Votes	%	±%
Conservative	J. Fildes	695	67.9	+13.9
Liberal	J. H. Boydell	328	32.1	−13.8
Majority		367	35.8	+27.6
Turnout		1,023		
Conservative gain from Liberal Unionist		Swing		

==== November 1893 ====
1893
Party	Candidate	Votes	%	±%
Conservative	A. G. Copeland*	uncontested		
Conservative hold		Swing		

==== November 1894 ====
1894
Party	Candidate	Votes	%	±%
Conservative	W. H. Vaudrey*	uncontested		
Conservative hold		Swing		

==== November 1895 ====
1895
Party	Candidate	Votes	%	±%
Conservative	J. Fildes*	uncontested		
Conservative hold		Swing		

==== November 1896 ====
1896
Party	Candidate	Votes	%	±%
Conservative	A. G. Copeland*	uncontested		
Conservative hold		Swing		

==== November 1897 ====
1897
Party	Candidate	Votes	%	±%
Conservative	W. H. Vaudrey*	689	74.4	N/A
Liberal	J. Bowie	237	25.6	N/A
Majority		452	48.8	N/A
Turnout		926		
Conservative hold		Swing		

==== November 1898 ====
1898
Party	Candidate	Votes	%	±%
Conservative	J. Fildes*	uncontested		
Conservative hold		Swing		

==== February 1899 (by-election) ====
By-election: 20 February 1899
Party	Candidate	Votes	%	±%
Conservative	C. W. Botsford	uncontested		
Conservative hold		Swing		

==== November 1899 ====
1899
Party	Candidate	Votes	%	±%
Conservative	C. W. Botsford*	uncontested		
Conservative hold		Swing		

=== Elections in 1900s ===
==== November 1900 ====
1900
Party	Candidate	Votes	%	±%
Conservative	W. H. Vaudrey*	uncontested		
Conservative hold		Swing		

==== November 1901 ====
1901
Party	Candidate	Votes	%	±%
Conservative	J. Fildes*	uncontested		
Conservative hold		Swing		

==== November 1902 ====
1902
Party	Candidate	Votes	%	±%
Conservative	C. W. Botsford*	uncontested		
Conservative hold		Swing		

==== December 1902 (by-election) ====
By-election: 1 December 1902
Party	Candidate	Votes	%	±%
Liberal	R. G. Lawson	549	50.9	N/A
Conservative	P. Woodhouse	498	46.2	N/A
Independent	T. Cook	32	2.9	N/A
Majority		51	4.7	N/A
Turnout		1,079		
Liberal gain from Conservative		Swing		

==== November 1903 ====
1903
Party	Candidate	Votes	%	±%
Liberal	R. G. Lawson*	uncontested		
Liberal hold		Swing		

==== November 1904 ====
1904
Party	Candidate	Votes	%	±%
Conservative	J. Fildes*	uncontested		
Conservative hold		Swing		

==== November 1905 ====
1905
Party	Candidate	Votes	%	±%
Liberal	G. Heathcote	431	52.0	N/A
Conservative	G. Dodson*	398	48.0	N/A
Majority		33	4.0	N/A
Turnout		829		
Liberal gain from Conservative		Swing		

==== November 1906 ====
1906
Party	Candidate	Votes	%	±%
Liberal	T. C. Abbott*	uncontested		
Liberal hold		Swing		

==== April 1907 (by-election) ====
By-election: 3 April 1907
Party	Candidate	Votes	%	±%
Liberal	T. Stephens	458	53.8	N/A
Conservative	J. Earnshaw	394	46.2	N/A
Majority		64	7.6	N/A
Turnout		852		
Liberal gain from Conservative		Swing		

==== November 1907 ====
1907
Party	Candidate	Votes	%	±%
Conservative	J. Burgess	531	46.0	N/A
Liberal	T. Stephens*	494	42.8	N/A
Independent	E. Jones	130	11.2	N/A
Majority		37	3.2	N/A
Turnout		1,155		
Conservative gain from Liberal		Swing		

==== November 1908 ====
1908
Party	Candidate	Votes	%	±%
Liberal	A. Porter	587	50.1	+7.3
Conservative	G. King	585	49.9	+3.9
Majority		2	0.2	−3.0
Turnout		1,172		
Liberal hold		Swing		

==== November 1909 ====
1909
Party	Candidate	Votes	%	±%
Conservative	J. G. Litton	588	50.5	+0.6
Liberal	T. C. Abbott*	576	49.5	−0.6
Majority		12	1.0	
Turnout		1,164		
Conservative gain from Liberal		Swing		

=== Elections in 1910s ===
==== November 1910 ====
1910
Party	Candidate	Votes	%	±%
Conservative	J. Burgess*	uncontested		
Conservative hold		Swing		

==== November 1911 ====
1911
Party	Candidate	Votes	%	±%
Liberal	A. Porter*	630	54.5	N/A
Conservative	J. M. Elliott	525	45.5	N/A
Majority		105	9.0	N/A
Turnout		1,155		
Liberal hold		Swing		

==== November 1912 ====
1912
Party	Candidate	Votes	%	±%
Conservative	J. G. Litton*	uncontested		
Conservative hold		Swing		

==== November 1913 ====
1913
Party	Candidate	Votes	%	±%
Conservative	F. M. S. Grant	578	52.9	N/A
Liberal	W. Butterworth	515	47.1	N/A
Majority		63	5.8	N/A
Turnout		1,093		
Conservative hold		Swing		

==== November 1914 ====
1914
Party	Candidate	Votes	%	±%
Liberal	A. Porter*	uncontested		
Liberal hold		Swing		

==== November 1919 ====
1919 (new boundaries)
Party	Candidate	Votes	%	±%
Conservative	J. G. Litton*	uncontested		
Conservative hold		Swing		

=== Elections in 1920s ===
==== November 1920 ====
1920
Party	Candidate	Votes	%	±%
Conservative	F. M. S. Grant*	uncontested		
Conservative hold		Swing		

==== November 1921 ====
1921
Party	Candidate	Votes	%	±%
Conservative	E. B. Beesley	649	54.5	N/A
Independent	R. B. Batty	542	45.5	N/A
Majority		107	9.0	N/A
Turnout		1,191	49.3	N/A
Conservative gain from Liberal		Swing		

==== May 1922 (by-election) ====
By-election: 16 May 1922
Party	Candidate	Votes	%	±%
Conservative	R. A. Larmuth	uncontested		
Conservative hold		Swing		

==== November 1922 ====
1922
Party	Candidate	Votes	%	±%
Conservative	J. G. Litton*	uncontested		
Conservative hold		Swing		

==== November 1923 ====
1923
Party	Candidate	Votes	%	±%
Conservative	R. A. Larmuth*	uncontested		
Conservative hold		Swing		

==== February 1924 (by-election) ====
By-election: 19 February 1924
Party	Candidate	Votes	%	±%
Conservative	E. Green	581	54.3	N/A
Independent	J. E. Balmer	489	45.7	N/A
Majority		92	8.6	N/A
Turnout		1,070	49.3	N/A
Conservative hold		Swing		

==== November 1924 ====
1924
Party	Candidate	Votes	%	±%
Conservative	C. F. Brierley	uncontested		
Conservative hold		Swing		

==== November 1925 ====
1925
Party	Candidate	Votes	%	±%
Conservative	E. Green*	736	63.2	N/A
Liberal	J. G. Haworth	428	36.8	N/A
Majority		308	26.4	N/A
Turnout		1,164	47.6	N/A
Conservative hold		Swing		

==== November 1926 ====
1926
Party	Candidate	Votes	%	±%
Conservative	R. A. Larmuth*	uncontested		
Conservative hold		Swing		

==== November 1927 ====
1927
Party	Candidate	Votes	%	±%
Conservative	C. F. Brierley*	uncontested		
Conservative hold		Swing		

==== November 1928 ====
1928
Party	Candidate	Votes	%	±%
Conservative	E. Green*	uncontested		
Conservative hold		Swing		

==== November 1929 ====
1929
Party	Candidate	Votes	%	±%
Conservative	R. A. Larmuth*	694	69.7	N/A
Liberal	A. Payne	301	30.3	N/A
Majority		393	39.4	N/A
Turnout		995	44.2	N/A
Conservative hold		Swing		

=== Elections in 1930s ===
==== November 1930 ====
1930
Party	Candidate	Votes	%	±%
Conservative	W. Challoner	566	72.5	+2.8
Liberal	A. Payne	215	27.5	−2.8
Majority		351	45.0	+5.6
Turnout		781		
Conservative hold		Swing		

==== November 1931 ====
1931
Party	Candidate	Votes	%	±%
Conservative	E. Green*	uncontested		
Conservative hold		Swing		

==== November 1932 ====
1932
Party	Candidate	Votes	%	±%
Conservative	R. A. Larmuth*	uncontested		
Conservative hold		Swing		

==== November 1933 ====
1933
Party	Candidate	Votes	%	±%
Conservative	W. Challoner*	uncontested		
Conservative hold		Swing		

==== November 1934 ====
1934
Party	Candidate	Votes	%	±%
Conservative	E. Green*	uncontested		
Conservative hold		Swing		

==== November 1935 ====
1935
Party	Candidate	Votes	%	±%
Conservative	R. A. Larmuth*	uncontested		
Conservative hold		Swing		

==== November 1936 ====
1936
Party	Candidate	Votes	%	±%
Conservative	W. Challoner*	uncontested		
Conservative hold		Swing		

==== July 1937 (by-election) ====
By-election: 22 July 1937
Party	Candidate	Votes	%	±%
Conservative	W. J. Pegge	uncontested		
Conservative hold		Swing		

==== November 1937 ====
1937
Party	Candidate	Votes	%	±%
Conservative	E. Green*	uncontested		
Conservative hold		Swing		

==== November 1938 ====
1938
Party	Candidate	Votes	%	±%
Conservative	R. A. Larmuth*	uncontested		
Conservative hold		Swing		

=== Elections in 1940s ===
==== November 1945 ====
1945 (2 vacancies)
Party	Candidate	Votes	%	±%
Conservative	W. J. Pegge*	515	90.0	N/A
Conservative	H. Marshall*	515	90.0	N/A
Labour	S. Beaven	57	10.0	N/A
Labour	N. Randolph	57	10.0	N/A
Majority		458	80.0	N/A
Turnout		572		
Conservative hold		Swing		
Conservative hold		Swing		

==== November 1946 ====
1946
Party	Candidate	Votes	%	±%
Conservative	D. Gosling	443	71.0	−19.0
Liberal	A. Bradley	156	25.0	N/A
Labour	J. Fern	25	4.0	−6.0
Majority		287	46.0	−34.0
Turnout		624		
Conservative hold		Swing		

==== November 1947 ====
1947
Party	Candidate	Votes	%	±%
Conservative	H. Marshall*	uncontested		
Conservative hold		Swing		

==== May 1949 ====
1949
Party	Candidate	Votes	%	±%
Conservative	W. J. Pegge*	uncontested		
Conservative hold		Swing		

== See also ==
- Manchester City Council
- Manchester City Council elections
