= 1964 Manchester City Council election =

UK local government election

- 7 May 1964

42 of 152 seats to Manchester City Council 77 seats needed for a majority
	First party	Second party	Third party
Party	Labour	Conservative	Liberal
Last election	26 seats, 47.5%	11 seats, 30.9%	1 seats, 19.7%
Seats before	93	50	9
Seats won	27	14	1
Seats after	96	48	8
Seat change	▲3	▼2	▼1
Popular vote	72,417	56,051	23,910
Percentage	47.0%	36.4%	15.5%
Swing	▼0.5%	▲5.5%	▼4.2%
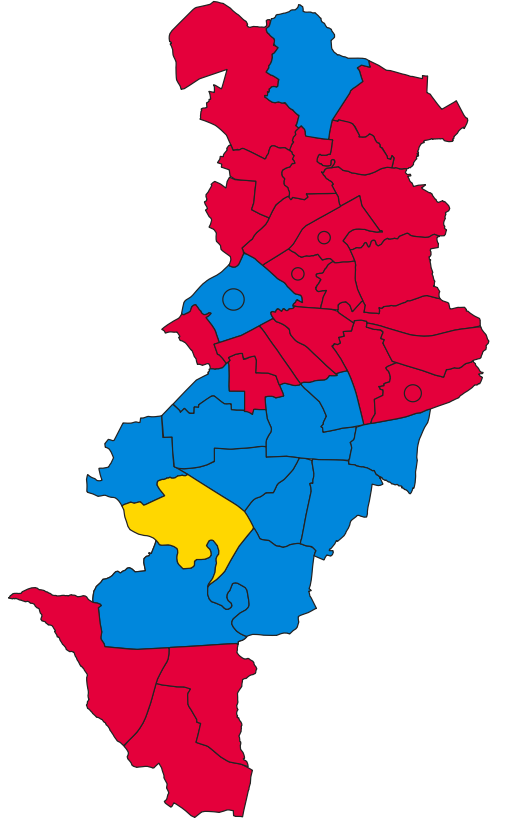
- Map of results of 1964 election
Leader of the Council before election
Labour
Leader of the Council after election
Labour

Elections to Manchester City Council were held on Thursday, 7 May 1964. One third of the councillors seats were up for election, with each successful candidate to serve a three-year term of office. The Labour Party retained overall control of the council.

== Election result ==
Party	Votes	Seats		Full Council			
Labour Party	72,417 (47.0%)	▼0.5	27 (64.3%)	27 / 42	▲3	96 (63.2%)	96 / 152
Conservative Party	56,051 (36.4%)	▲5.5	14 (33.3%)	14 / 42	▼2	48 (31.6%)	48 / 152
Liberal Party	23,910 (15.5%)	▼4.2	1 (2.4%)	1 / 42	▼1	8 (5.3%)	8 / 152
Communist	1,375 (0.9%)	▲0.1	0 (0.0%)	0 / 42	Steady	0 (0.0%)	0 / 152
Independent Labour Party	111 (0.1%)	N/A	0 (0.0%)	0 / 42	N/A	0 (0.0%)	0 / 152
Union Movement	96 (0.1%)	▼0.1	0 (0.0%)	0 / 42	Steady	0 (0.0%)	0 / 152

=== Full council ===
↓
96	8	48

=== Aldermen ===
↓
23	2	13

=== Councillors ===
↓
73	6	35

== Ward results ==
=== Alexandra Park ===
Alexandra Park
Party	Candidate	Votes	%	±%
Conservative	L. Bailey*	2,937	51.2	+0.6
Liberal	A. Whiteland	1,681	29.3	−5.4
Labour	A. Flanaghan	1,020	17.8	+4.4
Union Movement	R. J. Marsden	96	1.7	+0.3
Majority		1,256	21.9	+6.0
Turnout		5,734		
Conservative hold		Swing		

=== All Saints' ===
All Saints'
Party	Candidate	Votes	%	±%
Labour	T. Thomas*	1,014	73.5	−8.5
Conservative	R. W. Phillips	366	26.5	+8.5
Majority		648	47.0	−17.0
Turnout		1,380		
Labour hold		Swing		

=== Ardwick ===
Ardwick
Party	Candidate	Votes	%	±%
Labour	W. Parkinson*	1,475	67.0	−12.3
Conservative	J. A. Staton	726	33.0	+12.3
Majority		749	34.0	−24.6
Turnout		2,201		
Labour hold		Swing		

=== Baguley ===
Baguley
Party	Candidate	Votes	%	±%
Labour	H. Lloyd*	2,984	50.0	−2.4
Conservative	I. K. Paley	2,168	36.3	+4.9
Liberal	E. Page	818	13.7	−2.5
Majority		816	13.7	−7.4
Turnout		5,970		
Labour hold		Swing		

=== Barlow Moor ===
Barlow Moor
Party	Candidate	Votes	%	±%
Liberal	P. Jones	1,563	41.7	−3.5
Conservative	J. D. Cheetham	1,356	36.1	+3.0
Labour	G. Hayward	831	22.2	+0.5
Majority		207	5.6	−6.5
Turnout		3,750		
Liberal hold		Swing		

=== Benchill ===
Benchill
Party	Candidate	Votes	%	±%
Labour	H. Brown	2,304	46.7	−5.9
Conservative	D. L. Cooke*	2,013	40.8	+10.7
Liberal	J. Glithero	523	10.6	−5.0
Communist	M. Taylor	96	1.9	+0.2
Majority		291	5.9	−16.6
Turnout		4,936		
Labour gain from Conservative		Swing		

=== Beswick ===
Beswick
Party	Candidate	Votes	%	±%
Labour	J. Dean*	2,469	85.3	−1.4
Conservative	S. Mottram	427	14.7	+8.3
Majority		2,042	70.6	−9.2
Turnout		2,896		
Labour hold		Swing		

=== Blackley ===
Blackley
Party	Candidate	Votes	%	±%
Conservative	W. Burrows*	2,590	42.2	+1.8
Labour	A. Haslam	2,314	37.7	+1.0
Liberal	M. F. Giblin	1,154	18.8	−4.0
Communist	I. W. Luft	81	1.3	N/A
Majority		276	4.5	+0.8
Turnout		6,139		
Conservative hold		Swing		

=== Bradford ===
Bradford
Party	Candidate	Votes	%	±%
Labour	R. Massey*	2,312	72.0	−3.3
Conservative	H. J. Caulfield	753	23.4	+1.9
Communist	S. Cole	147	4.6	+1.4
Majority		1,559	48.6	−5.2
Turnout		3,212		
Labour hold		Swing		

=== Burnage ===
Burnage
Party	Candidate	Votes	%	±%
Conservative	G. Lord*	2,617	47.1	+9.7
Labour	B. Smith	1,721	31.0	+0.1
Liberal	A. T. Parkinson	1,219	21.9	−9.8
Majority		896	16.1	+10.4
Turnout		5,557		
Conservative hold		Swing		

=== Cheetham ===
Cheetham
Party	Candidate	Votes	%	±%
Labour	C. Creveul	1,385	47.4	−1.3
Liberal	M. Needoff*	1,145	39.2	0
Conservative	A. Niman	390	13.4	+1.3
Majority		240	8.2	−1.3
Turnout		2,920		
Labour gain from Liberal		Swing		

=== Chorlton-cum-Hardy ===
Chorlton-cum-Hardy
Party	Candidate	Votes	%	±%
Conservative	L. Sanders	2,786	51.1	+12.7
Liberal	J. Hartley	1,414	25.9	−5.3
Labour	J. Moore	1,254	23.0	+2.9
Majority		1,372	25.2	+18.0
Turnout		5,454		
Conservative hold		Swing		

=== Collegiate Church ===
Collegiate Church
Party	Candidate	Votes	%	±%
Labour	J. Davis*	960	77.7	−2.0
Conservative	R. J. Chronnell	176	14.2	+1.3
Communist	K. Bloch	100	8.1	+0.7
Majority		784	63.5	−3.3
Turnout		1,236		
Labour hold		Swing		

=== Crumpsall ===
Crumpsall
Party	Candidate	Votes	%	±%
Labour	F. J. Balcombe*	3,590	47.5	+6.6
Conservative	E. Taylor	2,669	35.3	+0.9
Liberal	A. F. Sullivan	1,292	17.2	−7.5
Majority		921	12.2	+5.7
Turnout		7,551		
Labour hold		Swing		

=== Didsbury ===
Didsbury
Party	Candidate	Votes	%	±%
Conservative	M. R. Crawford*	3,163	58.5	+9.2
Liberal	T. MacInerney	1,464	27.1	−9.1
Labour	H. Barrett	781	14.4	−0.1
Majority		1,699	31.4	+18.3
Turnout		5,408		
Conservative hold		Swing		

=== Gorton North ===
Gorton North
Party	Candidate	Votes	%	±%
Labour	N. Leech*	2,994	73.5	−18.5
Conservative	J. L. Traynor	838	20.6	N/A
Communist	J. Skelton	241	5.9	−2.1
Majority		2,156	52.9	−31.1
Turnout		4,072		
Labour hold		Swing		

=== Gorton South ===
Gorton South (2 vacancies)
Party	Candidate	Votes	%	±%
Labour	H. J. Batson*	1,685	70.3	+3.5
Labour	G. Conquest	1,489	62.1	−4.7
Liberal	W. M. Drape	893	37.2	+4.0
Conservative	J. K. McGregor	729	30.4	N/A
Majority		596	24.9	−8.7
Turnout		2,398		
Labour hold		Swing		
Labour hold		Swing		

=== Harpurhey ===
Harpurhey
Party	Candidate	Votes	%	±%
Labour	H. Waddicor*	1,994	62.8	−4.7
Conservative	J. Egan	1,179	37.2	+4.7
Majority		815	25.6	−9.4
Turnout		3,173		
Labour hold		Swing		

=== Hugh Oldham ===
Hugh Oldham
Party	Candidate	Votes	%	±%
Labour	A. Nicholson*	786	81.4	−5.2
Conservative	T. E. Murphy	180	18.6	+5.2
Majority		606	62.8	−10.4
Turnout		966		
Labour hold		Swing		

=== Levenshulme ===
Levenshulme
Party	Candidate	Votes	%	±%
Conservative	A. Williamson	2,204	45.0	+0.8
Labour	J. T. Morgan	1,815	37.0	−2.6
Liberal	G. S. Norris	883	18.0	+1.8
Majority		389	8.0	+3.4
Turnout		4,902		
Conservative hold		Swing		

=== Lightbowne ===
Lightbowne
Party	Candidate	Votes	%	±%
Labour	K. Franklin*	2,700	46.1	+3.6
Conservative	A. Tetlow	2,080	35.5	+2.2
Liberal	H. Roche	1,080	18.4	−5.8
Majority		620	10.6	+1.4
Turnout		5,860		
Labour hold		Swing		

=== Longsight ===
Longsight
Party	Candidate	Votes	%	±%
Conservative	J. G. Hopkins*	1,902	53.9	+6.1
Labour	M. Johnson	1,014	28.7	−10.1
Liberal	F. N. Wedlock	350	9.9	−0.5
Communist	H. Johnson	261	7.5	+5.0
Majority		888	25.2	+15.2
Turnout		3,527		
Conservative hold		Swing		

=== Miles Platting ===
Miles Platting (2 vacancies)
Party	Candidate	Votes	%	±%
Labour	H. W. Bliss	1,392	64.2	−5.1
Labour	J. S. Goldstone	1,364	62.9	−6.4
Conservative	G. Fildes	792	36.5	+5.8
Conservative	C. Warburton	787	36.3	+5.6
Majority		572	26.4	−12.2
Turnout		2,168		
Labour hold		Swing		

=== Moss Side East ===
Moss Side East
Party	Candidate	Votes	%	±%
Labour	H. P. D. Paget	1,740	53.1	+1.4
Conservative	P. Whitby*	1,298	39.5	+1.5
Liberal	M. A. G. Hatton	243	7.4	−2.8
Majority		442	13.1	−0.1
Turnout		3,281		
Labour gain from Conservative		Swing		

=== Moss Side West ===
Moss Side West
Party	Candidate	Votes	%	±%
Conservative	P. Buckley*	1,789	47.8	+7.3
Labour	R. E. Talbot	1,576	42.1	+9.3
Liberal	S. Rose	290	7.8	−10.9
Communist	E. Foster	86	2.3	+0.4
Majority		213	5.7	−2.0
Turnout		3,741		
Conservative hold		Swing		

=== Moston ===
Moston
Party	Candidate	Votes	%	±%
Labour	G. Halstead*	2,419	44.2	−6.6
Conservative	F. Mountfield	2,020	36.9	+10.5
Liberal	J. Bulmer	1,034	18.9	+1.7
Majority		399	7.3	−17.1
Turnout		5,473		
Labour hold		Swing		

=== New Cross ===
New Cross (2 vacancies)
Party	Candidate	Votes	%	±%
Labour	C. Blackwell*	1,134	78.3	−3.9
Labour	E. Donoghue	1,096	75.7	−6.5
Conservative	P. Thornley	333	23.0	+5.2
Majority		763	52.7	−11.7
Turnout		1,448		
Labour hold		Swing		
Labour hold		Swing		

=== Newton Heath ===
Newton Heath
Party	Candidate	Votes	%	±%
Labour	A. Logan*	2,075	64.9	+13.2
Conservative	P. B. Walker	584	18.3	−3.5
Liberal	R. Jackson	426	13.3	−10.8
Communist	J. B. Cross	113	3.5	+1.1
Majority		1,491	46.6	+19.0
Turnout		3,198		
Labour hold		Swing		

=== Northenden ===
Northenden
Party	Candidate	Votes	%	±%
Conservative	G. Leigh*	2,912	41.0	+13.5
Labour	D. Healey	2,750	38.8	−0.7
Liberal	M. Allen	1,427	20.2	−12.8
Majority		162	2.2	
Turnout		7,089		
Conservative hold		Swing		

=== Old Moat ===
Old Moat
Party	Candidate	Votes	%	±%
Conservative	T. F. Lavin	1,674	36.7	+3.8
Labour	E. Wood	1,591	34.9	+1.0
Liberal	A. Yates	1,294	28.4	−5.2
Majority		83	1.8	
Turnout		4,559		
Conservative hold		Swing		

=== Openshaw ===
Openshaw
Party	Candidate	Votes	%	±%
Labour	P. J. Donoghue*	2,691	69.0	−7.6
Conservative	E. Eccles	1,061	27.2	+7.0
Communist	H. Holland	148	3.8	+0.5
Majority		1,630	41.8	−14.6
Turnout		3,900		
Labour hold		Swing		

=== Rusholme ===
Rusholme
Party	Candidate	Votes	%	±%
Conservative	H. Stockdale*	1,961	49.2	+1.8
Labour	J. L. Shelmerdine	1,172	29.4	+1.0
Liberal	M. D. Howard	852	21.4	−2.8
Majority		789	19.8	+0.8
Turnout		3,985		
Conservative hold		Swing		

=== St. George's ===
St. George's
Party	Candidate	Votes	%	±%
Labour	E. Mellor*	1,383	80.4	+1.6
Conservative	C. J. Catarall	337	19.6	−1.6
Majority		1,046	60.8	+3.2
Turnout		1,720		
Labour hold		Swing		

=== St. Luke's ===
St. Luke's
Party	Candidate	Votes	%	±%
Labour	S. Rimmer*	1,501	68.6	+5.5
Conservative	M. E. Ford	688	31.4	−5.5
Majority		813	37.2	+11.0
Turnout		2,189		
Labour hold		Swing		

=== St. Mark's ===
St. Mark's
Party	Candidate	Votes	%	±%
Labour	W. Shaw*	2,259	76.9	+1.5
Conservative	I. Goslin	677	23.1	+3.5
Majority		1,582	53.8	−2.0
Turnout		2,936		
Labour hold		Swing		

=== St. Peter's ===
St. Peter's (2 vacancies)
Party	Candidate	Votes	%	±%
Conservative	N. G. Westbrook*	971	80.6	+6.0
Conservative	T. Baron	926	76.9	+2.3
Labour	T. Richardson	255	21.2	−4.2
Majority		671	55.7	+6.5
Turnout		1,204		
Conservative hold		Swing		
Conservative hold		Swing		

=== Withington ===
Withington
Party	Candidate	Votes	%	±%
Conservative	W. Crabtree	2,242	45.7	+3.3
Liberal	A. Angel	2,077	42.4	+1.4
Labour	W. J. Shaw	582	11.9	−4.7
Majority		165	3.3	+1.9
Turnout		4,901		
Conservative hold		Swing		

=== Woodhouse Park ===
Woodhouse Park
Party	Candidate	Votes	%	±%
Labour	W. Smith*	2,825	61.7	−1.9
Liberal	K. Hamnett	788	17.2	−6.3
Conservative	E. McDonald	750	16.4	+6.2
Ind. Labour Party	B. S. Dean	111	2.4	N/A
Communist	E. Holt	102	2.2	−0.5
Majority		2,037	44.5	+4.4
Turnout		4,576		
Labour hold		Swing		

== Aldermanic elections ==
=== Aldermanic election, 1 July 1964 ===
Caused by the death on 20 June 1964 of Alderman Abraham Moss (Labour, elected as an alderman by the council on 8 January 1947).

In his place, Councillor Alfred Logan (Labour, Newton Heath, elected 26 March 1947) was elected as an alderman by the council on 1 July 1964.

Party	Alderman	Ward	Term expires
Labour	Alfred Logan	Moston	1970

=== Aldermanic election, 17 February 1965 ===
Caused by the death on 31 January 1965 of Alderman Forrester Lord (Labour, elected as an alderman by the council on 5 December 1956).

In his place, Councillor Stanley Jolly (Labour, Openshaw, elected 1 November 1947) was elected as an alderman by the council on 17 February 1965.

Party	Alderman	Ward	Term expires
Labour	Stanley Jolly	Levenshulme	1967

=== Aldermanic election, 7 April 1965 ===
Caused by the death on 24 February 1965 of Alderman Mary Knight (Labour, elected as an alderman by the council on 15 February 1956).

In her place, Councillor Chris Blackwell (Labour, New Cross, elected 12 May 1949) was elected as an alderman by the council on 7 April 1965.

Party	Alderman	Ward	Term expires
Labour	Chris Blackwell	Crumpsall	1967

== By-elections between 1964 and 1965 ==
=== Newton Heath, 17 September 1964 ===
Caused by the election as an alderman of Councillor Alfred Logan (Labour, Newton Heath, elected 26 March 1947) on 1 July 1964, following the death on 20 June 1964 of Alderman Abraham Moss (Labour, elected as an alderman by the council on 8 January 1947).

Newton Heath
Party	Candidate	Votes	%	±%
Labour	M. Johnson	1,356	59.8	−5.1
Conservative	P. B. Walker	823	36.3	+18.0
Communist	J. B. Cross	90	3.9	+0.4
Majority		533	23.5	−23.1
Turnout		2,269		
Labour hold		Swing		

=== Moston, 10 December 1964 ===
Caused by the death of Councillor William Barber (Labour, Moston, elected 9 May 1963) on 15 October 1964.

Moston
Party	Candidate	Votes	%	±%
Conservative	A. Wray	2,056	48.8	+11.9
Labour	A. Davidson	1,569	37.2	−7.0
Liberal	J. Bulmer	589	14.0	−4.9
Majority		487	11.6	
Turnout		4,214		
Conservative gain from Labour		Swing		
