= 1946 Manchester City Council election =

Local election in Manchester, England

- 1 November 1946

36 of 144 seats to Manchester City Council 73 seats needed for a majority
	First party	Second party	Third party
Party	Labour	Conservative	Liberal
Last election	35 seats, 54.0%	19 seats, 37.9%	2 seats, 6.3%
Seats before	73	58	11
Seats won	20	15	1
Seats after	79	55	10
Seat change	▲6	▼3	▼1
Popular vote	93,691	85,186	20,861
Percentage	45.6%	41.5%	10.2%
Swing	▼8.4%	▲3.6%	▲3.9%
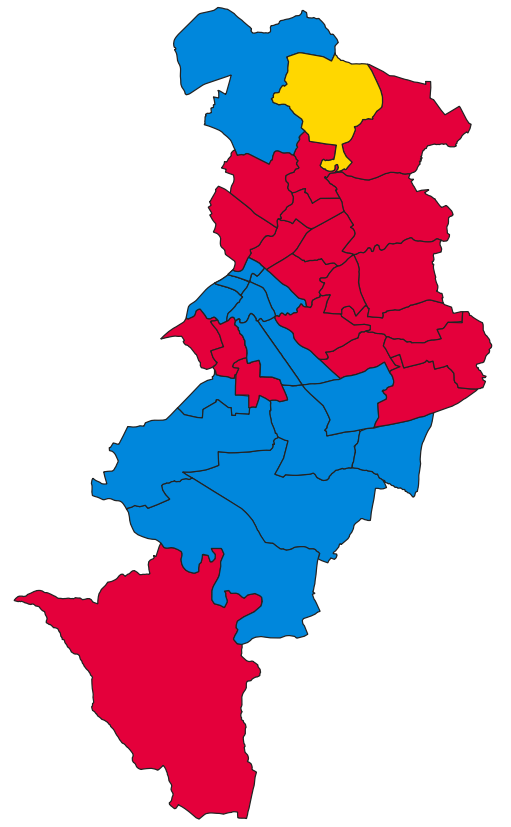
- Map of results of 1946 election
Leader of the Council before election
Labour
Leader of the Council after election
Labour

Elections to Manchester City Council were held on Friday, 1 November 1946. One third of the councillors seats were up for election, with each successful candidate to serve a three-year term of office. The Labour Party retained overall control of the council.

== Election result ==
Party	Votes		Seats			Full Council	
Labour Party	93,691 (45.6%)	▼8.4	20 (55.6%)	20 / 36	▲6	79 (54.9%)	79 / 144
Conservative Party	85,186 (41.5%)	▲3.6	15 (41.7%)	15 / 36	▼3	55 (38.2%)	55 / 144
Liberal Party	20,861 (10.2%)	▲3.9	1 (2.8%)	1 / 36	▼1	10 (6.9%)	10 / 144
Communist	2,897 (1.4%)	▲1.1	0 (0.0%)	0 / 36	▼1	0 (0.0%)	0 / 144
Independent	1,222 (0.6%)	▼0.3	0 (0.0%)	0 / 36	Steady	0 (0.0%)	0 / 144
Residents	1,124 (0.5%)	▲0.2	0 (0.0%)	0 / 36	▼1	0 (0.0%)	0 / 144
Independent Labour Party	473 (0.2%)	▼0.1	0 (0.0%)	0 / 36	Steady	0 (0.0%)	0 / 144

=== Full council ===
↓
79	10	55

=== Aldermen ===
↓
15	8	13

=== Councillors ===
↓
64	2	42

== Ward results ==
=== All Saints' ===
All Saints'
Party	Candidate	Votes	%	±%
Conservative	L. W. Biggs*	1,729	51.1	+5.3
Labour	H. C. Moorcroft	1,511	44.6	−8.3
Liberal	M. Pickles	146	4.3	N/A
Majority		218	6.5	
Turnout		3,386		
Conservative hold		Swing		

=== Ardwick ===
Ardwick
Party	Candidate	Votes	%	±%
Labour	H. Humphreys	2,974	51.2	−0.6
Conservative	N. Beer*	2,836	48.8	+0.6
Majority		138	2.4	−1.2
Turnout		5,810		
Labour gain from Conservative		Swing		

=== Beswick ===
Beswick
Party	Candidate	Votes	%	±%
Labour	H. Baldwin*	3,383	68.2'	−6.8
Conservative	R. S. Smith	1,577	31.8	N/A
Majority		1,806	36.4	−12.1
Turnout		4,960		
Labour hold		Swing		

=== Blackley ===
Blackley
Party	Candidate	Votes	%	±%
Liberal	H. Lee*	5,606	61.8	+46.5
Labour	J. Howard	3,471	38.2	−5.6
Majority		2,135	23.6	
Turnout		9,077		
Liberal hold		Swing		

=== Bradford ===
Bradford
Party	Candidate	Votes	%	±%
Labour	H. Frankland*	3,633	63.3	−11.6
Conservative	W. Rose	2,105	36.7	+11.6
Majority		1,528	26.6	−23.2
Turnout		5,738		
Labour hold		Swing		

=== Cheetham ===
Cheetham
Party	Candidate	Votes	%	±%
Labour	M. P. Pariser	2,547	38.5	−15.3
Conservative	P. Chadwick	2,093	31.7	+6.5
Liberal	S. Needoff	1,278	19.3	−1.7
Communist	B. J. Gershman	693	10.5	N/A
Majority		454	6.8	−19.3
Turnout		6,611		
Labour gain from Conservative		Swing		

=== Chorlton-cum-Hardy ===
Chorlton-cum-Hardy
Party	Candidate	Votes	%	±%
Conservative	W. Somerville*	8,225	57.5	−9.4
Labour	A. Harvey	3,984	27.9	−5.2
Liberal	J. T. Chapman	2,093	14.6	N/A
Majority		4,241	29.7	−4.1
Turnout		14,302		
Conservative hold		Swing		

=== Collegiate Church ===
Collegiate Church
Party	Candidate	Votes	%	±%
Labour	A. S. Moss*	1,544	55.1	+8.9
Independent	A. Gouldman	719	25.7	+14.7
Liberal	F. Charlesworth	281	10.0	−12.0
Communist	M. Jenkins	256	9.1	N/A
Majority		825	29.4	+7.5
Turnout		2,800		
Labour hold		Swing		

=== Collyhurst ===
Collyhurst
Party	Candidate	Votes	%	±%
Labour	W. Collingson*	2,102	60.4	+5.3
Conservative	W. H. Cox	1,115	32.0	+9.4
Communist	S. Wild	262	7.6	−14.8
Majority		987	28.4	−3.0
Turnout		3,479		
Labour hold		Swing		

=== Crumpsall ===
Crumpsall
Party	Candidate	Votes	%	±%
Conservative	H. Lomax*	3,760	46.2	+8.0
Labour	H. Broderick	2,763	34.0	−4.9
Liberal	R. F. Read	1,293	15.9	−7.0
Communist	S. Waring	313	3.9	N/A
Majority		997	12.1	+12.1
Turnout		8,129		
Conservative hold		Swing		

=== Didsbury ===
Didsbury
Party	Candidate	Votes	%	±%
Conservative	S. P. Dawson*	5,619	53.3	−9.1
Labour	F. Siddall	2,833	26.9	−10.7
Liberal	W. H. Wynn	1,943	18.4	N/A
Communist	M. Mandell	151	1.4	N/A
Majority		2,786	26.4	+1.6
Turnout		10,546		
Conservative hold		Swing		

=== Exchange ===
Exchange
Party	Candidate	Votes	%	±%
Conservative	T. A. Higson*	221	93.6	+4.8
Labour	M. Gouldman	15	6.4	−4.8
Majority		206	87.2	+9.6
Turnout		236		
Conservative hold		Swing		

=== Gorton North ===
Gorton North
Party	Candidate	Votes	%	±%
Labour	S. H. Hitchbun*	4,112	66.9	−8.1
Conservative	G. Mowbray	1,599	26.0	+1.0
Liberal	J. T. Barker	436	7.1	N/A
Majority		2,513	40.9	−8.3
Turnout		6,147		
Labour hold		Swing		

=== Gorton South ===
Gorton South
Party	Candidate	Votes	%	±%
Labour	J. Sutton*	3,830	68.3	−5.0
Conservative	T. Brownrigg	1,420	25.3	−1.4
Liberal	B. Riggs	358	6.4	N/A
Majority		2,410	43.0	−3.1
Turnout		5,608		
Labour hold		Swing		

=== Harpurhey ===
Harpurhey
Party	Candidate	Votes	%	±%
Labour	E. Barnacott*	3,007	48.3	−7.4
Conservative	C. F. Howarth	2,693	43.3	−1.0
Liberal	J. Mountford	361	5.8	N/A
Communist	T. Royle	159	2.6	N/A
Majority		314	5.0	−6.4
Turnout		6,220		
Labour hold		Swing		

=== Levenshulme ===
Levenshulme
Party	Candidate	Votes	%	±%
Conservative	R. A. Fieldhouse	2,895	37.0	+1.8
Labour	C. Madden	2,262	28.9	+3.1
Liberal	C. R. de la Wyche*	2,194	28.0	−6.3
Ind. Labour Party	F. Hatton	473	6.1	+1.5
Majority		633	8.1	
Turnout		7,824		
Conservative gain from Liberal		Swing		

=== Longsight ===
Longsight
Party	Candidate	Votes	%	±%
Conservative	H. Sharp*	4,437	52.3	+1.1
Labour	J. W. Upland	3,683	43.4	−5.4
Liberal	A. Foxton	364	4.3	N/A
Majority		754	8.9	+8.0
Turnout		8,484		
Conservative hold		Swing		

=== Medlock Street ===
Medlock Street
Party	Candidate	Votes	%	±%
Labour	M. Conway	1,540	49.6	−8.6
Conservative	A. Lees	1,257	40.5	+5.9
Communist	L. C. Walker	178	5.7	N/A
Liberal	H. K. Dawson	127	4.1	N/A
Majority		283	9.1	−12.5
Turnout		3,102		
Labour gain from Communist		Swing		

=== Miles Platting ===
Miles Platting
Party	Candidate	Votes	%	±%
Labour	W. C. Chadwick*	2,973	60.4	−3.9
Conservative	W. L. Goodfellow	1,948	39.6	+3.9
Majority		1,025	20.8	−7.8
Turnout		4,921		
Labour hold		Swing		

=== Moss Side East ===
Moss Side East
Party	Candidate	Votes	%	±%
Labour	W. A. Downward	1,757	39.5	−11.9
Conservative	H. A. E. Ramsden	1,569	35.3	−2.0
Residents	A. R. Edwards*	1,124	25.4	+14.1
Majority		188	4.2	−9.9
Turnout		4,450		
Labour gain from Residents		Swing		

=== Moss Side West ===
Moss Side West
Party	Candidate	Votes	%	±%
Conservative	S. C. Brewster*	2,535	43.2	+1.3
Labour	E. Mendell	2,370	40.3	−5.3
Independent	G. J. Playford	493	8.4	+0.3
Liberal	R. Frere	476	8.1	N/A
Majority		165	2.9	
Turnout		5,874		
Conservative hold		Swing		

=== Moston ===
Moston
Party	Candidate	Votes	%	±%
Labour	W. Onions*	4,613	50.2	−8.3
Conservative	M. Dunn	3,777	41.1	+14.0
Liberal	H. Kevin Armitage	805	8.8	−5.6
Majority		836	9.1	−22.4
Turnout		9,195		
Labour hold		Swing		

=== New Cross ===
New Cross
Party	Candidate	Votes	%	±%
Labour	W. Murray	2,050	71.9	−16.6
Conservative	T. Smith	801	28.1	N/A
Majority		1,249	43.8	−33.1
Turnout		2,851		
Labour hold		Swing		

=== Newton Heath ===
Newton Heath
Party	Candidate	Votes	%	±%
Labour	C. E. P. Stott*	3,213	59.3	−5.9
Conservative	W. H. Priestnall	2,207	40.7	+5.9
Majority		1,006	18.6	−11.2
Turnout		5,420		
Labour hold		Swing		

=== Openshaw ===
Openshaw
Party	Candidate	Votes	%	±%
Labour	T. Nally*	2,825	69.5	−10.2
Conservative	C. Parker	1,004	24.7	+4.5
Communist	T. Rowlandson	237	5.8	N/A
Majority		1,821	44.8	−14.7
Turnout		4,066		
Labour hold		Swing		

=== Oxford ===
Oxford
Party	Candidate	Votes	%	±%
Conservative	C. B. Walker*	350	89.5	+4.2
Labour	F. Donion	41	10.5	−4.2
Majority		309	79.0	+9.2
Turnout		391		
Conservative hold		Swing		

=== Rusholme ===
Rusholme
Party	Candidate	Votes	%	±%
Conservative	R. C. Rodgers*	5,029	65.4	+10.6
Labour	B. Chamberlain	2,663	34.6	−5.4
Majority		2,366	30.8	+16.0
Turnout		7,692		
Conservative hold		Swing		

=== St. Ann's ===
St. Ann's
Party	Candidate	Votes	%	±%
Conservative	D. Gosling	443	71.0	−19.0
Liberal	A. Bradley	156	25.0	N/A
Labour	J. Fern	25	4.0	−6.0
Majority		287	46.0	−34.0
Turnout		624		
Conservative hold		Swing		

=== St. Clement's ===
St. Clement's
Party	Candidate	Votes	%	±%
Conservative	J. E. Fitzsimons*	345	72.8	+28.7
Labour	W. Sampey	119	25.1	+7.2
Independent	F. R. Phillips	10	2.1	N/A
Majority		226	47.7	
Turnout		474		
Conservative hold		Swing		

=== St. George's ===
St. George's
Party	Candidate	Votes	%	±%
Labour	C. Gordon	2,426	57.1	−0.2
Conservative	R. B. Breeze*	1,819	42.9	+4.9
Majority		607	14.2	−5.1
Turnout		4,245		
Labour gain from Conservative		Swing		

=== St. John's ===
St. John's
Party	Candidate	Votes	%	±%
Conservative	F. E. Tylecote*	539	62.4	−0.8
Liberal	L. J. Fallon	208	24.1	+9.2
Labour	N. Randolph	117	13.5	−8.5
Majority		331	38.3	+5.9
Turnout		864		
Conservative hold		Swing		

=== St. Luke's ===
St. Luke's
Party	Candidate	Votes	%	±%
Conservative	C. V. Jarvis	2,354	49.4	+8.4
Labour	W. Wilson	2,019	42.4	−3.1
Liberal	J. E. Moore	392	8.2	−5.3
Majority		335	7.0	
Turnout		4,765		
Conservative hold		Swing		

=== St. Mark's ===
St. Mark's
Party	Candidate	Votes	%	±%
Labour	J. W. Ellershaw*	3,172	62.0	−3.1
Conservative	W. Sharp	1,779	34.8	−0.1
Liberal	A. McCann	172	3.4	N/A
Majority		1,393	27.2	+0.5
Turnout		5,114		
Labour hold		Swing		

=== St. Michael's ===
St. Michael's
Party	Candidate	Votes	%	±%
Labour	W. M. McGuirk	1,692	80.0	+1.4
Liberal	L. Cromwell	422	20.0	N/A
Majority		1,270	60.0	+2.8
Turnout		2,114		
Labour hold		Swing		

=== Withington ===
Withington
Party	Candidate	Votes	%	±%
Conservative	W. H. Scholfield*	9,233	54.4	+10.2
Labour	F. H. Robinson	5,984	35.3	−6.4
Liberal	A. J. Higson	1,750	10.3	−3.9
Majority		3,249	19.1	+18.3
Turnout		16,967		
Conservative hold		Swing		

=== Wythenshawe ===
Wythenshawe
Party	Candidate	Votes	%	±%
Labour	H. S. Gatley	6,438	49.7	−13.2
Conservative	J. J. Shawe	5,873	45.3	+8.2
Communist	W. Prince	648	5.0	N/A
Majority		565	4.4	−21.4
Turnout		12,959		
Labour gain from Conservative		Swing		

== Aldermanic elections ==
=== Aldermanic elections, 4 December 1946 ===
Caused by the resignation on 9 November 1946 of Alderman Thomas Henry Hinchcliffe (Conservative, elected as an alderman by the council on 9 November 1925).

In his place, Councillor Stanley Hitchbun (Labour, Gorton North, elected 14 May 1929) was elected as an alderman by the council on 4 December 1946.

Party	Alderman	Ward	Term expires
Labour	Stanley Hitchbun	St. George's	1949

Caused by the death on 26 November 1946 of Alderman Charles Wood (Labour, elected as an alderman by the council on 7 February 1940).

In his place, Councillor Frank Gregson (Labour, Moston, elected 1 November 1929; previously 1919-21) was elected as an alderman by the council on 4 December 1946.

Party	Alderman	Ward	Term expires
Labour	Frank Gregson	Withington	1949

=== Aldermanic election, 8 January 1947 ===
Caused by the death on 20 December 1946 of Alderman Thomas Cassidy (Labour, elected as an alderman by the council on 16 February 1938).

In his place, Councillor Abraham Moss (Labour, Collegiate Church, elected 14 December 1938; previously 1929-38) was elected as an alderman by the council on 8 January 1947.

Party	Alderman	Ward	Term expires
Labour	Abraham Moss	Moston	1952

=== Aldermanic election, 7 May 1947 ===
Caused by the death on 4 April 1947 of Alderman Joseph Binns (Labour, elected as an alderman by the council on 7 January 1931).

In his place, Councillor Robert Moss (Labour, Openshaw, elected 1 November 1930) was elected as an alderman by the council on 7 May 1947.

Party	Alderman	Ward	Term expires
Labour	Robert Moss	Exchange	1952

== By-elections between 1946 and 1947 ==
=== By-elections, 23 January 1947 ===
Two by-elections were held on 23 January 1947 to fill vacancies that were created by the appointment of aldermen on 4 December 1946.

==== Gorton North ====
Caused by the election as an alderman of Councillor Stanley Hitchbun (Labour, Gorton North, elected 14 May 1929) on 4 December 1946, following the resignation on 9 November 1946 of Alderman Thomas Henry Hinchcliffe (Conservative, elected as an alderman by the council on 9 November 1925).

Gorton North
Party	Candidate	Votes	%	±%
Labour	F. Siddall	2,848	50.8	−16.1
Conservative	H. Knight	2,565	45.7	+19.7
Liberal	J. T. Barker	195	3.5	−3.6
Majority		283	5.1	−35.8
Turnout		5,608		
Labour hold		Swing		

==== Moston ====
Caused by the election as an alderman of Councillor Frank Gregson (Labour, Moston, elected 1 November 1929; previously 1919-21) on 4 December 1946, following the death on 26 November 1946 of Alderman Charles Wood (Labour, elected as an alderman by the council on 7 February 1940).

Moston
Party	Candidate	Votes	%	±%
Conservative	M. Dunn	3,820	50.1	+9.0
Labour	A. Barnacott	3,165	41.5	−8.7
Liberal	H. Kevin Armitage	638	8.4	−0.4
Majority		655	8.6	
Turnout		7,623		
Conservative gain from Labour		Swing		

=== Collegiate Church, 30 January 1947 ===
Caused by the election as an alderman of Councillor Abraham Moss (Labour, Collegiate Church, elected 14 December 1938; previously 1929-38) on 8 January 1947, following the death on 20 December 1946 of Alderman Thomas Cassidy (Labour, elected as an alderman by the council on 16 February 1938).

Collegiate Church
Party	Candidate	Votes	%	±%
Labour	E. Mendell	809	46.7	−8.4
Conservative	G. W. G. Fitzsimons	732	42.2	N/A
Liberal	R. Frere	144	8.3	−1.7
Communist	M. Jenkins	49	2.8	−6.3
Majority		77	4.5	−24.9
Turnout		1,734		
Labour hold		Swing		

=== By-elections, 13 March 1947 ===
Two by-elections were held on 13 March 1947 to fill vacancies that were created by the appointment of aldermen on 4 December 1946.

==== Harpurhey ====
Caused by the death of Councillor Edward Barnacott (Labour, Harpurhey, elected 1 November 1934) on 3 February 1947.

Harpurhey
Party	Candidate	Votes	%	±%
Conservative	A. L. Mansfield	2,748	54.8	+11.5
Labour	A. Barnacott	2,269	45.2	−3.1
Majority		479	9.6	
Turnout		5,017		
Conservative gain from Labour		Swing		

==== Moss Side East ====
Caused by the death of Councillor Thomas Knowles (Labour, Moss Side East, elected 1 November 1945) on 5 February 1947.

Moss Side East
Party	Candidate	Votes	%	±%
Conservative	H. A. E. Ramsden	1,654	51.2	+15.9
Labour	J. W. Upton	1,059	32.8	−6.7
Residents	A. R. Edwards	376	11.6	−13.8
Liberal	J. E. Moore	139	4.4	N/A
Majority		595	18.4	
Turnout		4,450		
Conservative gain from Labour		Swing		

=== Newton Heath, 26 March 1947 ===
Caused by the death of Councillor Annie Eyres (Labour, Newton Heath, elected 5 June 1940) on 26 February 1947.

Newton Heath
Party	Candidate	Votes	%	±%
Labour	A. Logan	3,328	50.8	−8.5
Conservative	W. H. Priestnall	3,226	49.2	+8.5
Majority		102	1.6	−17.0
Turnout		6,554		
Labour hold		Swing		
