= Collegiate Church (Manchester ward) =

- Ward
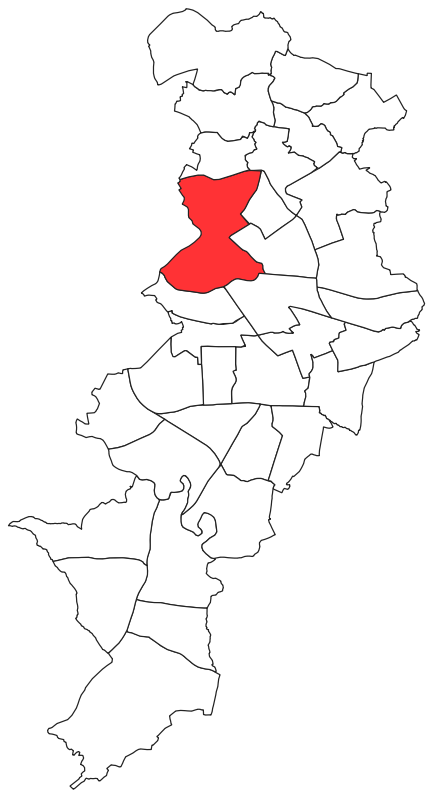
- Collegiate Church ward (1931) within Manchester

- Coat of arms
- Country: United Kingdom
- Constituent country: England
- Region: North West England
- County: Greater Manchester
- Metropolitan borough: Manchester
- Created: December 1838
- Named for: Cathedral and Collegiate Church of St Mary, St Denys, and St George

Government
  - Type: Unicameral
  - Body: Manchester City Council
- UK Parliamentary Constituency: Manchester Central

Collegiate Church was an electoral division of Manchester City Council which was represented from 1838 until 1982. It covered parts of Manchester city centre and the Strangeways area of North Manchester.

== Overview ==
Collegiate Church ward was one of the fifteen municipal wards created in 1838, when the Manchester Borough Council was granted a Charter of Incorporation under the provisions of the Municipal Corporations Act 1835.

Initially, the ward's boundaries corresponded with those of Districts No.3 (Collegiate Church) and No.5 (St. Paul's) of the Manchester Township, which covered the Strangeways area and part of what is now the Northern Quarter of the city centre. Its original boundaries remained in place until 1919, when that part of the ward to the west of Corporation Street was divided between the Exchange and St. Clement's wards, while that part of Cheetham ward to the south of Elizabeth Street was transferred to Collegiate Church. Further boundary changes in 1950, transferred more of the Cheetham ward to Collegiate Church. In 1971, the ward incorporated most of the area of the former Hugh Oldham and St. Peter's wards in Manchester city centre. The ward was abolished following another boundary revision in 1982, and its remaining area was divided between the Cheetham ward and the new Central ward.

From 1838 until 1885, the ward formed part of the Manchester Parliamentary constituency. From 1885 until 1918, it was part of the Manchester North West Parliamentary constituency. From 1918 until 1974, it was part of the Manchester Exchange Parliamentary constituency. Between 1974 and its abolition, it formed part of the Manchester Central Parliamentary constituency.

== Councillors ==
Election	Councillor	Councillor	Councillor
1838	Samuel Satterthwaite (Lib)	James Kershaw (Lib)	George Hargreaves Winder (Lib)
May 1839	Samuel Satterthwaite (Lib)	Thomas Woolley (Lib)	George Hargreaves Winder (Lib)
1839	Samuel Satterthwaite (Lib)	Thomas Woolley (Lib)	George Hargreaves Winder (Lib)
1840	Samuel Satterthwaite (Lib)	Thomas Woolley (Lib)	George Hargreaves Winder (Lib)
1841	Peter Tunrner Candelet (Lib)	Thomas Woolley (Lib)	George Hargreaves Winder (Lib)
1842	Peter Tunrner Candelet (Lib)	Thomas Woolley (Lib)	Thomas Handley (Lib)
1843	Peter Tunrner Candelet (Lib)	Abel Heywood (Lib)	Thomas Handley (Lib)
1844	Joseph Sutcliffe (Lib)	Abel Heywood (Lib)	Thomas Handley (Lib)
1845	Joseph Sutcliffe (Lib)	Abel Heywood (Lib)	Thomas Handley (Lib)
(1845–1872)
1872	W. Griffin (Con)	T. S. Muirhead (Lib)	T. Worthington (Lib)
1873	W. Griffin (Con)	T. S. Muirhead (Lib)	T. Worthington (Lib)
1874	W. Griffin (Con)	T. S. Muirhead (Lib)	T. Worthington (Lib)
1875	W. Griffin (Con)	T. S. Muirhead (Lib)	T. Peel (Lib)
1876	W. Griffin (Con)	T. S. Muirhead (Lib)	T. Peel (Lib)
1877	W. Griffin (Con)	T. S. Muirhead (Lib)	T. Peel (Lib)
1878	W. Griffin (Con)	T. S. Muirhead (Lib)	T. Peel (Lib)
1879	W. Griffin (Con)	T. S. Muirhead (Lib)	T. Peel (Lib)
1880	W. Griffin (Con)	T. S. Muirhead (Lib)	T. Peel (Lib)
1881	W. Griffin (Con)	T. S. Muirhead (Lib)	T. Peel (Lib)
1882	W. Griffin (Con)	T. S. Muirhead (Lib)	T. Peel (Lib)
1883	W. Griffin (Con)	T. S. Muirhead (Lib)	T. Peel (Lib)
1884	W. Griffin (Con)	T. S. Muirhead (Lib)	W. A. Nicholls (Lib)
1885	W. Griffin (Con)	J. Brooks (Lib)	W. A. Nicholls (Lib)
November 1885	C. Griffin (Con)	J. Brooks (Lib)	W. A. Nicholls (Lib)
1886	C. Payne (Lib)	J. Brooks (Lib)	W. A. Nicholls (Lib)
1887	C. Payne (Lib)	J. Brooks (Lib)	R. Affleck (Lib)
1888	C. Payne (Lib)	J. Brooks (Lib)	R. Affleck (Lib)
1889	J. Bradshaw (Con)	J. Brooks (Lib)	R. Affleck (Lib)
1890	J. Bradshaw (Con)	J. Brooks (Lib)	W. Bagnall (Con)
1891	J. Bradshaw (Con)	J. Brooks (Lib)	W. Bagnall (Con)
1892	J. Bradshaw (Con)	J. Brooks (Lib)	W. Bagnall (Con)
1893	J. Bradshaw (Con)	J. Brooks (Lib)	W. Bagnall (Con)
1894	J. Bradshaw (Con)	J. Royle (Lib)	W. Bagnall (Con)
1895	J. Bradshaw (Con)	J. Royle (Lib)	W. Bagnall (Con)
1896	J. Bradshaw (Con)	J. Royle (Lib)	W. E. Cary (Lib)
1897	J. Bradshaw (Con)	J. Royle (Lib)	W. E. Cary (Lib)
1898	J. R. Smith (Con)	J. Royle (Lib)	W. E. Cary (Lib)
1899	J. R. Smith (Con)	J. Royle (Lib)	J. Lowry (Con)
1900	J. R. Smith (Con)	J. Royle (Lib)	J. Lowry (Con)
1901	J. R. Smith (Con)	J. Royle (Lib)	J. Lowry (Con)
1902	J. R. Smith (Con)	J. Royle (Lib)	J. Lowry (Con)
1903	J. R. Smith (Con)	J. Royle (Lib)	J. Lowry (Con)
1904	J. R. Smith (Con)	J. Royle (Lib)	J. Lowry (Con)
1905	J. R. Smith (Con)	J. Royle (Lib)	J. Lowry (Con)
1906	J. R. Smith (Con)	J. Royle (Lib)	J. Lowry (Con)
1907	J. R. Smith (Con)	J. Royle (Lib)	J. Lowry (Con)
April 1908	J. R. Smith (Con)	C. F. Poyser (Con)	J. Lowry (Con)
1908	J. R. Smith (Con)	C. F. Poyser (Con)	J. Lowry (Con)
1909	J. R. Smith (Con)	E. Barker (Lib)	J. Lowry (Con)
1910	J. R. Smith (Con)	E. Barker (Lib)	J. Lowry (Con)
1911	J. R. Smith (Con)	E. Barker (Lib)	J. Lowry (Con)
1912	J. R. Smith (Con)	P. Taylor (Con)	J. Lowry (Con)
January 1913	J. R. Smith (Con)	P. Taylor (Con)	T. R. Hewlett (Con)
April 1913	J. Hill (Con)	P. Taylor (Con)	T. R. Hewlett (Con)
1913	J. Hill (Con)	P. Taylor (Con)	T. R. Hewlett (Con)
1914	J. Hill (Con)	P. Taylor (Con)	T. R. Hewlett (Con)
1919	J. Hill (Con)	J. Elliott (Con)	T. R. Hewlett (Con)
1920	J. Hill (Con)	J. Elliott (Con)	T. R. Hewlett (Con)
1921	J. Hill (Con)	J. Elliott (Con)	D. Gouldman (Ind)
1922	J. Hill (Con)	J. Elliott (Con)	D. Gouldman (Ind)
1923	J. Hill (Con)	J. Elliott (Con)	D. Gouldman (Ind)
1924	J. Hill (Con)	J. Elliott (Con)	D. Gouldman (Ind)
1925	J. Hill (Con)	J. Elliott (Con)	D. Gouldman (Ind)
1926	J. Hill (Con)	J. Elliott (Con)	D. Gouldman (Ind)
1927	J. Hill (Con)	J. Elliott (Con)	D. Gouldman (Ind)
1928	J. Hill (Con)	J. Elliott (Con)	D. Gouldman (Ind)
1929	A. S. Moss (Lib)	J. Elliott (Con)	D. Gouldman (Ind)
1930	A. S. Moss (Lib)	J. Elliott (Con)	D. Gouldman (Ind)
1931	A. S. Moss (Lib)	J. Elliott (Con)	D. Gouldman (Ind)
1932	A. S. Moss (Lib)	J. Elliott (Con)	D. Gouldman (Ind)
1933	A. S. Moss (Lib)	J. Elliott (Con)	D. Gouldman (Ind)
1934	A. S. Moss (Lib)	S. Holmes (Con)	D. Gouldman (Ind)
1935	A. S. Moss (Lib)	S. Holmes (Con)	D. Gouldman (Ind)
1936	A. S. Moss (Lib)	S. Holmes (Con)	D. Gouldman (Ind)
1937	A. S. Moss (Lib)	S. Holmes (Con)	D. Gouldman (Ind)
March 1938	A. S. Moss (Lib)	S. Holmes (Con)	A. Gouldman (Ind)
1938	A. Levy (Ind)	S. Holmes (Con)	A. Gouldman (Ind)
December 1938	A. S. Moss (Lib)	S. Holmes (Con)	A. Gouldman (Ind)
1945	R. Finkel (Lab)	A. S. Moss (Lib)	B. S. Langton (Lab)
March 1946	R. Finkel (Lab)	A. S. Moss (Lab)	B. S. Langton (Lab)
1946	R. Finkel (Lab)	A. S. Moss (Lab)	B. S. Langton (Lab)
January 1947	R. Finkel (Lab)	E. Mendell (Lab)	B. S. Langton (Lab)
1947	R. Finkel (Lab)	E. Mendell (Lab)	B. S. Langton (Lab)
1949	R. Finkel (Lab)	E. Mendell (Lab)	B. S. Langton (Lab)
1950	R. Finkel (Lab)	E. Mendell (Lab)	B. S. Langton (Lab)
1951	R. Finkel (Lab)	E. Mendell (Lab)	B. S. Langton (Lab)
1952	R. Finkel (Lab)	E. Mendell (Lab)	B. S. Langton (Lab)
1953	R. Finkel (Lab)	E. Mendell (Lab)	B. S. Langton (Lab)
1954	R. Finkel (Lab)	E. Mendell (Lab)	B. S. Langton (Lab)
1955	R. Finkel (Lab)	E. Mendell (Lab)	B. S. Langton (Lab)
1956	R. Finkel (Lab)	E. Mendell (Lab)	B. S. Langton (Lab)
1957	R. Finkel (Lab)	E. Mendell (Lab)	B. S. Langton (Lab)
1958	R. Finkel (Lab)	E. Mendell (Lab)	B. S. Langton (Lab)
1959	R. Finkel (Lab)	E. Mendell (Lab)	B. S. Langton (Lab)
1960	R. Finkel (Lab)	E. Mendell (Lab)	B. S. Langton (Lab)
1961	R. Finkel (Lab)	E. Mendell (Lab)	B. S. Langton (Lab)
1962	R. Finkel (Lab)	E. Mendell (Lab)	B. S. Langton (Lab)
1963	S. A. Ogden (Lab)	E. Mendell (Lab)	B. S. Langton (Lab)
October 1963	S. A. Ogden (Lab)	M. Seigleman (Lab)	J. Davis (Lab)
1964	S. A. Ogden (Lab)	M. Seigleman (Lab)	J. Davis (Lab)
1965	S. A. Ogden (Lab)	M. Seigleman (Lab)	J. Davis (Lab)
March 1966	S. A. Ogden (Lab)	R. F. Delahunty (Lab)	J. Davis (Lab)
1966	S. A. Ogden (Lab)	R. F. Delahunty (Lab)	J. Davis (Lab)
1967	S. A. Ogden (Lab)	R. F. Delahunty (Lab)	J. Davis (Lab)
1968	S. A. Ogden (Lab)	R. F. Delahunty (Lab)	J. Davis (Lab)
1969	S. A. Ogden (Lab)	R. F. Delahunty (Lab)	J. Davis (Lab)
1970	S. A. Ogden (Lab)	R. F. Delahunty (Lab)	J. Davis (Lab)
1971	R. F. Delahunty (Lab)	S. A. Ogden (Lab)	F. J. Balcombe (Lab)
1972	R. F. Delahunty (Lab)	S. A. Ogden (Lab)	F. J. Balcombe (Lab)
1973	F. J. Balcombe (Lab)	S. A. Ogden (Lab)	J. B. Ogden (Lab)
1975	F. J. Balcombe (Lab)	S. A. Ogden (Lab)	J. B. Ogden (Lab)
1976	F. J. Balcombe (Lab)	S. A. Ogden (Lab)	J. B. Ogden (Lab)
1978	F. J. Balcombe (Lab)	S. A. Ogden (Lab)	J. B. Ogden (Lab)
1979	F. J. Balcombe (Lab)	S. A. Ogden (Lab)	P. Karney (Lab)
1980	F. J. Balcombe (Lab)	J. Bradley (Lab)	P. Karney (Lab)
July 1981	F. J. Balcombe (Lab)	J. Bradley (SDP)	P. Karney (Lab)
November 1981	F. J. Balcombe (SDP)	J. Bradley (SDP)	P. Karney (Lab)

== Elections ==
=== Elections in 1830s ===
==== December 1838 ====
1838 (3 vacancies)
Party	Candidate	Votes	%	±%
Liberal	Samuel Satterthwaite	440	100.0	
Liberal	James Kershaw	439	99.8	
Liberal	George Hargreaves Winder	437	99.3	
Turnout		440		
Liberal win (new seat)				
Liberal win (new seat)				
Liberal win (new seat)				

==== May 1839 (by-election) ====
By-election: 16 May 1839
Party	Candidate	Votes	%	±%
Liberal	Thomas Woolley	uncontested		
Liberal hold		Swing		

==== November 1839 ====
1839
Party	Candidate	Votes	%	±%
Liberal	George Hargreaves Winder*	uncontested		
Liberal hold		Swing		

=== Elections in 1840s ===
==== November 1840 ====
1840
Party	Candidate	Votes	%	±%
Liberal	Thomas Woolley*	uncontested		
Liberal hold		Swing		

==== November 1841 ====
1841
Party	Candidate	Votes	%	±%
Liberal	Peter Turner Candelet	75	63.6	N/A
Liberal	Samuel Satterthwaite*	42	35.6	N/A
Independent	John Smith	1	0.8	N/A
Majority		33	15.5	N/A
Turnout		118		
Liberal gain from Liberal		Swing		

==== November 1842 ====
1842
Party	Candidate	Votes	%	±%
Liberal	Thomas Handley	64	63.6	+31.9
Independent	Samuel Berry	3	4.5	+3.7
Majority		61	91.0	+75.5
Turnout		67		
Liberal hold		Swing		

==== November 1843 ====
1843
Party	Candidate	Votes	%	±%
Liberal	Abel Heywood	uncontested		
Liberal hold		Swing		

==== November 1844 ====
1844
Party	Candidate	Votes	%	±%
Liberal	Joseph Sutcliffe	uncontested		
Liberal hold		Swing		

==== November 1845 ====
1845
Party	Candidate	Votes	%	±%
Liberal	Thomas Handley*	uncontested		
Liberal hold		Swing		

=== Elections in 1870s ===
==== November 1872 ====
1872
Party	Candidate	Votes	%	±%
Liberal	T. Worthington*	902	56.0	
Conservative	R. Simister	709	44.0	
Majority		193	12.0	
Turnout		1,611		
Liberal hold		Swing		

==== November 1873 ====
1873
Party	Candidate	Votes	%	±%
Liberal	T. S. Muirhead*	uncontested		
Liberal hold		Swing		

==== November 1874 ====
1874
Party	Candidate	Votes	%	±%
Conservative	W. Griffin*	893	57.3	N/A
Liberal	T. Peel	665	42.7	N/A
Majority		228	14.6	N/A
Turnout		1,558		
Conservative hold		Swing		

==== November 1875 ====
1875
Party	Candidate	Votes	%	±%
Liberal	T. Peel	860	50.9	+8.2
Conservative	R. Simister*	829	49.1	−8.2
Majority		31	1.8	
Turnout		1,689		
Liberal gain from Conservative		Swing		

==== November 1876 ====
1876
Party	Candidate	Votes	%	±%
Liberal	T. S. Muirhead	uncontested		
Liberal hold		Swing		

==== November 1877 ====
1877
Party	Candidate	Votes	%	±%
Conservative	W. Griffin*	uncontested		
Conservative hold		Swing		

==== November 1878 ====
1878
Party	Candidate	Votes	%	±%
Liberal	T. Peel*	uncontested		
Liberal hold		Swing		

==== November 1879 ====
1879
Party	Candidate	Votes	%	±%
Liberal	T. S. Muirhead*	uncontested		
Liberal hold		Swing		

=== Elections in 1880s ===
==== November 1880 ====
1880
Party	Candidate	Votes	%	±%
Conservative	W. Griffin*	uncontested		
Conservative hold		Swing		

==== November 1881 ====
1881
Party	Candidate	Votes	%	±%
Liberal	T. Peel*	uncontested		
Liberal hold		Swing		

==== November 1882 ====
1882
Party	Candidate	Votes	%	±%
Liberal	T. S. Muirhead*	uncontested		
Liberal hold		Swing		

==== November 1883 ====
1883
Party	Candidate	Votes	%	±%
Conservative	W. Griffin*	uncontested		
Conservative hold		Swing		

==== November 1884 ====
1884
Party	Candidate	Votes	%	±%
Liberal	W. A. Nicholls*	uncontested		
Liberal hold		Swing		

==== November 1885 ====
1885
Party	Candidate	Votes	%	±%
Liberal	J. Brooks*	uncontested		
Liberal hold		Swing		

==== November 1885 (by-election) ====
By-election: 25 November 1885
Party	Candidate	Votes	%	±%
Conservative	C. Griffin	797	58.4	N/A
Liberal	J. Ashworth	568	41.6	N/A
Majority		229	16.8	N/A
Turnout		1,365		
Conservative hold		Swing		

==== November 1886 ====
1886
Party	Candidate	Votes	%	±%
Liberal	C. Payne	648	52.9	N/A
Conservative	C. Griffin*	576	47.1	N/A
Majority		72	5.8	N/A
Turnout		1,224		
Liberal gain from Conservative		Swing		

==== November 1887 ====
1887
Party	Candidate	Votes	%	±%
Liberal	R. Affleck	683	53.4	+0.5
Conservative	D. Reid	597	46.6	−0.5
Majority		86	6.8	+1.0
Turnout		1,280		
Liberal hold		Swing		

==== November 1888 ====
1888
Party	Candidate	Votes	%	±%
Liberal	J. Brooks*	uncontested		
Liberal hold		Swing		

==== November 1889 ====
1889
Party	Candidate	Votes	%	±%
Conservative	J. Bradshaw	834	57.4	N/A
Liberal	E. Barton	619	42.6	N/A
Majority		215	14.8	N/A
Turnout		1,453		
Conservative gain from Liberal		Swing		

=== Elections in 1890s ===
==== November 1890 ====
1890
Party	Candidate	Votes	%	±%
Conservative	W. Bagnall*	842	58.3	+0.9
Liberal	J. Harrop	602	41.7	−0.9
Majority		240	16.6	+1.8
Turnout		1,444		
Conservative hold		Swing		

==== November 1891 ====
1891
Party	Candidate	Votes	%	±%
Liberal	J. Brooks*	uncontested		
Liberal hold		Swing		

==== November 1892 ====
1892
Party	Candidate	Votes	%	±%
Conservative	J. Bradshaw*	uncontested		
Conservative hold		Swing		

==== November 1893 ====
1893
Party	Candidate	Votes	%	±%
Conservative	W. Bagnall*	uncontested		
Conservative hold		Swing		

==== November 1894 ====
1894
Party	Candidate	Votes	%	±%
Liberal	J. Royle*	uncontested		
Liberal hold		Swing		

==== November 1895 ====
1895
Party	Candidate	Votes	%	±%
Conservative	J. Bradshaw*	uncontested		
Conservative hold		Swing		

==== November 1896 ====
1896
Party	Candidate	Votes	%	±%
Liberal	W. E. Cary*	uncontested		
Liberal hold		Swing		

==== November 1897 ====
1897
Party	Candidate	Votes	%	±%
Liberal	J. Royle*	656	50.9	N/A
Conservative	J. R. Smith	633	49.1	N/A
Majority		23	1.8	N/A
Turnout		1,289		
Liberal hold		Swing		

==== November 1898 ====
1898
Party	Candidate	Votes	%	±%
Conservative	J. R. Smith	uncontested		
Conservative hold		Swing		

==== November 1899 ====
1899
Party	Candidate	Votes	%	±%
Conservative	J. Lowry	512	44.3	N/A
Liberal	H. Whitehouse	380	32.8	N/A
Conservative	J. Makeague	265	22.9	N/A
Majority		132	11.5	N/A
Turnout		1,157		
Conservative gain from Liberal		Swing		

=== Elections in 1900s ===
==== November 1900 ====
1900
Party	Candidate	Votes	%	±%
Liberal	J. Royle*	uncontested		
Liberal hold		Swing		

==== November 1901 ====
1901
Party	Candidate	Votes	%	±%
Conservative	J. R. Smith*	uncontested		
Conservative hold		Swing		

==== November 1902 ====
1902
Party	Candidate	Votes	%	±%
Conservative	J. Lowry*	uncontested		
Conservative hold		Swing		

==== November 1903 ====
1903
Party	Candidate	Votes	%	±%
Liberal	J. Royle*	uncontested		
Liberal hold		Swing		

==== November 1904 ====
1904
Party	Candidate	Votes	%	±%
Conservative	J. R. Smith*	567	53.5	N/A
Liberal	W. H. Thomas	493	46.5	N/A
Majority		74	7.0	N/A
Turnout		1,060		
Conservative hold		Swing		

==== November 1905 ====
1905
Party	Candidate	Votes	%	±%
Conservative	J. Lowry*	uncontested		
Conservative hold		Swing		

==== November 1906 ====
1906
Party	Candidate	Votes	%	±%
Liberal	J. Royle*	uncontested		
Liberal hold		Swing		

==== November 1907 ====
1907
Party	Candidate	Votes	%	±%
Conservative	J. R. Smith*	uncontested		
Conservative hold		Swing		

==== April 1908 (by-election) ====
By-election: 22 April 1908
Party	Candidate	Votes	%	±%
Conservative	C. F. Poyser	445	52.1	N/A
Liberal	G. B. Birdsall	409	47.9	N/A
Majority		36	4.2	N/A
Turnout		854		
Conservative gain from Liberal		Swing		

==== November 1908 ====
1908
Party	Candidate	Votes	%	±%
Conservative	J. Lowry*	uncontested		
Conservative hold		Swing		

==== November 1909 ====
1909
Party	Candidate	Votes	%	±%
Liberal	E. Barker	489	53.2	N/A
Conservative	C. F. Poyser*	431	46.8	N/A
Majority		58	6.4	N/A
Turnout		920		
Liberal gain from Conservative		Swing		

=== Elections in 1910s ===
==== November 1910 ====
1910
Party	Candidate	Votes	%	±%
Conservative	J. R. Smith*	uncontested		
Conservative hold		Swing		

==== November 1911 ====
1911
Party	Candidate	Votes	%	±%
Conservative	J. Lowry*	uncontested		
Conservative hold		Swing		

==== November 1912 ====
1912
Party	Candidate	Votes	%	±%
Conservative	P. Taylor	456	52.8	N/A
Liberal	E. Barker*	408	47.2	N/A
Majority		48	5.6	N/A
Turnout		864		
Conservative gain from Liberal		Swing		

==== January 1913 (by-election) ====
By-election: 23 January 1913
Party	Candidate	Votes	%	±%
Conservative	T. R. Hewlett	415	50.6	−2.2
Liberal	E. Barker	405	49.4	+2.2
Majority		10	1.2	−4.4
Turnout		820		
Conservative hold		Swing		

==== April 1913 (by-election) ====
By-election: 15 April 1913
Party	Candidate	Votes	%	±%
Conservative	J. Hill	442	51.6	−1.2
Liberal	E. Barker	415	48.4	+1.2
Majority		27	3.2	−2.4
Turnout		857		
Conservative hold		Swing		

==== November 1913 ====
1913
Party	Candidate	Votes	%	±%
Conservative	J. Hill*	560	66.0	+13.2
Liberal	E. J. Bainbridge	289	34.0	−13.2
Majority		271	32.0	+26.4
Turnout		849		
Conservative hold		Swing		

==== November 1914 ====
1914
Party	Candidate	Votes	%	±%
Conservative	T. R. Hewlett*	uncontested		
Conservative hold		Swing		

==== November 1919 ====
1919 (new boundaries)
Party	Candidate	Votes	%	±%
Conservative	J. Elliott*	811	48.9	
Liberal	H. A. Nathan	458	27.6	
Independent	D. Gouldman	391	23.6	
Majority		353	21.3	
Turnout		1,660	48.7	
Conservative hold		Swing		

=== Elections in 1920s ===
==== November 1920 ====
1920
Party	Candidate	Votes	%	±%
Conservative	J. Hill*	779*	36.7	−12.2
Independent	D. Gouldman	779	36.7	+13.1
Liberal	D. Quas-Cohen	564	26.6	−1.0
Majority		0	0.0	−21.3
Turnout		2,122	62.2	+13.5
Conservative hold		Swing		

* Two candidates having received 779 votes each, Hill was returned on the Alderman's casting vote

==== November 1921 ====
1921
Party	Candidate	Votes	%	±%
Independent	D. Gouldman	1,544	63.5	+26.8
Conservative	T. R. Hewlett*	887	36.5	0.2
Majority		657	27.0	
Turnout		2,431	72.1	+9.9
Independent gain from Conservative		Swing		

==== November 1922 ====
1922
Party	Candidate	Votes	%	±%
Conservative	J. Elliott*	1,074	46.9	+10.4
Liberal	P. I. Wigoder	840	36.6	N/A
Labour	F. Gregson	378	16.5	N/A
Majority		234	10.2	
Turnout		2,292	66.5	−5.6
Conservative hold		Swing		

==== November 1923 ====
1923
Party	Candidate	Votes	%	±%
Conservative	J. Hill*	976	52.7	+5.8
Liberal	P. I. Wigoder	876	47.3	+10.7
Majority		100	5.4	−4.8
Turnout		1,852		
Conservative hold		Swing		

==== November 1924 ====
1924
Party	Candidate	Votes	%	±%
Independent	D. Gouldman*	1,328	72.8	N/A
Labour	S. Herbert	496	27.2	N/A
Majority		832	45.6	
Turnout		1,824		
Independent hold		Swing		

==== November 1925 ====
1925
Party	Candidate	Votes	%	±%
Conservative	J. Elliott*	uncontested		
Conservative hold		Swing		

==== November 1926 ====
1926
Party	Candidate	Votes	%	±%
Conservative	J. Hill*	901	54.4	N/A
Labour	J. C. Leigh	755	45.6	N/A
Majority		146	8.8	N/A
Turnout		1,656	45.5	N/A
Conservative hold		Swing		

==== November 1927 ====
1927
Party	Candidate	Votes	%	±%
Independent	D. Gouldman*	1,659	88.5	N/A
Communist	G. W. Chandler	216	11.5	N/A
Majority		1,443	77.0	
Turnout		1,875	50.2	+4.7
Independent hold		Swing		

==== November 1928 ====
1928
Party	Candidate	Votes	%	±%
Conservative	J. Elliott*	1,067	65.7	N/A
Labour	P. Goldstone	558	34.3	N/A
Majority		509	31.4	
Turnout		1,625	43.3	−6.9
Conservative hold		Swing		

==== November 1929 ====
1929
Party	Candidate	Votes	%	±%
Liberal	A. S. Moss	770	43.7	N/A
Conservative	J. Hill*	682	38.7	−27.0
Labour	A. Eyres	312	17.6	−16.7
Majority		88	5.0	
Turnout		1,764	40.2	−3.1
Liberal gain from Conservative		Swing		

=== Elections in 1930s ===
==== November 1930 ====
1930
Party	Candidate	Votes	%	±%
Independent	D. Gouldman*	1,323	55.2	N/A
Liberal	J. E. Fitzsimons	657	27.4	−16.3
Labour	E. J. Mendel	415	17.4	−0.2
Majority		666	27.8	
Turnout		2,395		
Independent hold		Swing		

==== November 1931 ====
1931
Party	Candidate	Votes	%	±%
Conservative	J. Elliott*	1,027	50.2	N/A
Liberal	P. Smith	1,020	49.8	+22.4
Majority		7	0.4	
Turnout		2,047	47.3	
Conservative hold		Swing		

==== November 1932 ====
1932
Party	Candidate	Votes	%	±%
Liberal	A. S. Moss*	1,286	78.4	+28.6
Labour	H. Cohen	266	16.2	N/A
Communist	M. Jenkins	89	5.4	N/A
Majority		1,020	62.2	
Turnout		1,641		
Liberal hold		Swing		

==== November 1933 ====
1933
Party	Candidate	Votes	%	±%
Independent	D. Gouldman*	1,604	84.0	N/A
Labour	H. Cohen	182	9.5	−6.7
Communist	M. Jenkins	86	4.5	−0.9
Independent	T. A. Bardsley	38	2.0	N/A
Majority		1,422	74.5	
Turnout		1,910		
Independent hold		Swing		

==== November 1934 ====
1934
Party	Candidate	Votes	%	±%
Conservative	S. Holmes	1,011	47.9	N/A
Liberal	P. Smith	917	43.5	N/A
Communist	M. Jenkins	181	8.6	+4.1
Majority		94	4.4	
Turnout		2,109		
Conservative hold		Swing		

==== November 1935 ====
1935
Party	Candidate	Votes	%	±%
Liberal	A. S. Moss*	uncontested		
Liberal hold		Swing		

==== November 1936 ====
1936
Party	Candidate	Votes	%	±%
Independent	D. Gouldman*	1,310	75.4	N/A
Labour	H. Goldstone	427	24.6	N/A
Majority		883	50.8	N/A
Turnout		1,737		
Independent hold		Swing		

==== November 1937 ====
1937
Party	Candidate	Votes	%	±%
Conservative	S. Holmes*	842	63.0	N/A
Labour	E. A. Whitehead	495	37.0	+12.4
Majority		347	26.0	
Turnout		1,337		
Conservative hold		Swing		

==== March 1938 (by-election) ====
By-election: 10 March 1938
Party	Candidate	Votes	%	±%
Independent	A. Gouldman	792	38.6	N/A
Labour	E. A. Whitehead	498	24.3	−12.7
Liberal	P. I. Wigoder	414	20.2	N/A
Conservative	A. Levy	336	63.0	−46.6
Independent	T. A. Bardsley	10	0.5	N/A
Majority		294	14.3	
Turnout		2,050		
Independent hold		Swing		

==== November 1938 ====
1938
Party	Candidate	Votes	%	±%
Independent	A. Levy	1,337	48.5	N/A
Liberal	A. S. Moss*	1,091	39.6	N/A
Labour	T. J. Hill	329	11.9	−35.1
Majority		246	8.9	
Turnout		2,757		
Independent gain from Liberal		Swing		

==== December 1938 (by-election) ====
By-election: 14 December 1938
Party	Candidate	Votes	%	±%
Liberal	A. S. Moss	1,263	63.7	+24.1
Independent	P. Smith	454	22.9	N/A
Labour	T. J. Hill	266	13.4	+1.5
Majority		809	40.8	
Turnout		1,983		
Liberal gain from Independent		Swing		

=== Elections in 1940s ===
==== November 1945 ====
1945 (2 vacancies)
Party	Candidate	Votes	%	±%
Labour	B. S. Langton	1,237	46.2	+34.3
Labour	R. Finkel	1,174	43.9	+32.0
Liberal	M. Fidler	590	22.0	−17.6
Conservative	G. W. G. Fitzsimons	555	20.7	N/A
Conservative	A. Lees*	526	19.7	N/A
Independent	J. R. Gouldman	295	11.0	−37.5
Majority		584	21.9	
Turnout		2,677	43.3	
Labour gain from Conservative		Swing		
Labour gain from Conservative		Swing		

==== November 1946 ====
1946
Party	Candidate	Votes	%	±%
Labour	A. S. Moss*	1,544	55.1	+8.9
Independent	A. Gouldman	719	25.7	+14.7
Liberal	F. Charlesworth	281	10.0	−12.0
Communist	M. Jenkins	256	9.1	N/A
Majority		825	29.4	+7.5
Turnout		2,800		
Labour hold		Swing		

==== January 1947 (by-election) ====
By-election: 30 January 1947
Party	Candidate	Votes	%	±%
Labour	E. Mendell	809	46.7	−8.4
Conservative	G. W. G. Fitzsimons	732	42.2	N/A
Liberal	R. Frere	144	8.3	−1.7
Communist	M. Jenkins	49	2.8	−6.3
Majority		77	4.5	−24.9
Turnout		1,734		
Labour hold		Swing		

==== November 1947 ====
1947
Party	Candidate	Votes	%	±%
Labour	R. Finkel*	1,342	46.8	−8.3
Conservative	G. W. G. Fitzsimons	1,311	45.8	N/A
Communist	M. Jenkins	212	7.4	−2.0
Majority		31	1.0	−28.4
Turnout		2,865		
Labour hold		Swing		

==== May 1949 ====
1949
Party	Candidate	Votes	%	±%
Labour	B. S. Langton*	1,963	67.0	+20.2
Conservative	J. Brennan	969	33.0	−12.8
Majority		994	34.0	+33.0
Turnout		2,932		
Labour hold		Swing		

=== Elections in 1950s ===
==== May 1950 ====
1950 (new boundaries)
Party	Candidate	Votes	%	±%
Labour	E. Mendell*	2,836	74.6	
Conservative	G. R. Pankhurst	795	20.9	
Communist	M. I. Druck	171	4.5	
Majority		2,041	53.7	
Turnout		3,802		
Labour hold		Swing		

==== May 1951 ====
1951
Party	Candidate	Votes	%	±%
Labour	R. Finkel*	2,285	72.4	−2.2
Conservative	R. Rickless	691	21.9	+1.0
Communist	M. I. Druck	178	5.7	+1.2
Majority		1,594	50.5	−3.2
Turnout		3,054		
Labour hold		Swing		

==== May 1952 ====
1952
Party	Candidate	Votes	%	±%
Labour	B. S. Langton*	3,674	80.6	+8.2
Conservative	W. Hoyle-Smith	731	16.0	−5.9
Communist	M. I. Druck	153	3.4	−2.3
Majority		2,943	64.6	+14.1
Turnout		4,558		
Labour hold		Swing		

==== May 1953 ====
1953
Party	Candidate	Votes	%	±%
Labour	E. Mendell*	2,760	78.1	−2.5
Conservative	R. E. Talbot	591	16.7	+0.7
Communist	M. I. Druck	184	5.2	+1.8
Majority		2,169	61.4	−3.2
Turnout		3,535		
Labour hold		Swing		

==== May 1954 ====
1954
Party	Candidate	Votes	%	±%
Labour	R. Finkel*	2,473	76.2	−1.9
Conservative	R. E. Talbot	630	19.4	+2.7
Communist	M. I. Druck	143	4.4	−0.8
Majority		1,843	56.8	−4.6
Turnout		3,246		
Labour hold		Swing		

==== May 1955 ====
1955
Party	Candidate	Votes	%	±%
Labour	B. S. Langton*	2,361	73.4	−2.8
Conservative	E. Walmsley	703	21.9	+2.5
Communist	M. I. Druck	151	4.7	+0.3
Majority		1,658	51.5	−5.3
Turnout		3,215		
Labour hold		Swing		

==== May 1956 ====
1956
Party	Candidate	Votes	%	±%
Labour	E. Mendell*	1,668	79.4	+6.0
Conservative	F. Hargreaves	264	12.6	−9.3
Communist	M. I. Druck	168	8.0	+3.3
Majority		1,404	66.8	+15.3
Turnout		2,100		
Labour hold		Swing		

==== May 1957 ====
1957
Party	Candidate	Votes	%	±%
Labour	R. Finkel*	1,613	85.3	+5.9
Conservative	F. Hargreaves	189	10.0	−2.6
Communist	M. I. Druck	90	4.7	−3.3
Majority		1,424	75.3	+8.5
Turnout		1,892		
Labour hold		Swing		

==== May 1958 ====
1958
Party	Candidate	Votes	%	±%
Labour	B. S. Langton*	2,047	88.8	+3.5
Conservative	T. E. Dillon	172	7.5	−2.5
Communist	K. Bloch	85	3.7	−1.0
Majority		1,875	81.3	+6.0
Turnout		2,304		
Labour hold		Swing		

==== May 1959 ====
1959
Party	Candidate	Votes	%	±%
Labour	E. Mendell*	1,780	80.9	−7.9
Conservative	K. Edis	288	13.1	+7.1
Communist	A. Gadian	133	6.0	+2.7
Majority		1,492	67.8	−13.5
Turnout		2,201		
Labour hold		Swing		

=== Elections in 1960s ===
==== May 1960 ====
1960
Party	Candidate	Votes	%	±%
Labour	R. Finkel*	975	68.9	−12.0
Conservative	W. J. Pepper	305	21.5	+8.4
Communist	A. Gadian	136	9.6	+3.6
Majority		670	47.4	−20.4
Turnout		1,416		
Labour hold		Swing		

==== May 1961 ====
1961
Party	Candidate	Votes	%	±%
Labour	B. S. Langton*	1,618	80.1	+11.2
Conservative	K. Sharman	277	13.7	−7.8
Communist	K. Bloch	124	6.2	−3.4
Majority		1,341	66.4	+19.0
Turnout		2,019		
Labour hold		Swing		

==== May 1962 ====
1962
Party	Candidate	Votes	%	±%
Labour	E. Mendell*	1,163	77.3	−2.8
Conservative	W. J. Pepper	178	11.8	−1.9
Communist	K. Bloch	111	7.4	+1.2
Union Movement	A. Tunnacliffe	52	3.5	N/A
Majority		985	65.5	−0.9
Turnout		1,503		
Labour hold		Swing		

==== May 1963 ====
1963
Party	Candidate	Votes	%	±%
Labour	S. A. Ogden	1,490	79.7	+2.4
Conservative	S. Black	241	12.9	+1.1
Communist	K. Bloch	139	7.4	0
Majority		1,249	66.8	+1.3
Turnout		1,870		
Labour hold		Swing		

==== October 1963 (by-election) ====
By-election: 24 October 1963 (2 vacancies)
Party	Candidate	Votes	%	±%
Labour	M. Seigleman	1,474	83.2	+3.5
Labour	J. Davis	1,312	74.0	−5.7
Conservative	I. Black	277	15.6	+2.7
Conservative	C. Warburton	252	14.2	+1.3
Communist	K. Bloch	114	6.4	−1.0
Majority		1,035	58.4	−8.4
Turnout		1,772		
Labour hold		Swing		
Labour hold		Swing		

==== May 1964 ====
1964
Party	Candidate	Votes	%	±%
Labour	J. Davis*	960	77.7	−2.0
Conservative	R. J. Chronnell	176	14.2	+1.3
Communist	K. Bloch	100	8.1	+0.7
Majority		784	63.5	−3.3
Turnout		1,236		
Labour hold		Swing		

==== May 1965 ====
1965
Party	Candidate	Votes	%	±%
Labour	M. Seigleman*	1,139	77.1	−0.6
Conservative	J. T. Rollins	266	18.0	+3.8
Communist	K. Bloch	72	4.9	−3.2
Majority		873	59.1	−4.4
Turnout		1,477		
Labour hold		Swing		

==== March 1966 (by-election) ====
By-election: 3 March 1966
Party	Candidate	Votes	%	±%
Labour	R. F. Delahunty	940	80.8	+3.7
Conservative	J. E. Doniger	223	19.2	+1.2
Majority		717	61.6	+2.5
Turnout		1,163		
Labour hold		Swing		

==== May 1966 ====
1966
Party	Candidate	Votes	%	±%
Labour	S. H. Ogden*	653	69.9	−7.2
Conservative	G. R. Berry	153	16.4	−1.6
Communist	H. Ogden	128	13.7	+8.8
Majority		500	53.5	−5.6
Turnout		934		
Labour hold		Swing		

==== May 1967 ====
1967
Party	Candidate	Votes	%	±%
Labour	J. Davis*	681	64.5	−5.4
Conservative	A. R. Gallagher	280	26.5	+10.1
Communist	M. Jones	95	9.0	−4.7
Majority		401	38.0	−15.5
Turnout		1,056		
Labour hold		Swing		

==== May 1968 ====
1968
Party	Candidate	Votes	%	±%
Labour	R. F. Delahunty*	712	54.2	−10.3
Conservative	V. Taylor	535	40.8	+14.3
Communist	E. A. Whinney	66	5.0	−4.0
Majority		177	13.4	−24.6
Turnout		1,313		
Labour hold		Swing		

==== May 1969 ====
1969
Party	Candidate	Votes	%	±%
Labour	S. A. Ogden*	522	66.9	+12.7
Conservative	R. J. R. Lomas	212	27.2	−13.6
Communist	E. A. Whinney	46	5.9	+0.9
Majority		310	39.7	+26.3
Turnout		780		
Labour hold		Swing		

=== Elections in 1970s ===
==== May 1970 ====
1970
Party	Candidate	Votes	%	±%
Labour	J. Davis*	390	73.0	+6.1
Conservative	E. A. M. Walmsley	132	24.7	−2.5
Residents	L. H. F. Roberts	12	2.3	N/A
Majority		258	48.3	+8.6
Turnout		534		
Labour hold		Swing		

==== May 1971 ====
1971 (3 vacancies; new boundaries)
Party	Candidate	Votes	%	±%
Labour	R. F. Delahunty*	1,238	84.2	
Labour	S. A. Ogden*	1,235	84.0	
Labour	F. J. Balcombe*	1,223	83.2	
Conservative	J. Cartland	235	16.0	
Conservative	R. J. R. Lomas	213	14.5	
Conservative	K. West	192	13.1	
Communist	T. E. Keenan	75	5.1	
Majority		988	67.2	
Turnout		1,470		
Labour win (new seat)				
Labour win (new seat)				
Labour win (new seat)				

==== May 1972 ====
1972
Party	Candidate	Votes	%	±%
Labour	F. J. Balcombe*	843	84.6	+0.4
Conservative	P. A. Bradshaw	153	15.4	−0.6
Majority		690	69.2	+2.0
Turnout		996		
Labour hold		Swing		

==== May 1973 ====
1973 (3 vacancies; reorganisation)
Party	Candidate	Votes	%	±%
Labour	F. J. Balcombe*	721	72.2	−12.4
Labour	S. Ogden*	618	61.9	−22.7
Labour	J. B. Ogden*	612	61.3	−23.3
Liberal	J. Laslett	193	19.3	N/A
Liberal	C. Addison	171	17.1	N/A
Conservative	J. Carson	147	14.7	−0.7
Conservative	J. R. Cawley	132	13.2	−2.2
Conservative	W. Porter	116	11.6	−3.8
Majority		419	42.0	−27.2
Turnout		1,061	21.7	
Labour hold		Swing		
Labour hold		Swing		
Labour hold		Swing		

==== May 1975 ====
1975
Party	Candidate	Votes	%	±%
Labour	J. B. Ogden*	389	59.8	−8.1
Conservative	D. H. Philip	179	27.5	+13.7
Liberal	J. Laslett	82	12.6	−5.5
Majority		210	32.3	−17.4
Turnout		650		
Labour hold		Swing	-10.9	

==== May 1976 ====
1976
Party	Candidate	Votes	%	±%
Labour	S. Ogden*	628	63.9	+4.1
Conservative	D. H. Philip	261	26.6	−0.9
Liberal	K. D. Underhill	78	7.9	−4.7
Independent	P. Wragg	16	1.6	+1.6
Majority		367	37.3	+5.0
Turnout		983		
Labour hold		Swing	+2.5	

==== May 1978 ====
1978
Party	Candidate	Votes	%	±%
Labour	F. Balcombe*	843	63.1	−0.8
Conservative	S. R. Newth	416	31.1	+4.5
Liberal	M. A. Plesch	78	5.8	−2.1
Majority		427	32.0	−5.3
Turnout		1,337	28.2	
Labour hold		Swing	-2.6	

==== May 1979 ====
1979
Party	Candidate	Votes	%	±%
Labour	P. Karney	1,531	63.6	+0.5
Conservative	S. R. Newth	666	27.7	−3.4
Liberal	I. Wilde	211	8.8	+3.0
Majority		865	35.9	+4.0
Turnout		2,408	53.8	+25.6
Labour hold		Swing	+1.9	

=== Elections in 1980s ===
==== May 1980 ====
1980
Party	Candidate	Votes	%	±%
Labour	J. Bradley	894	77.5	+13.9
Conservative	P. Snell	192	16.7	−11.0
Liberal	I. Wilde	67	5.8	−3.0
Majority		702	60.9	+25.0
Turnout		1,153	26.4	−27.4
Labour hold		Swing	+12.4	

== See also ==
- Manchester City Council
- Manchester City Council elections
