= 1938 Manchester City Council election =

Local election in Manchester

- 1 November 1938

36 of 144 seats on Manchester City Council 73 seats needed for a majority
	First party	Second party	Third party
Party	Conservative	Labour	Liberal
Last election	16 seats, 42.7%	14 seats, 43.9%	4 seats, 10.8%
Seats before	63	52	21
Seats won	18	14	3
Seats after	67	51	19
Seat change	▲4	▼1	▼2
Popular vote	54,910	49,825	7,875
Percentage	46.7%	42.4%	6.7%
Swing	▲4.0%	▼1.5%	▼4.1%
	Fourth party
Party	Independent
Last election	1 seats, 1.5%
Seats before	4
Seats won	1
Seats after	5
Seat change	▲1
Popular vote	1,625
Percentage	1.4%
Swing	▼0.1%
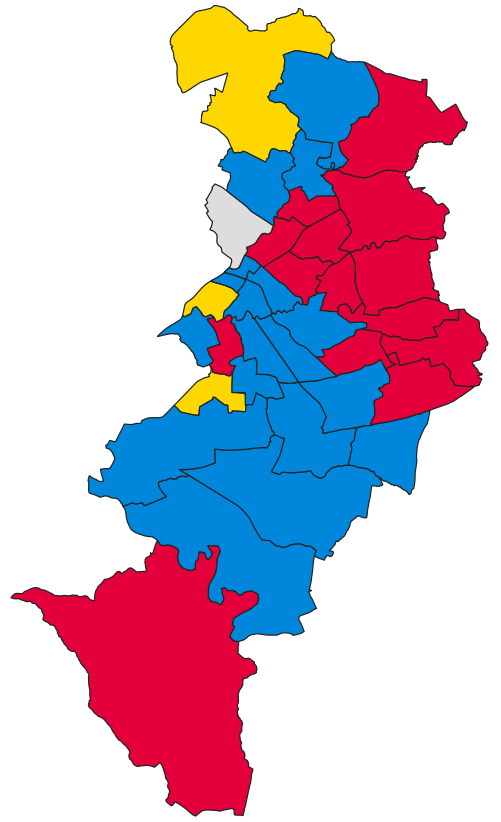
- Map of results of 1938 election
Leader of the Council before election
No overall control
Leader of the Council after election
No overall control

Elections to Manchester City Council were held on Tuesday, 1 November 1938. One third of the councillors seats were up for election, with each successful candidate to serve a three-year term of office.

Annual local elections were suspended from 1939 to 1945. Under the Local Elections and Register of Electors (Temporary Provisions) Act 1939 the term of office of all members of the council was extended by one year and casual vacancies among members of the council were filled by the choice of the council rather than by election. Local Elections and Register of Electors Acts of 1940, 1941, 1942, 1943, and 1944 each further extended the term of office of all members of the council by a year.

The council remained under no overall control.

== Election result ==
Party	Votes		Seats			Full Council	
Conservative Party	54,910 (46.7%)	▲4.0	18 (50.0%)	18 / 36	▲1	67 (46.5%)	67 / 144
Labour Party	49,825 (42.4%)	▼1.5	14 (38.9%)	14 / 36	▼1	51 (35.1%)	51 / 144
Liberal Party	7,875 (6.7%)	▼4.1	3 (8.3%)	3 / 36	▼2	19 (13.2%)	19 / 144
Independent	1,625 (1.4%)	▼0.1	1 (2.8%)	1 / 36	▲1	5 (3.5%)	5 / 144
Independent Labour	1,418 (1.2%)	▲1.2	0 (0.0%)	0 / 36	▼2	1 (0.7%)	1 / 144
Residents	1,220 (1.0%)	▼0.1	0 (0.0%)	0 / 36	Steady	1 (0.7%)	1 / 144
British Union	640 (0.5%)	N/A	0 (0.0%)	0 / 36	N/A	0 (0.0%)	0 / 144

=== Full council ===
↓
1	51	19	1	5	67

=== Aldermen ===
↓
1	10	9	1	15

=== Councillors ===
↓
41	10	1	4	52

== Ward results ==
=== All Saints' ===
All Saints'
Party	Candidate	Votes	%	±%
Conservative	R. S. Harper*	1,817	64.6	+3.6
Labour	E. A. Gower	968	34.4	−4.6
British Union	M. E. Pye	23	0.9	N/A
Residents	L. Whittington	3	0.1	N/A
Majority		849	30.2	+8.2
Turnout		2,811		
Conservative hold		Swing		

=== Ardwick ===
Ardwick
Party	Candidate	Votes	%	±%
Conservative	J. Dook	2,080	55.1	+2.1
Labour	J. M. Wharton*	1,648	43.6	−3.4
Independent	F. G. Hunt	48	1.3	N/A
Majority		432	11.5	+5.5
Turnout		3,776		
Conservative gain from Labour		Swing		

=== Beswick ===
Beswick
Party	Candidate	Votes	%	±%
Labour	H. Baldwin*	uncontested		
Labour hold		Swing		

=== Blackley ===
Blackley
Party	Candidate	Votes	%	±%
Conservative	S. Fitton*	2,628	57.8	N/A
Labour	C. C. Lamb	1,919	42.2	+5.0
Majority		709	15.6	
Turnout		4,547		
Conservative hold		Swing		

=== Bradford ===
Bradford
Party	Candidate	Votes	%	±%
Labour	E. E. Beavan*	uncontested		
Labour hold		Swing		

=== Cheetham ===
Cheetham
Party	Candidate	Votes	%	±%
Conservative	H. Lomax*	2,085	47.2	+2.2
Liberal	S. Needoff	1,333	30.2	−0.8
Labour	B. J. Gershman	998	22.6	−1.4
Majority		752	17.0	+3.0
Turnout		4,416		
Conservative hold		Swing		

=== Chorlton-cum-Hardy ===
Chorlton-cum-Hardy
Party	Candidate	Votes	%	±%
Conservative	H. Strange	5,632	74.9	+1.1
Labour	C. W. Jones	1,889	25.1	−1.1
Majority		3,743	49.8	+2.2
Turnout		7,521		
Conservative hold		Swing		

=== Collegiate Church ===
Collegiate Church
Party	Candidate	Votes	%	±%
Independent	A. Levy	1,337	48.5	N/A
Liberal	A. S. Moss*	1,091	39.6	N/A
Labour	T. J. Hill	329	11.9	−35.1
Majority		246	8.9	
Turnout		2,757		
Independent gain from Liberal		Swing		

=== Collyhurst ===
Collyhurst
Party	Candidate	Votes	%	±%
Labour	W. Johnston*	1,709	87.6	+22.3
British Union	F. Fowden	242	12.4	N/A
Majority		1,467	75.2	+44.6
Turnout		1,951		
Labour hold		Swing		

=== Crumpsall ===
Crumpsall
Party	Candidate	Votes	%	±%
Liberal	S. Meadowcroft*	2,969	69.0	N/A
Labour	R. B. Prain	1,336	31.0	−2.0
Majority		1,633	38.0	
Turnout		4,305		
Liberal hold		Swing		

=== Didsbury ===
Didsbury
Party	Candidate	Votes	%	±%
Conservative	W. White*	3,529	68.3	−4.9
Labour	T. Knowles	1,637	31.7	+4.9
Majority		1,892	36.6	−9.8
Turnout		5,166		
Conservative hold		Swing		

=== Exchange ===
Exchange
Party	Candidate	Votes	%	±%
Conservative	J. W. Coe	uncontested		
Conservative hold		Swing		

=== Gorton North ===
Gorton North
Party	Candidate	Votes	%	±%
Labour	S. H. Hitchbun*	uncontested		
Labour hold		Swing		

=== Gorton South ===
Gorton South
Party	Candidate	Votes	%	±%
Labour	T. H. Adams*	3,643	93.9	+21.2
British Union	J. Simmonds	236	6.1	N/A
Majority		3,407	87.8	+42.4
Turnout		3,879		
Labour hold		Swing		

=== Harpurhey ===
Harpurhey
Party	Candidate	Votes	%	±%
Conservative	E. Shaw	2,155	50.4	+0.8
Labour	J. Howard*	2,125	49.6	−0.8
Majority		30	0.8	
Turnout		4,280		
Conservative gain from Labour		Swing		

=== Levenshulme ===
Levenshulme
Party	Candidate	Votes	%	±%
Conservative	H. M. Emery*	2,640	62.2	N/A
Labour	B. de Courcey Ireland	1,602	37.8	+0.6
Majority		1,038	24.4	
Turnout		4,242		
Conservative hold		Swing		

=== Longsight ===
Longsight
Party	Candidate	Votes	%	±%
Conservative	W. P. Jackson*	3,031	59.3	+2.3
Labour	F. Walker	2,084	40.7	−2.3
Majority		947	18.6	+4.6
Turnout		5,115		
Conservative hold		Swing		

=== Medlock Street ===
Medlock Street
Party	Candidate	Votes	%	±%
Labour	J. Gorman*	1,742	51.7	−2.6
Conservative	A. Lees	1,566	46.5	+0.8
Residents	A. Robinson	60	1.8	N/A
Majority		176	5.2	−3.4
Turnout		3,368		
Labour hold		Swing		

=== Miles Platting ===
Miles Platting
Party	Candidate	Votes	%	±%
Labour	E. J. Howarth*	2,349	52.6	N/A
Conservative	T. A. Harrop	2,114	47.4	N/A
Majority		235	5.2	N/A
Turnout		4,463		
Labour hold		Swing		

=== Moss Side East ===
Moss Side East
Party	Candidate	Votes	%	±%
Conservative	J. E. Pheasey*	1,240	37.7	+4.1
Labour	W. Griffiths	1,164	35.4	+5.0
Residents	A. M. Edwards	884	26.9	−9.1
Majority		76	2.3	
Turnout		3,288		
Conservative hold		Swing		

=== Moss Side West ===
Moss Side West
Party	Candidate	Votes	%	±%
Liberal	H. Quinney*	1,763	60.2	N/A
Labour	E. C. Gates	925	31.6	−5.5
Residents	G. H. F. Earnshaw	240	8.2	N/A
Majority		838	28.6	
Turnout		2,928		
Liberal hold		Swing		

=== Moston ===
Moston
Party	Candidate	Votes	%	±%
Labour	F. Gregson*	3,315	53.6	N/A
Conservative	W. Hadfield	2,871	46.4	N/A
Majority		444	7.2	N/A
Turnout		6,186		
Labour hold		Swing		

=== New Cross ===
New Cross
Party	Candidate	Votes	%	±%
Labour	M. Knight	1,462	35.4	−32.1
Independent Labour	W. Hallows*	1,418	34.3	N/A
Conservative	B. H. Breeze	1,253	30.3	−2.2
Majority		44	1.1	−33.9
Turnout		4,133		
Labour gain from Independent Labour		Swing		

=== Newton Heath ===
Newton Heath
Party	Candidate	Votes	%	±%
Labour	A. Stevenson*	3,086	53.6	−2.7
Conservative	F. M. Grime	2,671	46.4	+2.7
Majority		415	7.2	−5.4
Turnout		5,757		
Labour hold		Swing		

=== Openshaw ===
Openshaw
Party	Candidate	Votes	%	±%
Labour	W. H. Oldfield*	uncontested		
Labour hold		Swing		

=== Oxford ===
Oxford
Party	Candidate	Votes	%	±%
Conservative	C. B. Walker*	uncontested		
Conservative hold		Swing		

=== Rusholme ===
Rusholme
Party	Candidate	Votes	%	±%
Conservative	A. T. Barratt*	2,590	65.6	−2.3
Labour	W. E. Harrison	1,357	34.4	+2.3
Majority		1,233	31.2	−15.8
Turnout		3,947		
Conservative hold		Swing		

=== St. Ann's ===
St. Ann's
Party	Candidate	Votes	%	±%
Conservative	R. A. Larmuth*	uncontested		
Conservative hold		Swing		

=== St. Clement's ===
St. Clement's
Party	Candidate	Votes	%	±%
Conservative	J. E. Fitzsimons*	uncontested		
Conservative hold		Swing		

=== St. George's ===
St. George's
Party	Candidate	Votes	%	±%
Conservative	J. H. Kearns	2,267	53.4	+2.4
Labour	J. G. Clapham*	1,840	43.3	−5.7
British Union	B. Talbot	139	3.3	N/A
Majority		427	10.1	+8.1
Turnout		4,246		
Conservative gain from Labour		Swing		

=== St. John's ===
St. John's
Party	Candidate	Votes	%	±%
Liberal	M. A. Gibbons*	uncontested		
Liberal hold		Swing		

=== St. Luke's ===
St. Luke's
Party	Candidate	Votes	%	±%
Conservative	J. Sharp	1,562	43.7	N/A
Labour	W. Gallacher	1,262	35.3	−4.2
Liberal	G. E. Jones	719	20.1	−40.4
Residents	F. Vincent-Wain	33	0.9	N/A
Majority		300	8.4	
Turnout		3,576		
Conservative gain from Liberal		Swing		

=== St. Mark's ===
St. Mark's
Party	Candidate	Votes	%	±%
Labour	C. Wood*	uncontested		
Labour hold		Swing		

=== St. Michael's ===
St. Michael's
Party	Candidate	Votes	%	±%
Labour	M. F. Griffin	1,362	46.4	−15.6
Conservative	E. Elliott	1,333	45.4	+7.4
Independent	F. Oates	240	8.2	N/A
Majority		29	1.0	−23.0
Turnout		2,935		
Labour gain from Independent Labour		Swing		

=== Withington ===
Withington
Party	Candidate	Votes	%	±%
Conservative	J. S. Hill*	5,492	60.7	+21.7
Labour	C. S. Hammersley	3,552	39.3	+13.2
Majority		1,940	21.4	+17.3
Turnout		9,044		
Conservative hold		Swing		

=== Wythenshawe ===
Wythenshawe
Party	Candidate	Votes	%	±%
Labour	E. A. Yarwood	4,522	50.9	+4.0
Conservative	H. Bentley*	4,354	49.1	−4.0
Majority		168	1.8	
Turnout		8,876		
Labour gain from Conservative		Swing		

== Aldermanic elections ==
=== Aldermanic election, 15 February 1939 ===
Caused by the death on 27 January 1939 of Alderman John Jones (Conservative, elected as an alderman by the council on 1 May 1912).

In his place, Councillor Leonard Cox (Labour, Beswick, elected 1 November 1921) was elected as an alderman by the council on 15 February 1939.

Party	Alderman	Ward	Term expires
Labour	Leonard Cox	Longsight	1940

=== Aldermanic election, 26 July 1939 ===
Caused by the death on 2 July 1939 of Alderman John Elliott (Conservative, elected as an alderman by the council on 5 September 1934).

In his place, Councillor Reginald Ashley Larmuth (Conservative, St. Ann's, elected 16 May 1922) was elected as an alderman by the council on 26 July 1939.

Party	Alderman	Ward	Term expires
Conservative	Reginald Ashley Larmuth	Bradford	1943

=== Aldermanic election, 4 October 1939 ===
Caused by the death on 27 September 1939 of Alderman Sir William Davy (Labour, elected as an alderman by the council on 1 May 1929).

In his place, Councillor James Cassie Kidd (Conservative, Cheetham, elected 19 December 1922) was elected as an alderman by the council on 4 October 1939.

Party	Alderman	Ward	Term expires
Conservative	James Cassie Kidd	Medlock Street	1940

=== Aldermanic elections, 9 November 1939 ===
Caused by the resignation on 9 November 1939 of Alderman Reginald Ashley Larmuth (Conservative, elected as an alderman by the council on 26 July 1939).

In his place, Councillor Harry Thorneycroft (Labour, Beswick, elected 2 July 1923) was elected as an alderman by the council on 9 November 1939.

Party	Alderman	Ward	Term expires
Labour	Harry Thorneycroft	Bradford	1949

Caused by the resignation on 9 November 1939 of Alderman George Oddy (Liberal, elected as an alderman by the council on 9 November 1927).

In his place, Councillor Thomas Ackroyd (Liberal, St. Luke's, elected 15 August 1923) was elected as an alderman by the council on 9 November 1939.

Party	Alderman	Ward	Term expires
Liberal	Thomas Ackroyd	Medlock Street	1946

=== Aldermanic election, 7 February 1940 ===
Caused by the death on 26 January 1940 of Alderman J. Harold Birley (Conservative, elected as an alderman by the council on 6 June 1928).

In his place, Councillor Charles Wood (Labour, St. Mark's, elected 1 November 1923) was elected as an alderman by the council on 7 February 1940.

Party	Alderman	Ward	Term expires
Labour	Charles Wood	Moss Side East	1949

=== Aldermanic election, 21 February 1940 ===
Caused by the death on 4 February 1940 of Alderman Lt. Col. George Westcott (Conservative, elected as an alderman by the council on 29 October 1931).

In his place, Councillor William Phillip Jackson (Conservative, Longsight, elected 1 November 1923) was elected as an alderman by the council on 21 February 1940.

Party	Alderman	Ward	Term expires
Conservative	William Phillip Jackson	St. John's	1949

=== Aldermanic election, 2 October 1940 ===
Caused by the resignation on 27 September 1940 of Alderman H. D. Judson (Independent, elected as an alderman by the council on 29 October 1931).

In his place, Councillor Ellis Green (Conservative, St. Ann's, elected 19 February 1924) was elected as an alderman by the council on 2 October 1940.

Party	Alderman	Ward	Term expires
Conservative	Ellis Green	Harpurhey	1946

=== Aldermanic election, 4 December 1940 ===
Caused by the death on 19 November 1940 of Alderman Richard Stephenson Harper (Conservative, elected as an alderman by the council on 6 June 1928).

In his place, Councillor Robert Griffith Edwards (Liberal, Rusholme, elected 1 November 1924) was elected as an alderman by the council on 4 December 1940.

Party	Alderman	Ward	Term expires
Liberal	Robert Griffith Edwards	Moston	1946

=== Aldermanic election, 5 February 1941 ===
Caused by the death on 1 January 1941 of Alderman Hermann Goldschmidt (Liberal, elected as an alderman by the council on 13 June 1906).

In his place, Councillor Thomas Walker (Labour, Gorton North, elected 1 November 1924) was elected as an alderman by the council on 5 February 1941.

Party	Alderman	Ward	Term expires
Labour	Thomas Walker	Oxford	1949

=== Aldermanic election, 4 February 1942 ===
Caused by the death on 14 January 1942 of Alderman Frederick Todd (Conservative, elected as an alderman by the council on 9 November 1922).

In his place, Councillor John Septimus Hill (Conservative, Withington, elected 1 November 1926) was elected as an alderman by the council on 4 February 1942.

Party	Alderman	Ward	Term expires
Conservative	John Septimus Hill	Crumpsall	1949

=== Aldermanic election, 4 March 1942 ===
Caused by the death on 14 February 1942 of Alderman Sir John Mathewson Watson (Liberal, elected as an alderman by the council on 3 January 1934).

In his place, Councillor Cyril Roylance de la Wyche (Liberal, Levenshulme, elected 7 July 1927) was elected as an alderman by the council on 4 March 1942.

Party	Alderman	Ward	Term expires
Liberal	Cyril Roylance de la Wyche	Newton Heath	1946

=== Aldermanic election, 3 June 1942 ===
Caused by the death on 30 April 1942 of Alderman James Bowie (Liberal, elected as an alderman by the council on 17 March 1920).

In his place, Councillor Sarah Laski (Liberal, Cheetham, elected 20 August 1929) was elected as an alderman by the council on 3 June 1942.

Party	Alderman	Ward	Term expires
Liberal	Sarah Laski	St. Clement's	1949

=== Aldermanic elections, 5 April 1944 ===
Caused by the death on 7 March 1944 of Alderman James Cassie Kidd (Conservative, elected as an alderman by the council on 4 October 1939).

In his place, Councillor Frank Farrington (Conservative, Moston, elected 1 November 1927) was elected as an alderman by the council on 5 April 1944.

Party	Alderman	Ward	Term expires
Conservative	Frank Farrington		1946

Caused by the death on 30 March 1944 of Alderman Charles Henry Barlow (Liberal, elected as an alderman by the council on 6 October 1937).

In his place, Councillor Bernard McManus (Liberal, St. Clement's, elected 15 October 1929) was elected as an alderman by the council on 5 April 1944.

Party	Alderman	Ward	Term expires
Liberal	Bernard McManus	Beswick	1946

=== Aldermanic election, 7 June 1944 ===
Caused by the death on 4 May 1944 of Alderman William Chapman (Conservative, elected as an alderman by the council on 7 October 1925).

In his place, Councillor H. M. Emery (Conservative, Levenshulme, elected 15 May 1928) was elected as an alderman by the council on 7 June 1944.

Party	Alderman	Ward	Term expires
Conservative	H. M. Emery		1946

=== Aldermanic elections, 6 September 1944 ===
Caused by the death on 6 August 1944 of Alderman George Hall (Independent Labour, elected as an alderman by the council on 9 November 1936).

In his place, Councillor Tom Regan (Labour, Gorton South, elected 2 November 1925) was elected as an alderman by the council on 6 September 1944.

Party	Alderman	Ward	Term expires
Labour	Tom Regan	St. Mark's	1946

Caused by the death on 18 August 1944 of Alderman Robert William Shepherd (Conservative, elected as an alderman by the council on 4 July 1934).

In his place, Councillor Samuel Fitton (Conservative, Blackley, elected 1 November 1935; previously 1928-34) was elected as an alderman by the council on 6 September 1944.

Party	Alderman	Ward	Term expires
Conservative	Samuel Fitton	Crumpsall	1946

=== Aldermanic election, 7 March 1945 ===
Caused by the death on 23 February 1945 of Alderman Sarah Laski (Liberal, elected as an alderman by the council on 3 June 1942).

In his place, Councillor Mary Gibbons (Liberal, St. John's, elected 1 November 1929) was elected as an alderman by the council on 7 March 1945.

Party	Alderman	Ward	Term expires
Liberal	Mary Gibbons	St. Clement's	1949

=== Aldermanic election, 4 July 1945 ===
Caused by the death on 4 June 1945 of Alderman Joseph Toole (Labour, elected as an alderman by the council on 6 March 1935).

In his place, Councillor T. H. Adams (Labour, Gorton South, elected 1 November 1926) was elected as an alderman by the council on 4 July 1945.

Party	Alderman	Ward	Term expires
Labour	T. H. Adams	Openshaw	1946

=== Aldermanic election, 5 September 1945 ===
Caused by the death on 5 August 1945 of Alderman William Jackson (Labour, elected as an alderman by the council on 2 October 1918).

In his place, Councillor Dr. Emrys Lloyd Jones (Labour, Medlock Street, elected 1 November 1927) was elected as an alderman by the council on 5 September 1945.

Party	Alderman	Ward	Term expires
Labour	Dr. Emrys Lloyd Jones		1949

== By-elections between 1938 and 1939 ==
=== Collegiate Church, 14 December 1938 ===
Caused by the resignation of Councillor Alexander Levy (Independent, Collegiate Church, elected 1 November 1938) on 25 November 1938.

Collegiate Church
Party	Candidate	Votes	%	±%
Liberal	A. S. Moss	1,263	63.7	+24.1
Independent	P. Smith	454	22.9	N/A
Labour	T. J. Hill	266	13.4	+1.5
Majority		809	40.8	
Turnout		1,983		
Liberal gain from Independent		Swing		
