= Blackley (ward) =

- Ward
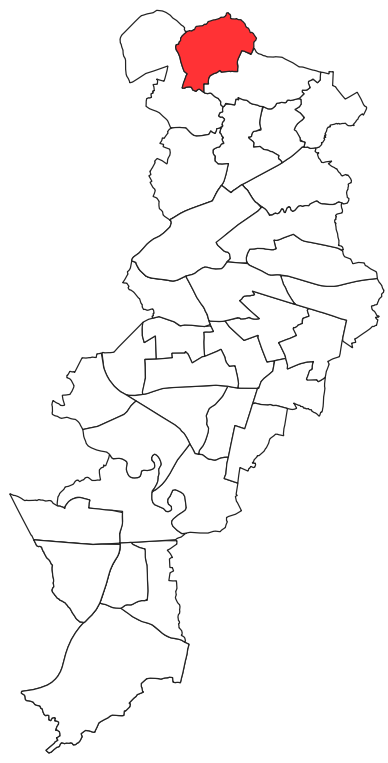
- Blackley ward (1994) within Manchester

- Coat of arms
- Country: United Kingdom
- Constituent country: England
- Region: North West England
- County: Greater Manchester
- Metropolitan borough: Manchester
- Created: November 1919
- Named for: Blackley

Government
  - Type: Unicameral
  - Body: Manchester City Council
- UK Parliamentary Constituency: Manchester Blackley

Blackley was an electoral division of Manchester City Council which was represented from 1919 until 2004. It covered the North Manchester suburb of Blackley.

== Overview ==
Blackley ward was created in 1919, from a portion of the former Blackley and Moston ward to the west of Boggart Hole Brook. City-wide boundary revisions in 1950 transferred Boothroydon from Crumpsall ward. Further revisions in 1971, removed Charlestown from the ward and incorporated Heaton Park into it. Following another revision in 1982, Heaton Park was transferred back to the Crumpsall ward. In 2004, the ward was abolished, and its remaining area became part of the new Higher Blackley ward.

For the entirety of its existence, the ward formed part of the Manchester Blackley Parliamentary constituency.

== Councillors ==
Election	Councillor	Councillor	Councillor
1919	J. D. Canavan (Lab)	R. Coppock (Lab)	A. Taylor (Lib)
1920	J. D. Canavan (Lab)	R. Coppock (Lab)	T. S. Williams (Lib)
1921	J. D. Canavan (Lab)	J. E. Littler (Con)	T. S. Williams (Lib)
November 1921	W. Bentley (Lib)	J. E. Littler (Con)	T. S. Williams (Lib)
1922	W. Bentley (Lib)	J. E. Littler (Con)	T. S. Williams (Lib)
1923	W. Bentley (Lib)	J. E. Littler (Con)	T. S. Williams (Lib)
1924	W. Bentley (Lib)	J. E. Littler (Con)	T. S. Williams (Lib)
1925	W. Bentley (Lib)	J. E. Littler (Con)	T. S. Williams (Lib)
1926	W. Bentley (Lib)	J. E. Littler (Con)	T. S. Williams (Lib)
1927	W. Bentley (Lib)	J. E. Littler (Con)	T. S. Williams (Lib)
1928	W. Bentley (Lib)	J. E. Littler (Con)	T. S. Williams (Lib)
1929	W. Bentley (Lib)	J. E. Littler (Con)	T. S. Williams (Lib)
1930	W. Bentley (Lib)	J. E. Littler (Con)	T. S. Williams (Lib)
1931	H. Lee (Lib)	J. E. Littler (Con)	T. S. Williams (Lib)
March 1932	H. Lee (Lib)	W. Makinson (Con)	T. S. Williams (Lib)
1932	H. Lee (Lib)	W. Makinson (Con)	T. S. Williams (Lib)
1933	H. Lee (Lib)	W. Makinson (Con)	T. S. Williams (Lib)
April 1934	H. Lee (Lib)	W. Makinson (Con)	H. W. Irwin (Lib)
1934	H. Lee (Lib)	W. Makinson (Con)	H. W. Irwin (Lib)
1935	H. Lee (Lib)	W. Makinson (Con)	S. Fitton (Con)
1936	H. Lee (Lib)	B. S. Vivante (Con)	S. Fitton (Con)
1937	H. Lee (Lib)	B. S. Vivante (Con)	S. Fitton (Con)
1938	H. Lee (Lib)	B. S. Vivante (Con)	S. Fitton (Con)
1945	H. Lee (Lib)	E. Cruse (Lab)	R. B. Prain (Lab)
1946	H. Lee (Lib)	E. Cruse (Lab)	R. B. Prain (Lab)
1947	H. Lee (Lib)	E. Cruse (Lab)	P. Chadwick (Con)
1949	H. Lee (Lib)	J. Hart (Con)	P. Chadwick (Con)
1950	J. A. Lynch (Con)	J. Hart (Con)	P. Chadwick (Con)
1951	J. A. Lynch (Con)	J. Hart (Con)	P. Chadwick (Con)
1952	J. A. Lynch (Con)	J. Hart (Con)	P. Chadwick (Con)
1953	J. A. Lynch (Con)	J. Hart (Con)	P. Chadwick (Con)
1954	J. A. Lynch (Con)	J. Hart (Con)	P. Chadwick (Con)
1955	J. A. Lynch (Con)	J. Hart (Con)	P. Chadwick (Con)
1956	J. A. Lynch (Con)	J. Hart (Con)	P. Chadwick (Con)
1957	J. A. Lynch (Con)	J. Hart (Con)	P. Chadwick (Con)
February 1958	J. A. Lynch (Con)	J. Hart (Con)	A. J. Fahey (Lab)
1958	J. A. Lynch (Con)	W. Burrows (Con)	A. J. Fahey (Lab)
1959	J. A. Lynch (Con)	W. Burrows (Con)	A. J. Fahey (Lab)
1960	J. A. Lynch (Con)	W. Burrows (Con)	E. D. Kirkup (Con)
1961	J. A. Lynch (Con)	W. Burrows (Con)	E. D. Kirkup (Con)
1962	J. A. Lynch (Con)	W. Burrows (Con)	E. D. Kirkup (Con)
1963	J. A. Lynch (Con)	W. Burrows (Con)	E. D. Kirkup (Con)
1964	J. A. Lynch (Con)	W. Burrows (Con)	E. D. Kirkup (Con)
1965	J. A. Lynch (Con)	W. Burrows (Con)	E. D. Kirkup (Con)
1966	J. A. Lynch (Con)	W. Burrows (Con)	E. D. Kirkup (Con)
1967	J. A. Lynch (Con)	W. Burrows (Con)	E. D. Kirkup (Con)
July 1967	W. Harper (Con)	W. Burrows (Con)	E. D. Kirkup (Con)
1968	W. Harper (Con)	W. Burrows (Con)	E. D. Kirkup (Con)
1969	W. Harper (Con)	W. Burrows (Con)	E. D. Kirkup (Con)
1970	W. Harper (Con)	W. Burrows (Con)	E. D. Kirkup (Con)
1971	A. A. Johnson (Lab)	J. E. Jackson (Lab)	J. I. Owen (Lab)
1972	A. A. Johnson (Lab)	J. E. Jackson (Lab)	J. I. Owen (Lab)
1973	J. I. Owen (Lab)	A. A. Johnson (Lab)	F. Hatton (Lab)
June 1974	J. I. Owen (Lab)	W. Risby (Lab)	S. Smith (Lab)
1975	J. I. Owen (Lab)	W. Risby (Lab)	H. P. Cummins (Con)
1976	J. I. Owen (Lab)	W. Risby (Lab)	H. P. Cummins (Con)
1978	P. Loxley (Con)	W. Risby (Lab)	H. P. Cummins (Con)
1979	P. Loxley (Con)	W. Risby (Lab)	E. Newman (Lab)
1980	P. Loxley (Con)	W. Risby (Lab)	E. Newman (Lab)
1980	G. Chadwick (Lab)	W. Risby (Lab)	E. Newman (Lab)
1982	G. Chadwick (Lab)	E. Newman (Lab)	E. Kelly (Lab)
1983	G. Chadwick (Lab)	E. Newman (Lab)	E. Kelly (Lab)
1984	G. Chadwick (Lab)	E. Newman (Lab)	E. Kelly (Lab)
May 1985	G. Chadwick (Lab)	K. Barnes (Lab)	E. Kelly (Lab)
1986	G. Chadwick (Lab)	K. Barnes (Lab)	E. Kelly (Lab)
1987	G. Chadwick (Lab)	K. Barnes (Lab)	E. Kelly (Lab)
1988	G. Chadwick (Lab)	K. Barnes (Lab)	E. Kelly (Lab)
1990	G. Chadwick (Lab)	K. Barnes (Lab)	E. Kelly (Lab)
1991	G. Chadwick (Lab)	K. Barnes (Lab)	E. Kelly (Lab)
1992	G. Chadwick (Lab)	K. Barnes (Lab)	E. Kelly (Lab)
1994	G. Chadwick (Lab)	K. Barnes (Lab)	E. Kelly (Lab)
1995	G. Chadwick (Lab)	K. Barnes (Lab)	E. Kelly (Lab)
1996	H. Lyons (Lab)	K. Barnes (Lab)	E. Kelly (Lab)
1998	H. Lyons (Lab)	K. Barnes (Lab)	E. Kelly (Lab)
1999	H. Lyons (Lab)	K. Barnes (Lab)	A. Trotman (Lab)
2000	H. Lyons (Lab)	K. Barnes (Lab)	A. Trotman (Lab)
2002	H. Lyons (Lab)	K. Barnes (Lab)	A. Trotman (Lab)
2003	H. Lyons (Lab)	K. Barnes (Lab)	A. Trotman (Lab)

== Elections ==
=== Elections in 1910s ===
==== November 1919 ====
1919 (3 vacancies)
Party	Candidate	Votes	%	±%
Labour	J. D. Canavan	1,767	53.8	
Labour	R. Coppock	1,751	53.3	
Liberal	A. Taylor*	1,180	35.9	
Co-operative Party	W. Holden	1,090	33.2	
Conservative	J. Lees	1,082	32.9	
Conservative	R. H. Morris	1,034	31.5	
Liberal	T. S. Williams*	1,000	30.5	
Conservative	J. W. Howarth	947	28.8	
Majority		90	2.7	
Turnout		3,284	41.9	
Labour win (new seat)				
Labour win (new seat)				
Liberal win (new seat)				

=== Elections in 1920s ===
==== November 1920 ====
1920
Party	Candidate	Votes	%	±%
Liberal	T. S. Williams	2,014	69.7	+33.8
Co-operative Party	W. Holden	874	30.3	−2.9
Majority		1,140	39.4	+36.7
Turnout		2,888	36.9	−5.0
Liberal hold		Swing		

==== November 1921 ====
1921
Party	Candidate	Votes	%	±%
Conservative	J. E. Littler	2,651	66.5	N/A
Labour	A. Robinson	1,333	33.5	N/A
Majority		1,318	33.0	
Turnout		3,984	51.1	+14.2
Conservative gain from Labour		Swing		

==== November 1921 (by-election) ====
By-election: 8 November 1921
Party	Candidate	Votes	%	±%
Liberal	W. Bentley	2,302	68.6	N/A
Labour	E. Whiteley	1,054	31.4	−2.1
Majority		1,248	37.2	
Turnout		3,356		
Liberal gain from Labour		Swing		

==== November 1922 ====
1922
Party	Candidate	Votes	%	±%
Liberal	W. Bentley*	uncontested		
Liberal hold		Swing		

==== November 1923 ====
1923
Party	Candidate	Votes	%	±%
Liberal	T. S. Williams*	uncontested		
Liberal hold		Swing		

==== November 1924 ====
1924
Party	Candidate	Votes	%	±%
Conservative	J. E. Littler*	2,918	68.2	N/A
Labour	W. R. Watson	1,360	31.8	N/A
Majority		1,558	36.4	N/A
Turnout		4,278		
Conservative hold		Swing		

==== November 1925 ====
1925
Party	Candidate	Votes	%	±%
Liberal	W. Bentley*	3,038	65.9	N/A
Labour	F. Gregson	1,570	34.1	+2.3
Majority		1,468	31.8	
Turnout		4,608	51.1	
Liberal hold		Swing		

==== November 1926 ====
1926
Party	Candidate	Votes	%	±%
Liberal	T. S. Williams*	2,940	67.9	+2.0
Labour	W. Slack	1,389	32.1	−2.0
Majority		1,551	35.8	+4.0
Turnout		4,329	46.9	−4.2
Liberal hold		Swing		

==== November 1927 ====
1927
Party	Candidate	Votes	%	±%
Conservative	J. E. Littler*	uncontested		
Conservative hold		Swing		

==== November 1928 ====
1928
Party	Candidate	Votes	%	±%
Liberal	W. Bentley*	2,714	61.3	N/A
Labour	W. Slack	1,536	34.7	N/A
Residents	J. A. P. Holmes	175	4.0	N/A
Majority		1,178	26.6	N/A
Turnout		4,425	45.9	N/A
Liberal hold		Swing		

==== November 1929 ====
1929
Party	Candidate	Votes	%	±%
Liberal	T. S. Williams*	2,255	67.3	+6.0
Labour	J. Gandy-Bewick	1,094	32.7	−2.0
Majority		1,161	34.6	+8.0
Turnout		3,349	32.4	−13.5
Liberal hold		Swing		

=== Elections in 1930s ===
==== November 1930 ====
1930
Party	Candidate	Votes	%	±%
Conservative	J. E. Littler*	2,674	67.7	N/A
Labour	W. Collingson	1,278	32.3	−0.4
Majority		1,396	35.4	
Turnout		3,952		
Conservative hold		Swing		

==== November 1931 ====
1931
Party	Candidate	Votes	%	±%
Liberal	H. Lee	3,600	74.4	N/A
Labour	W. Collingson	1,241	25.6	−6.7
Majority		2,359	48.8	
Turnout		4,841	48.2	
Liberal hold		Swing		

==== March 1932 (by-election) ====
By-election: 1 March 1931
Party	Candidate	Votes	%	±%
Conservative	W. Makinson	1,834	71.1	N/A
Labour	W. Collingson	745	28.9	+3.3
Majority		1,089	42.2	
Turnout		2,579	25.7	−22.5
Conservative hold		Swing		

==== November 1932 ====
1932
Party	Candidate	Votes	%	±%
Liberal	T. S. Williams*	2,163	62.7	−11.7
Labour	W. Collingson	1,287	37.3	+11.7
Majority		876	25.4	−23.4
Turnout		3,450		
Liberal hold		Swing		

==== November 1933 ====
1933
Party	Candidate	Votes	%	±%
Conservative	W. Makinson*	2,202	57.2	N/A
Labour	W. Collingson	1,650	42.8	+5.5
Majority		552	14.4	
Turnout		3,852		
Conservative hold		Swing		

==== April 1934 (by-election) ====
By-election: 19 April 1934
Party	Candidate	Votes	%	±%
Liberal	H. W. Irwin	1,736	56.3	N/A
Labour	W. Collingson	1,346	43.7	+0.9
Majority		390	12,6	
Turnout		3,082		
Liberal hold		Swing		

==== November 1934 ====
1934
Party	Candidate	Votes	%	±%
Liberal	H. Lee*	2,517	63.8	N/A
Labour	T. Sheard	1,431	36.2	−6.6
Majority		1,086	27.6	
Turnout		3,948		
Liberal hold		Swing		

==== November 1935 ====
1935
Party	Candidate	Votes	%	±%
Conservative	S. Fitton	2,564	50.4	N/A
Labour	H. Footit	1,611	31.7	−4.5
Liberal	W. S. Booth	908	17.9	−45.9
Majority		953	18.7	
Turnout		5,083		
Conservative gain from Liberal		Swing		

==== November 1936 ====
1936
Party	Candidate	Votes	%	±%
Conservative	B. S. Vivante	2,340	54.2	+3.8
Labour	W. Footit	1,977	45.8	+14.1
Majority		363	8.4	−10.3
Turnout		4,317		
Conservative hold		Swing		

==== November 1937 ====
1937
Party	Candidate	Votes	%	±%
Liberal	H. Lee*	2,930	62.8	N/A
Labour	W. Footit	1,739	37.2	−8.6
Majority		1,191	25.6	
Turnout		4,669		
Liberal hold		Swing		

==== November 1938 ====
1938
Party	Candidate	Votes	%	±%
Conservative	S. Fitton*	2,628	57.8	N/A
Labour	C. C. Lamb	1,919	42.2	+5.0
Majority		709	15.6	
Turnout		4,547		
Conservative hold		Swing		

=== Elections in 1940s ===
==== November 1945 ====
1945 (2 vacancies)
Party	Candidate	Votes	%	±%
Labour	E. Cruse	3,898	43.8	+1.6
Labour	R. B. Prain	3,821	43.0	+0.8
Conservative	P. Chadwick*	3,637	40.9	−16.9
Conservative	G. W. Bryant	3,426	38.5	−19.3
Liberal	J. H. Culley	1,358	15.3	N/A
Liberal	S. Critchley	1,246	14.0	N/A
Majority		184	2.1	
Turnout		8,893	44.2	
Labour gain from Conservative		Swing		
Labour gain from Conservative		Swing		

==== November 1946 ====
1946
Party	Candidate	Votes	%	±%
Liberal	H. Lee*	5,606	61.8	+46.5
Labour	J. Howard	3,471	38.2	−5.6
Majority		2,135	23.6	
Turnout		9,077		
Liberal hold		Swing		

==== November 1947 ====
1947
Party	Candidate	Votes	%	±%
Conservative	P. Chadwick	6,763	51.4	N/A
Labour	R. B. Prain*	5,206	39.6	+1.4
Liberal	P. Critchley	1,182	9.0	−52.8
Majority		1,557	11.8	
Turnout		13,151		
Conservative gain from Labour		Swing		

==== May 1949 ====
1949
Party	Candidate	Votes	%	±%
Conservative	J. Hart	5,765	46.1	−5.3
Labour	E. Cruse*	5,077	40.6	+1.0
Liberal	R. Frere	1,537	12.3	+3.3
Communist	M. Cohen	133	1.0	N/A
Majority		688	5.5	−6.3
Turnout		12,512		
Conservative gain from Labour		Swing		

=== Elections in 1950s ===
==== May 1950 ====
1950 (new boundaries)
Party	Candidate	Votes	%	±%
Conservative	J. A. Lynch	4,668	57.0	
Labour	E. Cruse	3,528	43.0	
Majority		1,140	14.0	
Turnout		8,196		
Conservative gain from Liberal		Swing		

==== May 1951 ====
1951
Party	Candidate	Votes	%	±%
Conservative	P. Chadwick*	4,804	65.0	+8.0
Labour	H. Britton	2,587	35.0	−8.0
Majority		2,217	30.0	+16.0
Turnout		7,391		
Conservative hold		Swing		

==== May 1952 ====
1952
Party	Candidate	Votes	%	±%
Conservative	J. Hart*	4,237	50.2	−14.8
Labour	E. Dell	4,195	49.8	+14.8
Majority		42	0.4	−29.6
Turnout		8,432		
Conservative hold		Swing		

==== May 1953 ====
1953
Party	Candidate	Votes	%	±%
Conservative	J. A. Lynch*	4,672	56.2	+6.0
Labour	E. Dell	3,639	43.8	−6.0
Majority		1,033	12.4	+12.0
Turnout		8,311		
Conservative hold		Swing		

==== May 1954 ====
1954
Party	Candidate	Votes	%	±%
Conservative	P. Chadwick*	4,142	58.3	+2.1
Labour	W. Lister	2,960	41.7	−2.1
Majority		1,182	16.6	+4.2
Turnout		7,102		
Conservative hold		Swing		

==== May 1955 ====
1955
Party	Candidate	Votes	%	±%
Conservative	J. Hart*	4,546	63.5	+5.2
Labour	W. Lister	2,615	36.5	−5.2
Majority		1,931	27.0	+10.4
Turnout		7,161		
Conservative hold		Swing		

==== May 1956 ====
1956
Party	Candidate	Votes	%	±%
Conservative	J. A. Lynch*	3,541	59.3	−4.2
Labour	A. J. Fahey	2,431	40.7	+4.2
Majority		1,110	18.6	−8.4
Turnout		5,972		
Conservative hold		Swing		

==== May 1957 ====
1957
Party	Candidate	Votes	%	±%
Conservative	P. Chadwick*	3,301	56.2	−3.1
Labour	A. J. Fahey	2,571	43.8	+3.1
Majority		730	12.4	−6.2
Turnout		5,872		
Conservative hold		Swing		

==== February 1958 (by-election) ====
By-election: 20 February 1958
Party	Candidate	Votes	%	±%
Labour	A. J. Fahey	2,813	54.7	+10.9
Conservative	W. Burrows	2,326	45.3	−10.9
Majority		487	9.4	
Turnout		5,139		
Labour gain from Conservative		Swing		

==== May 1958 ====
1958
Party	Candidate	Votes	%	±%
Conservative	W. Burrows	3,193	51.3	−4.9
Labour	L. Kelly	3,032	48.7	+4.9
Majority		161	2.6	−9.8
Turnout		6,225		
Conservative hold		Swing		

==== May 1959 ====
1959
Party	Candidate	Votes	%	±%
Conservative	J. A. Lynch*	3,398	47.6	−3.7
Labour	E. McGinty	2,459	34.4	−14.3
Liberal	D. A. Green	1,281	18.0	N/A
Majority		939	13.2	+10.6
Turnout		7,138		
Conservative hold		Swing		

=== Elections in 1960s ===
==== May 1960 ====
1960
Party	Candidate	Votes	%	±%
Conservative	E. D. Kirkup	3,046	54.2	+7.6
Labour	A. J. Fahey*	1,774	31.6	−2.8
Liberal	W. Wren	799	14.2	−3.8
Majority		1,272	22.6	+9.4
Turnout		5,619		
Conservative gain from Labour		Swing		

==== May 1961 ====
1961
Party	Candidate	Votes	%	±%
Conservative	W. Burrows*	2,912	47.9	−6.3
Labour	S. N. M. Moxley	1,834	30.2	−1.4
Liberal	W. Wren	1,327	21.9	+7.7
Majority		1,078	17.7	−4.9
Turnout		6,073		
Conservative hold		Swing		

==== May 1962 ====
1962
Party	Candidate	Votes	%	±%
Conservative	J. A. Lynch*	2,763	42.5	−5.4
Labour	S. N. M. Moxley	1,945	29.9	−0.3
Liberal	W. Wren	1,656	25.5	+3.6
Communist	I. W. Luft	137	2.1	N/A
Majority		818	12.6	−5.1
Turnout		6,501		
Conservative hold		Swing		

==== May 1963 ====
1963
Party	Candidate	Votes	%	±%
Conservative	E. D. Kirkup*	2,327	40.4	−2.1
Labour	S. N. M. Moxley	2,112	36.7	+6.8
Liberal	W. Wren	1,314	22.8	−2.7
Majority		215	3.7	−8.9
Turnout		5,753		
Conservative hold		Swing		

==== May 1964 ====
1964
Party	Candidate	Votes	%	±%
Conservative	W. Burrows*	2,590	42.2	+1.8
Labour	A. Haslam	2,314	37.7	+1.0
Liberal	M. F. Giblin	1,154	18.8	−4.0
Communist	I. W. Luft	81	1.3	N/A
Majority		276	4.5	+0.8
Turnout		6,139		
Conservative hold		Swing		

==== May 1965 ====
1965
Party	Candidate	Votes	%	±%
Conservative	J. A. Lynch*	2,938	52.1	+9.9
Labour	S. Rowe	1,722	30.6	−7.1
Liberal	M. F. Giblin	879	15.6	−3.2
Communist	I. W. Luft	97	1.7	+0.4
Majority		1,216	21.5	+17.0
Turnout		5,636		
Conservative hold		Swing		

==== May 1966 ====
1966
Party	Candidate	Votes	%	±%
Conservative	E. D. Kirkup*	2,666	55.8	+3.7
Labour	R. Pickering	1,993	41.7	+11.1
Communist	I. W. Luft	119	2.5	+0.8
Majority		673	14.1	−7.4
Turnout		4,778		
Conservative hold		Swing		

==== May 1967 ====
1967
Party	Candidate	Votes	%	±%
Conservative	W. Burrows*	2,825	69.0	+13.2
Labour	A. E. Halliday	803	19.6	−22.1
Liberal	J. M. Ashley	395	9.6	N/A
Communist	I. W. Luft	73	1.8	−0.7
Majority		2,022	49.4	+35.3
Turnout		4,096		
Conservative hold		Swing		

==== July 1967 (by-election) ====
By-election: 13 July 1967
Party	Candidate	Votes	%	±%
Conservative	W. Harper	2,248	66.0	−3.0
Labour	A. E. Halliday	795	23.3	+3.7
Liberal	J. M. Ashley	364	10.7	+1.1
Majority		1,453	42.7	−6.7
Turnout		3,407		
Conservative hold		Swing		

==== May 1968 ====
1968
Party	Candidate	Votes	%	±%
Conservative	W. Harper*	2,798	72.0	+3.0
Labour	A. E. Halliday	623	16.0	−3.6
Liberal	J. M. Ashley	463	11.9	+2.3
Majority		2,175	56.0	+6.6
Turnout		3,884		
Conservative hold		Swing		

==== May 1969 ====
1969
Party	Candidate	Votes	%	±%
Conservative	E. D. Kirkup*	2,503	62.4	−9.6
Labour	A. E. Bowden	752	18.7	+2.7
Liberal	J. M. Ashley	701	17.5	+5.6
Communist	I. W. Luft	57	1.4	N/A
Majority		1,751	43.6	−12.4
Turnout		4,013		
Conservative hold		Swing		

=== Elections in 1970s ===
==== May 1970 ====
1970
Party	Candidate	Votes	%	±%
Conservative	W. Burrows*	2,073	46.8	−15.6
Labour	D. Cox	1,836	41.5	+22.8
Liberal	J. M. Ashley	520	11.7	−5.8
Majority		237	5.3	−38.4
Turnout		4,429		
Conservative hold		Swing		

==== May 1971 ====
1971 (3 vacancies; new boundaries)
Party	Candidate	Votes	%	±%
Labour	A. A. Johnson	3,396	68.1	
Labour	J. E. Jackson	3,344	67.0	
Labour	J. I. Owen	3,280	65.7	
Conservative	E. D. Kirkup*	1,688	33.8	
Conservative	D. F. Silverman*	1,554	31.1	
Conservative	N. Pritchard*	1,547	31.0	
Communist	I. W. Luft	157	3.1	
Majority		1,592	31.9	
Turnout		4,989		
Labour win (new seat)				
Labour win (new seat)				
Labour win (new seat)				

==== May 1972 ====
1972
Party	Candidate	Votes	%	±%
Labour	J. I. Owen*	2,129	60.0	−8.1
Conservative	D. F. Silverman	1,417	40.0	+6.2
Majority		712	20.0	−11.9
Turnout		3,546		
Labour hold		Swing		

==== May 1973 ====
1973 (3 vacancies; reorganisation)
Party	Candidate	Votes	%	±%
Labour	J. I. Owen*	1,859	56.2	−3.8
Labour	A. A. Johnson*	1,850	56.0	−4.0
Labour	F. Hatton*	1,740	52.6	−7.4
Conservative	J. Yates	1,380	41.8	+1.8
Conservative	D. G. Sparrow	1,350	40.8	+0.8
Conservative	H. P. Cummins	1,228	37.2	−2.8
Majority		360	10.9	−9.1
Turnout		3,305		
Labour hold		Swing		
Labour hold		Swing		
Labour hold		Swing		

==== June 1974 (by-election) ====
By-election: 27 June 1974 (2 vacancies)
Party	Candidate	Votes	%	±%
Labour	B. Risby	1,975	54.5	−2.9
Labour	S. Smith	1,908		
Conservative	J. Hood	1,354	37.4	−5.2
Conservative	P. Cummins	1,340		
Liberal	C. Cloran	292	8.0	+8.0
Liberal	J. Laslett	282		
Majority		554	17.1	+2.3
Turnout		3,621		
Labour hold		Swing		
Labour hold		Swing	+1.1	

==== May 1975 ====
1975
Party	Candidate	Votes	%	±%
Conservative	H. P. Cummins	1,532	53.7	+11.1
Labour	S. Smith*	1,321	46.3	−11.1
Majority		211	7.4	−7.4
Turnout		2,853		
Conservative gain from Labour		Swing	+11.1	

==== May 1976 ====
1976
Party	Candidate	Votes	%	±%
Labour	W. Risby*	2,482	54.3	+8.0
Conservative	J. Yates	2,092	45.7	−8.0
Majority		390	8.5	+1.1
Turnout		4,574		
Labour hold		Swing	+8.0	

==== May 1978 ====
1978
Party	Candidate	Votes	%	±%
Conservative	P. Loxley	2,508	52.2	+6.5
Labour	J. I. Owen*	2,143	44.6	−9.7
Liberal	V. Towers	153	3.2	+3.2
Majority		365	7.6	−0.9
Turnout		4,804	43.2	
Conservative gain from Labour		Swing	+8.1	

==== May 1979 ====
1979
Party	Candidate	Votes	%	±%
Labour	Eddie Newman	3,936	48.3	+3.7
Conservative	H. P. Cummins*	3,571	43.8	−8.4
Liberal	J. Ashley	643	7.9	+4.7
Majority		365	4.5	−3.1
Turnout		8,150	74.8	+31.6
Labour gain from Conservative		Swing	+6.0	

=== Elections in 1980s ===
==== May 1980 ====
1980
Party	Candidate	Votes	%	±%
Labour	W. Risby*	2,910	61.0	+12.7
Conservative	H. P. Cummins	1,659	34.8	−9.0
Liberal	N. Towers	201	4.2	−3.7
Majority		1,251	26.2	+21.7
Turnout		4,770	42.9	−31.9
Labour hold		Swing	+10.8	

==== April 1981 (by-election) ====
By-election: 2 April 1981
Party	Candidate	Votes	%	±%
Labour	George Chadwick	2,287	61.5	+0.5
Conservative	Valerie Hall	922	24.8	−10.0
Liberal	John Cookson	510	13.7	+9.5
Majority		1,365	36.7	+10.2
Turnout		3,719	33.4	−9.5
Labour gain from Conservative		Swing	+5.2	

==== May 1982 ====
1982 (3 vacancies; new boundaries)
Party	Candidate	Votes	%	±%
Labour	George Chadwick*	2,307	56.0	
Labour	Edward Newman*	2,210	53.6	
Labour	Eileen Kelly	2,159	52.4	
Conservative	Valerie Hall	1,097	26.6	
Conservative	Paul Soden	979	23.8	
Conservative	Brian Whaite	961	23.3	
Liberal	Norman Towers	528	12.8	
Liberal	John Cookson	517	12.5	
Liberal	David Gordon	507	12.3	
Majority		1,062	25.8	
Turnout		4,121	41.1	
Labour win (new seat)				
Labour win (new seat)				
Labour win (new seat)				

==== May 1983 ====
1983
Party	Candidate	Votes	%	±%
Labour	Eileen Kelly*	2,682	62.0	+3.3
Conservative	Gerry Carey	1,238	28.6	+0.7
Liberal	David Gordon	408	9.4	−4.0
Majority		1,444	33.4	+2.6
Turnout		4,328		
Labour hold		Swing	+1.3	

==== May 1984 ====
1984
Party	Candidate	Votes	%	±%
Labour	Eddie Newman*	2,522	66.2	+4.2
Conservative	Y. Whitehurst	904	23.7	−4.9
Liberal	L. Gordon	386	10.1	+0.7
Majority		1,618	42.4	+9.0
Turnout		3,812		
Labour hold		Swing	+4.5	

==== May 1985 (by-election) ====
By-election: 3 May 1985
Party	Candidate	Votes	%	±%
Labour	K. Barnes	2,314	56.9	−9.3
Conservative	K. Potter	870	21.4	−2.3
Liberal	J. Cookson	801	19.7	+9.6
National Front	B. Nylan	79	1.9	N/A
Majority		1,444	35.5	−6.9
Turnout		4,064		
Labour hold		Swing		

==== May 1986 ====
1986
Party	Candidate	Votes	%	±%
Labour	G. Chadwick*	2,379	65.6	−0.6
Conservative	K. Potter	744	20.5	−3.2
Liberal	J. Cookson	455	12.5	+2.4
National Front	C. Ballantyne	49	1.4	+1.4
Majority		1,635	45.1	+2.7
Turnout		3,627		
Labour hold		Swing	+1.3	

==== May 1987 ====
1987
Party	Candidate	Votes	%	±%
Labour	Eileen Kelly*	1,879	45.2	−20.4
Conservative	Kevin Potter	1,366	32.9	+12.4
SDP	John Cookson	910	21.9	+9.4
Majority		513	12.3	−32.8
Turnout		4,155		
Labour hold		Swing	-16.4	

==== May 1988 ====
1988
Party	Candidate	Votes	%	±%
Labour	K. Barnes	2,290	61.1	+15.9
Conservative	F. J. R. Lomas	1,117	29.8	−3.1
SLD	J. Cookson	340	9.1	−12.8
Majority		1,173	31.3	+19.0
Turnout		3,747		
Labour hold		Swing	+9.5	

=== Elections in 1990s ===
==== May 1990 ====
1990
Party	Candidate	Votes	%	±%
Labour	G. Chadwick*	2,497	66.7	+5.6
Conservative	K. A. Potter	788	21.1	−8.7
Liberal Democrats	V. Towers	262	7.0	−2.1
Green	B. A. Lewis	195	5.2	+5.2
Majority		1,709	45.7	+14.4
Turnout		3,742		
Labour hold		Swing	+7.1	

==== May 1991 ====
1991
Party	Candidate	Votes	%	±%
Labour	E. Kelly*	1,872	56.3	−10.4
Conservative	L. M. Brandolani	786	23.6	+2.5
Liberal Democrats	A. D. Kay	669	20.1	+13.1
Majority		1,086	32.6	−13.1
Turnout		3,327	36.3	
Labour hold		Swing	-6.4	

==== May 1992 ====
1992
Party	Candidate	Votes	%	±%
Labour	K. Barnes*	1,228	54.4	−1.9
Conservative	K. Potter	792	35.1	+11.5
Liberal Democrats	K. Wadsworth	239	10.6	−9.5
Majority		436	19.3	−13.3
Turnout		2,259		
Labour hold		Swing	-6.7	

==== May 1994 ====
1994
Party	Candidate	Votes	%	±%
Labour	G. Chadwick*	2,144	74.9	+20.5
Conservative	V. Clarke	380	13.3	−21.8
Liberal Democrats	K. Wadsworth	339	11.8	+1.2
Majority		1,764	61.6	+42.3
Turnout		2,863		
Labour hold		Swing	+21.1	

==== May 1995 ====
1995
Party	Candidate	Votes	%	±%
Labour	Eileen Kelly*	1,953	76.5	+1.6
Conservative	A. Slack	307	12.0	−1.3
Liberal Democrats	Peter Matthews	246	9.6	−2.2
Independent	Cath Hall	46	1.8	+1.8
Majority		1,646	64.5	+2.9
Turnout		2,552		
Labour hold		Swing	+1.4	

==== May 1996 ====
1996
Party	Candidate	Votes	%	±%
Labour	Kenneth Barnes*	1,573	63.5	−13.0
Labour	Harold Lyons	1,317		
Conservative	Henry Coombes	322	13.0	+1.0
Liberal Democrats	Peter Matthews	267	10.8	+1.2
Independent	Carol Connell	231	9.3	+9.3
Liberal Democrats	Graham Shaw	124		
Green	R. Maile	84	3.4	+3.4
Majority		995	50.5	−14.0
Turnout		2,477		
Labour hold		Swing		
Labour hold		Swing	-7.0	

==== May 1998 ====
1998
Party	Candidate	Votes	%	±%
Labour	Harold Lyons*	1,043	68.4	+4.9
Conservative	Jacqueline Rowland	244	16.0	+3.0
Liberal Democrats	Peter Matthews	237	15.6	+4.8
Majority		799	52.4	+1.9
Turnout		1,524		
Labour hold		Swing	+0.9	

==== May 1999 ====
1999
Party	Candidate	Votes	%	±%
Labour	Anna Trotman	960	59.9	−8.5
Liberal Democrats	Carol Connell	452	28.2	+12.6
Conservative	Dorothy Keller	192	12.0	−4.0
Majority		508	31.7	−20.7
Turnout		1,604	19.0	
Labour hold		Swing	-10.5	

=== Elections in 2000s ===
==== May 2000 ====
2000
Party	Candidate	Votes	%	±%
Labour	Kenneth Barnes*	934	56.3	−3.6
Liberal Democrats	Carol Connell	445	26.8	−1.4
Conservative	Dorothy Keller	238	14.4	+2.4
Green	Michael Shaw	41	2.5	+2.5
Majority		489	29.5	−2.2
Turnout		1,658	20.7	+1.7
Labour hold		Swing	-1.1	

==== May 2002 ====
2002
Party	Candidate	Votes	%	±%
Labour	Harold Lyons*	1,462	72.0	+15.7
Liberal Democrats	Carol Connell	304	15.0	−11.8
Conservative	Daniel Bunting	199	9.8	−4.6
Green	Adam Higgin	66	3.2	+0.7
Majority		1,158	57.0	+27.5
Turnout		2,031	24.7	+4.0
Labour hold		Swing	+13.7	

==== May 2003 ====
2003
Party	Candidate	Votes	%	±%
Labour	Anna Trotman*	1,163	68.7	−3.3
Liberal Democrats	Carol Connell	248	14.6	−0.4
Conservative	Gerard Hopkins	207	12.2	+2.4
Green	Robin Goater	75	4.4	+1.2
Majority		915	54.0	−3.0
Turnout		1,693	21.1	−3.6
Labour hold		Swing	-1.4	

== See also ==
- Manchester City Council
- Manchester City Council elections
