= Abraham Moss =

Lord Mayor of Manchester 1953–1954

Abraham Moss (1898 or 1899- 20 June 1964) was the Lord Mayor of Manchester from 1953 to 1954. He was born in Manchester to Romanian Jewish parents, his father was Hasid and a Talmudic scholar. He was educated at Salford Grammar School. He married Doris Lewis in 1935. He was first elected to Manchester City Council in 1929. He worked in the textile trade but he focussed heavily on education and an elected councillor.

He was made a Justice of the peace in 1943 and an Alderman in 1946. In 1949 he liaised with Jewish organisation in the United States. He was made Master of Arts Honoris causa by University of Manchester in 1952. He died of a heart attack just days after being elected President of the Board of Deputies of British Jews, having been vice president for the proceeding 8 years.

Abraham Moss tram stop, Abraham Moss Community School and a combined leisure centre and library are named in his honour.

Honorary titles
Preceded by Douglas Gosling	Lord Mayor of Manchester; 1953–1954	Succeeded by Sir Richard Harper
