= Manchester City Council elections =

Local elections

Seats held by party after each election to Manchester City Council, 1973–2026

Manchester City Council elections are generally held three years out of every four, with a third of the council being elected each time. Manchester City Council (known as Manchester Corporation until 1974) is the local authority for the metropolitan borough of Manchester in Greater Manchester, England. Since the last boundary changes in 2018, 96 councillors have been elected from 32 wards.

== Council elections ==
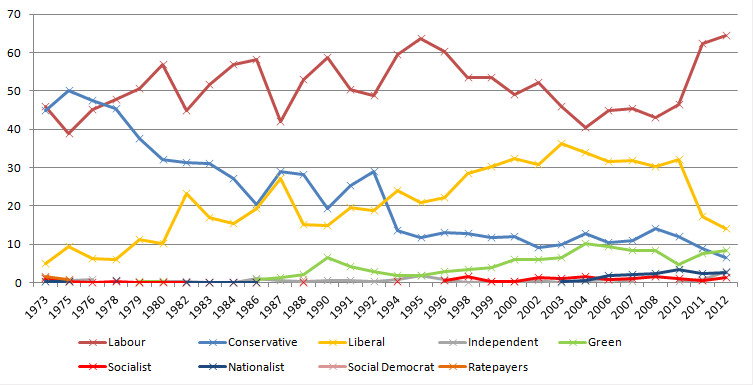
Popular vote share, 1973–2012

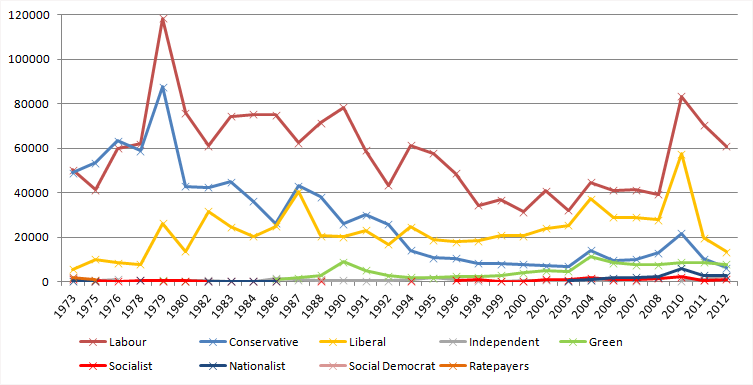
Popular vote figures, 1973–2012

Summary of the council composition after council elections, click on the year for full details of each election. Boundary changes took place for the 2004 election which reduced the number of seats by 3, leading to the whole council being elected in that year.

County Borough

Year	Labour	Conservative	Liberals	Independent
1909	11	71	44	14
1910				
1911				
1912	17	73	43	6
1913	16	71	45	7
1914				
1919	36	60	42	2
1920	31	67	40	2
1921	30	72	33	5
1922	26	76	33	5
1923	28	78	32	2
1924	32	72	31	5
1925	34	74	28	4
1926	41	68	27	4
1927	45	66	25	3
1928	47	61	28	4
1929	51	54	30	5
1930	51	59	27	3
1931	43	70	28	2
1932	38	74	28	3
1933	40	74	27	3
1934	47	63	30	4
1935	52	62	27	3
1936	52	62	25	3
1937	52	64	22	6
1938	52	67	19	6
1945	69	58	15	1
1946	79	55	10	0
1947	71	54	9	0
1949	64	72	8	0
1950	62	76	6	0
1951	61	77	6	0
1952	70	68	6	0
1953	74	66	4	0
1954	86	60	4	0
1955	85	63	4	0
1956	87	62	3	0
1957	89	60	3	0
1958	95	54	3	0
1959	92	57	3	0
1960	84	65	3	0
1961	79	69	4	0
1962	80	64	8	0
1963	89	54	9	0
1964	96	48	8	0
1965	90	58	4	0
1966	87	61	3	0
1967	73	78	1	0
1968	61	91	0	0
1969	53	99	0	0
1970	66	86	0	0
1971	107	25	0	0
1972	101	31	0	0

Metropolitan Borough

Year	Labour	Conservative	Liberals/Liberal Democrats	Greens	Independent	Workers	Reform UK
1973	59	40	0	0	0	0	0
1975	54	45	0	0	0	0	0
1976	54	45	0	0	0	0	0
1978	53	46	0	0	0	0	0
1979	63	33	3	0	0	0	0
1980	72	23	4	0	0	0	0
1982	69	26	4	0	0	0	0
1983	72	22	5	0	0	0	0
1984	79	14	6	0	0	0	0
1986	86	7	6	0	0	0	0
1987	77	13	9	0	0	0	0
1988	78	12	9	0	0	0	0
1990	78	12	9	0	0	0	0
1991	85	5	9	0	0	0	0
1992	80	5	12	0	2	0	0
1994	79	4	15	0	1	0	0
1995	83	2	14	0	0	0	0
1996	84	0	15	0	0	0	0
1998	84	0	15	0	0	0	0
1999	80	0	19	0	0	0	0
2000	78	0	21	0	0	0	0
2002	76	0	22	0	1	0	0
2003	71	0	27	1	0	0	0
2004	57	0	38	1	0	0	0
2006	61	0	34	1	0	0	0
2007	60	0	35	1	0	0	0
2008	61	1	34	0	0	0	0
2010	62	1	33	0	0	0	0
2011	75	0	20	0	1	0	0
2012	86	0	9	0	1	0	0
2014	95	0	0	0	1	0	0
2015	96	0	0	0	0	0	0
2016	95	0	1	0	0	0	0
2018	94	0	2	0	0	0	0
2019	93	0	3	0	0	0	0
2021	94	0	1	1	0	0	0
2022	92	0	2	2	0	0	0
2023	88	0	4	4	0	0	0
2024	87	0	4	3	1	1	0
2026	63	0	4	21	0	1	7

== Borough result maps ==
2004 results map

2006 results map

2007 results map

2008 results map

2010 results map

2011 results map

2012 results map

2014 results map

2015 results map

2016 results map

2018 results map

2019 results map

2021 results map

2022 results map

2023 results map

2024 results map

2026 results map

== By-election results ==
By-election	Date	Incumbent party	Winning party
Beswick by-election	27 June 1974	Labour	Labour
Blackley by-election	27 June 1974	Labour	Labour
Blackley by-election	27 June 1974	Labour	Labour
Harpurhey by-election	25 July 1974	Labour	Labour
Withington by-election	16 November 1978	Conservative	Liberal
Gorton South by-election	25 September 1980	Labour	Labour
Blackley by-election	2 April 1981	Conservative	Labour
Old Moat by-election	9 July 1981	Conservative	Conservative
Moston by-election	27 July 1995	Labour	Labour
Hulme by-election	2 May 1997	Labour	Labour
Old Moat by-election	2 May 1997	Labour	Labour
Cheetham by-election	24 September 1998	Labour	Liberal Democrats
Benchill by-election	10 June 1999	Labour	Labour
Central by-election	26 August 1999	Labour	Labour
Baguley by-election	25 January 2001	Labour	Labour
Beswick and Clayton by-election	10 June 2001	Labour	Labour
Sharston by-election	10 June 2001	Labour	Labour
Whalley Range by-election	10 June 2001	Labour	Labour
Benchill by-election	13 June 2002	Labour	Labour
Gorton South by-election	19 October 2006	Liberal Democrats	Liberal Democrats
Charlestown by-election	14 June 2007	Labour	Labour
Didsbury West by-election	29 January 2009	Liberal Democrats	Liberal Democrats
Moston by-election	29 January 2009	Labour	Labour
Hulme by-election	4 November 2010	Labour	Labour
Baguley by-election	20 January 2011	Labour	Labour
Ardwick by-election	15 November 2012	Labour	Labour
Ancoats and Clayton by-election	10 October 2013	Labour	Labour
Ancoats and Clayton by-election	5 December 2013	Labour	Labour
Higher Blackley by-election	18 February 2016	Labour	Labour
Rusholme by-election	4 May 2017	Labour	Labour
Fallowfield by-election	27 July 2017	Labour	Labour
Clayton & Openshaw by-election	27 February 2020	Labour	Independent
Chorlton by-election	18 November 2021	Labour	Labour
Ancoats & Beswick by-election	3 February 2022	Labour	Liberal Democrats
Brooklands by-election	26 July 2023	Labour	Labour
Baguley by-election	5 September 2024	Labour	Labour
Woodhouse Park by-election	25 September 2025	Green	Green
Burnage by-election	10 September 2026	Labour	Labour

== See also ==
- Category:Councillors in Manchester – list of councillors serving on Manchester City Council
- Politics in Manchester
