= Alexandra Park (Manchester ward) =

- Ward
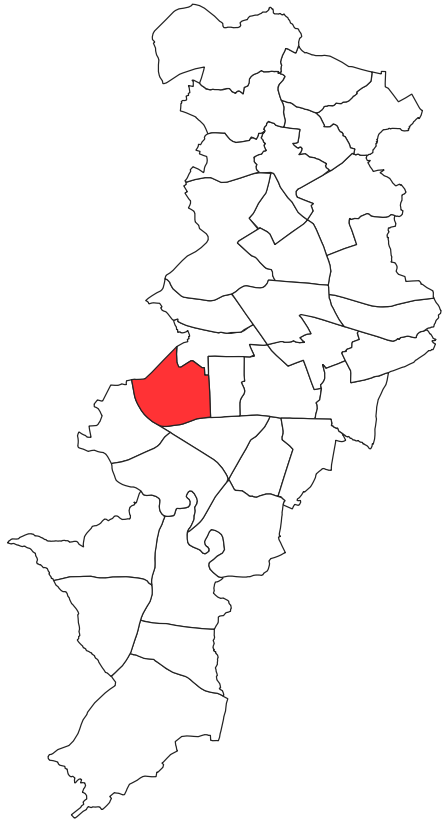
- Alexandra ward (1973) within Manchester

- Coat of arms
- Interactive map of Alexandra Park
- Country: United Kingdom
- Constituent country: England
- Region: North West England
- County: Greater Manchester
- Metropolitan borough: Manchester
- Created: May 1950
- Named for: Alexandra Park

Government
  - Type: Unicameral
  - Body: Manchester City Council
- UK Parliamentary Constituency: Manchester Moss Side

Alexandra Park, later Alexandra, was an electoral division of Manchester City Council which was represented from 1950 until 1982. It covered the suburb of Whalley Range, as well as parts of Fallowfield and Moss Side.

== Overview ==
Alexandra Park ward was created in 1950, covering the eastern portion of the Chorlton-cum-Hardy ward, which included Whalley Range and parts of Fallowfield. In 1971, its name was shortened to Alexandra and that part of the ward to the east of Princess Road was transferred to the new Lloyd Street ward. In 1982, the ward was abolished, and its remaining area became the new Whalley Range ward.

For the entirety of its existence, the ward formed part of the Manchester Moss Side Parliamentary constituency.

== Councillors ==
Election	Councillor	Councillor	Councillor
1950	A. Lees (Con)	J. E. Fitzsimons (Con)	L. Bailey (Con)
February 1951	A. Lees (Con)	H. Ward (Con)	L. Bailey (Con)
1951	A. Lees (Con)	H. Ward (Con)	L. Bailey (Con)
1952	T. E. Bird (Con)	H. Ward (Con)	L. Bailey (Con)
1953	T. E. Bird (Con)	H. Ward (Con)	L. Bailey (Con)
1954	T. E. Bird (Con)	H. Ward (Con)	L. Bailey (Con)
1955	T. E. Bird (Con)	H. Ward (Con)	L. Bailey (Con)
1956	T. E. Bird (Con)	H. Ward (Con)	L. Bailey (Con)
1957	N. Thompson (Con)	H. Ward (Con)	L. Bailey (Con)
1958	N. Thompson (Con)	H. Ward (Con)	L. Bailey (Con)
1959	N. Thompson (Con)	H. Ward (Con)	L. Bailey (Con)
1960	N. Thompson (Con)	H. Ward (Con)	L. Bailey (Con)
1961	N. Thompson (Con)	H. Ward (Con)	L. Bailey (Con)
1962	N. Thompson (Con)	A. Alexander (Lib)	L. Bailey (Con)
1963	N. Thompson (Con)	A. Alexander (Lib)	L. Bailey (Con)
1964	N. Thompson (Con)	A. Alexander (Lib)	L. Bailey (Con)
1965	N. Thompson (Con)	K. C. Slater (Con)	L. Bailey (Con)
1966	N. Thompson (Con)	K. C. Slater (Con)	L. Bailey (Con)
1967	N. Thompson (Con)	K. C. Slater (Con)	L. Bailey (Con)
1968	N. Thompson (Con)	J. B. Chapman (Con)	M. Flynn (Con)
1969	N. Thompson (Con)	J. B. Chapman (Con)	M. Flynn (Con)
1970	N. Thompson (Con)	J. B. Chapman (Con)	M. Flynn (Con)
1971	M. Flynn (Con)	N. Thompson (Con)	J. B. Chapman (Con)
1972	M. Flynn (Con)	N. Thompson (Con)	J. B. Chapman (Con)
1973	M. Flynn (Con)	N. Thompson (Con)	R. C. Rodgers (Con)
1975	M. Flynn (Con)	N. Thompson (Con)	R. C. Rodgers (Con)
1976	M. Flynn (Con)	N. Thompson (Con)	R. C. Rodgers (Con)
1978	M. Flynn (Con)	N. Thompson (Con)	R. C. Rodgers (Con)
1979	M. Flynn (Con)	N. Thompson (Con)	R. C. Rodgers (Con)
1980	M. Flynn (Con)	T. E. Murphy (Con)	R. C. Rodgers (Con)

== Elections ==
=== Elections in 1950s ===
==== May 1950 ====
1950
Party	Candidate	Votes	%	±%
Conservative	J. E. Fitzsimons*	5,108	75.8	
Labour	C. Lynch	1,627	24.2	
Majority		3,481	51.6	
Turnout		6,735		
Conservative hold		Swing		

==== February 1951 (by-election) ====
By-election: 1 February 1951
Party	Candidate	Votes	%	±%
Conservative	H. Ward	3,547	81.7	+5.9
Labour	J. Dutton	792	18.3	−5.9
Majority		2,755	63.4	+11.8
Turnout		4,339		
Conservative hold		Swing		

==== May 1951 ====
1951
Party	Candidate	Votes	%	±%
Conservative	A. Lees*	4,530	79.6	+3.8
Labour	J. H. Paris	1,159	20.4	−3.8
Majority		3,371	59.2	+7.6
Turnout		5,689		
Conservative hold		Swing		

==== May 1952 ====
1952 (2 vacancies)
Party	Candidate	Votes	%	±%
Conservative	L. Bailey*	4,746	71.6	−8.0
Conservative	T. E. Bird*	4,731	71.3	−8.3
Labour	K. Pollitt	1,907	28.8	+8.4
Labour	L. Drury	1,877	28.3	+7.9
Majority		2,824	42.5	−16.7
Turnout		6,631		
Conservative hold		Swing		
Conservative hold		Swing		

==== May 1953 ====
1953
Party	Candidate	Votes	%	±%
Conservative	H. Ward*	4,434	75.9	+4.3
Labour	I. Atkinson	1,406	24.1	−4.7
Majority		3,028	51.8	+9.3
Turnout		5,840		
Conservative hold		Swing		

==== May 1954 ====
1954
Party	Candidate	Votes	%	±%
Conservative	T. E. Bird*	4,113	74.1	−1.8
Labour	H. Jenkins	1,439	25.9	+1.8
Majority		2,674	48.2	−3.6
Turnout		5,552		
Conservative hold		Swing		

==== May 1955 ====
1955
Party	Candidate	Votes	%	±%
Conservative	L. Bailey*	4,306	81.1	+7.0
Labour	C. E. Bedgood	1,003	18.9	−7.0
Majority		3,303	62.2	+14.0
Turnout		5,309		
Conservative hold		Swing		

==== May 1956 ====
1956
Party	Candidate	Votes	%	±%
Conservative	H. Ward*	2,838	60.0	−21.1
Liberal	G. E. Sharpe	1,071	22.6	N/A
Labour	H. W. Bliss	821	17.4	−1.5
Majority		1,767	37.4	−24.8
Turnout		4,730		
Conservative hold		Swing		

==== May 1957 ====
1957
Party	Candidate	Votes	%	±%
Conservative	N. Thompson	3,107	53.9	−6.1
Liberal	G. E. Sharpe	1,487	25.8	+3.2
Labour	A. A. Dandy	1,166	20.3	+2.9
Majority		1,620	28.1	−9.3
Turnout		5,760		
Conservative hold		Swing		

==== May 1958 ====
1958
Party	Candidate	Votes	%	±%
Conservative	L. Bailey*	2,839	51.6	−2.3
Liberal	G. E. Sharpe	1,791	32.6	+6.8
Labour	A. A. Dandy	869	15.8	−4.5
Majority		1,048	19.0	−9.1
Turnout		5,499		
Conservative hold		Swing		

==== May 1959 ====
1959
Party	Candidate	Votes	%	±%
Conservative	H. Ward*	3,413	61.6	+10.0
Liberal	L. Thornton Smith	1,314	23.7	−8.9
Labour	H. Conway	817	14.7	−1.1
Majority		2,099	37.9	+18.9
Turnout		5,544		
Conservative hold		Swing		

=== Elections in 1960s ===
==== May 1960 ====
1960
Party	Candidate	Votes	%	±%
Conservative	N. Thompson*	3,220	62.6	+1.0
Liberal	A. Alexander	1,419	27.6	+3.9
Labour	E. McKeon	504	9.8	−4.9
Majority		1,801	35.0	−2.9
Turnout		5,143		
Conservative hold		Swing		

==== May 1961 ====
1961
Party	Candidate	Votes	%	±%
Conservative	L. Bailey*	2,841	54.2	−8.4
Liberal	A. Alexander	1,834	35.0	+7.4
Labour	G. Hayward	570	10.8	+1.0
Majority		1,007	19.2	−15.8
Turnout		5,245		
Conservative hold		Swing		

==== May 1962 ====
1962
Party	Candidate	Votes	%	±%
Liberal	A. Alexander	2,538	44.1	+9.1
Conservative	H. Ward*	2,454	42.7	−11.5
Labour	G. Hayward	468	8.1	−2.7
Ratepayers	B. Shields	153	2.7	N/A
Union Movement	N. Kennedy	138	2.4	N/A
Majority		84	1.4	
Turnout		5,751		
Liberal gain from Conservative		Swing		

==== May 1963 ====
1963
Party	Candidate	Votes	%	±%
Conservative	N. Thompson*	3,094	50.6	+7.9
Liberal	A. Whiteland	2,122	34.7	−9.4
Labour	T. Richardson	817	13.4	+5.3
Union Movement	R. J. Marsden	83	1.4	−1.0
Majority		972	15.9	
Turnout		6,116		
Conservative hold		Swing		

==== May 1964 ====
1964
Party	Candidate	Votes	%	±%
Conservative	L. Bailey*	2,937	51.2	+0.6
Liberal	A. Whiteland	1,681	29.3	−5.4
Labour	A. Flanaghan	1,020	17.8	+4.4
Union Movement	R. J. Marsden	96	1.7	+0.3
Majority		1,256	21.9	+6.0
Turnout		5,734		
Conservative hold		Swing		

==== May 1965 ====
1965
Party	Candidate	Votes	%	±%
Conservative	K. C. Slater	3,242	58.3	+7.1
Liberal	S. Rose	1,520	27.3	−2.0
Labour	A. Flanaghan	797	14.4	−3.4
Majority		1,722	31.0	+9.1
Turnout		5,559		
Conservative gain from Liberal		Swing		

==== May 1966 ====
1966
Party	Candidate	Votes	%	±%
Conservative	N. Thompson*	3,040	61.7	+3.4
Liberal	E. O. Tomlinson	1,194	24.2	−3.1
Labour	G. Hayward	691	14.1	−0.3
Majority		1,846	37.5	+6.5
Turnout		4,925		
Conservative hold		Swing		

==== May 1967 ====
1967
Party	Candidate	Votes	%	±%
Conservative	L. Bailey*	2,937	66.5	+4.8
Liberal	E. O. Tomlinson	955	21.6	−2.6
Labour	K. McKeon	526	11.9	−2.2
Majority		1,982	44.9	+7.4
Turnout		4,418		
Conservative hold		Swing		

==== May 1968 ====
1968 (2 vacancies)
Party	Candidate	Votes	%	±%
Conservative	J. B. Chapman	3,475	69.3	+2.8
Conservative	M. Flynn	3,428	68.3	+1.8
Liberal	E. O. Tomlinson	1,147	22.9	+1.3
Liberal	F. Griffiths	1,104	22.0	+0.4
Labour	E. McKeon	394	7.9	−4.0
Majority		2,281	45.4	+0.5
Turnout		5,016		
Conservative hold		Swing		
Conservative hold		Swing		

==== May 1969 ====
1969
Party	Candidate	Votes	%	±%
Conservative	N. Thompson*	3,405	69.3	−1.5
Liberal	E. O. Tomlinson	1,125	22.9	−0.5
Labour	K. McKeon	489	9.7	+1.8
Majority		2,280	45.4	0
Turnout		5,019		
Conservative hold		Swing		

=== Elections in 1970s ===
==== May 1970 ====
1970
Party	Candidate	Votes	%	±%
Conservative	M. Flynn*	3,059	57.7	−11.6
Liberal	E. O. Tomlinson	1,255	23.7	+0.8
Labour	K. McKeon	954	18.0	+8.3
Residents	G. Edwards	38	0.6	N/A
Majority		1,804	34.0	−11.4
Turnout		5,306		
Conservative hold		Swing		

==== May 1971 ====
1971 (3 vacancies; new boundaries)
Party	Candidate	Votes	%	±%
Conservative	M. Flynn*	2,979	62.5	
Conservative	N. Thompson*	2,973	62.4	
Conservative	J. B. Chapman*	2,857	59.9	
Labour	K. McKeon	1,264	26.5	
Labour	S. M. Miller	1,235	25.9	
Labour	G. M. Morton	1,210	25.4	
Liberal	L. J. Howard	545	11.4	
Liberal	W. S. Kenyon	531	11.1	
Liberal	S. Lowe	504	10.6	
Communist	A. Fleetwood	201	4.2	
Majority		1,593	33.4	
Turnout		4,766		
Conservative win (new seat)				
Conservative win (new seat)				
Conservative win (new seat)				

==== May 1972 ====
1972
Party	Candidate	Votes	%	±%
Conservative	J. B. Chapman*	3,120	71.3	+8.8
Labour	A. S. Wood	1,258	28.7	+2.2
Majority		1,862	42.6	+9.2
Turnout		4,378		
Conservative hold		Swing		

==== May 1973 ====
1973 (3 vacancies; reorganisation)
Party	Candidate	Votes	%	±%
Conservative	M. Flynn*	2,298	50.8	−20.5
Conservative	N. Thompson*	2,236	49.4	−21.9
Conservative	R. C. Rodgers*	2,163	47.8	−23.5
Liberal	D. Hewitt	1,625	35.9	N/A
Liberal	P. Davis	1,532	33.8	N/A
Liberal	C. G. Sinclair	1,444	31.9	N/A
Labour	J. M. Bradley	568	12.5	−16.2
Labour	J. H. Parish	529	11.7	−17.0
Labour	P. J. Salts	513	11.3	−17.4
Majority		538	11.9	−30.7
Turnout		4,528		
Conservative hold		Swing		
Conservative hold		Swing		
Conservative hold		Swing		

==== May 1975 ====
1975
Party	Candidate	Votes	%	±%
Conservative	R. Rodgers*	2,929	61.5	+10.3
Liberal	K. Summerfield	1,005	21.1	−15.1
Labour	J. Comyn-Platt	832	17.5	+4.8
Majority		341	40.4	+25.4
Turnout		4,766		
Conservative hold		Swing		

==== May 1976 ====
1976
Party	Candidate	Votes	%	±%
Conservative	N. Thompson*	3,230	61.3	−0.2
Liberal	D. Hewitt	1,012	19.2	−1.9
Labour	A. G. Mackie	963	18.3	+0.8
Independent	S. Martyniuk	61	1.2	+1.2
Majority		2,218	42.1	+1.7
Turnout		5,266		
Conservative hold		Swing		

==== May 1978 ====
1978
Party	Candidate	Votes	%	±%
Conservative	M. Flynn*	2,895	59.9	−1.4
Labour	G. M. Gorton	1,249	25.8	+7.5
Liberal	D. Hewitt	689	14.3	−4.9
Majority		1,646	34.1	−8.0
Turnout		4,833	37.6	
Conservative hold		Swing		

==== May 1979 ====
1979
Party	Candidate	Votes	%	±%
Conservative	R. C. Rodgers*	4,864	58.8	−1.1
Labour	J. Cocker	3,403	41.2	+15.4
Majority		1,461	17.7	−16.4
Turnout		8,267	72.3	+34.7
Conservative hold		Swing		

=== Elections in 1980s ===
==== May 1980 ====
1980
Party	Candidate	Votes	%	±%
Conservative	T. E. Murphy	2,502	48.2	−10.6
Labour	R. B. Walters	1,823	35.1	−6.1
Liberal	M. A. Plesch	862	16.6	N/A
Majority		679	13.1	−4.6
Turnout		5,187	43.0	−29.3
Conservative hold		Swing		

== See also ==
- Manchester City Council
- Manchester City Council elections
