= Crossacres (ward) =

- Ward
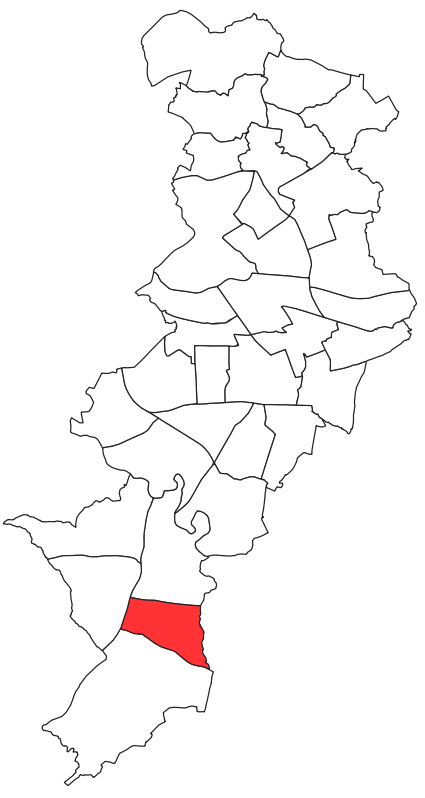
- Crossacres (1973) within Manchester

- Coat of arms
- Country: United Kingdom
- Constituent country: England
- Region: North West England
- County: Greater Manchester
- Metropolitan borough: Manchester
- Created: May 1971
- Named for: Crossacres Road, Wythenshawe

Government
  - Type: Unicameral
  - Body: Manchester City Council
- UK Parliamentary Constituency: Manchester Wythenshawe

Crossacres was an electoral division of Manchester City Council which was represented from 1971 until 1982. It covered part of Wythenshawe, including the Civic Centre.

== Overview ==
Crossacres ward was created in 1971, covering the northern portion of the Woodhouse Park ward and the southern portion of the former Benchill ward. In 1982, the ward was abolished, and its area was divided between the new Benchill and Sharston wards.

For the entirety of its existence, the ward formed part of the Manchester Wythenshawe Parliamentary constituency.

== Councillors ==
Election	Councillor	Councillor	Councillor
1971	N. Morris (Lab)	R. L. Griffiths (Lab)	A. Roberts (Lab)
July 1971	H. Reid (Lab)	R. L. Griffiths (Lab)	A. Roberts (Lab)
1972	H. Reid (Lab)	R. L. Griffiths (Lab)	A. Roberts (Lab)
1973	R. L. Griffiths (Lab)	A. Roberts (Lab)	K. Collis (Lab)
1975	R. L. Griffiths (Lab)	A. Roberts (Lab)	K. Collis (Lab)
1976	R. L. Griffiths (Lab)	A. Roberts (Lab)	K. Collis (Lab)
1978	R. L. Griffiths (Lab)	A. Roberts (Lab)	K. Collis (Lab)
1978	R. L. Griffiths (Lab)	A. Roberts (Lab)	K. Collis (Lab)
1979	R. L. Griffiths (Lab)	A. Roberts (Lab)	K. Collis (Lab)
1979	R. L. Griffiths (Lab)	K. Lim (Lab)	K. Collis (Lab)

== Elections ==
=== Elections in 1970s ===
==== May 1971 ====
1971 (3 vacancies)
Party	Candidate	Votes	%	±%
Labour	N. Morris*	4,842	79.3	
Labour	R. L. Griffiths*	4,587	75.1	
Labour	A. Roberts	4,341	71.1	
Conservative	J. Jones	1,744	28.6	
Conservative	D. O'Sullivan	1,285	21.0	
Conservative	D. R. Westhead	1,251	20.5	
Communist	M. E. Taylor	265	4.3	
Majority		2,597	42.5	
Turnout		6,105		
Labour win (new seat)				
Labour win (new seat)				
Labour win (new seat)				

==== July 1971 (by-election) ====
By-election: 8 July 1971
Party	Candidate	Votes	%	±%
Labour	H. Reid	1,887	77.2	−2.1
Conservative	D. R. Westhead	558	22.8	−5.8
Majority		1,329	54.4	+11.9
Turnout		2,445		
Labour hold		Swing		

==== May 1972 ====
1972
Party	Candidate	Votes	%	±%
Labour	A. Roberts*	3,200	68.4	−8.9
Conservative	J. Jones	1,353	28.9	+0.3
Communist	M. E. Taylor	126	2.7	−1.6
Majority		1,847	39.5	−3.0
Turnout		4,679		
Labour hold		Swing		

==== May 1973 ====
1973 (3 vacancies; reorganisation)
Party	Candidate	Votes	%	±%
Labour	R. L. Griffiths*	2,461	54.6	−13.8
Labour	A. Roberts	2,353	52.2	−16.2
Labour	K. Collis*	2,269	50.4	−18.0
Residents	R. R. Dilworth	1,271	28.2	N/A
Residents	K. A. Edis	1,267	28.1	N/A
Residents	W. A. McCall	1,251	27.8	N/A
Conservative	W. Foster	756	16.8	−12.1
Conservative	K. Nolan	745	16.5	−12.4
Conservative	G. Scudder	684	15.2	−13.7
Communist	M. Taylor	145	3.2	+0.5
Majority		998	22.2	−17.3
Turnout		4,504		
Labour hold		Swing		
Labour hold		Swing		
Labour hold		Swing		

==== May 1975 ====
1975
Party	Candidate	Votes	%	±%
Labour	K. Collis*	2,017	46.5	−6.6
Conservative	R. W. Munn	934	21.5	+5.2
Residents	K. A. Edis	717	16.5	−13.9
Liberal	H. Griffiths	605	13.9	+13.9
Communist	M. Taylor	64	1.5	−1.6
Majority		1,083	25.0	−0.7
Turnout		4,337		
Labour hold		Swing	-5.9	

==== May 1976 ====
1976
Party	Candidate	Votes	%	±%
Labour	A. Roberts*	3,257	59.6	+13.1
Conservative	K. A. Edis	1,576	28.8	+7.3
Liberal	H. Griffiths	633	11.6	−2.3
Majority		1,681	30.8	+5.8
Turnout		5,466		
Labour hold		Swing	+2.9	

==== May 1978 ====
1978
Party	Candidate	Votes	%	±%
Labour	R. L. Griffiths*	2,877	59.5	−0.1
Conservative	A. Spencer	1,418	29.3	+0.5
Liberal	H. Griffiths	537	11.1	−0.5
Majority		1,459	30.2	−0.6
Turnout		4,832	35.3	
Labour hold		Swing	-0.3	

==== May 1979 ====
1979
Party	Candidate	Votes	%	±%
Labour	K. Collis*	5,577	60.1	+0.6
Conservative	A. Spencer	2,348	25.3	−4.0
Liberal	H. Griffiths	1,358	14.6	+3.5
Majority		3,229	34.8	+4.6
Turnout		9,283	70.5	+35.2
Labour hold		Swing	+2.3	

=== Elections in 1980s ===
==== May 1980 ====
1980
Party	Candidate	Votes	%	±%
Labour	K. Lim	3,463	70.4	+10.3
Conservative	A. Spencer	956	19.4	−5.9
Liberal	J. Southward	500	10.2	−4.4
Majority		2,507	51.0	+16.2
Turnout		4,919	36.9	−33.6
Labour hold		Swing	+8.1	

== See also ==
- Manchester City Council
- Manchester City Council elections
