= Lloyd Street =

- Ward
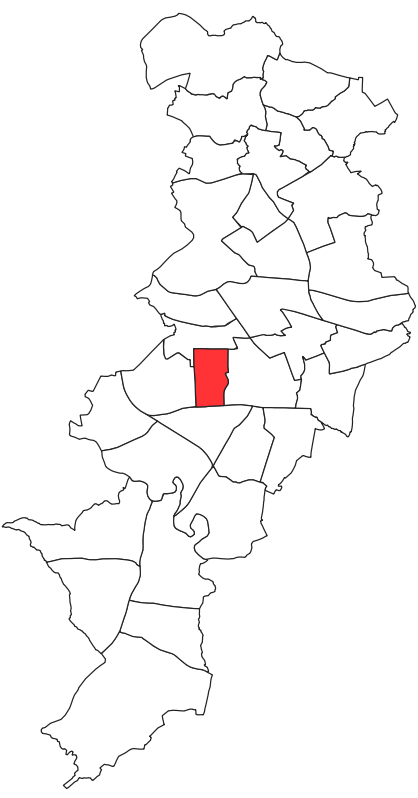
- Lloyd Street ward (1973) within Manchester

- Coat of arms
- Country: United Kingdom
- Constituent country: England
- Region: North West England
- County: Greater Manchester
- Metropolitan borough: Manchester
- Created: May 1971
- Named for: Lloyd Street, Manchester

Government
  - Type: Unicameral
  - Body: Manchester City Council
- UK Parliamentary Constituency: Manchester Moss Side

Lloyd Street was an electoral division of Manchester City Council which was represented from 1971 until 1982. It covered parts of Fallowfield and Moss Side.

== Overview ==
Lloyd Street ward was created in 1971, covering the eastern portion of the Alexandra Park ward and the southern portion of the former Moss Side East ward. In 1982, the ward was abolished, and its area was divided between the Moss Side ward and the new Fallowfield ward.

For the entirety of its existence, the ward formed part of the Manchester Moss Side Parliamentary constituency.

== Councillors ==
| Election | Councillor | Councillor | Councillor |
|---|---|---|---|
| 1971 | J. Taylor (Lab) | J. Davis (Lab) | W. Massey (Lab) |
| July 1971 | J. Taylor (Lab) | J. Davis (Lab) | K. McKeon (Lab) |
| 1972 | J. Taylor (Lab) | J. Davis (Lab) | K. McKeon (Lab) |
| 1973 | H. Collins (Lab) | K. McKeon (Lab) | A. S. Wood (Lab) |
| 1975 | H. Collins (Lab) | K. McKeon (Lab) | A. S. Wood (Lab) |
| 1976 | H. Collins (Lab) | K. McKeon (Lab) | A. S. Wood (Lab) |
| 1978 | H. Collins (Lab) | K. McKeon (Lab) | A. S. Wood (Lab) |
| 1979 | H. Collins (Lab) | K. McKeon (Lab) | A. S. Wood (Lab) |
| 1980 | H. Collins (Lab) | K. McKeon (Lab) | A. S. Wood (Lab) |
| November 1981 | H. Collins (Lab) | K. McKeon (SDP) | A. S. Wood (Lab) |

== Elections ==
=== Elections in 1970s ===
==== May 1971 ====
1971 (3 vacancies)
| Party | Candidate | Votes | % | ±% |
|---|---|---|---|---|
| Labour | J. Taylor | 3,503 | 63.0 | |
| Labour | J. Davis* | 3,351 | 60.3 | |
| Labour | W. Massey* | 3,240 | 58.3 | |
| Conservative | J. Pollitt* | 2,186 | 39.3 | |
| Conservative | P. M. Nixon* | 2,185 | 39.3 | |
| Conservative | A. H. Burlin* | 1,928 | 34.7 | |
| Communist | W. Hamilton | 290 | 5.2 | |
| Majority | | 1,054 | 19.0 | |
| Turnout | | 5,561 | | |
| Labour win (new seat) | | | | |
| Labour win (new seat) | | | | |
| Labour win (new seat) | | | | |

==== July 1971 (by-election) ====
By-election: 8 July 1971
| Party | Candidate | Votes | % | ±% |
|---|---|---|---|---|
| Labour | K. McKeon | 1,947 | 56.9 | −6.1 |
| Conservative | W. R. Swan | 1,472 | 43.1 | +3.8 |
| Majority | | 475 | 13.8 | −5.2 |
| Turnout | | 3,419 | | |
| Labour hold | | Swing | | |

==== May 1972 ====
1972
| Party | Candidate | Votes | % | ±% |
|---|---|---|---|---|
| Labour | K. McKeon* | 2,423 | 54.6 | −8.4 |
| Conservative | S. D. Alexander | 2,011 | 45.4 | +6.1 |
| Majority | | 412 | 9.2 | −9.8 |
| Turnout | | 4,434 | | |
| Labour hold | | Swing | | |

==== May 1973 ====
1973 (3 vacancies; reorganisation)
| Party | Candidate | Votes | % | ±% |
|---|---|---|---|---|
| Labour | H. Collins | 2,128 | 55.2 | +0.6 |
| Labour | K. McKeon* | 2,084 | 54.0 | −0.6 |
| Labour | A. S. Wood | 1,982 | 51.4 | −3.2 |
| Conservative | J. E. Higham | 1,642 | 42.5 | −1.0 |
| Conservative | E. Bevan | 1,604 | 41.6 | −3.8 |
| Conservative | L. H. Nield | 1,553 | 40.3 | −5.1 |
| Majority | | 340 | 8.8 | −0.4 |
| Turnout | | 3,856 | | |
| Labour hold | | Swing | | |
| Labour hold | | Swing | | |
| Labour hold | | Swing | | |

==== May 1975 ====
1975
| Party | Candidate | Votes | % | ±% |
|---|---|---|---|---|
| Labour | A. S. Wood* | 1,683 | 46.0 | −10.4 |
| Conservative | D. Sumberg | 1,553 | 42.5 | −1.0 |
| Liberal | R. Cowe | 419 | 11.5 | N/A |
| Majority | | 130 | 3.6 | −9.3 |
| Turnout | | 3,655 | | |
| Labour hold | | Swing | -4.7 | |

==== May 1976 ====
1976
| Party | Candidate | Votes | % | ±% |
|---|---|---|---|---|
| Labour | K. McKeon* | 2,402 | 50.6 | +4.6 |
| Conservative | A. Nixon | 2,088 | 44.0 | +1.5 |
| Liberal | R. Coleman | 204 | 4.3 | −7.2 |
| Independent | D. E. Carter | 50 | 1.1 | N/A |
| Majority | | 314 | 6.6 | +3.0 |
| Turnout | | 4,744 | | |
| Labour hold | | Swing | +1.5 | |

==== May 1978 ====
1978
| Party | Candidate | Votes | % | ±% |
|---|---|---|---|---|
| Labour | H. Collins* | 2,364 | 53.2 | +2.6 |
| Conservative | A. D. Neville | 1,867 | 42.0 | −2.0 |
| Liberal | P. Davis | 212 | 4.8 | +0.5 |
| Majority | | 497 | 11.2 | +4.6 |
| Turnout | | 4,443 | 35.8 | |
| Labour hold | | Swing | +2.3 | |

==== May 1979 ====
1979
| Party | Candidate | Votes | % | ±% |
|---|---|---|---|---|
| Labour | A. S. Wood* | 4,449 | 56.0 | +2.8 |
| Conservative | M. L. Davies | 2,788 | 35.1 | −6.9 |
| Liberal | M. A. Plesch | 540 | 6.8 | +2.0 |
| Independent | A. H. Bradley | 164 | 2.1 | N/A |
| Majority | | 1,661 | 20.9 | +9.7 |
| Turnout | | 7,941 | 69.3 | +33.5 |
| Labour hold | | Swing | +4.8 | |

=== Elections in 1980s ===
==== May 1980 ====
1980
| Party | Candidate | Votes | % | ±% |
|---|---|---|---|---|
| Labour | K. McKeon* | 2,679 | 69.2 | +13.2 |
| Conservative | R. E. Bevan | 1,035 | 26.7 | −8.4 |
| Liberal | E. Thompson | 156 | 4.0 | −2.8 |
| Majority | | 1,644 | 42.5 | +21.6 |
| Turnout | | 3,870 | 33.0 | −36.3 |
| Labour hold | | Swing | +10.8 | |

== See also ==
- Manchester City Council
- Manchester City Council elections
