= 1980 Manchester City Council election =

1980 UK local government election

- 1 May 1980

35 of 99 seats to Manchester City Council 50 seats needed for a majority
	First party	Second party	Third party
Leader	Norman Morris	Cecil Franks	Audrey Jones
Party	Labour	Conservative	Liberal
Leader's seat	Charlestown	Chorlton	Withington
Last election	25 seats, 50.7%	6 seats, 37.6%	2 seats, 11.2%
Seats before	63	33	3
Seats won	30	4	1
Seats after	72	23	4
Seat change	▲9	▼10	▲1
Popular vote	75,837	42,744	13,624
Percentage	57.0%	32.1%	10.2%
Swing	▲6.3%	▼5.5%	▼1.0%
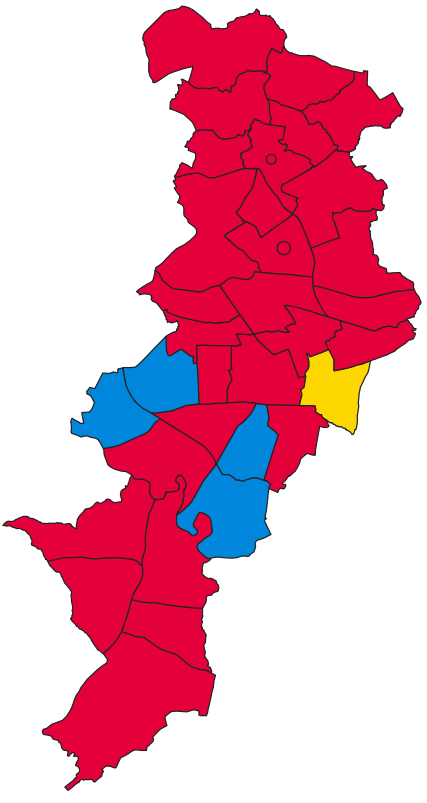
- Map of results of 1980 election
Leader of the Council before election
Norman Morris
Labour
Leader of the Council after election
Norman Morris
Labour

Elections to Manchester City Council were held on Thursday, 1 May 1980. One-third of the council was up for election, with each successful candidate to serve a two-year term of office, expiring in 1982, due to the boundary changes and "all-out" elections due to take place that year. The Labour Party retained overall control of the council.

== Election result ==
Party	Votes		Seats			Full Council	
Labour Party	75,837 (57.0%)	▲6.3	30 (85.7%)	30 / 35	▲9	72 (72.8%)	72 / 99
Conservative Party	42,744 (32.1%)	▼5.5	4 (11.4%)	4 / 35	▼12	23 (23.2%)	23 / 99
Liberal Party	13,624 (10.2%)	▼1.0	1 (2.9%)	1 / 35	▲1	4 (4.0%)	4 / 99
Independent	321 (0.2%)	▲0.1	0 (0.0%)	0 / 35	Steady	0 (0.0%)	0 / 99
Ecology	295 (0.2%)	▼0.1	0 (0.0%)	0 / 35	Steady	0 (0.0%)	0 / 99
Communist	145 (0.1%)	Steady	0 (0.0%)	0 / 35	Steady	0 (0.0%)	0 / 99
Socialist Workers	75 (0.1%)	N/A	0 (0.0%)	0 / 35	N/A	0 (0.0%)	0 / 99

↓
72	4	23

== Ward results ==
=== Alexandra ===
Alexandra
Party	Candidate	Votes	%	±%
Conservative	T. E. Murphy	2,502	48.2	−10.6
Labour	R. B. Walters	1,823	35.1	−6.1
Liberal	M. A. Plesch	862	16.6	N/A
Majority		679	13.1	−4.6
Turnout		5,187	43.0	−29.3
Conservative hold		Swing		

=== Ardwick ===
Ardwick
Party	Candidate	Votes	%	±%
Labour	F. Dale*	2,436	81.4	+22.9
Conservative	G. Taylor	441	14.7	−18.8
Liberal	J. Spittle	114	3.8	−4.2
Majority		1,995	66.7	+41.7
Turnout		2,991	29.2	−33.1
Labour hold		Swing	+20.8	

=== Baguley ===
Baguley
Party	Candidate	Votes	%	±%
Labour	A. Burns*	3,754	65.8	+11.3
Conservative	M. Malbon	1,698	29.8	−7.4
Liberal	P. G. Willams	251	4.4	−3.9
Majority		2,056	36.1	+18.8
Turnout		5,703	41.4	−31.4
Labour hold		Swing	+9.3	

=== Barlow Moor ===
Barlow Moor
Party	Candidate	Votes	%	±%
Labour	J. T. Maguire	1,835	48.1	+6.1
Conservative	B. Moore*	1,590	41.7	−4.2
Liberal	J. R. Marsden	364	9.5	−2.6
Independent	M. G. Gibson	25	0.7	+0.7
Majority		245	6.4	+2.5
Turnout		3,814	37.2	−30.8
Labour gain from Conservative		Swing	+5.1	

=== Beswick ===
Beswick (2 vacancies)
Party	Candidate	Votes	%	±%
Labour	J. Flanagan*	2,061	86.3	+4.8
Labour	M. Harrison	1,898	79.5	−2.0
Independent	W. C. Carman	208	8.7	N/A
Conservative	C. Hare	148	6.2	−12.3
Conservative	R. Plant	121	5.1	−13.4
Liberal	K. Parkinson	109	4.6	N/A
Majority		1,690	70.8	+7.8
Turnout		2,388	34.1	−27.1
Labour hold		Swing		
Labour hold		Swing	-4.0	

=== Blackley ===
Blackley
Party	Candidate	Votes	%	±%
Labour	W. Risby*	2,910	61.0	+12.7
Conservative	H. P. Cummins	1,659	34.8	−9.0
Liberal	N. Towers	201	4.2	−3.7
Majority		1,251	26.2	+21.7
Turnout		4,770	42.9	−31.9
Labour hold		Swing	+10.8	

=== Bradford ===
Bradford
Party	Candidate	Votes	%	±%
Labour	Bill Egerton*	2,691	70.0	+6.1
Conservative	L. Hockey	981	25.5	−5.1
Liberal	L. Towers	172	4.5	−1.0
Majority		1,710	44.5	+11.3
Turnout		3,844	32.6	−37.1
Labour hold		Swing	+5.6	

=== Brooklands ===
Brooklands
Party	Candidate	Votes	%	±%
Labour	K. Barnes	3,285	56.9	+8.8
Conservative	G. Fitzsimons*	2,231	38.6	−5.1
Liberal	G. Dulson	260	4.5	−3.7
Majority		1,054	18.2	+13.8
Turnout		5,776	46.0	−28.9
Labour gain from Conservative		Swing	+6.9	

=== Burnage ===
Burnage
Party	Candidate	Votes	%	±%
Labour	G. J. Martin	2,503	49.8	+6.7
Conservative	R. Nicholson	2,045	40.7	−5.6
Liberal	C. Dowse	474	9.4	−1.2
Majority		458	9.1	
Turnout		5,022	44.1	−30.5
Labour gain from Conservative		Swing	+6.1	

=== Charlestown ===
Charlestown
Party	Candidate	Votes	%	±%
Labour	N. Morris*	2,608	62.2	+11.0
Conservative	C. Maffei	1,348	32.1	−8.0
Liberal	J. Mawson	239	5.7	−3.0
Majority		1,260	30.0	+18.8
Turnout		4,195	42.9	−33.8
Labour hold		Swing	+9.5	

=== Cheetham ===
Cheetham
Party	Candidate	Votes	%	±%
Labour	D. G. Ford*	1,785	71.6	+5.5
Conservative	K. Taylor	613	24.6	−3.8
Liberal	R. A. Bell	94	3.8	−1.7
Majority		1,172	47.0	+9.3
Turnout		2,492	34.4	−31.1
Labour hold		Swing	+4.6	

=== Chorlton ===
Chorlton
Party	Candidate	Votes	%	±%
Conservative	M. Vince*	2,267	47.1	−3.9
Labour	H. Brown	2,067	43.0	+7.2
Liberal	J. Commons	421	8.8	−4.4
Communist	B. E. Struszckak	54	1.1	+1.1
Majority		200	4.2	−11.0
Turnout		4,809	43.7	−32.2
Conservative hold		Swing	+5.5	

=== Collegiate Church ===
Collegiate Church
Party	Candidate	Votes	%	±%
Labour	J. Bradley	894	77.5	+13.9
Conservative	P. Snell	192	16.7	−11.0
Liberal	I. Wilde	67	5.8	−3.0
Majority		702	60.9	+25.0
Turnout		1,153	26.4	−27.4
Labour hold		Swing	+12.4	

=== Crossacres ===
Crossacres
Party	Candidate	Votes	%	±%
Labour	K. Lim	3,463	70.4	+10.3
Conservative	A. Spencer	956	19.4	−5.9
Liberal	J. Southward	500	10.2	−4.4
Majority		2,507	51.0	+16.2
Turnout		4,919	36.9	−33.6
Labour hold		Swing	+8.1	

=== Crumpsall ===
Crumpsall
Party	Candidate	Votes	%	±%
Labour	N. W. Harrison	2,230	50.8	+8.1
Conservative	W. L. Clapham*	1,919	43.7	−3.3
Liberal	K. Osbourne	238	5.4	−5.0
Majority		311	7.1	+2.8
Turnout		4,387	38.8	−32.7
Labour gain from Conservative		Swing	+5.7	

=== Didsbury ===
Didsbury
Party	Candidate	Votes	%	±%
Conservative	J. Duke*	3,082	59.2	+2.8
Labour	N. Siddiqi	1,080	20.7	−4.8
Liberal	G. Shaw	1,045	20.1	+2.0
Majority		2,002	38.4	+7.4
Turnout		5,207	41.2	−35.6
Conservative hold		Swing	+3.8	

=== Gorton North ===
Gorton North
Party	Candidate	Votes	%	±%
Labour	C. Brierley	2,729	75.3	+12.1
Conservative	C. H. T. Webb	736	20.3	−9.8
Liberal	J. M. Hodgson	161	4.4	−2.3
Majority		1,993	55.0	+21.9
Turnout		3,626	42.7	−30.5
Labour hold		Swing	+10.9	

=== Gorton South ===
Gorton South
Party	Candidate	Votes	%	±%
Labour	D. Barker*	2,207	67.9	+6.8
Conservative	D. Heywood	925	28.5	−3.3
Liberal	J. Rhodes	118	3.6	−3.6
Majority		1,282	39.4	+10.1
Turnout		3,250	37.5	−33.4
Labour hold		Swing	+5.0	

=== Harpurhey ===
Harpurhey (2 vacancies)
Party	Candidate	Votes	%	±%
Labour	A. Lister	1,463	57.6	−7.0
Labour	H. Reid*	1,433	56.5	−8.1
Conservative	J. Harding	511	20.1	−9.2
Conservative	F. Meaden	449	17.7	−11.6
Liberal	J. Ashley	425	16.7	+10.6
Liberal	T. M. Broderick	387	15.2	+9.1
Majority		922	36.3	+1.0
Turnout		2,538	37.4	−28.0
Labour hold		Swing		
Labour hold		Swing	+2.2	

=== Hulme ===
Hulme
Party	Candidate	Votes	%	±%
Labour	T. Thomas*	2,008	73.8	+5.2
Liberal	P. Thompson	329	12.1	+1.5
Conservative	N. P. Shand	295	10.8	−7.6
Independent	D. S. Redford	88	3.2	+3.2
Majority		1,679	61.7	+11.5
Turnout		2,720	29.3	−32.3
Labour hold		Swing	+1.8	

=== Levenshulme ===
Levenshulme
Party	Candidate	Votes	%	±%
Liberal	H. Smith	2,105	40.2	+3.6
Labour	R. M. Pilkington	1,962	37.5	+3.4
Conservative	W. Carlton*	1,171	22.4	−6.9
Majority		143	2.7	+0.2
Turnout		5,238	42.2	−30.0
Liberal gain from Conservative		Swing	+0.1	

=== Lightbowne ===
Lightbowne
Party	Candidate	Votes	%	±%
Labour	A. D. Kelly	2,632	61.0	+5.8
Conservative	G. Cleworth*	1,459	33.8	−1.5
Liberal	B. V. Roberts	224	5.2	−4.2
Majority		1,173	27.2	+7.3
Turnout		4,315	41.3	−33.5
Labour gain from Conservative		Swing	+3.6	

=== Lloyd Street ===
Lloyd Street
Party	Candidate	Votes	%	±%
Labour	K. McKeon*	2,679	69.2	+13.2
Conservative	R. E. Bevan	1,035	26.7	−8.4
Liberal	E. Thompson	156	4.0	−2.8
Majority		1,644	42.5	+21.6
Turnout		3,870	33.0	−36.3
Labour hold		Swing	+10.8	

=== Longsight ===
Longsight
Party	Candidate	Votes	%	±%
Labour	R. W. Ford*	1,905	58.8	−1.5
Conservative	A. Malpas	974	30.1	−1.2
Liberal	M. Amin	269	8.3	−0.1
Communist	M. Cowie	91	2.8	+2.8
Majority		931	28.7	−0.4
Turnout		3,239	33.0	−33.8
Labour hold		Swing	+0.1	

=== Miles Platting ===
Miles Platting
Party	Candidate	Votes	%	±%
Labour	R. Latham*	1,905	90.3	+13.5
Conservative	A. E. Halliday	148	7.0	−10.7
Liberal	P. Bailey	57	2.7	−2.8
Majority		1,757	83.3	+24.2
Turnout		2,110	31.1	−30.9
Labour hold		Swing	+12.1	

=== Moss Side ===
Moss Side
Party	Candidate	Votes	%	±%
Labour	H. Paget*	1,626	75.9	+8.4
Conservative	J. M. Goldsby	349	16.3	−6.5
Liberal	L. Ford	167	7.8	−1.9
Majority		1,277	59.6	+14.9
Turnout		2,142	30.2	−33.3
Labour hold		Swing	+7.4	

=== Moston ===
Moston
Party	Candidate	Votes	%	±%
Labour	D. Shaw	2,788	52.0	+5.7
Conservative	K. E. Goulding*	2,310	43.1	−0.8
Liberal	J. Cookson	265	4.9	−4.9
Majority		478	8.9	+6.4
Turnout		5,363	45.2	−32.0
Labour gain from Conservative		Swing	+3.2	

=== Newton Heath ===
Newton Heath
Party	Candidate	Votes	%	±%
Labour	C. Tomlinson*	2,549	64.4	+4.0
Conservative	A. E. Walsh	1,190	30.1	−5.8
Liberal	V. Towers	221	5.6	+1.9
Majority		1,359	34.3	+9.8
Turnout		3,960	38.4	−32.0
Labour hold		Swing	+4.9	

=== Northenden ===
Northenden
Party	Candidate	Votes	%	±%
Labour	R. A. Reddington	2,964	53.5	+7.9
Conservative	C. H. Box*	2,089	37.7	−5.6
Liberal	J. Holland	487	8.8	−1.1
Majority		875	15.8	+13.5
Turnout		5,540	46.2	−28.9
Labour gain from Conservative		Swing	+6.7	

=== Old Moat ===
Old Moat
Party	Candidate	Votes	%	±%
Labour	A. C. Thomas	1,827	44.0	+2.6
Conservative	W. H. Aikman*	1,551	37.3	−2.4
Liberal	C. Adamson	776	18.7	−0.2
Majority		276	6.6	+4.9
Turnout		4,154	42.1	−30.4
Labour gain from Conservative		Swing	+2.5	

=== Rusholme ===
Rusholme
Party	Candidate	Votes	%	±%
Labour	J. Nicholson	2,537	51.3	+9.0
Conservative	K. Ollerenshaw*	1,765	35.7	−5.2
Liberal	D. Senior	352	7.1	−2.6
Ecology	D. Dalton	295	6.0	−1.1
Majority		772	15.6	+14.3
Turnout		4,949	34.2	−31.6
Labour gain from Conservative		Swing	+7.1	

=== Withington ===
Withington
Party	Candidate	Votes	%	±%
Conservative	J. M. Jacobs	1,762	34.7	−1.3
Liberal	J. Edwards	1,709	33.6	−5.3
Labour	W. M. Jameson	1,610	31.7	+6.6
Majority		53	1.0	−1.8
Turnout		5,081	45.6	−27.7
Conservative hold		Swing	+2.0	

=== Woodhouse Park ===
Woodhouse Park
Party	Candidate	Votes	%	±%
Labour	T. Farrell*	3,021	70.4	+8.9
Conservative	J. A. Graham	802	18.7	−7.9
Liberal	L. Griffiths	392	9.1	−2.8
Socialist Workers	J. N. Taylor	75	1.7	+1.7
Majority		2,219	51.7	+16.8
Turnout		4,290	40.1	−31.5
Labour hold		Swing	+8.4	

== By-elections between 1980 and 1982 ==
=== Gorton South, 25 September 1980 ===
Caused by the death of Councillor Harry Conway (Labour, Gorton South, elected 13 May 1965) on 28 March 1980.

Gorton South
Party	Candidate	Votes	%	±%
Labour	Roy Sadler	1,708	67.0	−0.9
Conservative	Doris Heywood	531	20.8	−7.7
Liberal	David Senior	309	12.1	+8.5
Majority		1,177	46.2	+6.8
Turnout		2,548	32.3	−5.2
Labour hold		Swing	+3.4	

=== Blackley, 2 April 1981 ===
Caused by the resignation of Councillor Phil Loxley (Conservative, Blackley, elected 4 May 1978) on 15 December 1980.

Blackley
Party	Candidate	Votes	%	±%
Labour	George Chadwick	2,287	61.5	+0.5
Conservative	Valerie Hall	922	24.8	−10.0
Liberal	John Cookson	510	13.7	+9.5
Majority		1,365	36.7	+10.2
Turnout		3,719	33.4	−9.5
Labour gain from Conservative		Swing	+5.2	

=== Old Moat, 9 July 1981 ===
Caused by the resignation of Councillor Andrew Thomas (Labour, Old Moat, elected 1 May 1980) on 30 May 1981.

Old Moat
Party	Candidate	Votes	%	±%
Conservative	William Aikman	1,198	37.9	+0.6
Labour	Paula Sadler	1,104	34.9	−9.1
Liberal	Colin Dowse	860	27.2	+8.5
Majority		94	3.0	−3.6
Turnout		3,162	32.0	−10.1
Conservative gain from Labour		Swing	+4.8	
