= 1971 Manchester City Council election =

UK local government election

- 13 May 1971

99 of 132 seats to Manchester City Council 67 seats needed for a majority
	First party	Second party
Party	Labour	Conservative
Last election	22 seats, 46.2%	17 seats, 47.4%
Seats before	66	86
Seats won	81	18
Seats after	108	24
Seat change	▲42	▼62
Popular vote	283,756	167,964
Percentage	60.2%	35.6%
Swing	▲14.0%	▼11.8%
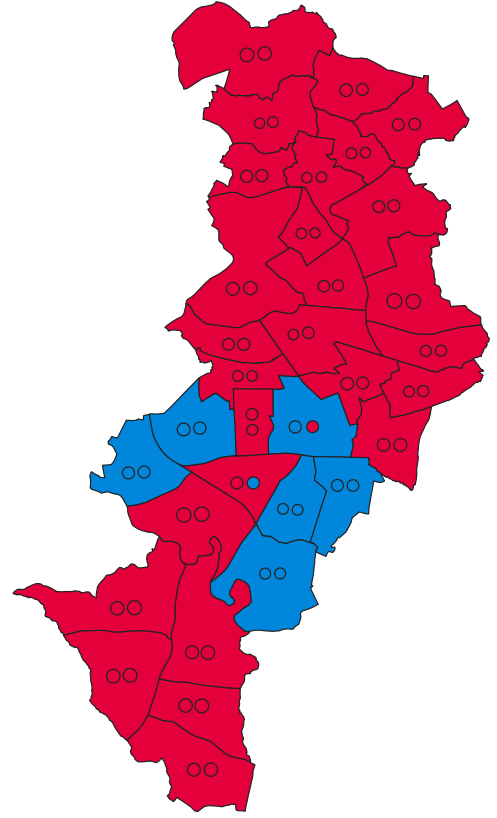
- Map of results of 1971 election
Leader of the Council before election
Conservative
Leader of the Council after election
Labour

Elections to Manchester City Council were held on Thursday, 13 May 1971. Due to boundary changes, which reduced the number of wards by five, all 99 councillors seats were up for election. In all wards, each first-placed candidate was set to serve a three-year term, expiring in 1974, second-placed candidates were set to serve a two-year term, expiring in 1973, and third-placed candidates were to serve a one-year term, expiring in 1972. However, due to the replacement of the corporation by the Local Government Act 1972, only one set of these scheduled elections ever took place.

The Labour Party gained overall control of the council from the Conservative Party, winning the largest share of seats on the council in its history up to that point.

== Election result ==
Party	Votes		Seats			Full Council	
Labour Party	283,756 (60.2%)	▲14.0	81 (81.8%)	81 / 99	▲42	108 (81.8%)	108 / 132
Conservative Party	167,964 (35.6%)	▼11.8	18 (18.2%)	18 / 99	▼62	24 (18.2%)	24 / 132
Liberal Party	11,821 (2.5%)	▼2.4	0 (0.0%)	0 / 99	Steady	0 (0.0%)	0 / 132
Communist	6,481 (1.4%)	▲1.0	0 (0.0%)	0 / 99	Steady	0 (0.0%)	0 / 132
Independent	620 (0.1%)	N/A	0 (0.0%)	0 / 99	N/A	0 (0.0%)	0 / 132
Independent Labour	471 (0.1%)	N/A	0 (0.0%)	0 / 99	N/A	0 (0.0%)	0 / 132
Residents	337 (0.1%)	▼0.9	0 (0.0%)	0 / 99	Steady	0 (0.0%)	0 / 132
Union Movement	218 (0.0%)	▼0.1	0 (0.0%)	0 / 99	Steady	0 (0.0%)	0 / 132

=== Full council ===
↓
108	24

=== Aldermen ===
↓
27	6

=== Councillors ===
↓
81	18

== Ward results ==
=== Alexandra ===
Alexandra
Party	Candidate	Votes	%	±%
Conservative	M. Flynn*	2,979	62.5	
Conservative	N. Thompson*	2,973	62.4	
Conservative	J. B. Chapman*	2,857	59.9	
Labour	K. McKeon	1,264	26.5	
Labour	S. M. Miller	1,235	25.9	
Labour	G. M. Morton	1,210	25.4	
Liberal	L. J. Howard	545	11.4	
Liberal	W. S. Kenyon	531	11.1	
Liberal	S. Lowe	504	10.6	
Communist	A. Fleetwood	201	4.2	
Majority		1,593	33.4	
Turnout		4,766		
Conservative win (new seat)				
Conservative win (new seat)				
Conservative win (new seat)				

=== Ardwick ===
Ardwick
Party	Candidate	Votes	%	±%
Labour	A. S. Goldstone*	2,887	81.9	
Labour	F. Dale	2,843	80.6	
Labour	H. Barrett*	2,669	75.7	
Conservative	D. Harrison	677	19.2	
Conservative	D. Taylor	655	18.6	
Conservative	G. Taylor	596	16.9	
Communist	R. Hughes	253	7.2	
Majority		1,992	56.5	
Turnout		3,527		
Labour win (new seat)				
Labour win (new seat)				
Labour win (new seat)				

=== Baguley ===
Baguley
Party	Candidate	Votes	%	±%
Labour	F. H. Price*	4,432	67.9	
Labour	C. B. Muir	4,249	65.0	
Labour	H. Brown	3,964	60.7	
Conservative	G. I. Woolard*	2,364	36.2	
Conservative	M. Malbon*	2,175	33.3	
Conservative	A. Farmer	2,134	32.7	
Communist	R. Burns	279	4.3	
Majority		1,600	24.5	
Turnout		6,532		
Labour win (new seat)				
Labour win (new seat)				
Labour win (new seat)				

=== Barlow Moor ===
Barlow Moor
Party	Candidate	Votes	%	±%
Labour	R. Grainger	1,780	44.8	
Labour	D. A. Parker	1,743	43.9	
Labour	W. A. Moody	1,738	43.8	
Conservative	H. Tucker*	1,653	41.6	
Conservative	B. Moore*	1,594	40.1	
Conservative	N. Wood	1,557	39.2	
Liberal	P. Jones	667	16.8	
Liberal	D. R. Mellor	555	14.0	
Liberal	P. J. Brindle	479	12.1	
Communist	A. J. Hunt	146	3.7	
Majority		85	2.1	
Turnout		3,971		
Labour win (new seat)				
Labour win (new seat)				
Labour win (new seat)				

=== Beswick ===
Beswick
Party	Candidate	Votes	%	±%
Labour	J. Dean*	2,609	89.8	
Labour	K. Eastham*	2,517	86.6	
Labour	J. G. Birtles*	2,280	78.5	
Conservative	D. Eastwood	585	20.1	
Conservative	A. Bradshaw	326	11.2	
Conservative	J. R. Cawley	310	10.7	
Communist	J. Coupe	92	3.2	
Majority		1,695	58.3	
Turnout		2,906		
Labour win (new seat)				
Labour win (new seat)				
Labour win (new seat)				

=== Blackley ===
Blackley
Party	Candidate	Votes	%	±%
Labour	A. A. Johnson	3,396	68.1	
Labour	J. E. Jackson	3,344	67.0	
Labour	J. I. Owen	3,280	65.7	
Conservative	E. D. Kirkup*	1,688	33.8	
Conservative	D. F. Silverman*	1,554	31.1	
Conservative	N. Pritchard*	1,547	31.0	
Communist	I. W. Luft	157	3.1	
Majority		1,592	31.9	
Turnout		4,989		
Labour win (new seat)				
Labour win (new seat)				
Labour win (new seat)				

=== Bradford ===
Bradford
Party	Candidate	Votes	%	±%
Labour	J. Gilmore*	4,662	78.2	
Labour	J. Taylor*	4,433	74.4	
Labour	W. Egerton*	4,302	72.2	
Conservative	D. Lear	1,568	26.3	
Conservative	A. P. Osborn	1,345	22.6	
Conservative	M. Withers	1,303	21.9	
Communist	E. R. Prior	269	4.5	
Majority		2,734	45.9	
Turnout		5,961		
Labour win (new seat)				
Labour win (new seat)				
Labour win (new seat)				

=== Brooklands ===
Brooklands
Party	Candidate	Votes	%	±%
Labour	D. Healy	3,960	61.1	
Labour	F. Firth	3,938	60.7	
Labour	E. Mellor	3,667	56.5	
Conservative	Y. I. Emery	2,599	40.1	
Conservative	A. A. O'Connor	2,502	38.6	
Conservative	B. B. Williams*	2,487	38.3	
Communist	E. R. Whitworth	306	4.7	
Majority		1,068	16.5	
Turnout		6,486		
Labour win (new seat)				
Labour win (new seat)				
Labour win (new seat)				

=== Burnage ===
Burnage
Party	Candidate	Votes	%	±%
Conservative	H. Platt*	2,612	53.5	
Conservative	L. Howarth*	2,570	52.7	
Conservative	W. I. Lund*	2,569	52.7	
Labour	T. T. Farrell	2,296	47.1	
Labour	S. Corless	2,256	46.2	
Labour	P. Bednarski	2,087	42.8	
Communist	N. J. Gilroy	243	5.0	
Majority		273	5.6	
Turnout		4,878		
Conservative win (new seat)				
Conservative win (new seat)				
Conservative win (new seat)				

=== Charlestown ===
Charlestown
Party	Candidate	Votes	%	±%
Labour	L. Kelly	2,550	64.0	
Labour	J. S. Goldstone*	2,466	61.9	
Labour	S. C. Silverman	2,405	60.4	
Conservative	L. H. Neild	1,293	32.5	
Conservative	A. W. Ash	1,256	31.5	
Conservative	R. E. Doweck	1,207	30.3	
Liberal	J. M. Ashley	635	15.9	
Communist	R. L. Cole	138	3.5	
Majority		1,112	27.9	
Turnout		3,983		
Labour win (new seat)				
Labour win (new seat)				
Labour win (new seat)				

=== Cheetham ===
Cheetham
Party	Candidate	Votes	%	±%
Labour	D. G. Ford*	2,100	73.6	
Labour	S. V. Shaw*	2,068	72.4	
Labour	J. Broderick*	2,018	70.7	
Conservative	A. Fildes	783	27.4	
Conservative	F. E. Meaden	772	27.0	
Conservative	A. E. Welsby	693	24.3	
Communist	M. E. Hooley	132	4.6	
Majority		1,235	43.3	
Turnout		2,855		
Labour win (new seat)				
Labour win (new seat)				
Labour win (new seat)				

=== Chorlton ===
Chorlton
Party	Candidate	Votes	%	±%
Conservative	L. Sanders*	2,747	58.9	
Conservative	M. A. Vince*	2,714	58.2	
Conservative	M. Delavan	2,561	54.9	
Labour	R. J. Williamson	1,933	41.5	
Labour	G. H. Yeadon	1,906	40.9	
Labour	J. J. Fanning	1,900	40.7	
Communist	D. J. Heywood	227	4.9	
Majority		628	13.5	
Turnout		4,663		
Conservative win (new seat)				
Conservative win (new seat)				
Conservative win (new seat)				

=== Collegiate Church ===
Collegiate Church
Party	Candidate	Votes	%	±%
Labour	R. F. Delahunty*	1,238	84.2	
Labour	S. A. Ogden*	1,235	84.0	
Labour	F. J. Balcombe*	1,223	83.2	
Conservative	J. Cartland	235	16.0	
Conservative	R. J. R. Lomas	213	14.5	
Conservative	K. West	192	13.1	
Communist	T. E. Keenan	75	5.1	
Majority		988	67.2	
Turnout		1,470		
Labour win (new seat)				
Labour win (new seat)				
Labour win (new seat)				

=== Crossacres ===
Crossacres
Party	Candidate	Votes	%	±%
Labour	N. Morris*	4,842	79.3	
Labour	R. L. Griffiths*	4,587	75.1	
Labour	A. Roberts	4,341	71.1	
Conservative	J. Jones	1,744	28.6	
Conservative	D. O'Sullivan	1,285	21.0	
Conservative	D. R. Westhead	1,251	20.5	
Communist	M. E. Taylor	265	4.3	
Majority		2,597	42.5	
Turnout		6,105		
Labour win (new seat)				
Labour win (new seat)				
Labour win (new seat)				

=== Crumpsall ===
Crumpsall
Party	Candidate	Votes	%	±%
Labour	J. V. Marshall	2,795	51.0	
Labour	P. A. Sless	2,789	50.9	
Labour	H. Brooks	2,649	48.4	
Conservative	F. R. Butler*	2,511	45.8	
Conservative	A. S. Daulby	2,444	44.6	
Conservative	B. H. Taylor*	2,307	42.1	
Liberal	H. Wiseberg	741	13.5	
Communist	J. A. Day	195	3.6	
Majority		138	2.5	
Turnout		5,477		
Labour win (new seat)				
Labour win (new seat)				
Labour win (new seat)				

=== Didsbury ===
Didsbury
Party	Candidate	Votes	%	±%
Conservative	M. R. Crawford*	3,793	65.7	
Conservative	J. B. W. Hill*	3,791	65.7	
Conservative	J. Duke*	3,754	65.0	
Labour	H. Evans	1,986	34.4	
Labour	M. Pickstone	1,859	32.2	
Labour	D. Beetham	1,814	31.4	
Communist	D. P. Devine	322	5.6	
Majority		1,768	30.6	
Turnout		5,773		
Conservative win (new seat)				
Conservative win (new seat)				
Conservative win (new seat)				

=== Gorton North ===
Gorton North
Party	Candidate	Votes	%	±%
Labour	P. Roddy*	4,389	79.5	
Labour	T. O. Hamnett*	4,330	78.4	
Labour	G. Conquest*	4,150	75.2	
Conservative	J. A. Davenport	1,258	22.8	
Conservative	W. Slowe	1,109	20.1	
Conservative	A. R. Leeke	1,025	18.6	
Communist	A. Prior	304	5.5	
Majority		2,892	52.4	
Turnout		5,522		
Labour win (new seat)				
Labour win (new seat)				
Labour win (new seat)				

=== Gorton South ===
Gorton South
Party	Candidate	Votes	%	±%
Labour	D. Barker*	2,777	69.8	
Labour	H. Conway*	2,752	69.2	
Labour	K. Franklin	2,536	63.7	
Conservative	V. R. Cattan*	1,777	44.7	
Conservative	D. F. Lindsey	1,030	25.9	
Conservative	J. R. Hill	930	23.4	
Communist	M. Cowle	136	3.4	
Majority		759	19.1	
Turnout		3,979		
Labour win (new seat)				
Labour win (new seat)				
Labour win (new seat)				

=== Harpurhey ===
Harpurhey
Party	Candidate	Votes	%	±%
Labour	J. B. Ogden*	2,553	70.9	
Labour	A. Nicholson*	2,503	69.5	
Labour	S. N. M. Moxley	2,447	67.9	
Conservative	F. W. Lever*	1,107	30.7	
Conservative	J. Holden*	1,042	28.9	
Conservative	V. M. Taylor*	1,016	28.2	
Communist	S. Cole	138	3.8	
Majority		1,340	37.2	
Turnout		3,602		
Labour win (new seat)				
Labour win (new seat)				
Labour win (new seat)				

=== Hulme ===
Hulme
Party	Candidate	Votes	%	±%
Labour	G. Mann*	2,589	84.9	
Labour	T. Thomas*	2,554	83.7	
Labour	F. Hatton*	2,542	83.3	
Conservative	M. Meadows	423	13.9	
Conservative	J. H. Wood	376	12.3	
Liberal	A. G. Lishman	292	9.6	
Conservative	S. J. S. Bentley	290	9.5	
Communist	F. J. Cartwright*	85	2.8	
Majority		2,119	69.5	
Turnout		3,050		
Labour win (new seat)				
Labour win (new seat)				
Labour win (new seat)				

=== Levenshulme ===
Levenshulme
Party	Candidate	Votes	%	±%
Labour	C. Brierley	3,049	55.6	
Labour	N. I. Finley	3,047	55.8	
Labour	A. E. Jones	2,945	53.9	
Conservative	M. M. Hart*	2,420	44.3	
Conservative	J. K. Barber*	2,404	44.0	
Conservative	A. Williamson	2,307	42.3	
Communist	M. T. Worrall	214	3.9	
Majority		525	9.6	
Turnout		5,459		
Labour win (new seat)				
Labour win (new seat)				
Labour win (new seat)				

=== Lightbowne ===
Lightbowne
Party	Candidate	Votes	%	±%
Labour	H. T. Lee	3,383	57.8	
Labour	S. Smith	3,302	56.4	
Labour	R. A. Reddington	3,297	56.3	
Conservative	J. Jackson*	1,830	31.3	
Conservative	N. A. Green*	1,819	31.1	
Conservative	E. Jones	1,770	30.3	
Liberal	H. Roche	843	14.4	
Liberal	R. Jackson	713	12.2	
Liberal	G. H. Wilkinson	597	11.9	
Majority		1,467	25.1	
Turnout		5,851		
Labour win (new seat)				
Labour win (new seat)				
Labour win (new seat)				

=== Lloyd Street ===
Lloyd Street
Party	Candidate	Votes	%	±%
Labour	J. Taylor	3,503	63.0	
Labour	J. Davis*	3,351	60.3	
Labour	W. Massey*	3,240	58.3	
Conservative	J. Pollitt*	2,186	39.3	
Conservative	P. M. Nixon*	2,185	39.3	
Conservative	A. H. Burlin*	1,928	34.7	
Communist	W. Hamilton	290	5.2	
Majority		1,054	19.0	
Turnout		5,561		
Labour win (new seat)				
Labour win (new seat)				
Labour win (new seat)				

=== Longsight ===
Longsight
Party	Candidate	Votes	%	±%
Labour	B. Anderson	3,142	59.6	
Labour	R. W. Ford	3,005	57.0	
Labour	M. A. Naqui	2,950	55.9	
Conservative	A. B. Deacy*	1,925	36.5	
Conservative	A. Malpas*	1,906	36.1	
Conservative	F. Coombs*	1,893	35.9	
Independent	S. Khan	357	6.8	
Independent	A. Ahmed	263	5.0	
Union Movement	G. S. Gee	218	4.1	
Communist	H. Johnson	162	3.1	
Majority		1,025	19.4	
Turnout		5,274		
Labour win (new seat)				
Labour win (new seat)				
Labour win (new seat)				

=== Miles Platting ===
Miles Platting
Party	Candidate	Votes	%	±%
Labour	E. Donoghue*	2,732	90.6	
Labour	E. Crank*	2,731	90.6	
Labour	R. Latham*	2,618	86.9	
Conservative	D. Porter	292	9.7	
Conservative	P. J. Sturrock	238	7.9	
Conservative	A. R. Whittle	225	7.5	
Communist	R. G. A. Cole	205	6.8	
Majority		2,326	77.2	
Turnout		3,014		
Labour win (new seat)				
Labour win (new seat)				
Labour win (new seat)				

=== Moss Side ===
Moss Side
Party	Candidate	Votes	%	±%
Labour	W. A. Downward*	2,665	70.9	
Labour	H. P. D. Paget*	2,613	69.5	
Labour	R. E. Talbot	2,594	69.0	
Conservative	W. B. Goodrick	1,194	31.7	
Conservative	R. E. Powell	1,068	28.4	
Conservative	E. M. Bevan	988	26.3	
Communist	W. Woolery	160	4.3	
Majority		1,400	37.2	
Turnout		3,761		
Labour win (new seat)				
Labour win (new seat)				
Labour win (new seat)				

=== Moston ===
Moston
Party	Candidate	Votes	%	±%
Labour	A. E. Bowden*	3,647	62.8	
Labour	W. T. Risby	3,320	57.1	
Labour	W. Lister	3,290	56.6	
Conservative	J. T. Crawford*	2,162	37.2	
Conservative	T. W. R. Bamford	2,083	35.9	
Conservative	K. E. Goulding	1,855	31.9	
Liberal	F. I. Garrard	325	5.6	
Liberal	G. Garrard	311	5.4	
Liberal	P. Witherington	287	4.9	
Communist	G. K. Gray	151	2.6	
Majority		1,128	19.4	
Turnout		5,810		
Labour win (new seat)				
Labour win (new seat)				
Labour win (new seat)				

=== Newton Heath ===
Newton Heath
Party	Candidate	Votes	%	±%
Labour	M. J. Taylor*	3,716	76.1	
Labour	C. Tomlinson*	3,696	75.7	
Labour	J. Smith	3,374	69.1	
Conservative	A. E. Walsh	1,293	26.5	
Conservative	H. Ryan	1,218	24.9	
Conservative	J. McCabe	1,176	24.1	
Communist	J. B. Cross	172	3.5	
Majority		2,081	42.6	
Turnout		4,882		
Labour win (new seat)				
Labour win (new seat)				
Labour win (new seat)				

=== Northenden ===
Northenden
Party	Candidate	Votes	%	±%
Labour	W. J. Courtney	3,465	53.2	
Labour	J. M. Wilson	3,420	52.6	
Labour	G. Berry	3,379	51.9	
Conservative	G. Leigh*	3,039	46.7	
Conservative	C. H. Box*	3,007	46.2	
Conservative	T. Mountford*	2,998	46.1	
Communist	E. Jackson	215	3.3	
Majority		340	5.2	
Turnout		6,508		
Labour win (new seat)				
Labour win (new seat)				
Labour win (new seat)				

=== Old Moat ===
Old Moat
Party	Candidate	Votes	%	±%
Labour	A. J. Spencer	2,470	50.4	
Labour	A. J. Bateman	2,385	48.7	
Conservative	T. F. Lavin*	2,381	48.6	
Labour	A. P. Marino	2,380	48.6	
Conservative	G. Robinson	2,292	46.8	
Conservative	D. G. Massey	2,284	46.6	
Residents	D. R. Brown	337	6,9	
Communist	D. Maher	177	3.6	
Majority		1	0.0	
Turnout		4,902		
Labour win (new seat)				
Labour win (new seat)				
Conservative win (new seat)				

=== Rusholme ===
Rusholme
Party	Candidate	Votes	%	±%
Conservative	M. Pierce*	2,418	49.0	
Conservative	S. Tucker*	2,397	48.6	
Labour	L. J. Lamb	2,332	47.3	
Conservative	T. Phillips*	2,296	46.5	
Labour	D. Cox	2,244	45.5	
Labour	P. M. Morrison	2,178	44.2	
Liberal	F. N. Wedlock	557	11.3	
Communist	G. H. Mills	378	7.7	
Majority		36	0.7	
Turnout		4,933		
Conservative win (new seat)				
Conservative win (new seat)				
Labour win (new seat)				

=== Withington ===
Withington
Party	Candidate	Votes	%	±%
Conservative	E. R. Coker*	2,387	46.4	
Conservative	W. Crabtree*	2,233	43.4	
Conservative	G. W. Young*	2,140	41.6	
Labour	R. K. Litherland	1,783	34.7	
Labour	H. Reid	1,758	34.2	
Labour	C. W. Warwood	1,689	32.9	
Liberal	J. S. Alldridge	1,247	24.3	
Liberal	J. L. Edwards	1,044	20.3	
Liberal	J. A. Hamilton	948	18.4	
Communist	J. Frankenberg	191	3.7	
Majority		357	6.9	
Turnout		5,140		
Conservative win (new seat)				
Conservative win (new seat)				
Conservative win (new seat)				

=== Woodhouse Park ===
Woodhouse Park
Party	Candidate	Votes	%	±%
Labour	K. Roberts*	4,569	81.2	
Labour	W. Smith*	4,476	79.5	
Labour	G. Hall*	4,151	73.7	
Conservative	G. Parry	1,024	18.2	
Conservative	C. R. Moore	1,012	18.0	
Conservative	F. Keenan	983	17.5	
Independent Labour	A. Tatton	471	8.4	
Communist	E. Holt	203	3.6	
Majority		3,127	55.5	
Turnout		5,630		
Labour win (new seat)				
Labour win (new seat)				
Labour win (new seat)				

== Aldermanic elections ==
=== Aldermanic election, 26 May 1971 ===
Aldermanic elections took place during the council's first meeting on 26 May 1971, all aldermanic seats were up for election.

Party	Alderman	Ward	Term expires
Labour	James Birtles	Blackley	1977
Labour	Ken Collis	Gorton North	1977
Labour	William Downward	Burnage	1977
Conservative	Douglas Edwards*	Chorlton	1974
Labour	Thomas Farrell*	Charlestown	1974
Conservative	Arnold Fieldhouse*	Withington	1974
Labour	Rachel Finkel	Rusholme	1974
Labour	Harry Gatley*	Harpurhey	1977
Labour	Edward Grant*	Northenden	1974
Conservative	Sir R. S. Harper*	Alexandra	1974
Labour	Frank Hatton	Collegiate Church	1977
Labour	Stanley Jolly*	Levenshulme	1974
Labour	Clifford Lamb*	Moss Side	1974
Labour	Bernard Langton*	Cheetham	1974
Conservative	Dorothy Lee*	Crumpsall	1974
Labour	Sir Leslie Lever*	Woodhouse Park	1977
Labour	Alfred Logan*	Moston	1977
Labour	Robert Malcolm*	Miles Platting	1977
Labour	George Mann	Beswick	1977
Labour	Winifred Massey	Crossacres	1977
Labourl	Norman Morris	Newton Heath	1974
Labour	William Murray*	Old Moat	1977
Labour	Joe Ogden	Baguley	1974
Conservative	Dame Kathleen Ollerenshaw*	Longsight	19777
Labour	Tom Regan*	Lloyd Street	1977
Labour	Patrick Roddy	Brooklands	1974
Conservative	Robert Rodgers*	Barlow Moor	1977
Labour	Wilfred Shaw	Hulme	1974
Labour	Winifred Smith	Gorton South	1974
Labour	Joe Taylor	Didsbury	1974
Labour	Lily Thomas*	Lightbowne	1977
Labour	Sir Bob Thomas*	Bradford	1977
Labour	Dame Elizabeth Yarwood*	Ardwick	1974

== By-elections between 1971 and 1972 ==
=== By-elections, 8 July 1971 ===
Nine by-elections were held on 8 July 1971 to fill vacancies created by the appointment of aldermen on 26 May 1971.

==== Beswick ====
Caused by the election as an alderman of Councillor James Birtles (Labour, Beswick, elected 22 September 1955) to fill the vacancy that emerged as a result of ward reorganisation.

Beswick
Party	Candidate	Votes	%	±%
Labour	S. Corless	1,522	88.3	−1.5
Conservative	D. Eastwood	133	7.7	−14.4
Independent	J. Lewis	68	3.9	N/A
Majority		1,389	80.6	+22.3
Turnout		1,723		
Labour hold		Swing		

==== Bradford ====
Caused by the election as an alderman of Councillor Joe Taylor (Labour, Bradford, elected 15 July 1954) to fill the vacancy that emerged as a result of ward reorganisation.

Bradford
Party	Candidate	Votes	%	±%
Labour	R. Massey	2,133	65.6	−12.6
Conservative	D. F. Silverman	1,120	34.3	+8.1
Majority		1,013	31.1	−14.8
Turnout		3,253		
Labour hold		Swing		

==== Crossacres ====
Caused by the election as an alderman of Councillor Norman Morris (Labour, Crossacres, elected 10 May 1956) to fill the vacancy that emerged as a result of ward reorganisation.

Crossacres
Party	Candidate	Votes	%	±%
Labour	H. Reid	1,887	77.2	−2.1
Conservative	D. R. Westhead	558	22.8	−5.8
Majority		1,329	54.4	+11.9
Turnout		2,445		
Labour hold		Swing		

==== Gorton North ====
Caused by the election as an alderman of Councillor Patrick Roddy (Labour, Gorton North, elected 10 December 1953) to fill the vacancy that emerged as a result of ward reorganisation.

Gorton North
Party	Candidate	Votes	%	±%
Labour	P. Bednarski	2,121	87.5	+8.0
Conservative	A. R. Leeke	304	12.5	−10.3
Majority		1,817	74.9	+22.5
Turnout		2,425		
Labour hold		Swing		

==== Harpurhey ====
Caused by the election as an alderman of Councillor Joe Ogden (Labour, Harpurhey, elected 7 May 1953) to fill the vacancy that emerged as a result of ward reorganisation.

Harpurhey
Party	Candidate	Votes	%	±%
Labour	R. K. Litherland	1,305	76.8	+5.9
Conservative	F. W. Lever	395	23.2	−7.4
Majority		910	53.5	+16.3
Turnout		1,700		
Labour hold		Swing		

==== Hulme ====
Caused by the elections as aldermen of Councillor George Mann (Labour, Hulme, elected 7 May 1953) and Councillor Frank Hatton (Labour, Hulme, elected 13 May 1954) to fill vacancies that emerged as a result of ward reorganisation.

Hulme (2 vacancies)
Party	Candidate	Votes	%	±%
Labour	G. M. Morton	1,214	84.5	−0.4
Labour	A. P. Marino	1,211	84.3	−0.6
Liberal	A. G. Lishman	214	15.9	+6.3
Conservative	M. Meadows	142	9.9	−4.0
Conservative	R. Frere	92	6.4	−7.5
Majority		997	69.4	−0.1
Turnout		1,437		
Labour hold		Swing		

==== Lloyd Street ====
Caused by the election as an alderman of Councillor Winifred Massey (Labour, Lloyd Street, elected 8 May 1969; previously 1952-55 and 1956-68) to fill the vacancy that emerged as a result of ward reorganisation.

Lloyd Street
Party	Candidate	Votes	%	±%
Labour	K. McKeon	1,947	56.9	−6.1
Conservative	W. R. Swan	1,472	43.1	+3.8
Majority		475	13.8	−5.2
Turnout		3,419		
Labour hold		Swing		

==== Moss Side ====
Caused by the election as an alderman of Councillor William Downward (Labour, Moss Side, elected 18 September 1969; previously 1946-50, 1952-55, and 1956-68) to fill the vacancy that emerged as a result of ward reorganisation.

Moss Side
Party	Candidate	Votes	%	±%
Labour	D. Beetham	1,766	76.5	+5.6
Conservative	W. B. Goodrick	541	23.5	−8.2
Majority		1,225	53.0	+15.
Turnout		2,307		
Labour hold		Swing		

==== Woodhouse Park ====
Caused by the election as an alderman of Councillor Winifred Smith (Labour, Woodhouse Park, elected 13 May 1954) to fill the vacancy that emerged as a result of ward reorganisation.

Woodhouse Park
Party	Candidate	Votes	%	±%
Labour	T. Farrell	2,276	84.3	+3.1
Conservative	G. Parry	425	15.7	−2.5
Majority		1,851	68.5	+13.0
Turnout		2,701		
Labour hold		Swing		
