= 1975 Manchester City Council election =

1975 UK local government election

- 1 May 1975

34 of 99 seats to Manchester City Council 50 seats needed for a majority
| | First party | Second party |
|---|---|---|
| Leader | Norman Morris | Robert Rodgers |
| Party | Labour | Conservative |
| Leader's seat | Charlestown | Alexandra |
| Last election | 59 seats, 47.2% | 40 seats, 45.9% |
| Seats before | 59 | 40 |
| Seats won | 15 | 19 |
| Seats after | 54 | 45 |
| Seat change | ▼5 | ▲5 |
| Popular vote | 41,341 | 53,378 |
| Percentage | 38.8% | 50.1% |
| Swing | ▼8.4% | ▲4.2% |
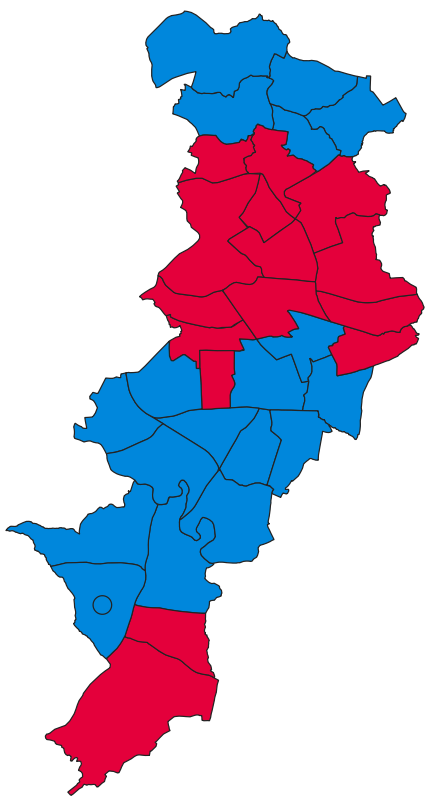
- Map of results of 1975 election
Leader of the Council before election
Norman Morris
Labour
Leader of the Council after election
Norman Morris
Labour

Elections to Manchester City Council were held on Thursday, 1 May 1975. One third of the council was up for election, with each successful candidate to serve a four-year term of office, expiring in 1979. These were the first Borough elections to be held in Manchester since it received its new Royal Charter (and effectively took over from its predecessor Corporation) in 1974. The Labour Party retained overall control of the Council.

== Election result ==
| Party | Votes | | Seats | | | Full Council | |
| Labour Party | 41,341 (38.8%) | ▼8.4 | 15 (44.1%) | 15 / 34 | ▼5 | 54 (54.4%) | 54 / 99 |
| Conservative Party | 53,378 (50.1%) | ▲4.2 | 19 (55.9%) | 19 / 34 | ▲5 | 45 (45.5%) | 45 / 99 |
| Liberal Party | 9,937 (9.3%) | ▲4.8 | 0 (0.0%) | 0 / 34 | Steady | 0 (0.0%) | 0 / 99 |
| Residents | 135 (0.7%) | ▼0.7 | 0 (0.0%) | 0 / 34 | Steady | 0 (0.0%) | 0 / 99 |
| Independent | 517 (0.5%) | ▲0.3 | 0 (0.0%) | 0 / 34 | Steady | 0 (0.0%) | 0 / 99 |
| Communist | 279 (0.2%) | ▼0.2 | 0 (0.0%) | 0 / 34 | Steady | 0 (0.0%) | 0 / 99 |
| National Front | 246 (0.2%) | N/A | 0 (0.0%) | 0 / 34 | N/A | 0 (0.0%) | 0 / 99 |

↓
| 54 | 45 |

== Ward results ==
=== Alexandra ===
Alexandra
| Party | Candidate | Votes | % | ±% |
|---|---|---|---|---|
| Conservative | R. Rodgers* | 2,929 | 61.5 | +10.3 |
| Liberal | K. Summerfield | 1,005 | 21.1 | −15.1 |
| Labour | J. Comyn-Platt | 832 | 17.5 | +4.8 |
| Majority | | 341 | 40.4 | +25.4 |
| Turnout | | 4,766 | | |
| Conservative hold | | Swing | +12.7 | |

=== Ardwick ===
Ardwick
| Party | Candidate | Votes | % | ±% |
|---|---|---|---|---|
| Labour | N. I. Finley* | 1,082 | 67.8 | −10.8 |
| Conservative | L. H. Nield | 515 | 32.2 | +10.8 |
| Majority | | 567 | 35.5 | −21.6 |
| Turnout | | 1,597 | | |
| Labour hold | | Swing | -10.8 | |

=== Baguley ===
Baguley (2 vacancies)
| Party | Candidate | Votes | % | ±% |
|---|---|---|---|---|
| Conservative | M. Malbon | 2,572 | 53.8 | +9.4 |
| Conservative | J. V. Oatway | 2,526 | 52.8 | +8.4 |
| Labour | H. Brown | 2,202 | 46.1 | −7.8 |
| Labour | C. B. Muir* | 2,143 | 44.8 | −9.1 |
| Majority | | 324 | 6.8 | |
| Turnout | | 4,780 | | |
| Conservative gain from Labour | | Swing | | |
| Conservative gain from Labour | | Swing | +8.7 | |

=== Barlow Moor ===
Barlow Moor
| Party | Candidate | Votes | % | ±% |
|---|---|---|---|---|
| Conservative | H. D. Moore* | 2,083 | 64.4 | +13.1 |
| Labour | J. Winer | 1,150 | 35.6 | +6.0 |
| Majority | | 933 | 28.9 | +7.0 |
| Turnout | | 3,233 | | |
| Conservative hold | | Swing | +3.5 | |

=== Beswick ===
Beswick
| Party | Candidate | Votes | % | ±% |
|---|---|---|---|---|
| Labour | K. Eastham* | 1,282 | 79.0 | −6.8 |
| Conservative | J. R. Cawley | 341 | 21.0 | +6.8 |
| Majority | | 941 | 58.0 | −13.7 |
| Turnout | | 1,623 | | |
| Labour hold | | Swing | -6.8 | |

=== Blackley ===
Blackley
| Party | Candidate | Votes | % | ±% |
|---|---|---|---|---|
| Conservative | H. P. Cummins | 1,532 | 53.7 | +11.1 |
| Labour | S. Smith* | 1,321 | 46.3 | −11.1 |
| Majority | | 211 | 7.4 | −7.4 |
| Turnout | | 2,853 | | |
| Conservative gain from Labour | | Swing | +11.1 | |

=== Bradford ===
Bradford
| Party | Candidate | Votes | % | ±% |
|---|---|---|---|---|
| Labour | E. Grant* | 1,525 | 48.7 | −16.0 |
| Conservative | C. R. Ashton | 1,454 | 46.4 | +11.1 |
| Communist | M. Pearce | 83 | 2.6 | +2.6 |
| Independent | J. Hulse | 72 | 2.3 | +2.3 |
| Majority | | 71 | 2.3 | −27.1 |
| Turnout | | 3,134 | | |
| Labour hold | | Swing | -13.5 | |

=== Brooklands ===
Brooklands
| Party | Candidate | Votes | % | ±% |
|---|---|---|---|---|
| Conservative | A. A. O'Connor* | 2,752 | 60.7 | +5.0 |
| Labour | E. Mellor | 1,785 | 39.3 | −5.0 |
| Majority | | 967 | 21.4 | +10.0 |
| Turnout | | 4,537 | | |
| Conservative hold | | Swing | +5.0 | |

=== Burnage ===
Burnage
| Party | Candidate | Votes | % | ±% |
|---|---|---|---|---|
| Conservative | H. Platt* | 2,405 | 51.4 | −13.1 |
| Labour | E. H. Spencer | 1,518 | 32.4 | −3.0 |
| Liberal | F. Turner | 759 | 16.2 | +16.2 |
| Majority | | 887 | 18.9 | −10.1 |
| Turnout | | 4,682 | | |
| Conservative hold | | Swing | -5.0 | |

=== Charlestown ===
Charlestown
| Party | Candidate | Votes | % | ±% |
|---|---|---|---|---|
| Conservative | J. Hood | 1,640 | 52.4 | +12.0 |
| Labour | S. Silverman* | 1,488 | 47.6 | −12.0 |
| Majority | | 152 | 4.8 | −14.3 |
| Turnout | | 3,128 | | |
| Conservative gain from Labour | | Swing | +12.0 | |

=== Cheetham ===
Cheetham
| Party | Candidate | Votes | % | ±% |
|---|---|---|---|---|
| Labour | S. Shaw* | 1,130 | 62.2 | −5.6 |
| Conservative | N. Green | 687 | 37.8 | +5.6 |
| Majority | | 443 | 24.4 | −11.2 |
| Turnout | | 1,817 | | |
| Labour hold | | Swing | -5.6 | |

=== Chorlton ===
Chorlton
| Party | Candidate | Votes | % | ±% |
|---|---|---|---|---|
| Conservative | C. Franks | 2,655 | 62.1 | +8.9 |
| Labour | A. Smith | 865 | 20.2 | −1.9 |
| Liberal | W. S. Kenyon | 657 | 15.4 | −9.3 |
| National Front | T. A. Golds | 97 | 2.3 | +2.3 |
| Majority | | 1,790 | 41.9 | +13.3 |
| Turnout | | 4,274 | | |
| Conservative hold | | Swing | +5.4 | |

=== Collegiate Church ===
Collegiate Church
| Party | Candidate | Votes | % | ±% |
|---|---|---|---|---|
| Labour | J. B. Ogden* | 389 | 59.8 | −8.1 |
| Conservative | D. H. Philip | 179 | 27.5 | +13.7 |
| Liberal | J. Laslett | 82 | 12.6 | −5.5 |
| Majority | | 210 | 32.3 | −17.4 |
| Turnout | | 650 | | |
| Labour hold | | Swing | -10.9 | |

=== Crossacres ===
Crossacres
| Party | Candidate | Votes | % | ±% |
|---|---|---|---|---|
| Labour | K. Collis* | 2,017 | 46.5 | −6.6 |
| Conservative | R. W. Munn | 934 | 21.5 | +5.2 |
| Residents | K. A. Edis | 717 | 16.5 | −13.9 |
| Liberal | H. Griffiths | 605 | 13.9 | +13.9 |
| Communist | M. Taylor | 64 | 1.5 | −1.6 |
| Majority | | 1,083 | 25.0 | −0.7 |
| Turnout | | 4,337 | | |
| Labour hold | | Swing | -5.9 | |

=== Crumpsall ===
Crumpsall
| Party | Candidate | Votes | % | ±% |
|---|---|---|---|---|
| Conservative | F. W. Lever* | 2,236 | 60.3 | −3.2 |
| Labour | S. Caron | 1,054 | 28.4 | −8.0 |
| Liberal | A. E. Griffiths | 418 | 11.3 | +11.3 |
| Majority | | 1,182 | 31.9 | +4.9 |
| Turnout | | 3,708 | | |
| Conservative hold | | Swing | +2.4 | |

=== Didsbury ===
Didsbury
| Party | Candidate | Votes | % | ±% |
|---|---|---|---|---|
| Conservative | M. R. Crawford* | 3,636 | 65.8 | −6.4 |
| Liberal | R. Johnson | 993 | 18.0 | +18.0 |
| Labour | A. J. Bateman | 802 | 14.5 | −8.2 |
| Communist | D. Maher | 93 | 1.7 | −3.3 |
| Majority | | 2,643 | 47.8 | +1.8 |
| Turnout | | 5,524 | | |
| Conservative hold | | Swing | -12.2 | |

=== Gorton North ===
Gorton North
| Party | Candidate | Votes | % | ±% |
|---|---|---|---|---|
| Labour | G. Halstead | 1,332 | 54.9 | −12.1 |
| Conservative | R. J. Beale | 1,093 | 45.1 | +12.1 |
| Majority | | 239 | 9.8 | −24.2 |
| Turnout | | 2,425 | | |
| Labour hold | | Swing | -12.1 | |

=== Gorton South ===
Gorton South
| Party | Candidate | Votes | % | ±% |
|---|---|---|---|---|
| Labour | K. Franklin* | 1,197 | 56.1 | +6.1 |
| Conservative | T. Brownrigg | 935 | 43.9 | +17.1 |
| Majority | | 262 | 12.3 | +11.0 |
| Turnout | | 2,132 | | |
| Labour hold | | Swing | -5.5 | |

=== Harpurhey ===
Harpurhey
| Party | Candidate | Votes | % | ±% |
|---|---|---|---|---|
| Labour | R. F. Delahunty* | 520 | 47.8 | −15.0 |
| Conservative | D. Porter | 421 | 38.7 | +1.5 |
| Liberal | R. Addison | 147 | 13.5 | +13.5 |
| Majority | | 99 | 9.1 | −16.4 |
| Turnout | | 1,088 | | |
| Labour hold | | Swing | -8.2 | |

=== Hulme ===
Hulme
| Party | Candidate | Votes | % | ±% |
|---|---|---|---|---|
| Labour | W. Smith* | 1,262 | 67.9 | −9.7 |
| Conservative | G. B. Draycott | 363 | 19.5 | +2.1 |
| Liberal | P. Davis | 194 | 10.4 | +10.4 |
| Communist | R. H. Vaughan | 39 | 2.1 | −2.9 |
| Majority | | 899 | 48.4 | −11.8 |
| Turnout | | 1,858 | | |
| Labour hold | | Swing | -5.9 | |

=== Levenshulme ===
Levenshulme
| Party | Candidate | Votes | % | ±% |
|---|---|---|---|---|
| Conservative | S. Alexander* | 2,406 | 56.3 | −2.9 |
| Labour | P. Hildrew | 1,432 | 33.5 | −7.3 |
| Liberal | K. Osbourne | 437 | 10.2 | +10.2 |
| Majority | | 974 | 22.8 | +4.3 |
| Turnout | | 4,275 | | |
| Conservative hold | | Swing | +2.2 | |

=== Lightbowne ===
Lightbowne
| Party | Candidate | Votes | % | ±% |
|---|---|---|---|---|
| Conservative | E. Jones* | 1,546 | 38.4 | +5.8 |
| Labour | F. Done | 1,358 | 33.7 | +0.1 |
| Liberal | H. Roche | 1,122 | 27.9 | +12.0 |
| Majority | | 188 | 4.7 | +3.6 |
| Turnout | | 4,026 | | |
| Conservative hold | | Swing | +2.8 | |

=== Lloyd Street ===
Lloyd Street
| Party | Candidate | Votes | % | ±% |
|---|---|---|---|---|
| Labour | A. S. Wood* | 1,683 | 46.0 | −10.4 |
| Conservative | D. Sumberg | 1,553 | 42.5 | −1.0 |
| Liberal | R. Cowe | 419 | 11.5 | +11.4 |
| Majority | | 130 | 3.6 | −9.3 |
| Turnout | | 3,655 | | |
| Labour hold | | Swing | -4.7 | |

=== Longsight ===
Longsight
| Party | Candidate | Votes | % | ±% |
|---|---|---|---|---|
| Conservative | G. Taylor* | 1,453 | 55.0 | +5.8 |
| Labour | A. Burns | 1,189 | 45.0 | −0.7 |
| Majority | | 264 | 10.0 | +6.5 |
| Turnout | | 2,642 | | |
| Conservative hold | | Swing | +3.2 | |

=== Miles Platting ===
Miles Platting
| Party | Candidate | Votes | % | ±% |
|---|---|---|---|---|
| Labour | E. Donoghue* | 973 | 72.3 | +4.5 |
| Conservative | A. Chappell | 372 | 27.7 | +15.7 |
| Majority | | 601 | 44.7 | −11.2 |
| Turnout | | 1,345 | | |
| Labour hold | | Swing | -5.6 | |

=== Moss Side ===
Moss Side
| Party | Candidate | Votes | % | ±% |
|---|---|---|---|---|
| Labour | R. Grainger | 482 | 39.8 | −20.7 |
| Independent | T. M. McClure | 445 | 36.8 | +36.8 |
| Conservative | W. Guy | 283 | 23.4 | −10.2 |
| Majority | | 37 | 3.1 | −23.9 |
| Turnout | | 1,210 | | |
| Labour hold | | Swing | -28.7 | |

=== Moston ===
Moston
| Party | Candidate | Votes | % | ±% |
|---|---|---|---|---|
| Conservative | G. I. Jones | 2,502 | 56.5 | +7.2 |
| Labour | C. C. Lamb* | 1,420 | 32.1 | −18.6 |
| Liberal | I. Garrard | 356 | 8.0 | +8.0 |
| National Front | M. R. Goucher | 149 | 3.4 | +3.4 |
| Majority | | 1,082 | 24.4 | +23.1 |
| Turnout | | 4,427 | | |
| Conservative gain from Labour | | Swing | +12.9 | |

=== Newton Heath ===
Newton Heath
| Party | Candidate | Votes | % | ±% |
|---|---|---|---|---|
| Labour | J. Smith* | 1,449 | 53.9 | −8.6 |
| Conservative | A. Bonson | 1,240 | 46.1 | +8.6 |
| Majority | | 209 | 7.8 | −17.2 |
| Turnout | | 2,689 | | |
| Labour hold | | Swing | -8.6 | |

=== Northenden ===
Northenden
| Party | Candidate | Votes | % | ±% |
|---|---|---|---|---|
| Conservative | D. Mountford* | 2,715 | 53.3 | −0.2 |
| Labour | D. Healey | 1,886 | 37.0 | −3.3 |
| Liberal | H. Hilton | 490 | 9.6 | +9.6 |
| Majority | | 829 | 16.3 | +3.1 |
| Turnout | | 5,091 | | |
| Conservative hold | | Swing | +1.5 | |

=== Old Moat ===
Old Moat
| Party | Candidate | Votes | % | ±% |
|---|---|---|---|---|
| Conservative | T. E. Murphy* | 2,232 | 57.6 | −6.3 |
| Labour | P. Bednarski | 1,106 | 28.6 | −7.4 |
| Liberal | A. A. Parr | 534 | 13.8 | +13.8 |
| Majority | | 1,126 | 29.1 | +1.1 |
| Turnout | | 3,872 | | |
| Conservative hold | | Swing | +0.5 | |

=== Rusholme ===
Rusholme
| Party | Candidate | Votes | % | ±% |
|---|---|---|---|---|
| Conservative | S. Tucker* | 2,196 | 64.8 | +5.0 |
| Labour | P. J. Rowbotham | 785 | 23.2 | −6.8 |
| Liberal | F. A. Melling | 408 | 12.0 | +12.0 |
| Majority | | 1,411 | 41.6 | +11.8 |
| Turnout | | 3,389 | | |
| Conservative hold | | Swing | +5.9 | |

=== Withington ===
Withington
| Party | Candidate | Votes | % | ±% |
|---|---|---|---|---|
| Conservative | W. Crabtree* | 2,162 | 49.3 | +1.2 |
| Liberal | J. Edwards | 1,311 | 29.9 | +0.2 |
| Labour | C. Scott | 911 | 20.8 | −1.4 |
| Majority | | 851 | 19.4 | +1.0 |
| Turnout | | 4,384 | | |
| Conservative hold | | Swing | +0.5 | |

=== Woodhouse Park ===
Woodhouse Park
| Party | Candidate | Votes | % | ±% |
|---|---|---|---|---|
| Labour | G. Berry* | 1,914 | 58.5 | −3.3 |
| Conservative | A. Farmer | 1,356 | 41.5 | +10.7 |
| Majority | | 558 | 17.0 | −14.0 |
| Turnout | | 3,270 | | |
| Labour hold | | Swing | -7.0 | |
