= 1976 Manchester City Council election =

1976 UK local government election

- 6 May 1976

33 of 99 seats to Manchester City Council 50 seats needed for a majority
	First party	Second party
Leader	Norman Morris	Robert Rodgers
Party	Labour	Conservative
Leader's seat	Charlestown	Alexandra
Last election	15 seats, 38.8%	19 seats, 50.1%
Seats before	54	45
Seats won	19	14
Seats after	54	45
Seat change	Steady	Steady
Popular vote	60,027	63,393
Percentage	45.1%	47.6%
Swing	▲6.3%	▼2.5%
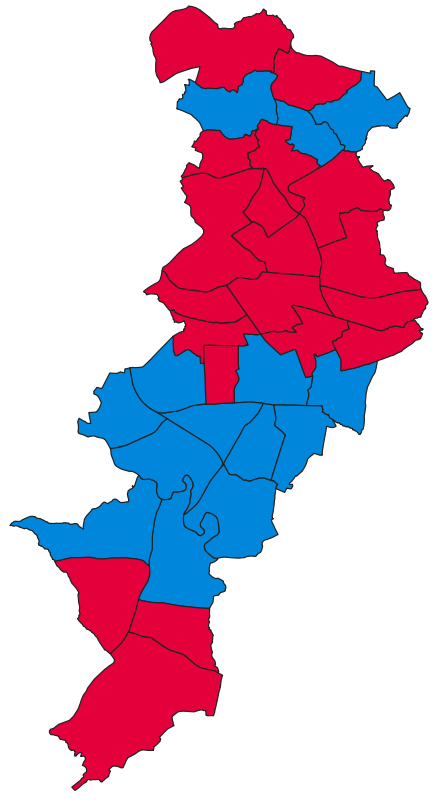
- Map of results of 1976 election
Leader of the Council before election
Norman Morris
Labour
Leader of the Council after election
Norman Morris
Labour

Elections to Manchester City Council were held on Thursday, 6 May 1976. One third of the council was up for election, with each successful candidate to serve a four-year term of office, expiring in 1980. The Labour Party retained overall control of the Council.

== Election result ==
Party	Votes		Seats			Full Council	
Labour Party	60,027 (45.1%)	▲6.3	19 (57.6%)	19 / 33	Steady	54 (54.4%)	54 / 99
Conservative Party	63,393 (47.6%)	▼2.5	14 (42.4%)	14 / 33	Steady	45 (45.5%)	45 / 99
Liberal Party	8,367 (6.3%)	▼3.0	0 (0.0%)	0 / 33	Steady	0 (0.0%)	0 / 99
Independent	1,047 (0.8%)	▲0.3	0 (0.0%)	0 / 33	Steady	0 (0.0%)	0 / 99
Communist	167 (0.1%)	▼0.1	0 (0.0%)	0 / 33	Steady	0 (0.0%)	0 / 99

↓
54	45

== Ward results ==
=== Alexandra ===
Alexandra
Party	Candidate	Votes	%	±%
Conservative	N. Thompson*	3,230	61.3	−0.2
Liberal	D. Hewitt	1,012	19.2	−1.9
Labour	A. G. Mackie	963	18.3	+0.8
Independent	S. Martyniuk	61	1.2	+1.2
Majority		2,218	42.1	+1.7
Turnout		5,266		
Conservative hold		Swing	+0.8	

=== Ardwick ===
Ardwick
Party	Candidate	Votes	%	±%
Labour	F. Dale*	1,752	68.9	+1.1
Conservative	M. W. Coales	792	31.1	−1.1
Majority		960	37.8	+2.2
Turnout		2,544		
Labour hold		Swing	+1.1	

=== Baguley ===
Baguley
Party	Candidate	Votes	%	±%
Labour	A. Burns	3,296	52.8	+6.7
Conservative	J. V. Oatway*	2,693	43.1	−10.8
Liberal	M. Quinn	257	4.1	+4.1
Majority		603	9.7	+6.3
Turnout		6,246		
Labour gain from Conservative		Swing	+8.7	

=== Barlow Moor ===
Barlow Moor
Party	Candidate	Votes	%	±%
Conservative	B. Moore*	2,191	56.2	−8.2
Labour	P. Karney	1,404	36.0	+0.4
Liberal	G. Irvine	301	7.7	+7.7
Majority		787	20.2	−8.7
Turnout		3,896		
Conservative hold		Swing	-4.3	

=== Beswick ===
Beswick
Party	Candidate	Votes	%	±%
Labour	J. Flanagan	1,760	75.4	−3.6
Conservative	J. Cartland	449	19.2	−1.8
Liberal	P. Coleman	125	5.4	+5.4
Majority		1,311	56.2	−1.8
Turnout		2,334		
Labour hold		Swing	-1.8	

=== Blackley ===
Blackley
Party	Candidate	Votes	%	±%
Labour	W. Risby*	2,482	54.3	+8.0
Conservative	J. Yates	2,092	45.7	−8.0
Majority		390	8.5	+1.1
Turnout		4,574		
Labour hold		Swing	+8.0	

=== Bradford ===
Bradford
Party	Candidate	Votes	%	±%
Labour	Bill Egerton*	2,376	53.6	+4.9
Conservative	C. R. Ashton	1,906	43.0	−3.4
Liberal	M. W. Powell	99	2.2	+2.2
Independent	J. Hulse	53	1.2	−1.1
Majority		470	10.6	+8.3
Turnout		4,434		
Labour hold		Swing	+4.1	

=== Brooklands ===
Brooklands
Party	Candidate	Votes	%	±%
Conservative	G. W. G. Fitzsimons*	2,795	49.5	−11.2
Labour	J. Wilner	2,538	45.0	+5.7
Liberal	G. F. Turner	309	5.5	+5.5
Majority		257	4.6	−16.7
Turnout		5,642		
Conservative hold		Swing	-8.4	

=== Burnage ===
Burnage
Party	Candidate	Votes	%	±%
Conservative	W. L. Lund*	2,966	59.5	+8.1
Labour	G. Stringer	1,609	32.3	−0.1
Liberal	G. Shaw	411	8.2	+10.7
Majority		1,357	27.2	+8.3
Turnout		4,986		
Conservative hold		Swing	+4.1	

=== Charlestown ===
Charlestown
Party	Candidate	Votes	%	±%
Labour	N. Morris*	2,458	51.7	+4.1
Conservative	W. Guy	2,006	42.2	−10.2
Liberal	J. Laslett	289	6.1	+6.1
Majority		452	9.5	+4.6
Turnout		4,753		
Labour hold		Swing	+7.1	

=== Cheetham ===
Cheetham
Party	Candidate	Votes	%	±%
Labour	D. G. Ford*	1,421	62.5	+0.3
Conservative	A. Goulding	852	37.5	−0.3
Majority		569	25.0	+0.6
Turnout		2,273		
Labour hold		Swing	+0.3	

=== Chorlton ===
Chorlton
Party	Candidate	Votes	%	±%
Conservative	M. Vince*	3,030	64.9	+2.8
Labour	A. J. Bateman	1,164	24.9	+4.7
Liberal	H. Wallace	478	10.2	−5.2
Majority		1,866	39.9	−2.0
Turnout		4,672		
Conservative hold		Swing	-0.9	

=== Collegiate Church ===
Collegiate Church
Party	Candidate	Votes	%	±%
Labour	S. Ogden*	628	63.9	+4.1
Conservative	D. H. Philip	261	26.6	−0.9
Liberal	K. D. Underhill	78	7.9	−4.7
Independent	P. Wragg	16	1.6	+1.6
Majority		367	37.3	+5.0
Turnout		983		
Labour hold		Swing	+2.5	

=== Crossacres ===
Crossacres
Party	Candidate	Votes	%	±%
Labour	A. Roberts*	3,257	59.6	+13.1
Conservative	K. A. Edis	1,576	28.8	+7.3
Liberal	H. Griffiths	633	11.6	−2.3
Majority		1,681	30.8	+5.8
Turnout		5,466		
Labour hold		Swing	+2.9	

=== Crumpsall ===
Crumpsall
Party	Candidate	Votes	%	±%
Conservative	W. L. Clapham	2,528	57.5	−2.8
Labour	P. A. Murphy	1,474	33.5	+5.1
Liberal	A. E. Griffiths	396	9.0	−2.3
Majority		1,054	24.0	−7.9
Turnout		4,398		
Conservative hold		Swing	-3.9	

=== Didsbury ===
Didsbury
Party	Candidate	Votes	%	±%
Conservative	J. Duke*	3,904	65.1	−0.7
Labour	C. B. Muir	1,185	19.8	+5.3
Liberal	T. Kellgren	839	14.0	−4.0
Independent	K. V. M. Brown	72	1.2	+1.2
Majority		2,719	45.3	+7.2
Turnout		6,000		
Conservative hold		Swing	-3.0	

=== Gorton North ===
Gorton North
Party	Candidate	Votes	%	±%
Labour	C. Brierley*	1,989	59.4	+4.5
Conservative	E. Leadbetter	1,241	37.0	−8.1
Liberal	D. Sandiford	121	3.6	+3.6
Majority		748	22.3	+12.4
Turnout		3,351		
Labour hold		Swing	+6.3	

=== Gorton South ===
Gorton South
Party	Candidate	Votes	%	±%
Labour	D. Barker*	1,598	56.8	+0.7
Conservative	D. Heywood	1,217	43.2	−0.7
Majority		381	13.6	+1.4
Turnout		2,815		
Labour hold		Swing	+0.7	

=== Harpurhey ===
Harpurhey
Party	Candidate	Votes	%	±%
Labour	H. Reid*	1,131	58.6	+10.8
Conservative	D. Porter	706	36.6	−2.1
Liberal	P. Hannon	92	4.8	−8.7
Majority		425	22.0	+12.9
Turnout		1,929		
Labour hold		Swing	+6.4	

=== Hulme ===
Hulme
Party	Candidate	Votes	%	±%
Labour	T. Thomas*	1,514	67.1	−0.8
Conservative	L. Gaffney	419	18.6	−0.9
Liberal	M. Moonsamy	325	14.4	+4.0
Majority		1,095	48.5	+0.1
Turnout		2,258		
Labour hold		Swing	+0.0	

=== Levenshulme ===
Levenshulme
Party	Candidate	Votes	%	±%
Conservative	W. Carlton*	2,506	51.6	−4.7
Labour	P. Hildrew	1,856	38.2	+4.7
Liberal	K. Whitmore	408	8.4	−1.8
Independent	P. J. Cassidy	86	1.8	+1.8
Majority		650	13.4	−9.4
Turnout		4,856		
Conservative hold		Swing	-4.7	

=== Lightbowne ===
Lightbowne
Party	Candidate	Votes	%	±%
Conservative	G. Cleworth	2,308	52.7	+14.3
Labour	R. A. Reddington*	2,068	47.3	+13.6
Majority		240	5.5	+0.8
Turnout		4,376		
Conservative gain from Labour		Swing	+0.3	

=== Lloyd Street ===
Lloyd Street
Party	Candidate	Votes	%	±%
Labour	K. McKeon*	2,402	50.6	+4.6
Conservative	A. Nixon	2,088	44.0	+1.5
Liberal	R. Coleman	204	4.3	−7.2
Independent	D. E. Carter	50	1.1	+1.1
Majority		314	6.6	+3.0
Turnout		4,744		
Labour hold		Swing	+1.5	

=== Longsight ===
Longsight
Party	Candidate	Votes	%	±%
Labour	R. W. Ford*	1,998	51.8	+6.8
Conservative	M. Delayen	1,862	48.2	−6.8
Majority		136	3.5	−6.5
Turnout		3,860		
Labour hold		Swing	+6.8	

=== Miles Platting ===
Miles Platting
Party	Candidate	Votes	%	±%
Labour	R. Latham*	1,715	79.3	+7.0
Conservative	A. E. Halliday	448	20.7	−7.0
Majority		1,267	58.6	+13.9
Turnout		2,163		
Labour hold		Swing	+7.0	

=== Moss Side ===
Moss Side
Party	Candidate	Votes	%	±%
Labour	H. Paget*	980	52.8	+13.0
Independent	E. W. Smyth	480	25.8	+25.8
Conservative	P. Hilton	397	21.4	−2.0
Majority		500	26.9	+23.8
Turnout		1,857		
Labour hold		Swing	-6.4	

=== Moston ===
Moston
Party	Candidate	Votes	%	±%
Conservative	K. E. Goulding*	3,144	61.9	+5.4
Labour	J. A. Dean	1,935	38.1	+6.0
Majority		1,209	23.8	−0.6
Turnout		5,079		
Conservative hold		Swing	-0.3	

=== Newton Heath ===
Newton Heath
Party	Candidate	Votes	%	±%
Labour	C. Tomlinson*	1,819	49.0	−4.9
Conservative	L. Clarke	1,794	48.3	+2.2
Liberal	R. Cowe	101	2.7	+2.7
Majority		25	0.7	−7.1
Turnout		3,714		
Labour hold		Swing	-3.5	

=== Northenden ===
Northenden
Party	Candidate	Votes	%	±%
Conservative	C. H. Box*	2,923	51.5	−1.8
Labour	H. Brown	2,359	41.6	+4.6
Liberal	H. Hilton	307	5.4	−4.2
Communist	M. Taylor	82	1.4	+1.4
Majority		564	9.9	−6.4
Turnout		5,671		
Conservative hold		Swing	-3.2	

=== Old Moat ===
Old Moat
Party	Candidate	Votes	%	±%
Conservative	W. H. Aikman	2,346	52.6	−5.0
Labour	A. H. Fender	1,664	37.3	+8.7
Liberal	A. A. Parr	316	7.1	−6.7
Communist	D. J. Granfield	85	1.9	+1.9
Independent	P. S. Pinder	52	1.2	+1.2
Majority		682	15.3	−13.8
Turnout		4,463		
Conservative hold		Swing	-6.8	

=== Rusholme ===
Rusholme
Party	Candidate	Votes	%	±%
Conservative	K. Ollerenshaw*	2,580	64.2	−0.6
Labour	W. J. Courtney	1,308	32.6	+9.4
Independent	C. R. Sedman	130	3.2	+3.2
Majority		1,272	31.7	−9.9
Turnout		4,018		
Conservative hold		Swing	-5.0	

=== Withington ===
Withington
Party	Candidate	Votes	%	±%
Conservative	G. W. Young*	2,657	55.0	+5.7
Labour	D. Healey	1,226	25.4	+4.6
Liberal	J. Edwards	905	18.7	−11.2
Independent	E. N. Goodyear	47	1.0	+1.0
Majority		1,431	29.6	+10.2
Turnout		4,835		
Conservative hold		Swing	+0.5	

=== Woodhouse Park ===
Woodhouse Park
Party	Candidate	Votes	%	±%
Labour	T. Farrell*	2,698	59.4	+0.9
Conservative	A. Farmer	1,486	32.7	−8.8
Liberal	L. Griffiths	361	7.9	+7.9
Majority		1,212	26.7	+9.6
Turnout		4,545		
Labour hold		Swing	+4.8	
