= 1972 Manchester City Council election =

UK local government election

- 4 May 1972

33 of 132 seats to Manchester City Council 67 seats needed for a majority
	First party	Second party
Party	Labour	Conservative
Last election	81 seats, 60.2%	18 seats, 35.6%
Seats before	108	24
Seats won	20	13
Seats after	101	31
Seat change	▼7	▲7
Popular vote	64,692	55,615
Percentage	51.8%	44.6%
Swing	▼8.4%	▲9.0%
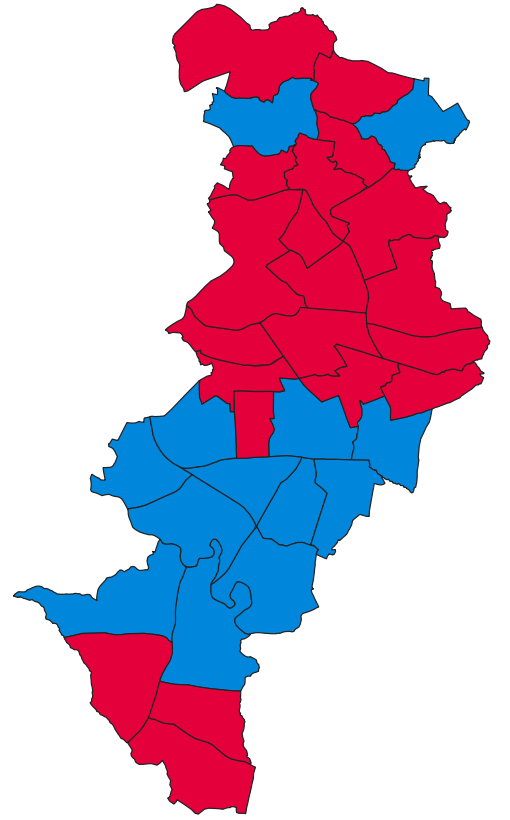
- Map of results of 1972 election
Leader of the Council before election
Labour
Leader of the Council after election
Labour

Elections to Manchester City Council were held on Thursday, 4 May 1972. One third of the councillors were up for election, with each successful candidate to serve a two-year term of office. These were the final elections held in Manchester before the Local Government Act 1972 abolished the city corporation and reformed it as a metropolitan borough. The Labour Party retained overall control of the council.

== Election result ==
Party	Votes		Seats			Full Council	
Labour Party	64,692 (51.8%)	▼8.4	20 (60.6%)	20 / 33	▼7	101 (76.5%)	101 / 132
Conservative Party	55,615 (44.6%)	▲9.0	13 (39.4%)	13 / 33	▲7	31 (23.5%)	31 / 132
Liberal Party	3,423 (2.7%)	▲0.2	0 (0.0%)	0 / 33	Steady	0 (0.0%)	0 / 132
Communist	683 (0.5%)	▼0.9	0 (0.0%)	0 / 33	Steady	0 (0.0%)	0 / 132
Independent	240 (0.2%)	▲0.1	0 (0.0%)	0 / 33	Steady	0 (0.0%)	0 / 132
Residents	135 (0.1%)	Steady	0 (0.0%)	0 / 33	Steady	0 (0.0%)	0 / 132

=== Full council ===
↓
101	31

=== Aldermen ===
↓
27	6

=== Councillors ===
↓
74	25

== Ward results ==
=== Alexandra ===
Alexandra
Party	Candidate	Votes	%	±%
Conservative	J. B. Chapman*	3,120	71.3	+8.8
Labour	A. S. Wood	1,258	28.7	+2.2
Majority		1,862	42.6	+9.2
Turnout		4,378		
Conservative hold		Swing		

=== Ardwick ===
Ardwick
Party	Candidate	Votes	%	±%
Labour	H. Barrett*	2,097	78.2	−3.7
Conservative	G. Taylor	484	18.1	−1.1
Communist	R. Hughes	100	3.7	−3.5
Majority		1,613	60.1	+3.6
Turnout		2,681		
Labour hold		Swing		

=== Baguley ===
Baguley
Party	Candidate	Votes	%	±%
Labour	H. Brown*	2,814	56.4	−11.5
Conservative	M. Malbon	2,171	43.6	+7.4
Majority		643	12.8	−11.7
Turnout		4,985		
Labour hold		Swing		

=== Barlow Moor ===
Barlow Moor
Party	Candidate	Votes	%	±%
Conservative	H. Tucker	1,915	49.5	+7.9
Labour	W. A. Moody*	1,460	37.8	−7.0
Liberal	D. R. Mellor	490	12.7	−4.1
Majority		455	11.8	
Turnout		3,865		
Conservative gain from Labour		Swing		

=== Beswick ===
Beswick
Party	Candidate	Votes	%	±%
Labour	S. Corless*	2,005	89.5	−0.3
Conservative	D. Eastwood	236	10.5	−9.6
Majority		1,769	79.0	+20.7
Turnout		2,241		
Labour hold		Swing		

=== Blackley ===
Blackley
Party	Candidate	Votes	%	±%
Labour	J. I. Owen*	2,129	60.0	−8.1
Conservative	D. F. Silverman	1,417	40.0	+6.2
Majority		712	20.0	−11.9
Turnout		3,546		
Labour hold		Swing		

=== Bradford ===
Bradford
Party	Candidate	Votes	%	±%
Labour	W. Egerton*	2,784	64.1	−14.1
Conservative	D. Lear	1,559	35.9	+9.6
Majority		1,225	28.2	−17.7
Turnout		4,343		
Labour hold		Swing		

=== Brooklands ===
Brooklands
Party	Candidate	Votes	%	±%
Conservative	Y. I. Emery	2,803	52.4	+12.3
Labour	E. Mellor*	2,551	47.6	−13.5
Majority		252	4.8	
Turnout		5,354		
Conservative gain from Labour		Swing		

=== Burnage ===
Burnage
Party	Candidate	Votes	%	±%
Conservative	W. L. Lund*	2,746	63.4	+9.9
Labour	B. W. McColgan	1,583	36.6	−10.5
Majority		1,163	26.8	+21.2
Turnout		4,329		
Conservative hold		Swing		

=== Charlestown ===
Charlestown
Party	Candidate	Votes	%	±%
Labour	S. C. Silverman*	2,067	58.1	−5.9
Conservative	D. F. Silverman	1,420	39.9	+7.4
Communist	R. L. Cole	72	2.0	−1.5
Majority		647	18.2	−9.7
Turnout		3,559		
Labour hold		Swing		

=== Cheetham ===
Cheetham
Party	Candidate	Votes	%	±%
Labour	J. Broderick*	1,297	64.5	−9.1
Conservative	F. E. Meaden	714	35.5	+8.1
Majority		583	29.0	−14.3
Turnout		2,011		
Labour hold		Swing		

=== Chorlton ===
Chorlton
Party	Candidate	Votes	%	±%
Conservative	M. Delavan*	2,970	69.0	+11.1
Labour	H. M. Gregory	1,336	31.0	−10.5
Majority		1,634	38.0	+24.5
Turnout		4,306		
Conservative hold		Swing		

=== Collegiate Church ===
Collegiate Church
Party	Candidate	Votes	%	±%
Labour	F. J. Balcombe*	843	84.6	+0.4
Conservative	P. A. Bradshaw	153	15.4	−0.6
Majority		690	69.2	+2.0
Turnout		996		
Labour hold		Swing		

=== Crossacres ===
Crossacres
Party	Candidate	Votes	%	±%
Labour	A. Roberts*	3,200	68.4	−8.9
Conservative	J. Jones	1,353	28.9	+0.3
Communist	M. E. Taylor	126	2.7	−1.6
Majority		1,847	39.5	−3.0
Turnout		4,679		
Labour hold		Swing		

=== Crumpsall ===
Crumpsall
Party	Candidate	Votes	%	±%
Conservative	F. R. Butler	2,451	59.4	+13.6
Labour	H. Brooks*	1,676	40.6	−10.4
Majority		775	18.8	
Turnout		4,127		
Conservative gain from Labour		Swing		

=== Didsbury ===
Didsbury
Party	Candidate	Votes	%	±%
Conservative	J. Duke*	3,752	74.4	+8.7
Labour	M. Pickstone	1,294	25.6	−8.8
Majority		2,458	48.8	+18.2
Turnout		5,046		
Conservative hold		Swing		

=== Gorton North ===
Gorton North
Party	Candidate	Votes	%	±%
Labour	G. Conquest*	2,738	70.6	−8.9
Conservative	J. A. Davenport	1,052	27.1	+4.3
Communist	A. Prior	87	2.2	−3.3
Majority		1,686	43.5	−8.9
Turnout		3,877		
Labour hold		Swing		

=== Gorton South ===
Gorton South
Party	Candidate	Votes	%	±%
Labour	K. Franklin*	2,022	71.8	+2.0
Conservative	L. H. Nield	793	28.2	−16.5
Majority		1,229	43.6	+24.5
Turnout		2,815		
Labour hold		Swing		

=== Harpurhey ===
Harpurhey
Party	Candidate	Votes	%	±%
Labour	S. N. M. Moxley*	1,412	62.1	−8.8
Conservative	A. P. Osborn	860	37.9	+7.2
Majority		552	24.2	−13.0
Turnout		2,272		
Labour hold		Swing		

=== Hulme ===
Hulme
Party	Candidate	Votes	%	±%
Labour	A. P. Marino*	2,101	89.1	+4.2
Conservative	R. J. R. Lomas	258	10.9	−3.0
Majority		1,843	78.2	+8.7
Turnout		2,359		
Labour hold		Swing		

=== Levenshulme ===
Levenshulme
Party	Candidate	Votes	%	±%
Conservative	J. K. Barber	2,531	54.3	+10.0
Labour	A. E. Jones*	2,132	45.7	−9.9
Majority		399	8.6	
Turnout		4,663		
Conservative gain from Labour		Swing		

=== Lightbowne ===
Lightbowne
Party	Candidate	Votes	%	±%
Labour	R. A. Reddington*	1,877	38.8	−19.0
Conservative	N. A. Green	1,868	38.6	+7.3
Liberal	J. Lindsay	1,098	22.6	+8.2
Majority		9	0.2	−24.9
Turnout		4,843		
Labour hold		Swing		

=== Lloyd Street ===
Lloyd Street
Party	Candidate	Votes	%	±%
Labour	K. McKeon*	2,423	54.6	−8.4
Conservative	S. D. Alexander	2,011	45.4	+6.1
Majority		412	9.2	−9.8
Turnout		4,434		
Labour hold		Swing		

=== Longsight ===
Longsight
Party	Candidate	Votes	%	±%
Labour	M. A. Naqui*	2,185	54.4	−5.2
Conservative	A. Malpas	1,634	40.7	+4.2
Residents	H. J. Barton	135	3.4	N/A
Communist	H. Johnson	59	1.5	−1.6
Majority		551	13.7	−5.7
Turnout		4,013		
Labour hold		Swing		

=== Miles Platting ===
Miles Platting
Party	Candidate	Votes	%	±%
Labour	R. Latham*	1,829	85.7	−4.9
Conservative	D. Porter	305	14.3	+4.6
Majority		1,524	71.4	−5.8
Turnout		2,134		
Labour hold		Swing		

=== Moss Side ===
Moss Side
Party	Candidate	Votes	%	±%
Labour	R. E. Talbot*	1,791	75.0	+4.1
Conservative	E. M. Bevan	596	25.0	−6.7
Majority		1,195	50.0	+12.8
Turnout		2,387		
Labour hold		Swing		

=== Moston ===
Moston
Party	Candidate	Votes	%	±%
Conservative	K. E. Goulding	2,007	43.9	+6.7
Labour	W. Lister*	1,848	40.4	−22.4
Liberal	G. Garrard	661	14.5	+8.9
Communist	A. Clark	57	1.2	−1.4
Majority		159	3.5	
Turnout		4,573		
Conservative gain from Labour		Swing		

=== Newton Heath ===
Newton Heath
Party	Candidate	Votes	%	±%
Labour	J. Smith*	2,234	62.6	−13.5
Conservative	A. E. Walsh	1,337	37.4	+10.9
Majority		897	25.2	−17.4
Turnout		3,571		
Labour hold		Swing		

=== Northenden ===
Northenden
Party	Candidate	Votes	%	±%
Conservative	G. Leigh	2,996	51.6	+4.9
Labour	G. Berry*	2,678	46.1	−7.1
Independent	A. I. A. McLean	131	2.3	N/A
Majority		318	5.5	
Turnout		5,805		
Conservative gain from Labour		Swing		

=== Old Moat ===
Old Moat
Party	Candidate	Votes	%	±%
Conservative	T. F. Lavin*	2,371	55.1	+6.5
Labour	K. J. Hill	1,930	44.9	−5.5
Majority		441	10.2	+10.2
Turnout		4,301		
Conservative hold		Swing		

=== Rusholme ===
Rusholme
Party	Candidate	Votes	%	±%
Conservative	T. E. Phillips	2,371	61.0	+12.0
Labour	L. J. Lamb*	1,317	33.9	−13.4
Independent	A. Melling	109	2.8	N/A
Communist	G. H. Mills	93	2.3	−5.4
Majority		1,054	27.1	
Turnout		3,890		
Conservative gain from Labour		Swing		

=== Withington ===
Withington
Party	Candidate	Votes	%	±%
Conservative	G. W. Young*	2,254	48.3	+0.9
Labour	C. A. Hassall	1,238	26.5	−8.2
Liberal	J. L. Edwards	1,174	25.2	+0.9
Majority		357	7.8	+0.9
Turnout		4,666		
Conservative hold		Swing		

=== Woodhouse Park ===
Woodhouse Park
Party	Candidate	Votes	%	±%
Labour	G. Hall*	2,543	68.0	−13.2
Conservative	G. Parry	1,107	29.6	+11.4
Communist	J. V. Hamer	89	2.4	−1.2
Majority		1,436	38.4	−17.1
Turnout		3,739		
Labour hold		Swing		

== Aldermanic elections ==
=== Aldermanic election, 3 January 1973 ===
Caused by the death on 30 November 1972 of Alderman Stanley Jolly (Labour, elected as an alderman by the council on 17 February 1965).

In his place, Councillor Norman Thompson (Conservative, Alexandra, elected 9 May 1957) was elected as an alderman by the council on 3 January 1973.

Party	Alderman	Ward	Term expires
Conservative	Norman Thompson	Levenshulme	1974
