= 1978 Manchester City Council election =

1978 UK local government election

- 4 May 1978

33 of 99 seats to Manchester City Council 50 seats needed for a majority
	First party	Second party
Leader	Norman Morris	Kathleen Ollerenshaw
Party	Labour	Conservative
Leader's seat	Charlestown	Rusholme
Last election	19 seats, 45.1%	14 seats, 47.6%
Seats before	54	45
Seats won	19	14
Seats after	53	46
Seat change	▼1	▲1
Popular vote	61,969	58,717
Percentage	47.8%	45.3%
Swing	▲2.7%	▼2.3%
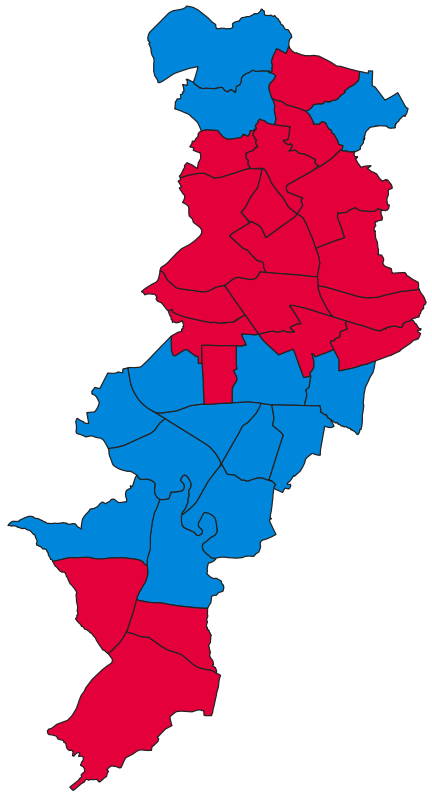
- Map of results of 1978 election
Leader of the Council before election
Norman Morris
Labour
Leader of the Council after election
Norman Morris
Labour

Elections to Manchester City Council were held on Thursday, 4 May 1978. One third of the council was up for election, with each successful candidate to serve a four-year term of office, expiring in 1982. The Labour Party retained overall control of the council.

== Election result ==
Party	Votes		Seats			Full Council	
Labour Party	61,969 (47.8%)	▲2.7	19 (57.6%)	19 / 33	▼1	53 (53.4%)	53 / 99
Conservative Party	58,717 (45.3%)	▼2.3	14 (42.4%)	14 / 33	▲1	46 (46.5%)	46 / 99
Liberal Party	7,708 (5.9%)	▼0.4	0 (0.0%)	0 / 33	Steady	0 (0.0%)	0 / 99
National Front	636 (0.5%)	N/A	0 (0.0%)	0 / 33	N/A	0 (0.0%)	0 / 99
Communist	277 (0.2%)	▲0.1	0 (0.0%)	0 / 33	Steady	0 (0.0%)	0 / 99
Socialist Unity	139 (0.1%)	N/A	0 (0.0%)	0 / 33	N/A	0 (0.0%)	0 / 99
Workers Revolutionary	34 (0.0%)	N/A	0 (0.0%)	0 / 33	N/A	0 (0.0%)	0 / 99

↓
53	46

== Ward results ==
=== Alexandra ===
Alexandra
Party	Candidate	Votes	%	±%
Conservative	M. Flynn*	2,895	59.9	−1.4
Labour	G. M. Gorton	1,249	25.8	+7.5
Liberal	D. Hewitt	689	14.3	−4.9
Majority		1,646	34.1	−8.0
Turnout		4,833	37.6	
Conservative hold		Swing		

=== Ardwick ===
Ardwick
Party	Candidate	Votes	%	±%
Labour	H. Barrett*	2,102	70.5	+1.6
Conservative	W. R. Swan	783	26.3	−4.8
Liberal	D. Nicholson	96	3.2	+3.2
Majority		1,319	44.2	+6.5
Turnout		2,981	27.7	
Labour hold		Swing	+3.2	

=== Baguley ===
Baguley
Party	Candidate	Votes	%	±%
Labour	F. Done	3,536	56.4	+3.6
Conservative	P. Fitzsimons	2,737	43.6	+0.5
Majority		799	12.8	+3.1
Turnout		6,273	46.1	
Labour hold		Swing	+1.5	

=== Barlow Moor ===
Barlow Moor
Party	Candidate	Votes	%	±%
Conservative	H. Tucker*	2,136	63.9	+7.7
Labour	A. Manning	1,208	36.1	+0.1
Majority		928	27.8	+7.6
Turnout		3,344	32.4	
Conservative hold		Swing	+3.8	

=== Beswick ===
Beswick
Party	Candidate	Votes	%	±%
Labour	S. Silverman	1,746	77.3	+1.9
Conservative	J. Cartland	370	16.4	−2.8
National Front	A. Tatton	81	3.6	+3.6
Liberal	J. Thomson	63	2.8	−2.6
Majority		1,376	60.9	+4.7
Turnout		2,260	27.7	
Labour hold		Swing	+2.3	

=== Blackley ===
Blackley
Party	Candidate	Votes	%	±%
Conservative	P. Loxley	2,508	52.2	+6.5
Labour	J. I. Owen*	2,143	44.6	−9.7
Liberal	V. Towers	153	3.2	+3.2
Majority		365	7.6	−0.9
Turnout		4,804	43.2	
Conservative gain from Labour		Swing	+8.1	

=== Bradford ===
Bradford
Party	Candidate	Votes	%	±%
Labour	J. Gilmore*	2,398	58.8	+5.2
Conservative	L. Hockey	1,490	36.6	−6.4
National Front	J. Hulse	139	3.4	+3.4
Communist	M. Murray	49	1.2	+1.2
Majority		908	22.3	+11.7
Turnout		4,076	33.3	
Labour hold		Swing	+5.8	

=== Brooklands ===
Brooklands
Party	Candidate	Votes	%	±%
Conservative	Y. Emery*	3,027	56.8	+7.3
Labour	J. Wilner	2,298	43.2	−1.8
Majority		729	13.6	+9.1
Turnout		5,325	40.8	
Conservative hold		Swing	+4.5	

=== Burnage ===
Burnage
Party	Candidate	Votes	%	±%
Conservative	L. Howarth*	2,647	60.6	+1.1
Labour	K. Robinson	1,724	39.4	+7.1
Majority		950	21.7	−5.5
Turnout		4,371	37.6	
Conservative hold		Swing	-3.0	

=== Charlestown ===
Charlestown
Party	Candidate	Votes	%	±%
Labour	L. Kelly*	2,146	48.4	−3.3
Conservative	C. Maffei	2,002	45.2	+3.0
Liberal	N. Towers	155	3.5	−2.6
National Front	W. E. Caffrey	91	2.1	+2.1
Communist	S. Cole	40	0.9	+0.9
Majority		144	3.2	−6.3
Turnout		4,434	44.5	
Labour hold		Swing	-3.1	

=== Cheetham ===
Cheetham
Party	Candidate	Votes	%	±%
Labour	J. Broderick*	1,482	66.6	+4.1
Conservative	F. Meaden	743	33.4	−4.1
Majority		739	33.2	+8.2
Turnout		2,225	28.5	
Labour hold		Swing	+4.1	

=== Chorlton ===
Chorlton
Party	Candidate	Votes	%	±%
Conservative	L. Sanders*	2,769	62.0	−2.9
Labour	K. Cropper	1,387	31.1	+6.2
Liberal	J. Commons	308	6.9	−3.3
Majority		1,382	31.0	−8.9
Turnout		4,464	38.4	
Conservative hold		Swing	-4.5	

=== Collegiate Church ===
Collegiate Church
Party	Candidate	Votes	%	±%
Labour	F. Balcombe*	843	63.1	−0.8
Conservative	S. R. Newth	416	31.1	+4.5
Liberal	M. A. Plesch	78	5.8	−2.1
Majority		427	32.0	−5.3
Turnout		1,337	28.2	
Labour hold		Swing	-2.6	

=== Crossacres ===
Crossacres
Party	Candidate	Votes	%	±%
Labour	R. L. Griffiths*	2,877	59.5	−0.1
Conservative	A. Spencer	1,418	29.3	+0.5
Liberal	H. Griffiths	537	11.1	−0.5
Majority		1,459	30.2	−0.6
Turnout		4,832	35.3	
Labour hold		Swing	-0.3	

=== Crumpsall ===
Crumpsall
Party	Candidate	Votes	%	±%
Conservative	G. Fildes*	2,183	53.9	−3.6
Labour	G. Stringer	1,517	37.5	+4.0
Liberal	J. Cookson	286	7.1	−1.9
Communist	S. Ward	61	1.5	+1.5
Majority		666	16.5	−7.5
Turnout		4,047	35.3	
Conservative hold		Swing	-3.8	

=== Didsbury ===
Didsbury
Party	Candidate	Votes	%	±%
Conservative	J. Hill*	3,902	68.0	+2.9
Labour	E. Newman	1,304	22.7	+2.9
Liberal	J. T. Mitchell	534	9.3	−4.7
Majority		2,598	45.3	−0.0
Turnout		5,740	44.5	
Conservative hold		Swing	-2.9	

=== Gorton North ===
Gorton North
Party	Candidate	Votes	%	±%
Labour	T. O. Hamnett*	1,856	56.7	−2.7
Conservative	E. Leadbetter	1,184	36.2	−0.8
Liberal	J. M. Ashley	231	7.1	+3.5
Majority		672	20.5	−1.8
Turnout		3,271	37.7	
Labour hold		Swing	-0.9	

=== Gorton South ===
Gorton South
Party	Candidate	Votes	%	±%
Labour	H. Conway*	1,619	55.4	−1.4
Conservative	D. Heywood	1,174	40.2	−3.0
National Front	N. J. Mead	97	3.3	+3.3
Workers Revolutionary	A. Willams	34	1.2	+1.2
Majority		445	15.2	+1.7
Turnout		2,924	33.8	
Labour hold		Swing	+0.8	

=== Harpurhey ===
Harpurhey
Party	Candidate	Votes	%	±%
Labour	K. Litherland*	1,341	62.5	+3.9
Conservative	J. Harding	804	37.5	+0.9
Majority		537	25.0	+3.0
Turnout		2,145	30.9	
Labour hold		Swing	+1.5	

=== Hulme ===
Hulme
Party	Candidate	Votes	%	±%
Labour	J. V. Marshall*	1,488	57.5	−9.6
Liberal	P. Thompson	523	20.2	+5.8
Conservative	W. H. Cox	386	14.9	−3.7
Socialist Unity	B. Crossman	139	5.4	+5.4
Communist	R. W. Gwilt	54	2.1	+2.1
Majority		965	37.4	−11.1
Turnout		2,590	29.4	
Labour hold		Swing	-7.7	

=== Levenshulme ===
Levenshulme
Party	Candidate	Votes	%	±%
Conservative	J. K. Barber*	2,001	40.7	−10.9
Labour	S. Loughlin	1,827	37.2	−1.0
Liberal	K. Whitmore	1,085	22.1	+13.7
Majority		174	3.5	−9.9
Turnout		4,913	38.4	
Conservative hold		Swing	-4.9	

=== Lightbowne ===
Lightbowne
Party	Candidate	Votes	%	±%
Labour	H. T. Lee*	2,560	55.5	+8.2
Conservative	N. McHardy	2,051	44.5	−8.2
Majority		509	11.0	+5.5
Turnout		4,611	43.0	
Labour hold		Swing	+8.2	

=== Lloyd Street ===
Lloyd Street
Party	Candidate	Votes	%	±%
Labour	H. Collins*	2,364	53.2	+2.6
Conservative	A. D. Neville	1,867	42.0	−2.0
Liberal	P. Davis	212	4.8	+0.5
Majority		497	11.2	+4.6
Turnout		4,443	35.8	
Labour hold		Swing	+2.3	

=== Longsight ===
Longsight
Party	Candidate	Votes	%	±%
Labour	V. Stevens	2,007	54.1	+2.6
Conservative	A. Malpas*	1,516	40.9	−7.3
Liberal	C. R. Brammer	184	5.0	+5.0
Majority		491	13.2	+9.7
Turnout		3,707	34.4	
Labour gain from Conservative		Swing	+4.9	

=== Miles Platting ===
Miles Platting
Party	Candidate	Votes	%	±%
Labour	G. Conquest	1,417	76.3	−3.0
Conservative	A. E. Halliday	337	18.1	−2.6
National Front	N. T. G. Wallace	103	5.5	+5.5
Majority		1,080	58.2	−0.4
Turnout		1,857	24.0	
Labour hold		Swing	-0.2	

=== Moss Side ===
Moss Side
Party	Candidate	Votes	%	±%
Labour	R. E. Talbot*	1,360	70.0	+17.2
Conservative	S. Hussain	364	18.7	−2.7
Liberal	L. Ford	220	11.3	+11.3
Majority		996	51.2	+24.3
Turnout		1,944	27.2	
Labour hold		Swing	+9.9	

=== Moston ===
Moston
Party	Candidate	Votes	%	±%
Conservative	G. Hurley	2,867	55.2	−6.7
Labour	A. E. Bowden*	2,327	44.8	+6.7
Majority		540	10.4	−13.4
Turnout		5,194	44.5	
Conservative gain from Labour		Swing	-6.7	

=== Newton Heath ===
Newton Heath
Party	Candidate	Votes	%	±%
Labour	M. J. Taylor*	2,165	57.0	+8.0
Conservative	L. Clarke	1,636	43.0	−5.3
Majority		529	14.0	+13.3
Turnout		3,801	39.2	
Labour hold		Swing	+6.6	

=== Northenden ===
Northenden
Party	Candidate	Votes	%	±%
Conservative	G. Leigh*	2,697	46.3	−5.2
Labour	A. J. Spencer	2,546	43.8	+2.2
Liberal	L. Griffiths	576	9.9	+4.5
Majority		151	2.6	−7.3
Turnout		5,819	46.9	
Conservative hold		Swing	-3.7	

=== Old Moat ===
Old Moat
Party	Candidate	Votes	%	±%
Conservative	T. F. Lavin*	2,314	58.7	+6.1
Labour	S. Jean	1,558	39.5	+2.2
Communist	N. J. Gilroy	73	1.9	−0.0
Majority		756	19.2	+3.9
Turnout		3,945	38.7	
Conservative hold		Swing	+1.9	

=== Rusholme ===
Rusholme
Party	Candidate	Votes	%	±%
Conservative	M. Pierce*	2,289	55.0	−9.2
Labour	L. Byrne	1,585	38.1	+5.5
Liberal	M. J. Hodgson	286	6.9	+6.9
Majority		704	16.9	−14.8
Turnout		4,160	29.8	
Conservative hold		Swing	-7.3	

=== Withington ===
Withington
Party	Candidate	Votes	%	±%
Conservative	E. R. Coker*	1,971	42.6	−12.4
Liberal	A. Jones	1,492	32.2	+13.5
Labour	F. Yaffe	1,169	25.2	−0.2
Majority		479	10.3	−19.3
Turnout		4,632	38.8	
Conservative hold		Swing	-12.9	

=== Woodhouse Park ===
Woodhouse Park
Party	Candidate	Votes	%	±%
Labour	G. Hall*	2,820	67.5	+8.1
Conservative	J. C. Ridgard	1,233	29.5	−3.2
National Front	T. J. Hansen	125	3.0	+3.0
Majority		1,587	38.0	+11.3
Turnout		4,178	37.3	
Labour hold		Swing	+5.6	

== By-elections between 1978 and 1979 ==
=== Withington, 16 November 1978 ===
Caused by the resignation of Councillor Ted Coker (Conservative, Withington, elected 12 May 1960) on 12 October 1978.

Withington
Party	Candidate	Votes	%	±%
Liberal	Audrey Jones	2,137	52.8	+20.6
Conservative	James Hill	1,297	32.1	−10.5
Labour	Alfred Home	610	15.1	−10.1
Majority		840	20.8	+10.5
Turnout		4,044	33.9	−4.9
Liberal gain from Conservative		Swing	+15.5	
