= Beswick (ward) =

- Ward
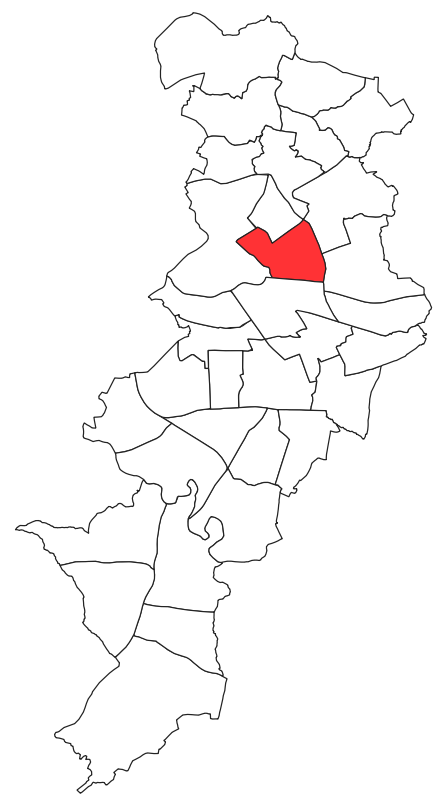
- Beswick ward (1973) within Manchester

- Coat of arms
- Country: United Kingdom
- Constituent country: England
- Region: North West England
- County: Greater Manchester
- Metropolitan borough: Manchester
- Created: November 1919
- Named for: Beswick

Government
  - Type: Unicameral
  - Body: Manchester City Council
- UK Parliamentary Constituency: Manchester Central

Beswick was an electoral division of Manchester City Council which was represented from 1919 until 1982. It covered Beswick and parts of Ancoats.

== Overview ==
Beswick ward was created in 1919, from the western portion of the Bradford ward. The ward was largely unaffected by city-wide boundary revisions in 1950, however, further revisions in 1971, transferred part of Ancoats from the former New Cross ward. In 1982, the ward was abolished, and its remaining area became part of the new Beswick and Clayton ward.

From 1919 until 1955, the ward formed part of the Manchester Clayton Parliamentary constituency. From 1955 until 1974, it was part of the Manchester Exchange Parliamentary constituency. From 1974 until its abolition, it was part of the Manchester Central Parliamentary constituency.

== Councillors ==
Election	Councillor	Councillor	Councillor
1919	M. E. Smith (Lab)	P. J. Wall (Lab)	W. Robinson (Lab)
1920	M. E. Smith (Lab)	P. J. Wall (Lab)	W. Robinson (Lab)
1921	M. E. Smith (Lab)	L. B. Cox (Lab)	W. Robinson (Lab)
1922	M. E. Smith (Lab)	L. B. Cox (Lab)	W. Robinson (Lab)
1923	H. Thorneycroft (Lab)	L. B. Cox (Lab)	W. Robinson (Lab)
1924	H. Thorneycroft (Lab)	L. B. Cox (Lab)	W. Robinson (Lab)
1925	H. Thorneycroft (Lab)	L. B. Cox (Lab)	W. Robinson (Lab)
1926	H. Thorneycroft (Lab)	L. B. Cox (Lab)	W. Robinson (Lab)
1927	H. Thorneycroft (Lab)	L. B. Cox (Lab)	W. Robinson (Lab)
1928	H. Thorneycroft (Lab)	L. B. Cox (Lab)	W. Robinson (Lab)
1929	H. Thorneycroft (Lab)	L. B. Cox (Lab)	W. Robinson (Lab)
1930	H. Thorneycroft (Lab)	L. B. Cox (Lab)	W. Robinson (Lab)
1931	H. Thorneycroft (Lab)	L. B. Cox (Lab)	W. Robinson (Lab)
1932	H. Thorneycroft (Lab)	L. B. Cox (Lab)	W. Robinson (Lab)
1933	H. Thorneycroft (Lab)	L. B. Cox (Lab)	W. Robinson (Lab)
1934	H. Thorneycroft (Lab)	L. B. Cox (Lab)	W. Robinson (Lab)
1935	H. Thorneycroft (Lab)	L. B. Cox (Lab)	W. Robinson (Lab)
April 1936	H. Thorneycroft (Lab)	L. B. Cox (Lab)	M. Bell (Lab)
1936	H. Thorneycroft (Lab)	L. B. Cox (Lab)	M. Bell (Lab)
January 1937	H. Thorneycroft (Lab)	L. B. Cox (Lab)	H. Baldwin (Lab)
1937	H. Thorneycroft (Lab)	L. B. Cox (Lab)	H. Baldwin (Lab)
1938	H. Thorneycroft (Lab)	L. B. Cox (Lab)	H. Baldwin (Lab)
1945	H. Baldwin (Lab)	W. Winstanley (Lab)	T. W. Farrell (Lab)
1946	H. Baldwin (Lab)	W. Winstanley (Lab)	T. W. Farrell (Lab)
1947	H. Baldwin (Lab)	W. Winstanley (Lab)	T. W. Farrell (Lab)
1949	H. Baldwin (Lab)	W. Winstanley (Lab)	T. W. Farrell (Lab)
1950	H. Baldwin (Lab)	W. Winstanley (Lab)	T. W. Farrell (Lab)
1951	H. Baldwin (Lab)	W. Winstanley (Lab)	T. W. Farrell (Lab)
1952	H. Baldwin (Lab)	W. Winstanley (Lab)	T. W. Farrell (Lab)
1953	H. Baldwin (Lab)	W. Winstanley (Lab)	T. W. Farrell (Lab)
1954	H. Baldwin (Lab)	W. Winstanley (Lab)	T. W. Farrell (Lab)
1955	H. Baldwin (Lab)	W. Winstanley (Lab)	T. W. Farrell (Lab)
September 1955	J. G. Birtles (Lab)	W. Winstanley (Lab)	T. W. Farrell (Lab)
1956	J. G. Birtles (Lab)	R. Malcolm (Lab)	T. W. Farrell (Lab)
1957	J. G. Birtles (Lab)	R. Malcolm (Lab)	T. W. Farrell (Lab)
1958	J. G. Birtles (Lab)	R. Malcolm (Lab)	T. W. Farrell (Lab)
1959	J. G. Birtles (Lab)	R. Malcolm (Lab)	T. W. Farrell (Lab)
1960	J. G. Birtles (Lab)	J. Dean (Lab)	T. W. Farrell (Lab)
1961	J. G. Birtles (Lab)	J. Dean (Lab)	T. W. Farrell (Lab)
February 1962	J. G. Birtles (Lab)	J. Dean (Lab)	K. Eastham (Lab)
1962	J. G. Birtles (Lab)	J. Dean (Lab)	K. Eastham (Lab)
1963	J. G. Birtles (Lab)	J. Dean (Lab)	K. Eastham (Lab)
1964	J. G. Birtles (Lab)	J. Dean (Lab)	K. Eastham (Lab)
1965	J. G. Birtles (Lab)	J. Dean (Lab)	K. Eastham (Lab)
1967	J. G. Birtles (Lab)	J. Dean (Lab)	K. Eastham (Lab)
1967	J. G. Birtles (Lab)	J. Dean (Lab)	K. Eastham (Lab)
1968	J. G. Birtles (Lab)	J. Dean (Lab)	K. Eastham (Lab)
1969	J. G. Birtles (Lab)	J. Dean (Lab)	K. Eastham (Lab)
1970	J. G. Birtles (Lab)	J. Dean (Lab)	K. Eastham (Lab)
1971	J. Dean (Lab)	K. Eastham (Lab)	J. G. Birtles (Lab)
July 1971	J. Dean (Lab)	K. Eastham (Lab)	S. Corless (Lab)
1972	J. Dean (Lab)	K. Eastham (Lab)	S. Corless (Lab)
1973	J. Dean (Lab)	S. Corless (Lab)	K. Eastham (Lab)
June 1974	J. E. Jackson (Lab)	S. Corless (Lab)	K. Eastham (Lab)
1975	J. E. Jackson (Lab)	S. Corless (Lab)	K. Eastham (Lab)
1976	J. E. Jackson (Lab)	J. Flanagan (Lab)	K. Eastham (Lab)
1978	S. Silverman (Lab)	J. Flanagan (Lab)	K. Eastham (Lab)
1979	S. Silverman (Lab)	J. Flanagan (Lab)	K. Eastham (Lab)
1980	S. Silverman (Lab)	J. Flanagan (Lab)	M. Harrison (Lab)

== Elections ==
=== Elections in 1910s ===
==== November 1919 ====
1919 (3 vacancies)
Party	Candidate	Votes	%	±%
Labour	M. E. Smith	2,858	63.4	
Labour	P. J. Wall	2,783	61.8	
Labour	W. Robinson	2,772	61.5	
Conservative	T. W. H. Preston*	1,777	39.4	
Conservative	O. R. Whittaker*	1,679	37.3	
Conservative	J. Fiddiham	1,647	36.6	
Majority		995	22.1	
Turnout		4,505	36.3	
Labour win (new seat)				
Labour win (new seat)				
Labour win (new seat)				

=== Elections in 1920s ===
==== November 1920 ====
1920
Party	Candidate	Votes	%	±%
Labour	W. Robinson*	2,796	56.1	−7.3
Conservative	J. Fiddiham	2,187	43.9	+4.5
Majority		609	12.2	−9.9
Turnout		4,983	43.7	+7.4
Labour hold		Swing		

==== November 1921 ====
1921
Party	Candidate	Votes	%	±%
Labour	L. B. Cox	3,490	58.1	+1.0
Conservative	J. Fiddiham	2,618	42.9	−1.0
Majority		872	14.2	+2.0
Turnout		6,108	53.8	10.1
Labour hold		Swing		

==== November 1922 ====
1922
Party	Candidate	Votes	%	±%
Labour	M. E. Smith*	3,636	50.2	−7.9
Conservative	J. H. Meachin	3,604	49.8	+7.9
Majority		32	0.4	−13.8
Turnout		7,240	62.0	+8.2
Labour hold		Swing		

==== November 1923 ====
1923
Party	Candidate	Votes	%	±%
Labour	W. Robinson*	4,334	52.4	+2.2
Conservative	J. H. Meachin	3,879	46.9	−2.9
NFDDSS	C. Reilly	57	0.7	N/A
Majority		455	5.5	+5.1
Turnout		8,270		
Labour hold		Swing		

==== November 1924 ====
1924
Party	Candidate	Votes	%	±%
Labour	L. B. Cox*	uncontested		
Labour hold		Swing		

==== November 1925 ====
1925
Party	Candidate	Votes	%	±%
Labour	H. Thorneycroft*	4,754	63.0	N/A
Conservative	J. W. Brownhill	2,792	37.0	N/A
Majority		1,962	26.0	N/A
Turnout		7,546	61.6	N/A
Labour hold		Swing		

==== November 1926 ====
1926
Party	Candidate	Votes	%	±%
Labour	W. Robinson*	uncontested		
Labour hold		Swing		

==== November 1927 ====
1927
Party	Candidate	Votes	%	±%
Labour	L. B. Cox*	4,549	63.6	N/A
Conservative	P. Sims	2,609	36.4	N/A
Majority		1,940	27.2	N/A
Turnout		7,158	59.0	N/A
Labour hold		Swing		

==== November 1928 ====
1928
Party	Candidate	Votes	%	±%
Labour	H. Thorneycroft*	4,946	62.7	−0.9
Conservative	G. Southward	2,937	37.3	+0.9
Majority		2,009	25.4	−1.8
Turnout		7,883	64.8	+5.8
Labour hold		Swing		

==== November 1929 ====
1929
Party	Candidate	Votes	%	±%
Labour	W. Robinson*	uncontested		
Labour hold		Swing		

=== Elections in 1930s ===
==== November 1930 ====
1930
Party	Candidate	Votes	%	±%
Labour	L. B. Cox*	uncontested		
Labour hold		Swing		

==== November 1931 ====
1931
Party	Candidate	Votes	%	±%
Labour	H. Thorneycroft*	3,902	52.3	N/A
Conservative	W. Shaw	3,559	47.7	N/A
Majority		343	4.6	N/A
Turnout		7,461	59.6	
Labour hold		Swing		

==== November 1932 ====
1932
Party	Candidate	Votes	%	±%
Labour	W. Robinson*	4,258	68.0	+15.7
Conservative	R. C. Roberts	2,002	32.0	−15.7
Majority		2,256	36.0	+31.4
Turnout		6,260		
Labour hold		Swing		

==== November 1933 ====
1933
Party	Candidate	Votes	%	±%
Labour	L. B. Cox*	uncontested		
Labour hold		Swing		

==== November 1934 ====
1934
Party	Candidate	Votes	%	±%
Labour	H. Thorneycroft*	4,033	67.3	N/A
Conservative	K. A. Quas-Cohen	1,963	32.7	N/A
Majority		2,070	34.6	N/A
Turnout		5,996		
Labour hold		Swing		

==== November 1935 ====
1935
Party	Candidate	Votes	%	±%
Labour	W. Robinson*	uncontested		
Labour hold		Swing		

==== April 1936 (by-election) ====
By-election: 30 April 1936
Party	Candidate	Votes	%	±%
Labour	M. Bell	uncontested		
Labour hold		Swing		

==== November 1936 ====
1936
Party	Candidate	Votes	%	±%
Labour	L. B. Cox*	uncontested		
Labour hold		Swing		

==== January 1937 (by-election) ====
By-election: 21 January 1937
Party	Candidate	Votes	%	±%
Labour	H. Baldwin	uncontested		
Labour hold		Swing		

==== November 1937 ====
1937
Party	Candidate	Votes	%	±%
Labour	H. Thorneycroft*	uncontested		
Labour hold		Swing		

==== November 1938 ====
1938
Party	Candidate	Votes	%	±%
Labour	H. Baldwin*	uncontested		
Labour hold		Swing		

=== Elections in 1940s ===
==== November 1945 ====
1945 (2 vacancies)
Party	Candidate	Votes	%	±%
Labour	W. Winstanley*	3,831	75.0	N/A
Labour	T. W. Farrell	3,758	73.5	N/A
Independent	J. McGuiness	1,279	25.0	N/A
Majority		2,479	48.5	N/A
Turnout		5,110	34.2	
Labour hold		Swing		
Labour hold		Swing		

==== November 1946 ====
1946
Party	Candidate	Votes	%	±%
Labour	H. Baldwin*	3,383	68.2'	−6.8
Conservative	R. S. Smith	1,577	31.8	N/A
Majority		1,806	36.4	−12.1
Turnout		4,960		
Labour hold		Swing		

==== November 1947 ====
1947
Party	Candidate	Votes	%	±%
Labour	T. W. Farrell*	4,845	58.0	−10.2
Conservative	G. Bryant	3,511	42.0	+10.2
Majority		1,334	16.0	−20.4
Turnout		8,356		
Labour hold		Swing		

==== May 1949 ====
1949
Party	Candidate	Votes	%	±%
Labour	W. Winstanley*	5,166	63.7	+5.7
Conservative	W. Morgan	2,803	34.5	−7.5
Communist	T. Royle	146	1.8	N/A
Majority		2,363	29.2	+13.2
Turnout		8,115		
Labour hold		Swing		

=== Elections in 1950s ===
==== May 1950 ====
1950 (new boundaries)
Party	Candidate	Votes	%	±%
Labour	H. Baldwin*	3,970	73.4	
Conservative	A. Nixon	1,342	24.8	
Communist	T. Royle	97	1.8	
Majority		2,628	48.6	
Turnout		5,409		
Labour hold		Swing		

==== May 1951 ====
1951
Party	Candidate	Votes	%	±%
Labour	T. W. Farrell*	3,460	63.8	−9.6
Conservative	C. P. R. Dunn	1,966	36.2	+11.4
Majority		1,494	27.6	−21.0
Turnout		5,426		
Labour hold		Swing		

==== May 1952 ====
1952
Party	Candidate	Votes	%	±%
Labour	W. Winstanley	4,794	75.6	+11.8
Conservative	C. P. R. Dunn	1,546	24.4	−11.8
Majority		3,248	51.2	+23.6
Turnout		6,340		
Labour hold		Swing		

==== May 1953 ====
1953
Party	Candidate	Votes	%	±%
Labour	H. Baldwin*	3,499	76.4	+0.8
Conservative	H. Broderick	1,083	23.6	−0.8
Majority		2,416	52.8	+1.6
Turnout		4,582		
Labour hold		Swing		

==== May 1954 ====
1954
Party	Candidate	Votes	%	±%
Labour	T. W. Farrell*	3,471	78.2	+1.8
Conservative	H. Broderick	969	21.8	−1.8
Majority		2,502	56.4	+3.6
Turnout		4,440		
Labour hold		Swing		

==== May 1955 ====
1955
Party	Candidate	Votes	%	±%
Labour	W. Winstanley*	3,202	74.1	−4.1
Conservative	J. Vernon	1,119	25.9	+4.1
Majority		2,083	48.2	−8.2
Turnout		4,321		
Labour hold		Swing		

==== September 1955 (by-election) ====
By-election: 22 September 1955
Party	Candidate	Votes	%	±%
Labour	J. G. Birtles	2,538	71.5	−2.6
Conservative	J. Carson	1,012	28.5	+2.6
Majority		1,526	43.0	−5.2
Turnout		3,550		
Labour hold		Swing		

==== May 1956 ====
1956 (2 vacancies)
Party	Candidate	Votes	%	±%
Labour	J. G. Birtles*	2,275	77.2	+3.1
Labour	R. Malcolm	2,139	72.6	−1.5
Conservative	R. B. Crompton	738	25.1	−0.8
Majority		1,401	47.5	−0.7
Turnout		2,945		
Labour hold		Swing		
Labour hold		Swing		

==== May 1957 ====
1957
Party	Candidate	Votes	%	±%
Labour	T. W. Farrell*	3,013	84.8	+7.6
Conservative	W. M. Hall	541	15.2	−9.9
Majority		2,472	69.6	+22.1
Turnout		3,554		
Labour hold		Swing		

==== May 1958 ====
1958
Party	Candidate	Votes	%	±%
Labour	R. Malcolm*	2,623	83.9	−0.9
Conservative	D. E. Logan	505	16.1	+0.9
Majority		2,118	67.8	−1.8
Turnout		3,128		
Labour hold		Swing		

==== May 1959 ====
1959
Party	Candidate	Votes	%	±%
Labour	J. G. Birtles*	2,785	80.6	−3.3
Conservative	H. L. W. Glover	672	19.4	+3.3
Majority		2,113	61.2	−6.6
Turnout		3,457		
Labour hold		Swing		

=== Elections in 1960s ===
==== May 1960 ====
1960 (2 vacancies)
Party	Candidate	Votes	%	±%
Labour	T. W. Farrell*	1,779	64.3	−16.3
Labour	J. Dean	1,686	61.0	−19.6
Conservative	K. A. Edis	986	35.7	+16.3
Majority		700	25.3	−35.9
Turnout		2,765		
Labour hold		Swing		
Labour hold		Swing		

==== May 1961 ====
1961
Party	Candidate	Votes	%	±%
Labour	J. Dean*	2,567	76.7	+12.1
Conservative	K. A. Edis	780	23.3	−12.4
Majority		1,787	53.4	+28.1
Turnout		3,347		
Labour hold		Swing		

==== February 1962 (by-election) ====
By-election: 8 February 1962
Party	Candidate	Votes	%	±%
Labour	K. Eastham	1,546	82.5	+5.8
Conservative	K. A. Edis	328	17.5	−5.8
Majority		1,218	65.0	+11.6
Turnout		1,874		
Labour hold		Swing		

==== May 1962 ====
1962
Party	Candidate	Votes	%	±%
Labour	J. G. Birtles*	2,341	84.0	+7.3
Conservative	S. Mottram	266	9.5	−13.8
Union Movement	D. E. Hesketh	181	6.5	N/A
Majority		2,075	74.5	+21.1
Turnout		2,788		
Labour hold		Swing		

==== May 1963 ====
1963
Party	Candidate	Votes	%	±%
Labour	K. Eastham*	2,613	86.7	+2.7
Independent	D. S. Lawson	208	6.9	N/A
Conservative	S. Mottram	193	6.4	−3.1
Majority		2,405	79.8	+5.3
Turnout		3,014		
Labour hold		Swing		

==== May 1964 ====
1964
Party	Candidate	Votes	%	±%
Labour	J. Dean*	2,469	85.3	−1.4
Conservative	S. Mottram	427	14.7	+8.3
Majority		2,042	70.6	−9.2
Turnout		2,896		
Labour hold		Swing		

==== May 1965 ====
1965
Party	Candidate	Votes	%	±%
Labour	J. G. Birtles*	1,626	74.3	−11.0
Conservative	N. A. Green	562	25.7	+11.0
Majority		1,064	48.6	−22.0
Turnout		2,188		
Labour hold		Swing		

==== May 1966 ====
1966
Party	Candidate	Votes	%	±%
Labour	K. Eastham*	1,605	80.4	+6.1
Conservative	N. A. Green	392	19.6	−6.1
Majority		1,213	60.8	+12.2
Turnout		1,997		
Labour hold		Swing		

==== May 1967 ====
1967
Party	Candidate	Votes	%	±%
Labour	J. Dean*	1,031	63.6	−16.8
Conservative	R. Lilley	370	22.8	+3.2
Independent	E. Bevan	219	13.6	N/A
Majority		661	40.8	−20.0
Turnout		1,620		
Labour hold		Swing		

==== May 1968 ====
1968
Party	Candidate	Votes	%	±%
Labour	J. G. Birtles*	922	62.2	−1.4
Conservative	R. Lilley	560	37.8	+15.0
Majority		362	24.4	−16.4
Turnout		1,482		
Labour hold		Swing		

==== May 1969 ====
1969
Party	Candidate	Votes	%	±%
Labour	K. Eastham*	994	67.5	+5.3
Conservative	E. M. Bevan	478	32.5	−5.3
Majority		516	35.0	+10.6
Turnout		1,472		
Labour hold		Swing		

=== Elections in 1970s ===
==== May 1970 ====
1970
Party	Candidate	Votes	%	±%
Labour	J. Dean*	1,223	75.3	+7.8
Conservative	E. M. Bevan	402	24.7	−7.8
Majority		821	50.6	+15.6
Turnout		1,625		
Labour hold		Swing		

==== May 1971 ====
1971 (3 vacancies; new boundaries)
Party	Candidate	Votes	%	±%
Labour	J. Dean*	2,609	89.8	
Labour	K. Eastham*	2,517	86.6	
Labour	J. G. Birtles*	2,280	78.5	
Conservative	D. Eastwood	585	20.1	
Conservative	A. Bradshaw	326	11.2	
Conservative	J. R. Cawley	310	10.7	
Communist	J. Coupe	92	3.2	
Majority		1,695	58.3	
Turnout		2,906		
Labour win (new seat)				
Labour win (new seat)				
Labour win (new seat)				

==== July 1971 (by-election) ====
By-election: 8 July 1971
Party	Candidate	Votes	%	±%
Labour	S. Corless	1,522	88.3	−1.5
Conservative	D. Eastwood	133	7.7	−14.4
Independent	J. Lewis	68	3.9	N/A
Majority		1,389	80.6	+22.3
Turnout		1,723		
Labour hold		Swing		

==== May 1972 ====
1972
Party	Candidate	Votes	%	±%
Labour	S. Corless*	2,005	89.5	−0.3
Conservative	D. Eastwood	236	10.5	−9.6
Majority		1,769	79.0	+20.7
Turnout		2,241		
Labour hold		Swing		

==== May 1973 ====
1973 (3 vacancies; reorganisation)
Party	Candidate	Votes	%	±%
Labour	J. Dean*	1,528	80.6	−8.6
Labour	S. Corless*	1,514	79.9	−9.6
Labour	K. Eastham*	1,485	78.3	−11.2
Conservative	J. C. J. Cavill	252	13.3	+2.8
Conservative	J. Cartland	238	12.6	+2.1
Conservative	W. Whitmore	235	12.4	+1.9
Majority		1,233	65.0	−14.0
Turnout		1,896		
Labour hold		Swing		
Labour hold		Swing		
Labour hold		Swing		

==== June 1974 (by-election) ====
By-election: 27 June 1974
Party	Candidate	Votes	%	±%
Labour	J. E. Jackson	1,298	70.9	−14.9
Liberal	W. J. Ellwood	248	13.6	+13.6
Conservative	D. Porter	173	9.5	−4.6
National Front	S. McKenzie	111	6.1	+6.1
Majority		1,050	57.4	−14.3
Turnout		1,830		
Labour hold		Swing	-14.2	

==== May 1975 ====
1975
Party	Candidate	Votes	%	±%
Labour	K. Eastham*	1,282	79.0	−6.8
Conservative	J. R. Cawley	341	21.0	+6.8
Majority		941	58.0	−13.7
Turnout		1,623		
Labour hold		Swing	-6.8	

==== May 1976 ====
1976
Party	Candidate	Votes	%	±%
Labour	J. Flanagan	1,760	75.4	−3.6
Conservative	J. Cartland	449	19.2	−1.8
Liberal	P. Coleman	125	5.4	+5.4
Majority		1,311	56.2	−1.8
Turnout		2,334		
Labour hold		Swing	-1.8	

==== May 1978 ====
1978
Party	Candidate	Votes	%	±%
Labour	S. Silverman	1,746	77.3	+1.9
Conservative	J. Cartland	370	16.4	−2.8
National Front	A. Tatton	81	3.6	+3.6
Liberal	J. Thomson	63	2.8	−2.6
Majority		1,376	60.9	+4.7
Turnout		2,260	27.7	
Labour hold		Swing	+2.3	

==== May 1979 ====
1979
Party	Candidate	Votes	%	±%
Labour	K. Eastham*	3,505	81.5	+4.2
Conservative	C. Hare	796	18.5	+2.1
Majority		2,709	63.0	+2.1
Turnout		4,301	61.2	+33.5
Labour hold		Swing	+1.0	

=== Elections in 1980s ===
==== May 1980 ====
1980 (2 vacancies)
Party	Candidate	Votes	%	±%
Labour	J. Flanagan*	2,061	81.6	+0.1
Labour	M. Harrison	1,898		
Independent	W. C. Carman	208	8.2	+8.2
Conservative	C. Hare	148	5.8	−12.7
Conservative	R. Plant	121		
Liberal	K. Parkinson	109	4.3	+4.3
Majority		1,690	73.4	+10.4
Turnout		2,526	34.1	−27.1
Labour hold		Swing		
Labour hold		Swing	-4.0	

== See also ==
- Manchester City Council
- Manchester City Council elections
