= 1961 Manchester City Council election =

UK local government election

- 11 May 1961

38 of 152 seats to Manchester City Council 77 seats needed for a majority
	First party	Second party	Third party
Party	Labour	Conservative	Liberal
Last election	17 seats, 39.1%	21 seats, 43.9%	1 seats, 11.5%
Seats before	82	69	3
Seats won	22	15	1
Seats after	79	69	4
Seat change	▼3	▲2	▲1
Popular vote	69,696	65,425	21,575
Percentage	44.0%	41.3%	13.6%
Swing	▲4.9%	▼2.6%	▲2.1%
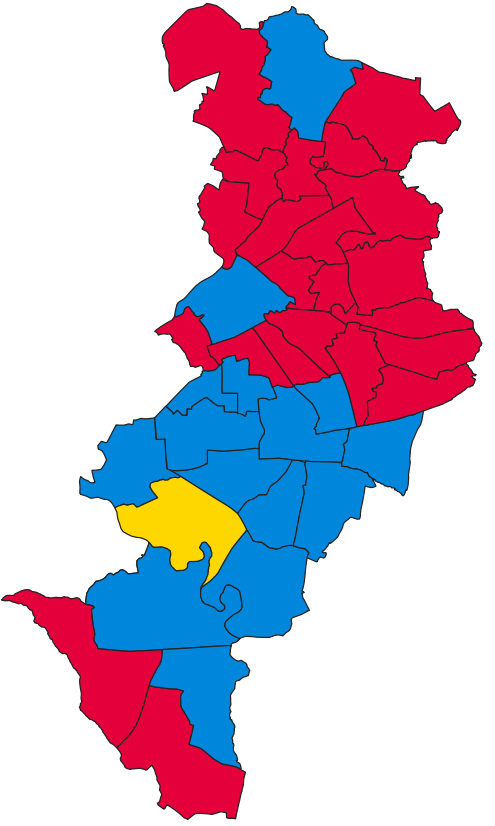
- Map of results of 1961 election
Leader of the Council before election
Labour
Leader of the Council after election
Labour

Elections to Manchester City Council were held on Thursday, 11 May 1961. One third of the councillors seats were up for election, with each successful candidate to serve a three-year term of office. The Labour Party retained overall control of the council.

== Election result ==
Party	Votes		Seats			Full Council	
Labour Party	69,696 (44.0%)	▲4.9	22 (57.9%)	22 / 38	▼3	79 (52.0%)	79 / 152
Conservative Party	65,425 (41.3%)	▼2.6	15 (39.5%)	15 / 38	▲2	69 (45.4%)	69 / 152
Liberal Party	21,575 (13.6%)	▲2.1	1 (2.6%)	1 / 38	▲1	4 (2.6%)	4 / 152
Ratepayers	3,892 (2.5%)	▼2.4	0 (0.0%)	0 / 38	Steady	0 (0.0%)	0 / 152
Communist	743 (0.5%)	Steady	0 (0.0%)	0 / 38	Steady	0 (0.0%)	0 / 152
Union Movement	178 (0.1%)	Steady	0 (0.0%)	0 / 38	Steady	0 (0.0%)	0 / 152

=== Full council ===
↓
79	4	69

=== Aldermen ===
↓
20	2	16

=== Councillors ===
↓
59	2	53

== Ward results ==
=== Alexandra Park ===
Alexandra Park
Party	Candidate	Votes	%	±%
Conservative	L. Bailey*	2,841	54.2	−8.4
Liberal	A. Alexander	1,834	35.0	+7.4
Labour	G. Hayward	570	10.8	+1.0
Majority		1,007	19.2	−15.8
Turnout		5,245		
Conservative hold		Swing		

=== All Saints' ===
All Saints'
Party	Candidate	Votes	%	±%
Labour	T. Thomas*	1,511	71.5	+2.9
Conservative	R. W. Phillips	603	28.5	−2.9
Majority		908	43.0	+5.8
Turnout		2,114		
Labour hold		Swing		

=== Ardwick ===
Ardwick
Party	Candidate	Votes	%	±%
Labour	W. Parkinson*	1,625	72.2	+9.0
Conservative	W. N. Fleetwood	625	27.8	−9.0
Majority		1,000	44.4	+18.0
Turnout		2,250		
Labour hold		Swing		

=== Baguley ===
Baguley
Party	Candidate	Votes	%	±%
Labour	H. Jenkins*	3,452	53.2	+4.5
Conservative	J. Crowe	3,036	46.8	−4.5
Majority		416	6.4	
Turnout		6,488		
Labour hold		Swing		

=== Barlow Moor ===
Barlow Moor
Party	Candidate	Votes	%	±%
Liberal	J. Cunningham	1,607	42.5	+17.4
Conservative	J. P. Cox*	1,604	42.4	−12.8
Labour	P. Potts	567	15.1	−4.5
Majority		3	0.1	
Turnout		3,778		
Liberal gain from Conservative		Swing		

=== Benchill ===
Benchill
Party	Candidate	Votes	%	±%
Conservative	D. L. Cooke	2,813	49.5	−0.4
Labour	H. Lloyd*	2,747	48.4	+0.6
Communist	M. Taylor	118	2.1	−0.2
Majority		66	1.1	−1.0
Turnout		5,678		
Conservative gain from Labour		Swing		

=== Beswick ===
Beswick
Party	Candidate	Votes	%	±%
Labour	J. Dean*	2,567	76.7	+12.1
Conservative	K. A. Edis	780	23.3	−12.4
Majority		1,787	53.4	+28.1
Turnout		3,347		
Labour hold		Swing		

=== Blackley ===
Blackley
Party	Candidate	Votes	%	±%
Conservative	W. Burrows*	2,912	47.9	−6.3
Labour	S. N. M. Moxley	1,834	30.2	−1.4
Liberal	W. Wren	1,327	21.9	+7.7
Majority		1,078	17.7	−4.9
Turnout		6,073		
Conservative hold		Swing		

=== Bradford ===
Bradford
Party	Candidate	Votes	%	±%
Labour	T. Lomas*	2,754	74.2	+6.7
Conservative	L. N. Mallinson	959	25.8	−6.7
Majority		1,795	48.4	+13.4
Turnout		3,713		
Labour hold		Swing		

=== Burnage ===
Burnage
Party	Candidate	Votes	%	±%
Conservative	G. Lord*	2,409	46.7	−5.1
Liberal	W. Thorpe	1,486	28.8	+8.6
Labour	H. Conway	1,267	24.5	−3.5
Majority		923	17.9	−5.9
Turnout		5,162		
Conservative hold		Swing		

=== Cheetham ===
Cheetham
Party	Candidate	Votes	%	±%
Labour	H. Goldstone*	1,700	52.0	+11.1
Liberal	M. Needoff	1,571	48.0	−11.1
Majority		129	4.0	
Turnout		3,271		
Labour hold		Swing		

=== Chorlton-cum-Hardy ===
Chorlton-cum-Hardy
Party	Candidate	Votes	%	±%
Conservative	M. Whittaker*	2,626	48.1	−7.1
Liberal	M. Cheers	1,267	23.2	N/A
Ratepayers	T. A. Harper	893	16.3	−18.1
Labour	H. P. D. Paget	677	12.4	+2.0
Majority		1,359	24.9	+4.1
Turnout		5,463		
Conservative hold		Swing		

=== Collegiate Church ===
Collegiate Church
Party	Candidate	Votes	%	±%
Labour	B. S. Langton*	1,618	80.1	+11.2
Conservative	K. Sharman	277	13.7	−7.8
Communist	K. Bloch	124	6.2	−3.4
Majority		1,341	66.4	+19.0
Turnout		2,019		
Labour hold		Swing		

=== Crumpsall ===
Crumpsall
Party	Candidate	Votes	%	±%
Labour	F. J. Balcombe*	3,874	47.2	+18.3
Conservative	F. R. Butler	3,262	39.7	−12.1
Liberal	A. F. Sullivan	1,078	13.1	−6.2
Majority		611	7.5	
Turnout		8,213		
Labour hold		Swing		

=== Didsbury ===
Didsbury
Party	Candidate	Votes	%	±%
Conservative	M. Crawford*	3,281	59.8	+9.4
Liberal	H. Golding	1,695	30.9	−11.3
Labour	A. Haslam	513	9.3	+1.9
Majority		1,586	28.9	+20.7
Turnout		5,489		
Conservative hold		Swing		

=== Gorton North ===
Gorton North
Party	Candidate	Votes	%	±%
Labour	N. Leech*	3,359	69.0	+2.1
Conservative	J. Whitwell	1,512	31.0	−2.1
Majority		1,847	38.0	+4.2
Turnout		4,871		
Labour hold		Swing		

=== Gorton South ===
Gorton South
Party	Candidate	Votes	%	±%
Labour	H. J. Batson*	2,062	58.3	+3.0
Conservative	C. M. Clarke	1,476	41.7	−3.0
Majority		586	16.6	+6.0
Turnout		3,538		
Labour hold		Swing		

=== Harpurhey ===
Harpurhey
Party	Candidate	Votes	%	±%
Labour	H. Waddicor	2,233	54.8	+1.1
Conservative	J. Chatterton	1,842	45.2	−1.1
Majority		391	9.6	+2.2
Turnout		4,075		
Labour hold		Swing		

=== Hugh Oldham ===
Hugh Oldham
Party	Candidate	Votes	%	±%
Labour	H. Langan*	1,553	71.1	+1.3
Conservative	P. Murphy	479	21.9	−1.5
Communist	E. Cohen	151	7.0	+0.2
Majority		1,074	49.2	+2.8
Turnout		2,183		
Labour hold		Swing		

=== Levenshulme ===
Levenshulme
Party	Candidate	Votes	%	±%
Conservative	J. Bowes*	2,095	37.3	−3.0
Ratepayers	J. A. Gannon	1,632	29.1	−4.1
Labour	A. Hardisty	1,017	18.1	+4.8
Liberal	J. Berisford	867	15.5	+2.4
Majority		463	8.2	+1.1
Turnout		5,611		
Conservative hold		Swing		

=== Lightbowne ===
Lightbowne
Party	Candidate	Votes	%	±%
Labour	K. Franklin*	2,859	41.5	+5.5
Conservative	J. S. Cumpstay	2,718	39.4	−7.6
Liberal	E. Platt	1,320	19.1	+2.1
Majority		141	2.1	
Turnout		6,897		
Labour hold		Swing		

=== Longsight ===
Longsight
Party	Candidate	Votes	%	±%
Conservative	J. G. Hopkins*	2,099	52.6	+12.4
Labour	B. Lawson	1,078	27.0	+2.1
Ratepayers	W. F. Wilding	683	17.1	−17.8
Communist	H. Johnson	129	3.2	N/A
Majority		1,021	25.6	+20.3
Turnout		3,989		
Conservative hold		Swing		

=== Miles Platting ===
Miles Platting
Party	Candidate	Votes	%	±%
Labour	R. P. Hughes*	1,552	60.3	+3.0
Conservative	J. D. Cheetham	1,022	39.7	−3.0
Majority		530	20.6	+6.0
Turnout		2,574		
Labour hold		Swing		

=== Moss Side East ===
Moss Side East
Party	Candidate	Votes	%	±%
Conservative	P. Whitby	1,799	55.0	+15.8
Labour	E. C. Bedgood*	1,470	45.0	+7.3
Majority		329	10.0	+8.5
Turnout		3,269		
Conservative gain from Labour		Swing		

=== Moss Side West ===
Moss Side West
Party	Candidate	Votes	%	±%
Conservative	P. Buckley*	1,983	49.0	−6.3
Labour	J. S. Goldstone	1,381	34.1	+7.9
Ratepayers	G. J. Playford	505	12.5	−3.4
Union Movement	G. A. Webb	178	4.4	+1.9
Majority		602	14.9	−14.2
Turnout		4,047		
Conservative hold		Swing		

=== Moston ===
Moston
Party	Candidate	Votes	%	±%
Labour	C. C. Lamb*	3,390	46.1	+3.9
Conservative	P. Collins	2,748	37.4	−8.3
Liberal	J. Bulmer	1,221	16.5	+4.4
Majority		642	8.7	
Turnout		7,359		
Labour hold		Swing		

=== New Cross ===
New Cross
Party	Candidate	Votes	%	±%
Labour	C. Blackwell*	1,238	73.2	+2.5
Conservative	F. Hargreaves	454	26.8	−2.5
Majority		784	46.4	+5.0
Turnout		1,692		
Labour hold		Swing		

=== Newton Heath ===
Newton Heath
Party	Candidate	Votes	%	±%
Labour	A. Logan*	2,160	55.5	+1.8
Conservative	R. Thorpe	1,642	42.2	−4.1
Communist	J. A. Day	92	2.3	N/A
Majority		518	13.3	+5.9
Turnout		3,894		
Labour hold		Swing		

=== Northenden ===
Northenden
Party	Candidate	Votes	%	±%
Conservative	G. Leigh	2,982	38.0	−5.4
Labour	J. Davis*	2,711	34.5	−2.2
Liberal	R. H. Hargreaves	2,160	27.5	+7.6
Majority		271	3.5	−3.2
Turnout		7,853		
Conservative gain from Labour		Swing		

=== Old Moat ===
Old Moat
Party	Candidate	Votes	%	±%
Conservative	H. P. Humphris*	1,485	43.4	−8.6
Liberal	T. Kay	1,289	37.7	+6.4
Labour	F. W. Blaine	645	18.9	+2.1
Majority		196	5.7	−15.0
Turnout		3,419		
Conservative hold		Swing		

=== Openshaw ===
Openshaw
Party	Candidate	Votes	%	±%
Labour	L. Thomas*	2,817	66.9	+3.1
Conservative	B. Moore	1,262	30.0	−3.2
Communist	H. Holland	129	3.1	+0.1
Majority		1,555	36.9	+6.3
Turnout		4,208		
Labour hold		Swing		

=== Rusholme ===
Rusholme
Party	Candidate	Votes	%	±%
Conservative	H. Stockdale*	2,084	56.5	+5.4
Liberal	F. N. Wedlock	834	22.6	+13.4
Labour	D. A. Warby	772	20.9	−0.4
Majority		1,250	33.9	+4.1
Turnout		3,690		
Conservative hold		Swing		

=== St. George's ===
St. George's
Party	Candidate	Votes	%	±%
Labour	E. Mellor*	1,749	69.4	+1.4
Conservative	S. Alexander	771	30.6	−1.4
Majority		978	38.8	+2.8
Turnout		2,520		
Labour hold		Swing		

=== St. Luke's ===
St. Luke's
Party	Candidate	Votes	%	±%
Labour	S. Rimmer*	1,733	53.9	+11.8
Conservative	M. J. Holberry	1,305	40.6	−3.3
Ratepayers	N. Robinson	179	5.6	−8.4
Majority		428	13.3	
Turnout		3,217		
Labour hold		Swing		

=== St. Mark's ===
St. Mark's
Party	Candidate	Votes	%	±%
Labour	W. Shaw*	2,206	64.2	−0.6
Conservative	E. Geddes	1,230	35.8	+0.6
Majority		976	28.4	−1.2
Turnout		3,436		
Labour hold		Swing		

=== St. Peter's ===
St. Peter's
Party	Candidate	Votes	%	±%
Conservative	N. G. Westbrook*	1,004	61.1	−9.6
Labour	J. Barnett	638	38.9	+9.6
Majority		366	22.2	−19.2
Turnout		1,642		
Conservative hold		Swing		

=== Withington ===
Withington
Party	Candidate	Votes	%	±%
Conservative	J. McGrath*	2,211	46.9	−8.5
Liberal	J. S. Alldridge	2,019	42.9	+6.8
Labour	B. Atkinson	481	10.2	+1.7
Majority		192	4.0	−15.3
Turnout		4,711		
Conservative hold		Swing		

=== Woodhouse Park ===
Woodhouse Park
Party	Candidate	Votes	%	±%
Labour	W. Smith*	3,316	73.1	+17.3
Conservative	A. Thurston	1,221	26.9	+3.1
Majority		2,095	46.2	+14.2
Turnout		4,537		
Labour hold		Swing		

== Aldermanic elections ==
=== Aldermanic election, 29 May 1961 ===
At the meeting of the council on 29 May 1961, the terms of office of nineteen aldermen expired.

The following nineteen were elected as aldermen by the council on 29 May 1961 for a term of six years.

Party	Alderman	Ward	Term expires
Conservative	Albert Barratt*	Withington	1967
Labour	Emily Beavan*	Woodhouse Park	1967
Conservative	Lionel Biggs*	Northenden	1967
Conservative	S. P. Dawson*	Newton Heath	1967
Labour	Arthur Donovan*	Cheetham	1967
Conservative	Eveline Hill M.P.*	Openshaw	1967
Labour	H. P. J. Hinderer*	Beswick	1967
Conservative	William Phillip Jackson*	St. Peter's	1967
Conservative	Mary Latchford Kingsmill Jones*	Benchill	1967
Labour	Mary Knight*	New Cross	1967
Conservative	Herbert Lomax*	St. George's	1967
Labour	Forrester Lord*	Crumpsall	1967
Labour	William Oldfield*	All Saints'	1967
Conservative	Wilfred Pegge*	Blackley	1967
Labour	C. E. P. Stott*	Oxford	1967
Labour	John Sutton*	Rusholme	1967
Conservative	Prof. Frank Edward Tylecote*	Didsbury	1967
Conservative	Wallace White	Lightbowne	1967
Labour	William Winstanley*	Bradford	1967

=== Aldermanic election, 6 December 1961 ===
Caused by the death on 16 November 1961 of Alderman William Oldfield (Labour, elected as an alderman by the council on 9 November 1945).

In his place, Councillor Thomas Farrell (Labour, Beswick, elected 1 November 1945) was elected as an alderman by the council on 6 December 1961.

Party	Alderman	Ward	Term expires
Labour	Thomas Farrell	All Saints'	1967

== By-elections between 1961 and 1962 ==
=== Didsbury, 13 July 1961 ===
Caused by the election as an alderman of Councillor Wallace White (Conservative, Didsbury, elected 21 October 1937) on 29 May 1961, following the death on 14 May 1961 of Alderman Thomas Walker (Labour, elected as an alderman by the council on 5 February 1941).

Didsbury
Party	Candidate	Votes	%	±%
Conservative	N. Coe	2,113	56.4	−3.4
Liberal	H. Golding	1,299	34.7	+3.8
Labour	A. Haslam	335	8.9	−0.4
Majority		814	21.7	−6.2
Turnout		3,747		
Conservative hold		Swing		

=== Beswick, 8 February 1962 ===
Caused by the election as an alderman of Councillor Thomas Farrell (Labour, Beswick, elected 1 November 1945) on 6 December 1961, following the death on 16 November 1961 of Alderman William Oldfield (Labour, elected as an alderman by the council on 9 November 1945).

Beswick
Party	Candidate	Votes	%	±%
Labour	K. Eastham	1,546	82.5	+5.8
Conservative	K. A. Edis	328	17.5	−5.8
Majority		1,218	65.0	+11.6
Turnout		1,874		
Labour hold		Swing		
