= 1960 Manchester City Council election =

UK local government election

- 12 May 1960

39 of 152 seats to Manchester City Council 77 seats needed for a majority
| | First party | Second party | Third party |
|---|---|---|---|
| Party | Labour | Conservative | Liberal |
| Last election | 21 seats, 45.4% | 17 seats, 43.9% | 0 seats, 10.0% |
| Seats before | 93 | 57 | 2 |
| Seats won | 17 | 21 | 1 |
| Seats after | 84 | 65 | 3 |
| Seat change | ▼9 | ▲8 | ▲1 |
| Popular vote | 57,758 | 64,790 | 17,024 |
| Percentage | 39.1% | 43.9% | 11.5% |
| Swing | ▼6.3% | Steady | ▲1.5% |
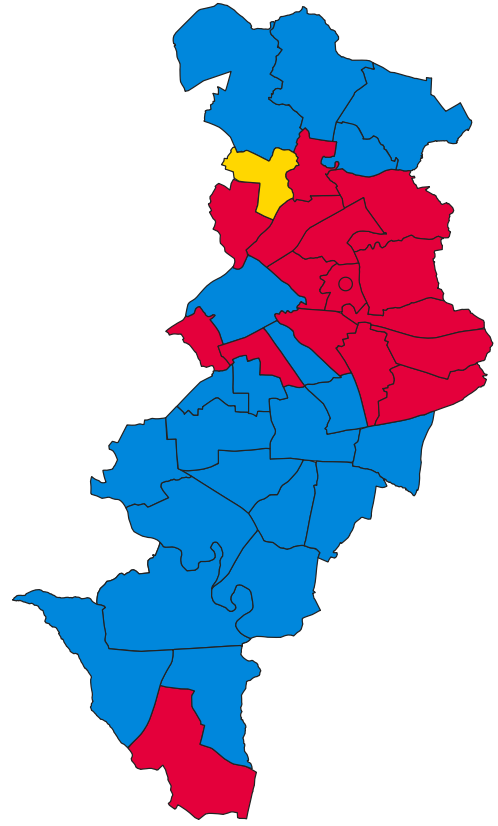
- Map of results of 1960 election
Leader of the Council before election
Labour
Leader of the Council after election
Labour

Elections to Manchester City Council were held on Thursday, 12 May 1960. One third of the councillors seats were up for election, with each successful candidate to serve a three-year term of office. The Labour Party retained overall control of the council.

== Election result ==
| Party | Votes | | Seats | | | Full Council | |
| Labour Party | 57,758 (39.1%) | ▼6.3 | 17 (43.6%) | 17 / 39 | ▼9 | 84 (55.3%) | 84 / 152 |
| Conservative Party | 64,790 (43.9%) | Steady | 21 (53.8%) | 21 / 39 | ▲8 | 65 (42.8%) | 65 / 152 |
| Liberal Party | 17,024 (11.5%) | ▲1.5 | 1 (2.6%) | 1 / 39 | ▲1 | 3 (2.0%) | 3 / 152 |
| Ratepayers | 7,243 (4.9%) | N/A | 0 (0.0%) | 0 / 39 | N/A | 0 (0.0%) | 0 / 152 |
| Communist | 760 (0.5%) | Steady | 0 (0.0%) | 0 / 39 | Steady | 0 (0.0%) | 0 / 152 |
| Union Movement | 89 (0.1%) | Steady | 0 (0.0%) | 0 / 39 | Steady | 0 (0.0%) | 0 / 152 |

=== Full council ===
↓
| 84 | 3 | 65 |

=== Aldermen ===
↓
| 22 | 2 | 14 |

=== Councillors ===
↓
| 62 | 1 | 51 |

== Ward results ==
=== Alexandra Park ===
Alexandra Park
| Party | Candidate | Votes | % | ±% |
|---|---|---|---|---|
| Conservative | N. Thompson* | 3,220 | 62.6 | +1.0 |
| Liberal | A. Alexander | 1,419 | 27.6 | +3.9 |
| Labour | E. McKeon | 504 | 9.8 | −4.9 |
| Majority | | 1,801 | 35.0 | −2.9 |
| Turnout | | 5,143 | | |
| Conservative hold | | Swing | | |

=== All Saints' ===
All Saints'
| Party | Candidate | Votes | % | ±% |
|---|---|---|---|---|
| Labour | F. Hatton* | 1,418 | 68.6 | −4.1 |
| Conservative | R. W. Phillips | 650 | 31.4 | +4.1 |
| Majority | | 768 | 37.2 | −8.2 |
| Turnout | | 2,068 | | |
| Labour hold | | Swing | | |

=== Ardwick ===
Ardwick
| Party | Candidate | Votes | % | ±% |
|---|---|---|---|---|
| Labour | F. Taylor* | 1,525 | 63.2 | 0 |
| Conservative | G. Taylor | 887 | 36.8 | 0 |
| Majority | | 638 | 26.4 | 0 |
| Turnout | | 2,412 | | |
| Labour hold | | Swing | | |

=== Baguley ===
Baguley
| Party | Candidate | Votes | % | ±% |
|---|---|---|---|---|
| Conservative | C. O. Sanders | 3,042 | 51.3 | +3.2 |
| Labour | W. Frost | 2,888 | 48.7 | −3.2 |
| Majority | | 154 | 2.6 | |
| Turnout | | 5,930 | | |
| Conservative gain from Labour | | Swing | | |

=== Barlow Moor ===
Barlow Moor
| Party | Candidate | Votes | % | ±% |
|---|---|---|---|---|
| Conservative | H. Harker* | 1,533 | 55.2 | −9.3 |
| Liberal | A. Newton | 697 | 25.1 | N/A |
| Labour | P. T. Taylor | 545 | 19.6 | −15.9 |
| Majority | | 836 | 30.1 | +1.1 |
| Turnout | | 2,775 | | |
| Conservative hold | | Swing | | |

=== Benchill ===
Benchill
| Party | Candidate | Votes | % | ±% |
|---|---|---|---|---|
| Conservative | A. Williamson | 2,441 | 49.9 | +3.4 |
| Labour | R. L. Griffiths* | 2,339 | 47.8 | −2.7 |
| Communist | M. Taylor | 116 | 2.3 | −0.7 |
| Majority | | 102 | 2.1 | |
| Turnout | | 4,896 | | |
| Conservative gain from Labour | | Swing | | |

=== Beswick ===
Beswick (2 vacancies)
| Party | Candidate | Votes | % | ±% |
|---|---|---|---|---|
| Labour | T. W. Farrell* | 1,779 | 64.3 | −16.3 |
| Labour | J. Dean | 1,686 | 61.0 | −19.6 |
| Conservative | K. A. Edis | 986 | 35.7 | +16.3 |
| Majority | | 700 | 25.3 | −35.9 |
| Turnout | | 2,765 | | |
| Labour hold | | Swing | | |
| Labour hold | | Swing | | |

=== Blackley ===
Blackley
| Party | Candidate | Votes | % | ±% |
|---|---|---|---|---|
| Conservative | E. D. Kirkup | 3,046 | 54.2 | +7.6 |
| Labour | A. J. Fahey* | 1,774 | 31.6 | −2.8 |
| Liberal | W. Wren | 799 | 14.2 | −3.8 |
| Majority | | 1,272 | 22.6 | +9.4 |
| Turnout | | 5,619 | | |
| Conservative gain from Labour | | Swing | | |

=== Bradford ===
Bradford
| Party | Candidate | Votes | % | ±% |
|---|---|---|---|---|
| Labour | J. Taylor* | 2,306 | 67.5 | −4.3 |
| Conservative | P. Whitby | 1,109 | 32.5 | +4.3 |
| Majority | | 1,197 | 35.0 | −8.6 |
| Turnout | | 3,415 | | |
| Labour hold | | Swing | | |

=== Burnage ===
Burnage
| Party | Candidate | Votes | % | ±% |
|---|---|---|---|---|
| Conservative | D. J. Edwards* | 2,431 | 51.8 | +1.5 |
| Labour | W. S. Spink | 1,314 | 28.0 | −2.7 |
| Liberal | H. Tobias | 947 | 20.2 | +1.2 |
| Majority | | 1,117 | 23.8 | +4.2 |
| Turnout | | 4,692 | | |
| Conservative hold | | Swing | | |

=== Cheetham ===
Cheetham
| Party | Candidate | Votes | % | ±% |
|---|---|---|---|---|
| Liberal | S. Needoff | 2,105 | 59.1 | +14.6 |
| Labour | R. B. Prain* | 1,458 | 40.9 | −4.6 |
| Majority | | 647 | 18.2 | |
| Turnout | | 3,563 | | |
| Liberal gain from Labour | | Swing | | |

=== Chorlton-cum-Hardy ===
Chorlton-cum-Hardy
| Party | Candidate | Votes | % | ±% |
|---|---|---|---|---|
| Conservative | S. Ralphs* | 2,607 | 55.2 | −22.0 |
| Ratepayers | T. A. Harper | 1,623 | 34.4 | N/A |
| Labour | P. Potts | 490 | 10.4 | −12.4 |
| Majority | | 984 | 20.8 | −33.6 |
| Turnout | | 4,720 | | |
| Conservative hold | | Swing | | |

=== Collegiate Church ===
Collegiate Church
| Party | Candidate | Votes | % | ±% |
|---|---|---|---|---|
| Labour | R. Finkel* | 975 | 68.9 | −12.0 |
| Conservative | W. J. Pepper | 305 | 21.5 | +8.4 |
| Communist | A. Gadian | 136 | 9.6 | +3.6 |
| Majority | | 670 | 47.4 | −20.4 |
| Turnout | | 1,416 | | |
| Labour hold | | Swing | | |

=== Crumpsall ===
Crumpsall
| Party | Candidate | Votes | % | ±% |
|---|---|---|---|---|
| Conservative | E. Mawdsley* | 3,307 | 51.8 | +6.3 |
| Labour | S. N. M. Moxley | 1,843 | 28.9 | −7.9 |
| Liberal | H. Gilbert | 1,231 | 19.3 | +1.6 |
| Majority | | 1,464 | 22.9 | +14.2 |
| Turnout | | 6,381 | | |
| Conservative hold | | Swing | | |

=== Didsbury ===
Didsbury
| Party | Candidate | Votes | % | ±% |
|---|---|---|---|---|
| Conservative | W. White* | 2,598 | 50.4 | −3.0 |
| Liberal | M. MacInerney | 2,175 | 42.2 | +3.1 |
| Labour | H. Conway | 378 | 7.4 | −0.1 |
| Majority | | 423 | 8.2 | −6.1 |
| Turnout | | 5,151 | | |
| Conservative hold | | Swing | | |

=== Gorton North ===
Gorton North
| Party | Candidate | Votes | % | ±% |
|---|---|---|---|---|
| Labour | P. Roddy* | 2,610 | 66.9 | −1.8 |
| Conservative | J. Whitwell | 1,292 | 33.1 | +1.8 |
| Majority | | 1,318 | 33.8 | −3.6 |
| Turnout | | 3,902 | | |
| Labour hold | | Swing | | |

=== Gorton South ===
Gorton South
| Party | Candidate | Votes | % | ±% |
|---|---|---|---|---|
| Labour | E. Kirkman* | 1,774 | 55.3 | −6.0 |
| Conservative | C. N. Clarke | 1,436 | 44.7 | +6.0 |
| Majority | | 338 | 10.6 | −12.0 |
| Turnout | | 3,210 | | |
| Labour hold | | Swing | | |

=== Harpurhey ===
Harpurhey
| Party | Candidate | Votes | % | ±% |
|---|---|---|---|---|
| Labour | A. O'Toole* | 1,686 | 53.7 | −7.5 |
| Conservative | A. Jones | 1,456 | 46.3 | +7.5 |
| Majority | | 230 | 7.4 | −15.0 |
| Turnout | | 3,142 | | |
| Labour hold | | Swing | | |

=== Hugh Oldham ===
Hugh Oldham
| Party | Candidate | Votes | % | ±% |
|---|---|---|---|---|
| Labour | S. Humphries* | 1,665 | 69.8 | −5.7 |
| Conservative | L. N. Mallinson | 558 | 23.4 | +5.5 |
| Communist | E. Cohen | 161 | 6.8 | +0.2 |
| Majority | | 1,107 | 46.4 | −11.2 |
| Turnout | | 2,384 | | |
| Labour hold | | Swing | | |

=== Levenshulme ===
Levenshulme
| Party | Candidate | Votes | % | ±% |
|---|---|---|---|---|
| Conservative | O. Lodge* | 1,980 | 40.3 | −7.3 |
| Ratepayers | J. A. Gannon | 1,633 | 33.2 | N/A |
| Labour | A. E. Bowden | 656 | 13.3 | −14.3 |
| Liberal | J. Berisford | 646 | 13.1 | −11.7 |
| Majority | | 347 | 7.1 | −12.9 |
| Turnout | | 4,915 | | |
| Conservative hold | | Swing | | |

=== Lightbowne ===
Lightbowne
| Party | Candidate | Votes | % | ±% |
|---|---|---|---|---|
| Conservative | A. Tetlow | 2,766 | 47.0 | +0.1 |
| Labour | G. Halstead* | 2,122 | 36.0 | −1.1 |
| Liberal | E. Platt | 1,001 | 17.0 | +1.0 |
| Majority | | 644 | 11.0 | +1.2 |
| Turnout | | 5,889 | | |
| Conservative gain from Labour | | Swing | | |

=== Longsight ===
Longsight
| Party | Candidate | Votes | % | ±% |
|---|---|---|---|---|
| Conservative | F. J. Dunn* | 1,681 | 40.2 | −20.4 |
| Ratepayers | A. H. Burlin | 1,459 | 34.9 | N/A |
| Labour | R. E. Talbot | 1,043 | 24.9 | −14.5 |
| Majority | | 222 | 5.3 | −15.9 |
| Turnout | | 4,183 | | |
| Conservative hold | | Swing | | |

=== Miles Platting ===
Miles Platting
| Party | Candidate | Votes | % | ±% |
|---|---|---|---|---|
| Labour | E. V. Hughes | 1,288 | 57.3 | −9.7 |
| Conservative | J. D. Cheetham | 960 | 42.7 | +9.7 |
| Majority | | 328 | 14.6 | −19.4 |
| Turnout | | 2,248 | | |
| Labour hold | | Swing | | |

=== Moss Side East ===
Moss Side East
| Party | Candidate | Votes | % | ±% |
|---|---|---|---|---|
| Conservative | J. Lang | 1,343 | 39.2 | −3.9 |
| Labour | E. Dell* | 1,290 | 37.7 | −15.7 |
| Ratepayers | J. E. Pheasey | 724 | 21.1 | N/A |
| Communist | T. J. Wright | 66 | 1.9 | −1.6 |
| Majority | | 53 | 1.5 | |
| Turnout | | 3,423 | | |
| Conservative gain from Labour | | Swing | | |

=== Moss Side West ===
Moss Side West
| Party | Candidate | Votes | % | ±% |
|---|---|---|---|---|
| Conservative | W. H. Cox | 1,974 | 55.3 | −3.7 |
| Labour | W. Gallacher | 936 | 26.2 | −12.0 |
| Ratepayers | L. J. Howard | 568 | 15.9 | N/A |
| Union Movement | G. A. Webb | 89 | 2.5 | −0.1 |
| Majority | | 1,038 | 29.1 | +8.3 |
| Turnout | | 3,567 | | |
| Conservative hold | | Swing | | |

=== Moston ===
Moston
| Party | Candidate | Votes | % | ±% |
|---|---|---|---|---|
| Conservative | B. H. Farron | 2,993 | 45.7 | +3.7 |
| Labour | R. Latham* | 2,765 | 42.2 | +1.0 |
| Liberal | P. L. Marron | 796 | 12.1 | −4.7 |
| Majority | | 228 | 3.5 | +2.7 |
| Turnout | | 6,554 | | |
| Conservative gain from Labour | | Swing | | |

=== New Cross ===
New Cross
| Party | Candidate | Votes | % | ±% |
|---|---|---|---|---|
| Labour | E. Crank* | 886 | 70.7 | −5.3 |
| Conservative | F. Hargreaves | 368 | 29.3 | +5.3 |
| Majority | | 518 | 41.4 | −10.6 |
| Turnout | | 1,254 | | |
| Labour hold | | Swing | | |

=== Newton Heath ===
Newton Heath
| Party | Candidate | Votes | % | ±% |
|---|---|---|---|---|
| Labour | W. Binns* | 1,829 | 53.7 | −4.5 |
| Conservative | R. Thorpe | 1,580 | 46.3 | +4.5 |
| Majority | | 249 | 7.4 | −9.0 |
| Turnout | | 3,409 | | |
| Labour hold | | Swing | | |

=== Northenden ===
Northenden
| Party | Candidate | Votes | % | ±% |
|---|---|---|---|---|
| Conservative | H. Tucker | 3,241 | 43.4 | +3.8 |
| Labour | R. E. Sheldon | 2,743 | 36.7 | −2.3 |
| Liberal | R. H. Hargreaves | 1,489 | 19.9 | −1.5 |
| Majority | | 498 | 6.7 | +6.1 |
| Turnout | | 7,473 | | |
| Conservative gain from Labour | | Swing | | |

=== Old Moat ===
Old Moat
| Party | Candidate | Votes | % | ±% |
|---|---|---|---|---|
| Conservative | H. Boff | 1,652 | 52.0 | +1.0 |
| Liberal | T. Kay | 994 | 31.3 | +9.9 |
| Labour | F. Vince | 533 | 16.8 | −10.8 |
| Majority | | 658 | 20.7 | −2.7 |
| Turnout | | 3,179 | | |
| Conservative hold | | Swing | | |

=== Openshaw ===
Openshaw
| Party | Candidate | Votes | % | ±% |
|---|---|---|---|---|
| Labour | S. Jolly* | 2,428 | 63.8 | −4.8 |
| Conservative | B. Moore | 1,264 | 33.2 | +5.1 |
| Communist | N. Gilroy | 112 | 3.0 | −0.3 |
| Majority | | 1,164 | 30.6 | −9.9 |
| Turnout | | 3,804 | | |
| Labour hold | | Swing | | |

=== Rusholme ===
Rusholme
| Party | Candidate | Votes | % | ±% |
|---|---|---|---|---|
| Conservative | A. T. Barratt* | 2,284 | 51.1 | −18.9 |
| Labour | J. S. Goldstone | 953 | 21.3 | −8.7 |
| Ratepayers | J. B. Mathers | 818 | 18.3 | N/A |
| Liberal | F. N. Wedlock | 412 | 9.2 | N/A |
| Majority | | 1,331 | 29.8 | −10.2 |
| Turnout | | 4,467 | | |
| Conservative hold | | Swing | | |

=== St. George's ===
St. George's
| Party | Candidate | Votes | % | ±% |
|---|---|---|---|---|
| Labour | K. Collis* | 1,572 | 68.0 | −7.2 |
| Conservative | S. Alexander | 741 | 32.0 | +7.2 |
| Majority | | 831 | 36.0 | −14.4 |
| Turnout | | 2,313 | | |
| Labour hold | | Swing | | |

=== St. Luke's ===
St. Luke's
| Party | Candidate | Votes | % | ±% |
|---|---|---|---|---|
| Conservative | W. Crabtree | 1,313 | 43.9 | +0.9 |
| Labour | D. A. Warby | 1,258 | 42.1 | −8.1 |
| Ratepayers | N. Robinson | 418 | 14.0 | N/A |
| Majority | | 55 | 1.8 | |
| Turnout | | 2,989 | | |
| Conservative gain from Labour | | Swing | | |

=== St. Mark's ===
St. Mark's
| Party | Candidate | Votes | % | ±% |
|---|---|---|---|---|
| Labour | B. Conlan* | 1,809 | 64.8 | −4.9 |
| Conservative | W. H. Fleetwood | 983 | 35.2 | +4.9 |
| Majority | | 826 | 29.6 | −7.8 |
| Turnout | | 2,792 | | |
| Labour hold | | Swing | | |

=== St. Peter's ===
St. Peter's
| Party | Candidate | Votes | % | ±% |
|---|---|---|---|---|
| Conservative | N. Beer* | 1,267 | 70.7 | +3.5 |
| Labour | P. Kelly | 525 | 29.3 | −3.5 |
| Majority | | 742 | 41.4 | +7.0 |
| Turnout | | 1,792 | | |
| Conservative hold | | Swing | | |

=== Withington ===
Withington
| Party | Candidate | Votes | % | ±% |
|---|---|---|---|---|
| Conservative | E. R. Coker | 2,504 | 55.4 | +0.4 |
| Liberal | A. Share | 1,631 | 36.1 | +2.4 |
| Labour | J. Platt | 386 | 8.5 | −2.8 |
| Majority | | 873 | 19.3 | −2.0 |
| Turnout | | 4,521 | | |
| Conservative hold | | Swing | | |

=== Woodhouse Park ===
Woodhouse Park
| Party | Candidate | Votes | % | ±% |
|---|---|---|---|---|
| Labour | C. H. Hall* | 2,324 | 55.8 | −11.2 |
| Conservative | A. Thurston | 992 | 23.8 | −6.3 |
| Liberal | T. A. Maher | 682 | 16.4 | N/A |
| Communist | E. Holt | 169 | 4.1 | +1.2 |
| Majority | | 1,332 | 32.0 | −4.9 |
| Turnout | | 4,167 | | |
| Labour hold | | Swing | | |

== Aldermanic elections ==
=== Aldermanic election, 6 July 1960 ===
Caused by the death on 17 June 1960 of Alderman Wright Robinson (Labour, elected as an alderman by the council on 1 April 1936).

In his place, Councillor Wilfred Pegge (Conservative, Barlow Moor, elected 22 July 1937) was elected as an alderman by the council on 6 July 1960.

| Party | Alderman | Ward | Term expires |
|---|---|---|---|
| Conservative | Wilfred Pegge | Blackley | 1961 |

=== Aldermanic election, 1 February 1961 ===
Caused by the death on 21 January 1961 of Alderman Hannah Baldwin (Labour, elected as an alderman by the council on 6 July 1955).

In his place, Councillor Albert Barratt (Conservative, Rusholme, elected 21 October 1937) was elected as an alderman by the council on 1 February 1961.

| Party | Alderman | Ward | Term expires |
|---|---|---|---|
| Conservative | Albert Barratt | Withington | 1961 |

=== Aldermanic election, 5 April 1961 ===
Caused by the resignation on 9 March 1961 of Alderman William Collingson (Labour, elected as an alderman by the council on 2 December 1952).

In his place, Councillor H. P. J. Hinderer (Labour, Harpurhey, elected 1 November 1945) was elected as an alderman by the council on 5 April 1961.

| Party | Alderman | Ward | Term expires |
|---|---|---|---|
| Labour | H. P. J. Hinderer | Beswick | 1961 |

== By-elections between 1960 and 1961 ==
=== By-elections, 18 August 1960 ===
Two by-elections were held on 18 August 1960 to fill vacancies which had arisen in the city council.

==== Barlow Moor ====
Caused by the election as an alderman of Councillor Wilfred Pegge (Conservative, Barlow Moor, elected 22 July 1937) on 6 July 1960, following the death on 17 June 1960 of Alderman Wright Robinson (Labour, elected as an alderman by the council on 1 April 1936).

Barlow Moor
| Party | Candidate | Votes | % | ±% |
|---|---|---|---|---|
| Conservative | J. P. Cox | 1,550 | 49.7 | −5.5 |
| Liberal | J. Cunningham | 1,106 | 35.5 | +10.4 |
| Labour | P. Potts | 460 | 14.8 | −4.8 |
| Majority | | 444 | 14.2 | −15.9 |
| Turnout | | 3,116 | | |
| Conservative hold | | Swing | | |

==== Bradford ====
Caused by the resignation of Councillor George McCall (Labour, Braford, elected 7 May 1953) on 19 May 1960.

Bradford
| Party | Candidate | Votes | % | ±% |
|---|---|---|---|---|
| Labour | J. E. Jackson | 1,513 | 62.8 | −4.7 |
| Conservative | H. J. Caulfield | 897 | 37.2 | +4.7 |
| Majority | | 616 | 25.6 | −9.4 |
| Turnout | | 2,410 | | |
| Labour hold | | Swing | | |

=== Rusholme, 9 March 1961 ===
Caused by the election as an alderman of Councillor Albert Barratt (Conservative, Rusholme, elected 21 October 1937) on 1 February 1961, following the death on 21 January 1961 of Alderman Hannah Baldwin (Labour, elected as an alderman by the council on 6 July 1955).

Rusholme
| Party | Candidate | Votes | % | ±% |
|---|---|---|---|---|
| Conservative | F. W. Harrison | 1,710 | 60.7 | +9.6 |
| Liberal | F. N. Wedlock | 594 | 21.1 | +11.9 |
| Labour | G. Berry | 515 | 18.3 | −3.0 |
| Majority | | 1,116 | 39.6 | +9.8 |
| Turnout | | 2,819 | | |
| Conservative hold | | Swing | | |
