= 1973 Manchester City Council election =

1973 UK local government election

- 10 May 1973

99 of 99 seats to Manchester City Council 50 seats needed for a majority
	First party	Second party
Leader	Joe Dean	Robert Rodgers
Party	Labour	Conservative
Leader's seat	Beswick	Alexandra
Last election	20 seats, 51.8%	13 seats, 44.6%
Seats before	100	32
Seats won	59	40
Seats after	59	40
Seat change	▼15	▲15
Popular vote	145,798	141,541
Percentage	47.2%	45.9%
Swing	▼4.6%	▲1.6%
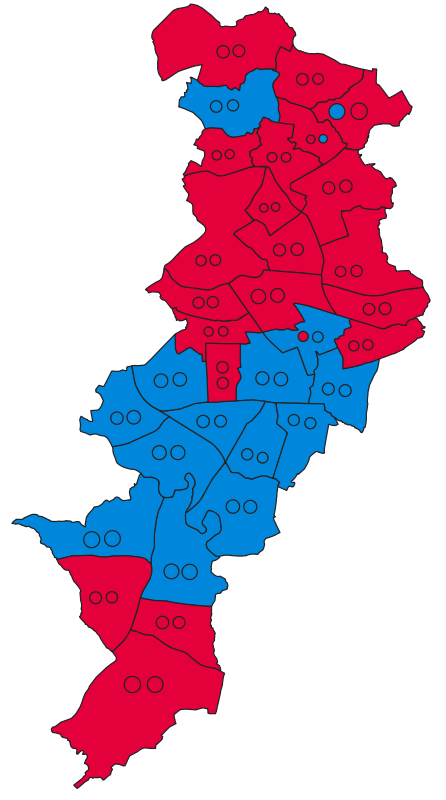
- Map of results of 1973 election
Leader of the Council before election
Labour
Leader of the Council after election
Joe Dean
Labour

Elections to the Manchester City Council were held on Thursday, 10 May 1973. Due to the Local Government Act 1972, which replaced the city corporation with a metropolitan borough, all 99 councillors seats were up for election. In all wards, each first-placed candidate was set to serve a five-year term, expiring in 1978, second-placed candidates were set to serve a three-year term, expiring in 1976, and third-placed candidates were to serve a two-year term, expiring in 1975.

The Labour Party retained overall control of the council.

== Election result ==
Party	Votes		Seats		
Labour Party	145,798 (47.2%)	▼4.6	59 (59.6%)	59 / 99	▼15
Conservative Party	141,541 (45.9%)	▲1.3	40 (40.4%)	40 / 99	▲15
Liberal Party	14,037 (4.5%)	▲1.8	0 (0.0%)	0 / 99	Steady
Residents	4,449 (1.4%)	▲1.3	0 (0.0%)	0 / 99	Steady
Communist	1,094 (0.4%)	▼0.1	0 (0.0%)	0 / 99	Steady
Independent Liberal	865 (0.3%)	N/A	0 (0.0%)	0 / 99	N/A
Independent	539 (0.2%)	Steady	0 (0.0%)	0 / 99	Steady
Anti-Immigration	368 (0.1%)	N/A	0 (0.0%)	0 / 99	N/A

↓
59	40

== Ward results ==
=== Alexandra ===
Alexandra
Party	Candidate	Votes	%	±%
Conservative	M. Flynn*	2,298	50.8	−20.5
Conservative	N. Thompson*	2,236	49.4	−21.9
Conservative	R. C. Rodgers*	2,163	47.8	−23.5
Liberal	D. Hewitt	1,625	35.9	N/A
Liberal	P. Davis	1,532	33.8	N/A
Liberal	C. G. Sinclair	1,444	31.9	N/A
Labour	J. M. Bradley	568	12.5	−16.2
Labour	J. H. Parish	529	11.7	−17.0
Labour	P. J. Salts	513	11.3	−17.4
Majority		538	11.9	−30.7
Turnout		4,528		
Conservative hold		Swing		
Conservative hold		Swing		
Conservative hold		Swing		

=== Ardwick ===
Ardwick
Party	Candidate	Votes	%	±%
Labour	H. Barrett*	1,537	75.6	−2.6
Labour	F. Dale*	1,472	72.4	−5.8
Labour	N. I. Finley*	1,456	71.7	−6.5
Conservative	J. Kershaw	420	20.7	+2.6
Conservative	S. M. Lindsay	393	19.3	+1.2
Conservative	D. H. G. Penney	346	17.0	−1.1
Majority		1,036	51.0	−9.1
Turnout		2,032		
Labour hold		Swing		
Labour hold		Swing		
Labour hold		Swing		

=== Baguley ===
Baguley
Party	Candidate	Votes	%	±%
Labour	F. H. Price*	2,458	53.9	−0.9
Labour	A. P. Marino*	2,349	51.5	−4.9
Labour	C. R. Muir*	2,331	51.1	−5.3
Conservative	M. Malbon	2,025	44.4	+0.8
Conservative	E. J. Whelan	1,983	43.5	−0.1
Conservative	B. H. Farrow	1,853	40.6	−3.0
Majority		306	6.7	−6.1
Turnout		4,561		
Labour hold		Swing		
Labour hold		Swing		
Labour hold		Swing		

=== Barlow Moor ===
Barlow Moor
Party	Candidate	Votes	%	±%
Conservative	H. Tucker*	1,968	60.5	+11.0
Conservative	B. Moore	1,611	49.5	0
Conservative	N. Wood	1,566	48.1	−1.4
Labour	R. Grainger*	1,131	34.7	−3.1
Labour	D. A. Parker*	1,047	32.2	−5.6
Labour	A. J. Bateman*	1,004	30.8	−7.0
Liberal	D. R. Mellor	735	22.6	+9.9
Majority		435	13.4	+1.6
Turnout		3,255		
Conservative hold		Swing		
Conservative gain from Labour		Swing		
Conservative gain from Labour		Swing		

=== Beswick ===
Beswick
Party	Candidate	Votes	%	±%
Labour	J. Dean*	1,528	80.6	−8.6
Labour	S. Corless*	1,514	79.9	−9.6
Labour	K. Eastham*	1,485	78.3	−11.2
Conservative	J. C. J. Cavill	252	13.3	+2.8
Conservative	J. Cartland	238	12.6	+2.1
Conservative	W. Whitmore	235	12.4	+1.9
Majority		1,233	65.0	−14.0
Turnout		1,896		
Labour hold		Swing		
Labour hold		Swing		
Labour hold		Swing		

=== Blackley ===
Blackley
Party	Candidate	Votes	%	±%
Labour	J. I. Owen*	1,859	56.2	−3.8
Labour	A. A. Johnson*	1,850	56.0	−4.0
Labour	F. Hatton*	1,740	52.6	−7.4
Conservative	J. Yates	1,380	41.8	+1.8
Conservative	D. G. Sparrow	1,350	40.8	+0.8
Conservative	H. P. Cummins	1,228	37.2	−2.8
Majority		360	10.9	−9.1
Turnout		3,305		
Labour hold		Swing		
Labour hold		Swing		
Labour hold		Swing		

=== Bradford ===
Bradford
Party	Candidate	Votes	%	±%
Labour	J. Gilmore*	2,271	62.3	−1.8
Labour	W. Egerton*	2,230	61.1	−3.0
Labour	E. Grant	2,100	57.6	−6.5
Conservative	C. R. Ashton	1,239	34.0	−1.9
Conservative	H. Pickles	1,169	32.0	−3.9
Conservative	G. M. Farmer	1,161	31.8	−4.1
Majority		861	23.6	−4.6
Turnout		3,648		
Labour hold		Swing		
Labour hold		Swing		
Labour hold		Swing		

=== Brooklands ===
Brooklands
Party	Candidate	Votes	%	±%
Conservative	Y. Emery*	2,592	54.1	+1.7
Conservative	G. W. G. Fitzsimons	2,548	53.1	+0.7
Conservative	A. A. O'Connor	2,509	52.3	−0.1
Labour	F. Firth*	2,067	43.1	−4.5
Labour	D. Healey*	2,054	42.8	−4.8
Labour	E. Mellor	2,025	42.2	−5.4
Majority		442	9.2	+4.4
Turnout		4,795		
Conservative hold		Swing		
Conservative gain from Labour		Swing		
Conservative gain from Labour		Swing		

=== Burnage ===
Burnage
Party	Candidate	Votes	%	±%
Conservative	L. Howarth*	2,487	61.8	−1.6
Conservative	W. L. Lund*	2,477	61.6	−1.8
Conservative	H. Platt*	2,455	61.0	−2.4
Labour	A. Burns	1,367	34.0	−2.6
Labour	J. McKinnon	1,347	33.5	−3.1
Labour	L. R. Williams	1,328	33.0	−3.6
Majority		1,088	27.1	+0.3
Turnout		4,022		
Conservative hold		Swing		
Conservative hold		Swing		
Conservative hold		Swing		

=== Charlestown ===
Charlestown
Party	Candidate	Votes	%	±%
Labour	L. Kelly*	1,720	59.8	+1.7
Labour	N. Morris*	1,660	57.7	−0.4
Labour	S. C. Silverman*	1,609	55.9	−2.2
Conservative	D. F. Silverman	1,166	40.5	+0.6
Conservative	N. Green	1,120	38.9	−1.0
Conservative	A. E. Cleworth	1,052	36.6	−3.3
Majority		443	15.4	−2.8
Turnout		2,876		
Labour hold		Swing		
Labour hold		Swing		
Labour hold		Swing		

=== Cheetham ===
Cheetham
Party	Candidate	Votes	%	±%
Labour	J. Broderick*	1,182	65.5	+1.0
Labour	D. G. Ford*	1,158	64.2	−0.3
Labour	S. V. Shaw*	1,101	61.0	−3.5
Conservative	J. Bonsu	561	31.1	−4.4
Conservative	K. A. Hunt	561	31.1	−4.4
Conservative	R. A. Price	521	28.9	−6.6
Majority		540	29.9	+0.9
Turnout		1,804		
Labour hold		Swing		
Labour hold		Swing		
Labour hold		Swing		

=== Chorlton ===
Chorlton
Party	Candidate	Votes	%	±%
Conservative	L. Sanders*	2,109	53.7	−15.3
Conservative	M. A. Vince*	2,078	52.9	−16.1
Conservative	A. D. Ashley	1,842	46.9	−22.1
Liberal	C. H. Hughes	979	24.9	N/A
Liberal	M. Calder	977	24.9	N/A
Liberal	W. S. Kenyon	974	24.8	N/A
Labour	V. Stevens	878	22.4	−8.6
Labour	G. Collins	704	17.9	−13.1
Labour	K. Hull	660	16.8	−14.2
Majority		863	22.0	−16.0
Turnout		3,926		
Conservative hold		Swing		
Conservative hold		Swing		
Conservative hold		Swing		

=== Collegiate Church ===
Collegiate Church
Party	Candidate	Votes	%	±%
Labour	F. J. Balcombe*	721	72.2	−12.4
Labour	S. Ogden*	618	61.9	−22.7
Labour	J. B. Ogden*	612	61.3	−23.3
Liberal	J. Laslett	193	19.3	N/A
Liberal	C. Addison	171	17.1	N/A
Conservative	J. Carson	147	14.7	−0.7
Conservative	J. R. Cawley	132	13.2	−2.2
Conservative	W. Porter	116	11.6	−3.8
Majority		419	42.0	−27.2
Turnout		1,061	21.7	
Labour hold		Swing		
Labour hold		Swing		
Labour hold		Swing		

=== Crossacres ===
Crossacres
Party	Candidate	Votes	%	±%
Labour	R. L. Griffiths*	2,461	54.6	−13.8
Labour	A. Roberts	2,353	52.2	−16.2
Labour	K. Collis*	2,269	50.4	−18.0
Residents	R. R. Dilworth	1,271	28.2	N/A
Residents	K. A. Edis	1,267	28.1	N/A
Residents	W. A. McCall	1,251	27.8	N/A
Conservative	W. Foster	756	16.8	−12.1
Conservative	K. Nolan	745	16.5	−12.4
Conservative	G. Scudder	684	15.2	−13.7
Communist	M. Taylor	145	3.2	+0.5
Majority		998	22.2	−17.3
Turnout		4,504		
Labour hold		Swing		
Labour hold		Swing		
Labour hold		Swing		

=== Crumpsall ===
Crumpsall
Party	Candidate	Votes	%	±%
Conservative	G. Fildes	2,027	61.6	+2.2
Conservative	A. Clapham	2,026	61.6	+2.2
Conservative	F. W. Lever	2,022	61.4	+2.0
Labour	A. T. Gray	1,165	35.4	−5.3
Labour	H. Gregory	1,105	33.6	−7.0
Labour	P. A. Sless*	1,082	32.9	−7.7
Majority		857	26.0	+7.2
Turnout		3,291		
Conservative hold		Swing		
Conservative gain from Labour		Swing		
Conservative gain from Labour		Swing		

=== Didsbury ===
Didsbury
Party	Candidate	Votes	%	±%
Conservative	J. B. W. Hill*	3,289	72.6	−1.8
Conservative	J. Duke*	3,233	71.4	−3.0
Conservative	M. R. Crawford*	3,216	71.0	−3.4
Labour	W. Murray	1,036	22.9	−2.7
Labour	R. V. Pierson	976	21.5	−4.1
Labour	D. Cox	959	21.2	−4.4
Communist	A. J. Hunt	230	5.1	N/A
Majority		2,180	48.1	−0.7
Turnout		4,531		
Conservative hold		Swing		
Conservative hold		Swing		
Conservative hold		Swing		

=== Gorton North ===
Gorton North
Party	Candidate	Votes	%	±%
Labour	G. Conquest*	2,070	65.4	−5.2
Labour	C. Brierley*	2,001	63.2	−7.4
Labour	P. Bednarski	1,975	62.4	−8.2
Conservative	J. B. Bullough	1,016	32.1	+5.0
Conservative	W. Slowe	995	31.4	+4.3
Conservative	T. J. S. Duke	983	31.1	+4.0
Majority		959	30.3	−13.2
Turnout		3,165		
Labour hold		Swing		
Labour hold		Swing		
Labour hold		Swing		

=== Gorton South ===
Gorton South
Party	Candidate	Votes	%	±%
Labour	H. Conway*	1,422	55.4	−16.4
Labour	D. Barker*	1,350	52.6	−19.2
Labour	K. Franklin*	1,317	51.3	−20.5
Conservative	E. A. Duffy	760	29.6	+2.9
Conservative	P. T. Heywood	749	29.2	+1.0
Conservative	A. Farmer	734	28.6	+0.4
Residents	D. E. Lindsay	660	25.7	N/A
Majority		557	21.7	−21.9
Turnout		2,566		
Labour hold		Swing		
Labour hold		Swing		
Labour hold		Swing		

=== Harpurhey ===
Harpurhey
Party	Candidate	Votes	%	±%
Labour	K. Litherland*	951	60.7	−1.4
Labour	A. Nicholson*	951	60.7	−1.4
Labour	R. F. Delahunty*	927	59.2	−2.9
Conservative	G. Cleworth	564	36.0	−1.9
Conservative	A. P. Osborn	556	35.5	−2.4
Conservative	M. Withers	532	34.0	−3.9
Majority		363	23.2	−1.0
Turnout		1,566		
Labour hold		Swing		
Labour hold		Swing		
Labour hold		Swing		

=== Hulme ===
Hulme
Party	Candidate	Votes	%	±%
Labour	J. V. Marshall*	1,290	75.7	−13.4
Labour	T. Thomas*	1,273	74.7	−14.4
Labour	W. Smith*	1,226	71.9	−17.2
Conservative	A. Edwards	289	17.0	+6.1
Conservative	R. E. Gilham	260	15.3	+4.4
Conservative	E. Draycott	255	15.0	+4.1
Communist	D. J. Heywood	83	4.9	N/A
Majority		937	55.6	−22.6
Turnout		1,704		
Labour hold		Swing		
Labour hold		Swing		
Labour hold		Swing		

=== Levenshulme ===
Levenshulme
Party	Candidate	Votes	%	±%
Conservative	J. K. Barber*	2,414	58.3	+4.0
Conservative	W. Carlton	2,253	54.4	+0.1
Conservative	S. D. Alexander	2,239	54.0	−0.3
Labour	E. H. Spencer	1,663	40.1	−5.6
Labour	F. Done	1,646	39.7	−6.0
Labour	J. Flanagan	1,597	38.5	−7.2
Majority		576	13.9	+5.3
Turnout		4,144		
Conservative hold		Swing		
Conservative gain from Labour		Swing		
Conservative gain from Labour		Swing		

=== Lightbowne ===
Lightbowne
Party	Candidate	Votes	%	±%
Labour	H. T. Lee*	1,618	36.9	−1.9
Labour	R. A. Reddington*	1,570	35.8	−3.0
Conservative	E. Jones	1,569	35.8	−2.8
Conservative	E. D. Kirkup	1,558	35.5	−3.1
Labour	S. Smith*	1,547	35.3	−3.5
Conservative	D. Porter	1,511	34.5	−4.1
Independent Liberal	I. Lindsay	865	19.7	N/A
Liberal	R. Jackson	765	17.4	−5.2
Liberal	I. Garrard	655	14.9	−7.7
Liberal	G. Garrard	627	14.3	−8.3
Majority		12	0.3	
Turnout		4,385		
Labour hold		Swing		
Labour hold		Swing		
Conservative gain from Labour		Swing		

=== Lloyd Street ===
Lloyd Street
Party	Candidate	Votes	%	±%
Labour	H. Collins	2,128	55.2	+0.6
Labour	K. McKeon*	2,084	54.0	−0.6
Labour	A. S. Wood	1,982	51.4	−3.2
Conservative	J. E. Higham	1,642	42.5	−1.0
Conservative	E. Bevan	1,604	41.6	−3.8
Conservative	L. H. Nield	1,553	40.3	−5.1
Majority		340	8.8	−0.4
Turnout		3,856		
Labour hold		Swing		
Labour hold		Swing		
Labour hold		Swing		

=== Longsight ===
Longsight
Party	Candidate	Votes	%	±%
Conservative	A. Malpas	1,565	48.2	+7.5
Labour	R. W. Ford*	1,454	44.7	−9.7
Conservative	G. Taylor	1,412	43.4	+2.7
Labour	S. N. M. Moxley*	1,392	42.8	−11.6
Conservative	M. Delayen	1,389	42.7	+2.0
Labour	B. Anderson*	1,369	42.1	−12.3
Independent	J. Kedward	160	4.9	+1.5
Majority		20	0.6	
Turnout		3,250		
Conservative gain from Labour		Swing		
Labour hold		Swing		
Conservative gain from Labour		Swing		

=== Miles Platting ===
Miles Platting
Party	Candidate	Votes	%	±%
Labour	E. Crank*	1,240	72.6	−13.1
Labour	R. Latham*	1,209	70.7	−15.0
Labour	E. Donoghue*	1,194	69.9	−15.8
Anti-Immigration	M. R. Goucher	368	21.5	N/A
Conservative	A. Chappell	219	12.8	−1.5
Conservative	H. Lee	214	12.5	−1.8
Conservative	M. Howells	182	10.6	−3.7
Majority		826	48.3	−23.1
Turnout		1,709		
Labour hold		Swing		
Labour hold		Swing		
Labour hold		Swing		

=== Moss Side ===
Moss Side
Party	Candidate	Votes	%	±%
Labour	R. E. Talbot*	928	66.5	−8.5
Labour	H. P. D. Paget*	889	63.7	−11.3
Labour	W. A. Downward*	789	56.6	−18.4
Conservative	M. J. Duffy	515	36.9	+11.9
Conservative	H. W. Meadowcroft	515	36.9	+11.9
Conservative	C. Toft	409	29.3	+4.3
Communist	W. Woolery	90	6.5	N/A
Majority		274	19.6	−30.4
Turnout		1,396		
Labour hold		Swing		
Labour hold		Swing		
Labour hold		Swing		

=== Moston ===
Moston
Party	Candidate	Votes	%	±%
Labour	A. E. Bowden*	2,266	51.3	+10.9
Conservative	K. E. Goulding*	2,207	50.0	+6.1
Labour	C. C. Lamb	2,123	48.1	+7.7
Labour	W. T. Risby*	2,095	47.4	+7.0
Conservative	A. W. Ash	2,041	46.2	+2.3
Conservative	G. I. Jones	1,909	43.2	−0.7
Majority		82	1.9	
Turnout		4,418		
Labour hold		Swing		
Conservative hold		Swing		
Labour hold		Swing		

=== Newton Heath ===
Newton Heath
Party	Candidate	Votes	%	±%
Labour	M. J. Taylor*	1,914	60.1	−2.5
Labour	C. Tomlinson*	1,902	59.7	−2.9
Labour	J. Smith*	1,826	57.3	−5.3
Conservative	A. E. Walsh	1,148	36.0	−1.4
Conservative	A. R. Leeke	1,080	33.9	−3.5
Conservative	T. B. Hegarty	1,060	33.3	−4.1
Majority		678	21.3	−3.9
Turnout		3,184		
Labour hold		Swing		
Labour hold		Swing		
Labour hold		Swing		

=== Northenden ===
Northenden
Party	Candidate	Votes	%	±%
Conservative	G. Leigh*	2,978	56.5	+4.9
Conservative	C. H. Box	2,737	51.9	+0.3
Conservative	D. Mountford	2,730	51.8	+0.2
Labour	H. Brown	2,244	42.6	−3.5
Labour	H. Reid	2,114	40.1	−6.0
Labour	J. M. Wilson*	2,097	39.8	−6.3
Communist	G. F. Taylor	341	6.5	N/A
Majority		486	9.2	+3.7
Turnout		5,273		
Conservative hold		Swing		
Conservative gain from Labour		Swing		
Conservative gain from Labour		Swing		

=== Old Moat ===
Old Moat
Party	Candidate	Votes	%	±%
Conservative	T. F. Lavin*	2,479	62.8	+7.7
Conservative	D. G. Massey	2,319	58.7	+3.6
Conservative	T. E. Murphy	2,262	57.3	+2.2
Labour	E. Richards	1,395	35.3	−9.6
Labour	A. J. Spencer*	1,392	35.2	−9.7
Labour	A. E. Jones	1,368	34.6	−10.3
Majority		867	21.9	+11.7
Turnout		3,950		
Conservative hold		Swing		
Conservative gain from Labour		Swing		
Conservative gain from Labour		Swing		

=== Rusholme ===
Rusholme
Party	Candidate	Votes	%	±%
Conservative	M. Pierce*	2,221	61.8	+0.8
Conservative	K. Ollerenshaw*	2,191	61.0	0
Conservative	S. Tucker*	2,173	60.5	−0.5
Labour	A. H. Fender	1,115	31.0	−2.9
Labour	M. A. Naqui*	1,091	30.4	−3.5
Labour	H. Rowley	1,090	30.3	−3.6
Independent	F. A. Melling	379	10.5	+7.7
Majority		1,058	29.4	+2.3
Turnout		3,594		
Conservative hold		Swing		
Conservative hold		Swing		
Conservative hold		Swing		

=== Withington ===
Withington
Party	Candidate	Votes	%	±%
Conservative	E. R. Coker*	1,864	47.9	−0.4
Conservative	G. W. Young*	1,801	46.3	−2.0
Conservative	W. Crabtree*	1,793	46.1	−2.2
Liberal	J. Edwards	1,151	29.6	+4.4
Liberal	R. A. Bell	1,107	28.5	+3.3
Liberal	W. J. Ellwood	1,102	28.3	+3.1
Labour	J. Wilner	858	22.1	−4.4
Labour	M. Moss	855	22.0	−4.5
Labour	R. Ames	797	20.5	−6.0
Majority		642	16.5	+8.7
Turnout		3,889		
Conservative hold		Swing		
Conservative hold		Swing		
Conservative hold		Swing		

=== Woodhouse Park ===
Woodhouse Park
Party	Candidate	Votes	%	±%
Labour	G. Hall*	1,721	62.0	−6.0
Labour	T. Farrell*	1,678	60.4	−7.6
Labour	G. Berry	1,616	58.2	−9.8
Conservative	J. A. Graham	856	30.8	+1.2
Conservative	G. Parry	849	30.6	+1.0
Conservative	F. Kennan	802	28.9	−0.7
Communist	J. V. Hamer	205	7.4	+5.0
Majority		760	27.4	−11.0
Turnout		2,776		
Labour hold		Swing		
Labour hold		Swing		
Labour hold		Swing		

== By-elections between 1973 and 1975 ==
=== By-elections, 27 June 1974 ===
Two by-elections were held on 27 June 1974 to fill vacancies which had arisen in the city council.

==== Beswick ====
Caused by the resignation of Councillor Joe Dean M.P. (Labour, Beswick, elected 12 May 1960) on 23 May 1974.

Beswick
Party	Candidate	Votes	%	±%
Labour	J. E. Jackson	1,298	70.9	−14.9
Liberal	W. J. Ellwood	248	13.6	+13.6
Conservative	D. Porter	173	9.5	−4.6
National Front	S. McKenzie	111	6.1	+6.1
Majority		1,050	57.4	−14.3
Turnout		1,830		
Labour hold		Swing	-14.2	

==== Blackley ====
Caused by the death of Councillor Arthur Johnson (Labour, Blackley, elected 13 May 1971) on 9 May 1974, and by the resignation of Councillor Frank Hatton M.P. (Labour, Blackley, elected 13 May 1954) on 23 May 1974.

Blackley
Party	Candidate	Votes	%	±%
Labour	B. Risby	1,975	54.5	−2.9
Labour	S. Smith	1,908		
Conservative	J. Hood	1,354	37.4	−5.2
Conservative	P. Cummins	1,340		
Liberal	C. Cloran	292	8.0	+8.0
Liberal	J. Laslett	282		
Majority		554	17.1	+2.3
Turnout		3,621		
Labour hold		Swing		
Labour hold		Swing	+1.1	

=== Harpurhey, 25 July 1974 ===
Caused by the death of Councillor Andrew Nicholson (Labour, Harpurhey, elected 7 March 1963) on 26 June 1974.

Harpurhey
Party	Candidate	Votes	%	±%
Labour	H. Reid	1,119	62.6	−0.2
Conservative	D. Porter	343	19.2	−18.0
Liberal	R. Addison	325	18.2	+18.2
Majority		776	43.4	+17.9
Turnout		1,787		
Labour hold		Swing	+8.9	
