= 1979 Manchester City Council election =

1979 UK local government election

- 3 May 1979

33 of 99 seats to Manchester City Council 50 seats needed for a majority
	First party	Second party	Third party
Leader	Norman Morris	Cecil Franks	Audrey Jones
Party	Labour	Conservative	Liberal
Leader's seat	Charlestown	Chorlton	Withington
Last election	19 seats, 47.8%	14 seats, 45.3%	0 seats, 5.9%
Seats before	53	45	1
Seats won	25	6	2
Seats after	63	33	3
Seat change	▲10	▼12	▲2
Popular vote	118,345	87,695	26,208
Percentage	50.7%	37.6%	11.2%
Swing	▲2.9%	▼7.7%	▲5.3%
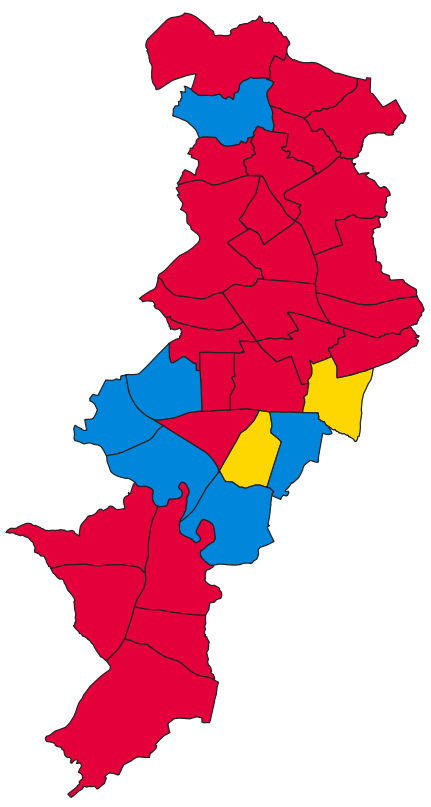
- Map of results of 1979 election
Leader of the Council before election
Norman Morris
Labour
Leader of the Council after election
Norman Morris
Labour

Elections to Manchester City Council were held on Thursday, 3 May 1979, on the same day as the 1979 UK general election. One third of the council was up for election, with each successful candidate to serve a three-year term of office, expiring in 1982, due to the boundary changes and "all-out" elections due to take place that year. The Labour Party retained overall control of the council.

== Election result ==
Party	Votes		Seats			Full Council	
Labour Party	118,345 (50.7%)	▲2.9	25 (75.8%)	25 / 33	▲10	63 (63.7%)	63 / 99
Conservative Party	87,695 (37.6%)	▼7.7	6 (18.2%)	6 / 33	▼12	33 (33.3%)	33 / 99
Liberal Party	26,208 (11.2%)	▲5.3	2 (6.1%)	2 / 33	▲2	3 (3.0%)	3 / 99
Ecology	641 (0.3%)	N/A	0 (0.0%)	0 / 33	N/A	0 (0.0%)	0 / 99
Communist	278 (0.1%)	▼0.1	0 (0.0%)	0 / 33	Steady	0 (0.0%)	0 / 99
Independent	164 (0.1%)	N/A	0 (0.0%)	0 / 33	N/A	0 (0.0%)	0 / 99

↓
63	3	33

== Ward results ==
=== Alexandra ===
Alexandra
Party	Candidate	Votes	%	±%
Conservative	R. C. Rodgers*	4,864	58.8	−1.1
Labour	J. Cocker	3,403	41.2	+15.4
Majority		1,461	17.7	−16.4
Turnout		8,267	72.3	+34.7
Conservative hold		Swing		

=== Ardwick ===
Ardwick
Party	Candidate	Votes	%	±%
Labour	N. I. Finley*	2,289	58.5	−12.0
Conservative	W. R. Swan	1,310	33.5	+7.2
Liberal	J. Spittle	315	8.0	+4.8
Majority		979	25.0	−19.2
Turnout		3,914	62.3	+34.6
Labour hold		Swing	-9.6	

=== Baguley ===
Baguley
Party	Candidate	Votes	%	±%
Labour	K. Robinson	5,412	54.5	−1.9
Conservative	M. Malbon*	3,693	37.2	−6.4
Liberal	P. G. Willams	821	8.3	+8.3
Majority		1,719	17.3	+4.6
Turnout		9,926	72.8	+26.7
Labour gain from Conservative		Swing	+2.2	

=== Barlow Moor ===
Barlow Moor
Party	Candidate	Votes	%	±%
Conservative	H. D. Moore*	3,095	45.9	−18.0
Labour	J. H. Parish	2,834	42.0	+5.9
Liberal	J. R. Marsden	815	12.1	+12.1
Majority		261	3.9	−23.9
Turnout		6,744	68.0	+35.6
Conservative hold		Swing	-11.9	

=== Beswick ===
Beswick
Party	Candidate	Votes	%	±%
Labour	K. Eastham*	3,505	81.5	+4.2
Conservative	C. Hare	796	18.5	+2.1
Majority		2,709	63.0	+2.1
Turnout		4,301	61.2	+33.5
Labour hold		Swing	+1.0	

=== Blackley ===
Blackley
Party	Candidate	Votes	%	±%
Labour	Eddie Newman	3,936	48.3	+3.7
Conservative	H. P. Cummins*	3,571	43.8	−8.4
Liberal	J. Ashley	643	7.9	+4.7
Majority		365	4.5	−3.1
Turnout		8,150	74.8	+31.6
Labour gain from Conservative		Swing	+6.0	

=== Bradford ===
Bradford
Party	Candidate	Votes	%	±%
Labour	E. Grant*	5,127	63.9	+5.1
Conservative	L. Hockey	2,459	30.6	−6.0
Liberal	P. Hanmer	440	5.5	+5.5
Majority		2,668	33.2	+10.9
Turnout		8,026	69.7	+36.4
Labour hold		Swing	+5.5	

=== Brooklands ===
Brooklands
Party	Candidate	Votes	%	±%
Labour	D. Healey	4,554	48.1	+4.9
Conservative	D. Sumberg	4,136	43.7	−13.1
Liberal	A. L. Algar	777	8.2	+8.2
Majority		418	4.4	−9.3
Turnout		9,467	74.9	+34.1
Labour gain from Conservative		Swing	+9.0	

=== Burnage ===
Burnage
Party	Candidate	Votes	%	±%
Conservative	H. Platt*	3,872	46.3	−14.3
Labour	A. Lister	3,604	43.1	+3.7
Liberal	G. Shaw	885	10.6	+10.6
Majority		268	3.2	−18.5
Turnout		8,361	74.6	+37.0
Conservative hold		Swing	-9.0	

=== Charlestown ===
Charlestown
Party	Candidate	Votes	%	±%
Labour	G. Stringer	3,802	51.2	+2.8
Conservative	J. Hood*	2,974	40.1	−5.1
Liberal	E. V. Roberts	648	8.7	+5.2
Majority		828	11.2	+8.0
Turnout		7,424	76.7	+32.2
Labour gain from Conservative		Swing	+3.9	

=== Cheetham ===
Cheetham
Party	Candidate	Votes	%	±%
Labour	S. Shaw*	3,014	66.1	−0.5
Conservative	F. Meaden	1,294	28.4	−5.0
Liberal	S. O. Mousah	250	5.5	+5.5
Majority		1,720	37.7	+4.5
Turnout		4,558	65.5	+37.0
Labour hold		Swing	+2.2	

=== Chorlton ===
Chorlton
Party	Candidate	Votes	%	±%
Conservative	C. Franks*	4,244	51.0	−11.0
Labour	H. Brown	2,979	35.8	+4.7
Liberal	J. Commons	1,096	13.2	+6.3
Majority		1,265	15.2	−15.8
Turnout		8,319	75.9	+37.5
Conservative hold		Swing	-7.8	

=== Collegiate Church ===
Collegiate Church
Party	Candidate	Votes	%	±%
Labour	P. Karney	1,531	63.6	+0.5
Conservative	S. R. Newth	666	27.7	−3.4
Liberal	I. Wilde	211	8.8	+3.0
Majority		865	35.9	+4.0
Turnout		2,408	53.8	+25.6
Labour hold		Swing	+1.9	

=== Crossacres ===
Crossacres
Party	Candidate	Votes	%	±%
Labour	Ken Collis*	5,577	60.1	+0.6
Conservative	A. Spencer	2,348	25.3	−4.0
Liberal	H. Griffiths	1,358	14.6	+3.5
Majority		3,229	34.8	+4.6
Turnout		9,283	70.5	+35.2
Labour hold		Swing	+2.3	

=== Crumpsall ===
Crumpsall
Party	Candidate	Votes	%	±%
Conservative	F. W. Lever*	3,615	47.0	−6.9
Labour	M. Harrison	3,287	42.7	+5.2
Liberal	J. Cookson	797	10.4	+3.3
Majority		328	4.3	−12.2
Turnout		7,699	71.5	+36.2
Conservative hold		Swing	-6.0	

=== Didsbury ===
Didsbury
Party	Candidate	Votes	%	±%
Conservative	M. R. Crawford*	5,415	56.4	−11.6
Labour	R. P. Ashby	2,444	25.5	+2.8
Liberal	A. T. Parkinson	1,738	18.1	+8.8
Majority		2,971	31.0	−14.3
Turnout		9,597	76.8	+32.3
Conservative hold		Swing	-7.2	

=== Gorton North ===
Gorton North
Party	Candidate	Votes	%	±%
Labour	P. Hildrew	3,871	63.2	+6.5
Conservative	E. Leadbetter	1,845	30.1	−6.1
Liberal	D. Nicholson	411	6.7	−0.4
Majority		2,026	33.1	+12.6
Turnout		6,127	73.2	+35.5
Labour hold		Swing	+6.3	

=== Gorton South ===
Gorton South
Party	Candidate	Votes	%	±%
Labour	K. Franklin*	3,662	61.1	+5.7
Conservative	D. Heywood	1,905	31.8	−8.4
Liberal	J. Rhodes	429	7.2	+7.2
Majority		1,757	29.3	+14.1
Turnout		5,996	70.9	+37.1
Labour hold		Swing	+7.0	

=== Harpurhey ===
Harpurhey
Party	Candidate	Votes	%	±%
Labour	R. F. Delahunty*	2,802	64.6	+2.1
Conservative	J. Harding	1,270	29.3	−8.2
Liberal	N. Towers	266	6.1	+6.1
Majority		1,532	35.3	+10.3
Turnout		4,338	65.4	+34.5
Labour hold		Swing	+5.1	

=== Hulme ===
Hulme
Party	Candidate	Votes	%	±%
Labour	W. Smith*	3,562	68.6	+11.1
Conservative	N. P. Shand	957	18.4	+3.5
Liberal	S. K. McClure	499	10.6	−3.7
Communist	R. W. Gwilt	174	3.4	+1.3
Majority		2,605	50.2	+12.8
Turnout		5,192	61.6	+32.2
Labour hold		Swing	+3.8	

=== Levenshulme ===
Levenshulme
Party	Candidate	Votes	%	±%
Liberal	Keith Whitmore	3,180	36.6	+14.5
Labour	R. A. Reddington	2,959	34.1	−3.1
Conservative	S. Alexander*	2,544	29.3	−11.4
Majority		221	2.5	−1.0
Turnout		8,683	72.2	+33.8
Liberal gain from Conservative		Swing	+8.8	

=== Lightbowne ===
Lightbowne
Party	Candidate	Votes	%	±%
Labour	P. A. Murphy	4,358	55.2	−0.3
Conservative	V. E. Clare	2,787	35.3	−9.2
Liberal	K. Osbourne	743	9.4	+9.4
Majority		1,571	19.9	+8.9
Turnout		7,888	74.8	+31.8
Labour gain from Conservative		Swing	+4.4	

=== Lloyd Street ===
Lloyd Street
Party	Candidate	Votes	%	±%
Labour	A. S. Wood*	4,449	56.0	+2.8
Conservative	M. L. Davies	2,788	35.1	−6.9
Liberal	M. A. Plesch	540	6.8	+2.0
Independent	A. H. Bradley	164	2.1	+2.1
Majority		1,661	20.9	+9.7
Turnout		7,941	69.3	+33.5
Labour hold		Swing	+4.8	

=== Longsight ===
Longsight
Party	Candidate	Votes	%	±%
Labour	J. M. Wilson	3,837	60.3	+6.2
Conservative	G. Taylor*	1,989	31.3	−9.6
Liberal	M. Amin	534	8.4	+3.4
Majority		1,848	29.1	+9.7
Turnout		6,360	66.8	+32.4
Labour gain from Conservative		Swing	+7.9	

=== Miles Platting ===
Miles Platting
Party	Candidate	Votes	%	±%
Labour	P. Conquest	3,193	76.8	+0.5
Conservative	J. Cartland	737	17.7	−0.4
Liberal	J. A. Turrell	228	5.5	+5.5
Majority		2,456	59.1	+0.9
Turnout		4,158	62.0	+38.0
Labour hold		Swing	+0.4	

=== Moss Side ===
Moss Side
Party	Candidate	Votes	%	±%
Labour	J. Wilner	2,630	67.5	−2.5
Conservative	J. M. Goldsby	888	22.8	+4.1
Liberal	D. Redford	380	9.7	−1.6
Majority		1,742	44.7	−6.5
Turnout		3,898	63.5	+36.3
Labour hold		Swing	-3.3	

=== Moston ===
Moston
Party	Candidate	Votes	%	±%
Labour	C. McClaren	4,179	46.3	+1.5
Conservative	G. I. Jones*	3,958	43.9	−11.3
Liberal	M. Gradwell	881	9.8	+9.8
Majority		221	2.5	−7.9
Turnout		9,018	77.2	+32.7
Labour gain from Conservative		Swing	+6.4	

=== Newton Heath ===
Newton Heath
Party	Candidate	Votes	%	±%
Labour	J. Smith*	4,209	60.4	+3.4
Conservative	D. Booth	2,499	35.9	−7.1
Liberal	V. Towers	258	3.7	+3.7
Majority		1,710	24.5	+10.6
Turnout		6,966	70.4	+31.2
Labour hold		Swing	+5.2	

=== Northenden ===
Northenden
Party	Candidate	Votes	%	±%
Labour	W. J. Courtney	4,106	45.6	+1.8
Conservative	D. Mountford*	3,895	43.3	−3.0
Liberal	P. J. Hughes	893	9.9	+0.0
Communist	J. Gandy	104	1.2	+1.2
Majority		211	2.3	−0.3
Turnout		8,998	75.1	+28.2
Labour gain from Conservative		Swing	+2.4	

=== Old Moat ===
Old Moat
Party	Candidate	Votes	%	±%
Labour	A. Home	2,850	41.4	+1.9
Conservative	T. E. Murphy*	2,735	39.7	−19.0
Liberal	G. J. Corps	1,299	18.9	+18.9
Majority		115	1.7	−17.5
Turnout		6,884	72.5	+33.8
Labour gain from Conservative		Swing	+10.4	

=== Rusholme ===
Rusholme
Party	Candidate	Votes	%	±%
Labour	A. J. Bateman	3,804	42.3	+4.2
Conservative	S. Tucker*	3,685	40.9	−14.1
Liberal	D. Senior	870	9.7	+2.8
Ecology	S. L. Howarth	641	7.1	+7.1
Majority		119	1.3	−15.6
Turnout		9,000	65.8	+36.0
Labour gain from Conservative		Swing	+9.1	

=== Withington ===
Withington
Party	Candidate	Votes	%	±%
Liberal	D. Sandiford	3,116	38.9	+6.7
Conservative	J. M. Jacobs	2,889	36.0	−6.6
Labour	J. Finnegan	2,009	25.1	−0.1
Majority		227	2.8	−7.5
Turnout		8,014	73.3	+34.5
Liberal gain from Conservative		Swing	+6.6	

=== Woodhouse Park ===
Woodhouse Park
Party	Candidate	Votes	%	±%
Labour	G. Berry*	4,567	61.5	−6.0
Conservative	J. C. Ridgard	1,972	26.6	−2.9
Liberal	L. Griffiths	887	11.9	+11.9
Majority		2,595	34.9	−3.1
Turnout		7,426	71.6	+34.3
Labour hold		Swing	-1.5	
