= Baguley (ward) =

- Ward
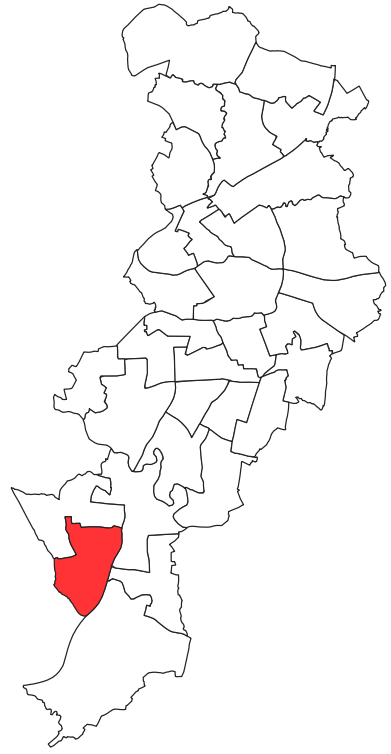
- Baguley ward (2018) within Manchester

- Coat of arms
- Country: United Kingdom
- Constituent country: England
- Region: North West England
- County: Greater Manchester
- Metropolitan borough: Manchester
- Created: May 1954
- Named for: Baguley

Government
  - Type: Unicameral
  - Body: Manchester City Council
- UK Parliamentary Constituency: Wythenshawe and Sale East

Baguley is an electoral division of Manchester City Council which has been represented since 1954. It covers the Baguley area of Wythenshawe.

== Overview ==
Baguley ward was created in 1954, following the City Council's successful application to create two new wards for the Wythenshawe estate. Initially, the ward covered the western portion of the former Wythenshawe ward and the Brooklands area of the Northenden ward. In 1971, that part of the ward to the north of Altrincham Road was transferred to the new Brooklands ward. In 1982, the ward's northern boundary became the Cheshire Lines Railway. A further city-wide boundary revision in 2004, transferred the Roundthorn area to the Brooklands ward. The ward's boundaries were left largely unchanged at the latest revision in 2018.

From its creation until 1997, the ward formed part of the Manchester Wythenshawe Parliamentary constituency. Since 1997, it has formed part of the Wythenshawe and Sale East Parliamentary constituency.

== Councillors ==
Election	Councillor	Councillor	Councillor
1954	J. Stuart-Cole (Lab)	W. Gallacher (Lab)	H. Jenkins (Lab)
1955	J. Stuart-Cole (Lab)	W. Gallacher (Lab)	H. Jenkins (Lab)
1956	J. Stuart-Cole (Lab)	W. Gallacher (Lab)	H. Jenkins (Lab)
1957	J. Stuart-Cole (Lab)	W. Gallacher (Lab)	H. Jenkins (Lab)
1958	J. Stuart-Cole (Lab)	W. Gallacher (Lab)	H. Jenkins (Lab)
1959	J. Stuart-Cole (Lab)	F. H. Price (Lab)	H. Jenkins (Lab)
1960	C. Sanders (Con)	F. H. Price (Lab)	H. Jenkins (Lab)
1961	C. Sanders (Con)	F. H. Price (Lab)	H. Jenkins (Lab)
1962	C. Sanders (Con)	F. H. Price (Lab)	H. Jenkins (Lab)
1963	R. Reddington (Lab)	F. H. Price (Lab)	H. Jenkins (Lab)
1964	R. Reddington (Lab)	F. H. Price (Lab)	H. Lloyd (Lab)
1965	R. Reddington (Lab)	I. K. Paley (Con)	H. Lloyd (Lab)
1966	R. Reddington (Lab)	I. K. Paley (Con)	H. Lloyd (Lab)
1967	R. Reddington (Lab)	I. K. Paley (Con)	T. E. Murphy (Con)
1968	R. Reddington (Lab)	I. K. Paley (Con)	T. E. Murphy (Con)
March 1969	R. Reddington (Lab)	M. Malbon (Con)	T. E. Murphy (Con)
1969	G. I. Woolard (Con)	M. Malbon (Con)	T. E. Murphy (Con)
1970	G. I. Woolard (Con)	M. Malbon (Con)	F. H. Price (Lab)
1971	F. H. Price (Lab)	C. B. Muir (Lab)	H. Brown (Lab)
1972	F. H. Price (Lab)	C. B. Muir (Lab)	H. Brown (Lab)
1973	F. H. Price (Lab)	A. P. Marino (Lab)	C. B. Muir (Lab)
1975	F. H. Price (Lab)	J. V. Oatway (Con)	M. Malbon (Con)
1976	F. H. Price (Lab)	A. Burns (Lab)	M. Malbon (Con)
1978	F. Done (Lab)	A. Burns (Lab)	M. Malbon (Con)
1979	F. Done (Lab)	A. Burns (Lab)	K. Robinson (Lab)
1980	F. Done (Lab)	A. Burns (Lab)	K. Robinson (Lab)
1982	F. Done (Lab)	A. Burns (Lab)	W. Smith (Lab)
1983	F. Done (Lab)	A. Burns (Lab)	W. Smith (Lab)
1984	F. Done (Lab)	A. Burns (Lab)	W. Smith (Lab)
1986	F. Done (Lab)	A. Burns (Lab)	W. Smith (Lab)
1987	F. Done (Lab)	A. Burns (Lab)	W. Smith (Lab)
1988	J. McNicholls (Lab)	A. Burns (Lab)	W. Smith (Lab)
1990	J. McNicholls (Lab)	A. Burns (Lab)	W. Smith (Lab)
1991	J. McNicholls (Lab)	A. Burns (Lab)	W. Smith (Lab)
1992	J. McNicholls (Lab)	A. Burns (Lab)	W. Smith (Lab)
1994	T. Farrell (Lab)	A. Burns (Lab)	W. Smith (Lab)
1995	T. Farrell (Lab)	A. Burns (Lab)	G. Jones (Lab)
1996	T. Farrell (Lab)	A. Burns (Lab)	G. Jones (Lab)
1998	T. Farrell (Lab)	A. Burns (Lab)	G. Jones (Lab)
1999	T. Farrell (Lab)	A. Burns (Lab)	G. Jones (Lab)
2000	T. Farrell (Lab)	A. Burns (Lab)	G. Jones (Lab)
January 2001	T. Farrell (Lab)	A. Burns (Lab)	E. McCulley (Lab)
2002	P. Andrews (Lab)	A. Burns (Lab)	E. McCulley (Lab)
2003	P. Andrews (Lab)	A. Burns (Lab)	E. McCulley (Lab)
2004	Tony Burns (Lab)	Paul Andrews (Lab)	Eddie McCulley (Lab)
2006	Tony Burns (Lab)	Paul Andrews (Lab)	Eddie McCulley (Lab)
2007	Tony Burns (Lab)	Paul Andrews (Lab)	Eddie McCulley (Lab)
2008	Tony Burns (Lab)	Paul Andrews (Lab)	Eddie McCulley (Lab)
2010	Tony Burns (Lab)	Paul Andrews (Lab)	Eddie McCulley (Lab)
January 2011	Tony Burns (Lab)	Paul Andrews (Lab)	Tracey Rawlins (Lab)
2011	Tony Burns (Lab)	Paul Andrews (Lab)	Tracey Rawlins (Lab)
2012	Luke Raikes (Lab)	Paul Andrews (Lab)	Tracey Rawlins (Lab)
2014	Luke Raikes (Lab)	Paul Andrews (Lab)	Tracey Rawlins (Lab)
2015	Luke Raikes (Lab)	Paul Andrews (Lab)	Tracey Rawlins (Lab)
2016	Luke Raikes (Lab)	Paul Andrews (Lab)	Tracey Rawlins (Lab)
2018	Paul Andrews (Lab)	Tracey Rawlins (Lab)	Luke Raikes (Lab)
2019	Paul Andrews (Lab)	Tracey Rawlins (Lab)	Luke Raikes (Lab)
2021	Paul Andrews (Lab)	Tracy Rawlins (Lab)	Luke Raikes (Lab)
2022	Paul Andrews (Lab)	Tracey Rawlins (Lab)	Luke Raikes (Lab)
2023	Paul Andrews (Lab)	Tracey Rawlins (Lab)	Phil Brickell (Lab)
2024	Paul Andrews (Lab)	Tracey Rawlins (Lab)	Phil Brickell (Lab)
September 2024	Paul Andrews (Lab)	Tracey Rawlins (Lab)	Munaver Rasul (Lab)
2026	Sian Astley (Ref UK)	Tracey Rawlins (Lab)	Munaver Rasul (Lab)

== Elections ==
=== Elections in 2020s ===
==== May 2026 ====
2026
Party	Candidate	Votes	%	±%
Reform	Sian Astley	1,329	40.9	New
Labour Co-op	Paul Andrews*	906	27.9	▼37.7
Green	Grace Buczkowska	597	18.4	▲9.7
Conservative	Luke Berry	245	7.5	▼11.7
Liberal Democrats	Bernie Ryan	122	3.8	▼1.9
TUSC	Lynn Worthington	53	1.6	New
Majority		423	13.0	N/A
Turnout		3,252	28.1	▲8.2
Reform gain from Labour Co-op		Swing		

==== September 2024 (by-election) ====
By-election: 5 September 2024
Party	Candidate	Votes	%	±%
Labour Co-op	Munaver Rasul	623	46.9	15.9 ▼
Green	Thirza Asanga-Rae	282	21.2	8.6 ▲
Conservative	Stephen Carlton-Woods	243	18.3	1.6 ▲
Liberal Democrats	Euan Stewart	110	8.3	5.4▲
SDP	Sebastian Moore	71	5.3	New
Majority		341	25.7	
Rejected ballots		14	1.0	
Turnout		1,329		
Labour Co-op hold		Swing	12.3 ▼	

==== May 2024 ====
2024
Party	Candidate	Votes	%	±%
Labour Co-op	Tracey Rawlins*	1,586	62.8	0.4 ▼
Conservative	Luke James Berry	423	16.7	3.7 ▼
Green	Jake Welsh	319	12.6	2.4 ▲
Liberal Democrats	Phil Manktelow	148	5.9	1.8 ▲
Majority		1,163	46.0	
Rejected ballots		50	2.0	
Turnout		2,526	21.6	
Registered electors		11,683		
Labour Co-op hold		Swing	1.6 ▲	

==== May 2023 ====
2023
Party	Candidate	Votes	%	±%
Labour Co-op	Phil Brickell	1,509	67.9	15.2 ▲
Conservative	Luke Berry	377	17.0	1.8 ▲
Green	Jake Welsh	214	9.6	0.2 ▼
Liberal Democrats	Phil Manktelow	106	4.8	0.1 ▲
Majority		1132	50.9	14.3 ▲
Rejected ballots		15	0.7	
Turnout		2,221		
Registered electors		11,428		
Labour Co-op hold		Swing	6.7 ▲	

==== May 2022 ====
2022
Party	Candidate	Votes	%	±%
Labour Co-op	Paul Andrews*	1,489	65.6	2.4 ▼
Conservative	Keith Berry	438	19.2	1.4 ▼
Green	Jake Welsh	198	8.7	1.6 ▼
Liberal Democrats	Seb Bate	130	5.7	0.2 ▼
Majority		1,051	46.4	
Rejected ballots		16		
Turnout		2,255	19.9	0.3 ▲
Registered electors		11,400		
Labour Co-op hold		Swing	0.5 ▼	

==== May 2021 ====
2021
Party	Candidate	Votes	%	±%
Labour Co-op	Tracy Rawlins*	1,622	63.2	7.7 ▼
Conservative	Ezra McGowan	523	20.4	1.3 ▲
Green	Norm Cassidy	262	10.2	6.1 ▲
Liberal Democrats	Seb Bate	104	4.1	1.8 ▼
Monster Raving Loony	Merv the Karaoke Kid	54	2.1	New
Majority		1,099	42.8	
Rejected ballots		22		
Turnout		2,587	22.6	3.0 ▲
Registered electors		11,452		
Labour hold		Swing	4.5 ▼	

=== Elections in 2010s ===
==== May 2019 ====
2019
Party	Candidate	Votes	%	±%
Labour	Luke Raikes*	1,192	52.7	▲2.5
UKIP	Paul O'Donoughue	364	16.1	n/a
Conservative	Peter Harrop	343	15.2	▼0.7
Green	Sarah Mander	222	9.8	▼0.5
Liberal Democrats	Nick Saunders	107	4.7	▼0.2
Communist League	Hugo Wils	12	0.5	n/a
Majority		828	36.6	▲7.0
Rejected ballots		22	0.97	
Turnout		2,264	20.26	
Registered electors		11,176		
Labour hold		Swing	▼6.8	

==== May 2018 ====
2018 (3 vacancies; new boundaries)
Party	Candidate	Votes	%	±%
Labour	Paul Andrews*	1,485	68.0	
Labour	Tracey Rawlins*	1,281	58.7	
Labour	Luke Raikes*	1,095	50.2	
Conservative	Ralph Ellerton	450	20.6	
Conservative	Jagdeep Mehat	314	14.4	
Conservative	Manjit Mehat	275	12.6	
Green	Sarah Mander	224	10.3	
Liberal Democrats	Matt Downey	128	5.9	
Liberal Democrats	Eleanor Nagle	113	5.2	
Liberal Democrats	Theo Penn	82	3.8	
Majority				
Turnout		2,183	19.6	
Labour win (new boundaries)				
Labour win (new boundaries)				
Labour win (new boundaries)				

==== May 2016 ====
2016
Party	Candidate	Votes	%	±%
Labour	Luke John Raikes*	1,579	64.8	+1.4
Conservative	Ralph John Ellerton	400	16.4	+5.3
Green	Bonnie Mercer	154	6.3	+2.0
TUSC	Lynn Worthington	127	5.2	+0.3
Monster Raving Loony	Lord Cameron of Roundwood	91	3.7	n/a
Liberal Democrats	Phil Stubbs	86	3.5	−0.9
Majority		858	35.2	
Turnout		2,437	22.60	
Labour hold		Swing		

==== May 2015 ====
2015
Party	Candidate	Votes	%	±%
Labour Co-op	Paul Gerrard Andrews*	3,099	57.8	−6.8
UKIP	Paul O'Donoughue	1,120	20.9	+12.2
Conservative	Bev Nickson	667	12.4	−1.0
Green	Frank John Clements	232	4.4	+0.3
Liberal Democrats	Christopher Kane	159	3.0	−1.4
TUSC	Lynn Worthington	81	1.5	−1.3
Majority		1,979	36.9	
Turnout		5,358	48.6	+24.4
Labour Co-op hold		Swing		

==== May 2014 ====
2014
Party	Candidate	Votes	%	±%
Labour Co-op	Tracy Rawlins*	1,544	58.60	+11.50
UKIP	Ian George Fleming	602	22.85	+16.05
Conservative	Stephen Paul Woods	247	9.37	−6.83
Green	Frank Clements	116	4.40	+1.60
TUSC	Lynn Worthington	64	2.43	N/A
Liberal Democrats	Rhona Eva Elizabeth Brown	62	2.35	−22.15
Majority		942	35.7	
Turnout		2,635	23.47	
Labour hold		Swing		

==== May 2012 ====
2012
Party	Candidate	Votes	%	±%
Labour	Luke Raikes	1,485	63.4	+16.7
UKIP	Christopher Cassidy	281	12.0	N/A
Conservative	Ralph Ellerton	259	11.1	−12.4
TUSC	Lynn Worthington	115	4.9	N/A
Liberal Democrats	Yvonne Donaghey	102	4.4	−5.7
Green	Jostine Loubster	101	4.3	−3.1
Majority		1,204	51.4	
Turnout		2,343	21.64	
Labour hold		Swing		

==== May 2011 ====
2011
Party	Candidate	Votes	%	±%
Labour Co-op	Paul Andrews*	1,702	64.6	+12.0
Conservative	Ralph Ellerton	353	13.4	−6.6
UKIP	Christopher Cassidy	229	8.7	N/A
Liberal Democrats	Yvonne Donaghey	115	4.4	−5.3
Green	Mike Dagley	109	4.1	−3.2
TUSC	Lynn Worthington	74	2.8	N/A
Independent	Michael Thompson	50	1.9	N/A
Majority		1,349	51.2	
Turnout		2,633	24.2	
Labour hold		Swing		

==== January 2011 (by-election) ====
By-election: 20 January 2011
Party	Candidate	Votes	%	±%
Labour	Tracey Rawlins	996	70.8	+23.7
Conservative	Ralph Ellerton	160	11.4	−4.8
UKIP	Christopher Cassidy	76	5.4	−1.4
Liberal Democrats	Yvonne Donaghey	52	3.7	−20.8
BNP	Bernard Todd	52	3.7	+3.7
Green	Mike Dagley	51	3.6	−0.8
Independent	Honor Donnelly	19	1.4	+1.4
Majority		836	59.5	+36.9
Turnout		1,406	12.9	−32.0
Labour hold		Swing	+14.2	

==== May 2010 ====
2010
Party	Candidate	Votes	%	±%
Labour Co-op	Eddie McCulley*	2,263	47.1	+0.4
Liberal Democrats	Diane Patricia Bennett	1,178	24.5	+14.4
Conservative	Ralph Ellerton	777	16.2	−7.3
UKIP	Eugene Cassidy	329	6.8	+6.8
Green	Ethne Quinn	134	2.8	−4.6
Socialist	Lynn Worthington	128	2.7	−9.6
Majority		1,085	22.6	−0.6
Turnout		4,809	44.9	+22.0
Labour hold		Swing	-7.0	

=== Elections in 2000s ===
==== May 2008 ====
2008
Party	Candidate	Votes	%	±%
Labour Co-op	Tony Burns*	1,123	46.7	−5.9
Conservative	Nathan Cruddas	565	23.5	+3.5
Socialist	Lynn Worthington	295	12.3	+1.9
Liberal Democrats	Ann Rodgers	243	10.1	+0.4
Green	Lynne Richmond	179	7.4	+0.1
Majority		558	23.2	−9.5
Turnout		2,405	22.9	−0.1
Labour hold		Swing	-4.7	

==== May 2007 ====
2007
Party	Candidate	Votes	%	±%
Labour Co-op	Paul Andrews*	1,268	52.6	+3.6
Conservative	John Leaning	481	20.0	−0.2
Socialist	Lynn Worthington	251	10.4	+1.7
Liberal Democrats	William Fisher	233	9.7	−3.4
Green	Karen Duffy	176	7.3	−1.6
Majority		787	32.7	+4.0
Turnout		2,409	23.0	−0.9
Labour hold		Swing	+1.9	

==== May 2006 ====
2006
Party	Candidate	Votes	%	±%
Labour Co-op	Eddie McCulley*	1,205	49.0	−4.8
Conservative	Joyce Kaye	498	20.2	−0.7
Liberal Democrats	Leslie James Ardron	323	13.1	−0.7
Green	Lynne Richmond	220	8.9	−2.5
Socialist	Lynn Worthington	214	8.7	+8.7
Majority		707	28.7	−4.1
Turnout		2,460	23.9	−5.5
Labour hold		Swing	-2.0	

==== June 2004 ====
2004 (3 vacancies; new boundaries)
Party	Candidate	Votes	%	±%
Labour Co-op	Tony Burns*	1,622	54.0	
Labour Co-op	Paul Andrews*	1,297	43.2	
Labour Co-op	Edward McCulley*	1,162	38.7	
Conservative	Christopher Barlow	631	21.0	
Conservative	Carol Roberts	549	18.3	
Conservative	Leslie I'Anson	542	18.0	
Liberal Democrats	Estelle-Marie Burney	417	13.9	
Green	Lynne Richmond	344	11.5	
Liberal Democrats	Matthew Armstrong	296	9.9	
Liberal Democrats	Hayley Lewis	293	9.8	
Green	Beth Knowles	220	7.3	
Green	Peter Somerville	188	6.3	
Majority		531	17.7	
Turnout		3,004	29.4	
Labour Co-op win (new seat)				
Labour Co-op win (new seat)				
Labour Co-op win (new seat)				

==== May 2003 ====
2003
Party	Candidate	Votes	%	±%
Labour Co-op	Edward McCulley*	905	60.1	−5.9
Conservative	Christopher Barlow	324	21.5	+4.0
Liberal Democrats	Mary Gallagher	210	13.9	+1.4
Green	Gareth Pittam	67	4.4	+0.4
Majority		581	38.6	−9.9
Turnout		1,506	17.2	−3.8
Labour hold		Swing	-4.9	

==== May 2002 ====
2002
Party	Candidate	Votes	%	±%
Labour Co-op	Paul Andrews	1,219	66.0	+0.6
Conservative	Ralph Ellerton	323	17.5	−2.5
Liberal Democrats	William Fisher	231	12.5	+0.2
Green	Gareth Pittam	73	4.0	+1.8
Majority		896	48.5	+3.1
Turnout		1,846	21.0	+2.7
Labour hold		Swing	+1.5	

==== January 2001 (by-election) ====
By-election: 25 January 2001
Party	Candidate	Votes	%	±%
Labour	Edward McCulley	685	60.0	−5.4
Liberal Democrats	William Fisher	241	21.1	+8.8
Conservative	David Timson	216	18.9	−1.1
Majority		444	38.9	−6.5
Turnout		1,142	13.0	−5.3
Labour hold		Swing	-7.1	

==== May 2000 ====
2000
Party	Candidate	Votes	%	±%
Labour	Anthony Burns*	971	65.4	−7.3
Conservative	Ralph Ellerton	297	20.0	+2.6
Liberal Democrats	William Fisher	183	12.3	+2.4
Green	Gareth Pittam	33	2.2	+2.2
Majority		674	45.4	−9.9
Turnout		1,484	18.3	−0.9
Labour hold		Swing	-4.9	

=== Elections in 1990s ===
==== May 1999 ====
1999
Party	Candidate	Votes	%	±%
Labour	Gerald Jones*	1,151	72.7	+2.9
Conservative	Ruby Byrom	276	17.4	−2.1
Liberal Democrats	William Fisher	156	9.9	−0.9
Majority		875	55.3	+5.0
Turnout		1,583	19.2	
Labour hold		Swing	+2.5	

==== May 1998 ====
1998
Party	Candidate	Votes	%	±%
Labour	Thomas Farrell*	1,044	69.8	−4.3
Conservative	Robert Caddick	291	19.5	+4.0
Liberal Democrats	Anthony McGarr	161	10.8	+3.1
Majority		753	50.3	−8.3
Turnout		1,496		
Labour hold		Swing	-4.1	

==== May 1996 ====
1996
Party	Candidate	Votes	%	±%
Labour	Anthony Burns*	1,468	74.1	−3.8
Conservative	Trevor Roberts	307	15.5	+3.4
Liberal Democrats	Cath Hall	152	7.7	−0.3
Residents	Hannah Berry	53	2.7	+2.7
Majority		1,161	58.6	−7.5
Turnout		1,980		
Labour hold		Swing	-3.6	

==== May 1995 ====
1995
Party	Candidate	Votes	%	±%
Labour	Gerald Jones	1,836	77.9	+6.1
Conservative	Trevor Roberts	286	12.1	−3.0
Liberal Democrats	V. Purcell	188	8.0	−5.0
Independent	Emma Hamilton	46	2.0	+2.0
Majority		1,550	65.8	+9.1
Turnout		2,356		
Labour hold		Swing	+4.5	

==== May 1994 ====
1994
Party	Candidate	Votes	%	±%
Labour	T. Farrell	1,949	71.8	+18.5
Conservative	P. Fitzsimons	411	15.1	−22.7
Liberal Democrats	G. Hall	353	13.0	+6.0
Majority		1,538	56.7	+41.2
Turnout		2,713		
Labour hold		Swing	+20.6	

==== May 1992 ====
1992
Party	Candidate	Votes	%	±%
Labour	A. Burns*	1,285	53.3	−11.9
Conservative	V. Kirby	912	37.8	+3.0
Liberal Democrats	A. Leech	170	7.0	+7.0
Green	J. Booty	45	1.9	+1.9
Majority		373	15.5	−15.0
Turnout		2,412		
Labour hold		Swing	-7.4	

==== May 1991 ====
1991
Party	Candidate	Votes	%	±%
Labour	W. Smith*	2,065	65.2	+2.0
Conservative	V. C. Kirby	1,100	34.8	+12.3
Majority		965	30.5	−10.2
Turnout		3,165	34.3	
Labour hold		Swing	-5.1	

==== May 1990 ====
1990
Party	Candidate	Votes	%	±%
Labour	J. McNicholls*	2,494	63.2	+5.6
Conservative	V. C. Kirby	889	22.5	−12.6
Liberal Democrats	G. Hall	297	7.5	+0.2
Independent	C. Buller	154	3.9	+3.9
Green	M. G. Abdullah	111	2.8	+2.8
Majority		1,605	40.7	+18.2
Turnout		3,945		
Labour hold		Swing	+9.1	

=== Elections in 1980s ===
==== May 1988 ====
1988 (2 vacancies)
Party	Candidate	Votes	%	±%
Labour	A. Burns*	2,372	57.6	+15.5
Labour	J. McNicholls	2,207		
Conservative	V. C. Kirby	1,443	35.1	+0.5
Conservative	S. W. Lawley	1,414		
SLD	G. Hall	300	7.3	−16.0
SLD	L. H. McLoughlin	246		
Majority		764	22.5	+15.0
Turnout		4,115		
Labour hold		Swing		
Labour hold		Swing	+7.5	

==== May 1987 ====
1987
Party	Candidate	Votes	%	±%
Labour	Winifred Smith*	1,923	42.1	−31.2
Conservative	Simon Lawley	1,582	34.6	+7.9
SDP	Desmond Cooke	1,065	23.3	+23.3
Majority		341	7.5	−39.2
Turnout		4,570		
Labour hold		Swing	-19.5	

==== May 1986 ====
1986
Party	Candidate	Votes	%	±%
Labour	F. Done*	2,666	73.3	+6.7
Conservative	S. Lawley	969	26.7	+1.6
Majority		1,697	46.7	+5.3
Turnout		3,635		
Labour hold		Swing	+2.5	

==== May 1984 ====
1984
Party	Candidate	Votes	%	±%
Labour	Anthony Burns*	2,631	66.6	+4.3
Conservative	Christopher Ennis	993	25.1	−3.3
Liberal	Georgina Hall	328	8.3	−0.9
Majority		1,638	41.4	+7.5
Turnout		3,952		
Labour hold		Swing	+3.8	

==== May 1983 ====
1983
Party	Candidate	Votes	%	±%
Labour	Winifred Smith*	2,826	62.3	+7.3
Conservative	Christopher Ennis	1,290	28.4	+3.9
Liberal	Georgina Hall	419	9.2	−11.3
Majority		1,536	33.9	+3.4
Turnout		4,535		
Labour hold		Swing	+1.7	

==== May 1982 ====
1982 (3 vacancies; new boundaries)
Party	Candidate	Votes	%	±%
Labour	Frances Done*	2,261	51.9	
Labour	Anthony Burns*	2,160	49.6	
Labour	Winifred Smith	2,080	47.7	
Conservative	Christopher Ennis	1,009	23.2	
Conservative	Patricia Fitzsimons	936	21.5	
Conservative	Dorothy Hurst	867	19.9	
Liberal	Leeming Griffiths	844	19.4	
Liberal	Georgina Hall	814	18.7	
Liberal	Muriel James	695	16.0	
Majority		1,071	24.6	
Turnout		4,357	41.0	
Labour win (new seat)				
Labour win (new seat)				
Labour win (new seat)				

==== May 1980 ====
1980
Party	Candidate	Votes	%	±%
Labour	A. Burns*	3,754	65.8	+11.3
Conservative	M. Malbon	1,698	29.8	−7.4
Liberal	P. G. Willams	251	4.4	−3.9
Majority		2,056	36.1	+18.8
Turnout		5,703	41.4	−31.4
Labour hold		Swing	+9.3	

=== Elections in 1970s ===
==== May 1979 ====
1979
Party	Candidate	Votes	%	±%
Labour	K. Robinson	5,412	54.5	−1.9
Conservative	M. Malbon*	3,693	37.2	−6.4
Liberal	P. G. Willams	821	8.3	+8.3
Majority		1,719	17.3	+4.6
Turnout		9,926	72.8	+26.7
Labour gain from Conservative		Swing	+2.2	

==== May 1978 ====
1978
Party	Candidate	Votes	%	±%
Labour	F. Done	3,536	56.4	+3.6
Conservative	P. Fitzsimons	2,737	43.6	+0.5
Majority		799	12.8	+3.1
Turnout		6,273	46.1	
Labour hold		Swing	+1.5	

==== May 1976 ====
1976
Party	Candidate	Votes	%	±%
Labour	A. Burns	3,296	52.8	+6.7
Conservative	J. V. Oatway*	2,693	43.1	−10.8
Liberal	M. Quinn	257	4.1	+4.1
Majority		603	9.7	+6.3
Turnout		6,246		
Labour gain from Conservative		Swing	+8.7	

==== May 1975 ====
1975 (2 vacancies)
Party	Candidate	Votes	%	±%
Conservative	M. Malbon	2,572	53.8	+9.4
Conservative	J. V. Oatway	2,526	52.8	+8.4
Labour	H. Brown	2,202	46.1	−7.8
Labour	C. B. Muir*	2,143	44.8	−9.1
Majority		324	6.8	
Turnout		4,780		
Conservative gain from Labour		Swing		
Conservative gain from Labour		Swing	+8.7	

==== May 1973 ====
1973 (3 vacancies; reorganisation)
Party	Candidate	Votes	%	±%
Labour	F. H. Price*	2,458	53.9	−0.9
Labour	A. P. Marino*	2,349	51.5	−4.9
Labour	C. R. Muir*	2,331	51.1	−5.3
Conservative	M. Malbon	2,025	44.4	+0.8
Conservative	E. J. Whelan	1,983	43.5	−0.1
Conservative	B. H. Farrow	1,853	40.6	−3.0
Majority		306	6.7	−6.1
Turnout		4,561		
Labour hold		Swing		
Labour hold		Swing		
Labour hold		Swing		

==== May 1972 ====
1972
Party	Candidate	Votes	%	±%
Labour	H. Brown*	2,814	56.4	−11.5
Conservative	M. Malbon	2,171	43.6	+7.4
Majority		643	12.8	−11.7
Turnout		4,985		
Labour hold		Swing		

==== May 1971 ====
1971 (3 vacancies; new boundaries)
Party	Candidate	Votes	%	±%
Labour	F. H. Price*	4,432	67.9	
Labour	C. B. Muir	4,249	65.0	
Labour	H. Brown	3,964	60.7	
Conservative	G. I. Woolard*	2,364	36.2	
Conservative	M. Malbon*	2,175	33.3	
Conservative	A. Farmer	2,134	32.7	
Communist	R. Burns	279	4.3	
Majority		1,600	24.5	
Turnout		6,532		
Labour win (new seat)				
Labour win (new seat)				
Labour win (new seat)				

==== May 1970 ====
1970
Party	Candidate	Votes	%	±%
Labour	F. H. Price	3,494	54.0	+9.5
Conservative	T. E. Murphy*	2,981	46.0	−9.5
Majority		513	8.0	
Turnout		6,475		
Labour gain from Conservative		Swing		

=== Elections in 1960s ===
==== May 1969 ====
1969
Party	Candidate	Votes	%	±%
Conservative	G. I. Woolard	3,013	55.5	−3.0
Labour	R. A. Reddington*	2,413	44.5	+9.5
Majority		600	11.0	−12.5
Turnout		5,426		
Conservative gain from Labour		Swing		

==== March 1969 (by-election) ====
By-election: 13 March 1969
Party	Candidate	Votes	%	±%
Conservative	M. Malbon	1,912	51.7	−6.8
Labour	F. H. Price	1,788	48.3	+13.3
Majority		124	3.4	−20.1
Turnout		3,700		
Conservative hold		Swing		

==== May 1968 ====
1968
Party	Candidate	Votes	%	±%
Conservative	I. K. Paley*	3,438	58.5	−1.2
Labour	F. H. Price	2,055	35.0	−5.3
Liberal	K. N. Medhurst	379	6.5	N/A
Majority		1,383	23.5	+4.1
Turnout		5,872		
Conservative hold		Swing		

==== May 1967 ====
1967
Party	Candidate	Votes	%	±%
Conservative	T. E. Murphy	3,456	59.7	+12.1
Labour	H. Lloyd*	2,334	40.3	−12.1
Majority		1,122	19.4	
Turnout		5,790		
Conservative gain from Labour		Swing		

==== May 1966 ====
1966
Party	Candidate	Votes	%	±%
Labour	R. A. Reddington*	2,690	52.4	+9.4
Conservative	R. A. McIlroy	2,448	47.6	+1.4
Majority		242	4.8	
Turnout		5,138		
Labour hold		Swing		

==== May 1965 ====
1965
Party	Candidate	Votes	%	±%
Conservative	I. K. Paley	2,858	46.2	+9.9
Labour	F. H. Price*	2,655	43.0	−7.0
Liberal	E. Page	667	10.8	−2.9
Majority		203	3.2	
Turnout		6,180		
Conservative gain from Labour		Swing		

==== May 1964 ====
1964
Party	Candidate	Votes	%	±%
Labour	H. Lloyd*	2,984	50.0	−2.4
Conservative	I. K. Paley	2,168	36.3	+4.9
Liberal	E. Page	818	13.7	−2.5
Majority		816	13.7	−7.4
Turnout		5,970		
Labour hold		Swing		

==== May 1963 ====
1963
Party	Candidate	Votes	%	±%
Labour	R. A. Reddington	3,559	52.4	+4.2
Conservative	C. Sanders*	2,128	31.4	−0.2
Liberal	G. A. Ruscoe	1,096	16.2	−4.0
Majority		1,431	21.1	+4.5
Turnout		6,783		
Labour gain from Conservative		Swing		

==== May 1962 ====
1962
Party	Candidate	Votes	%	±%
Labour	F. Price*	3,349	48.2	−5.0
Conservative	A. G. Oatway	2,195	31.6	−15.2
Liberal	G. A. Ruscoe	1,400	20.2	N/A
Majority		1,154	16.6	+10.2
Turnout		6,944		
Labour hold		Swing		

==== May 1961 ====
1961
Party	Candidate	Votes	%	±%
Labour	H. Jenkins*	3,452	53.2	+4.5
Conservative	J. Crowe	3,036	46.8	−4.5
Majority		416	6.4	
Turnout		6,488		
Labour hold		Swing		

==== May 1960 ====
1960
Party	Candidate	Votes	%	±%
Conservative	C. O. Sanders	3,042	51.3	+3.2
Labour	W. Frost	2,888	48.7	−3.2
Majority		154	2.6	
Turnout		5,930		
Conservative gain from Labour		Swing		

=== Elections in 1950s ===
==== May 1959 ====
1959
Party	Candidate	Votes	%	±%
Labour	F. H. Price*	3,066	51.9	−8.1
Conservative	W. Fuller	2,836	48.1	+8.1
Majority		230	3.8	−16.2
Turnout		5,902		
Labour hold		Swing		

==== May 1958 ====
1958
Party	Candidate	Votes	%	±%
Labour	T. H. Jenkins*	3,227	60.0	0
Conservative	W. Fuller	2,152	40.0	0
Majority		1,075	20.0	0
Turnout		5,379		
Labour hold		Swing		

==== May 1957 ====
1957
Party	Candidate	Votes	%	±%
Labour	J. Stuart-Cole*	3,485	60.0	+0.8
Conservative	R. J. Payne	2,325	40.0	−0.8
Majority		1,160	20.0	+1.6
Turnout		5,810		
Labour hold		Swing		

==== May 1956 ====
1956
Party	Candidate	Votes	%	±%
Labour	W. Gallacher*	3,000	59.2	+5.3
Conservative	H. T. Fairclough	2,068	40.8	−5.3
Majority		932	18.4	+10.6
Turnout		5,068		
Labour hold		Swing		

==== May 1955 ====
1955
Party	Candidate	Votes	%	±%
Labour	H. Jenkins*	3,193	53.9	−2.7
Conservative	H. T. Fairclough	2,729	46.1	+1.7
Majority		464	7.8	−2.8
Turnout		5,922		
Labour hold		Swing		

==== May 1954 ====
1954 (3 vacancies)
Party	Candidate	Votes	%	±%
Labour	J. Stuart-Cole	3,267	56.6	
Labour	W. Gallacher	3,242	56.2	
Labour	H. Jenkins	3,172	55.0	
Conservative	H. T. Fairclough	2,559	44.4	
Conservative	N. P. Robinson	2,548	44.2	
Conservative	A. Charlton	2,518	43.6	
Majority		613	10.6	
Turnout		5,769		
Labour win (new seat)				
Labour win (new seat)				
Labour win (new seat)				

== See also ==
- Manchester City Council
- Manchester City Council elections
