= Ken Eastham =

British Labour politician (1927–2024)

Member of Parliament for Manchester Blackley
- In office 3 May 1979 – 8 April 1997
- Preceded by: Paul Rose
- Succeeded by: Graham Stringer

Personal details
- Born: 11 August 1927 Manchester, England
- Died: 21 July 2024 (aged 96)
- Party: Labour

Kenneth Eastham (11 August 1927 – 21 July 2024) was a British Labour politician.

== Early life ==
Kenneth Eastham was born in Manchester on 11 August 1927, as the son of James Eastham, a barber. He was a planning engineer for GEC at Trafford Park, Manchester.

== Political career ==
Eastham was a councillor in Manchester for eighteen years. He represented the Beswick area in the City of Manchester for the duration of his local government career, and was first elected as a councillor for the Beswick ward on the county borough in 1963. Following the Local Government Act 1972, he continued to represent the Beswick ward on the new Manchester City Council metropolitan borough, being elected at the inaugural Manchester City Council elections in 1973. Eastham was Chairman of the Planning Committee (from 1971 to 1974) and the Education Committee (from 1978 to 1979). He was Deputy Leader of the Council from 1975 to 1979, and in the same period, a member of the North West Economic Planning Council.

Beswick, which had been in the Manchester Exchange parliamentary seat, became part of the newly-created Manchester Central constituency, but already had a sitting MP. Eastham was thus instead selected for the neighbouring Manchester Blackley. At the 1979 general election, on the same day that he was first elected to the House of Commons as a Member of Parliament, Eastham was re-elected in the Manchester City Council election. At the general election, however, Labour lost power to the Conservatives. Eastham stood down as a councillor at the 1982 local elections.

From 1987 to 1992, Eastham was an Opposition Whip. He remained the MP for Manchester Blackley until his retirement at the 1997 general election, which coincided with the same period in which Labour were out of office nationally. Eastham thus spent his entire career in Parliament in opposition.

== Personal life and death ==
In 1951, Eastham married Doris Howarth, with whom he had a daughter. Eastham lived in Wythenshawe, south Manchester, and died on 21 July 2024, at the age of 96.

== Sources ==
- "Times Guide to the House of Commons", Times Newspapers Limited, 1992 and 1997 editions.

Parliament of the United Kingdom
Preceded by Paul Rose	Member of Parliament for Manchester Blackley; 1979–1997	Succeeded by Graham Stringer
