= Joseph Dean, Baron Dean of Beswick =

British Labour Party politician

Joseph Jabez Dean, Baron Dean of Beswick (3 June 1922 – 26 February 1999) was a British Labour Party politician.

Dean was born and grew up in Manchester. He left school aged 14 and became an engineering apprentice, later working at the Gorton Locomotive Works and Metropolitan-Vickers.

He was a councillor for Manchester Corporation from 1959 to 1974, serving as leader from 1969. He narrowly lost out on selection as the Labour candidate in the February 1974 general election to Gerald Kaufman but stood instead for Leeds West, where he was elected as Member of Parliament (MP). In the House of Commons, he was an assistant government whip from 1978 to 1979.

He served until the 1983 general election when he unexpectedly lost his seat to the Liberal candidate Michael Meadowcroft.

On 28 September 1983, he was created a life peer as Baron Dean of Beswick, of West Leeds in the County of West Yorkshire. He became Labour's spokesperson in the Lords for, at various times, the environment, housing, energy and sport, and served as the peers' representative in the Shadow Cabinet.

== Sources ==
- Times Guide to the House of Commons 1983
- Leigh Rayment's Peerage Pages
- Leigh Rayment's Historical List of MPs – Constituencies beginning with "L" (part 1)

Parliament of the United Kingdom
Preceded by Charles Pannell	Member of Parliament for Leeds West; Feb 1974–1983	Succeeded by Michael Meadowcroft
