= 1924 Manchester City Council election =

Local election in Manchester

- 1 November 1924

35 of 140 seats on Manchester City Council 71 seats needed for a majority
	First party	Second party	Third party
Party	Conservative	Labour	Liberal
Last election	17 seats, 45.3%	10 seats, 34.4%	7 seats, 15.6%
Seats before	79	28	28
Seats won	16	9	8
Seats after	72	32	31
Seat change	▼7	▲4	▲3
Popular vote	54,936	43,693	24,785
Percentage	43.5%	34.6%	19.6%
Swing	▼1.8%	▲0.2%	▲4.0%
	Fourth party
Party	Independent
Last election	1 seats, 3.2%
Seats before	5
Seats won	2
Seats after	5
Seat change	Steady
Popular vote	2,511
Percentage	2.0%
Swing	▼1.2%
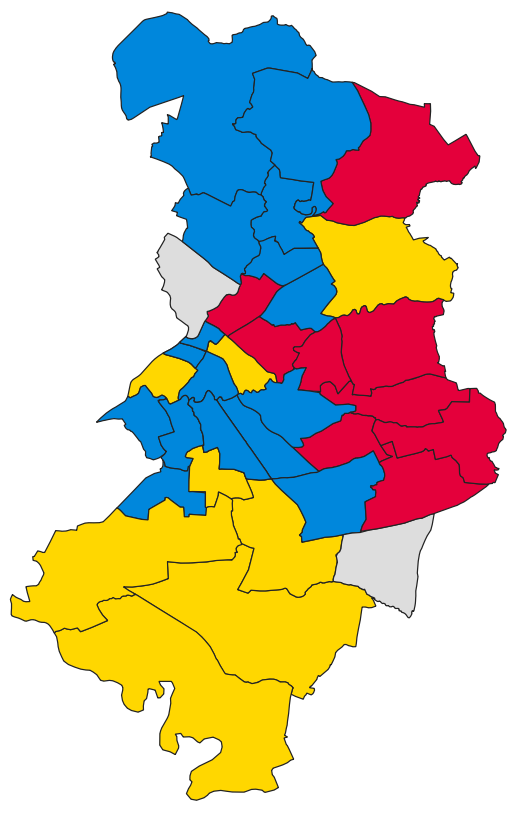
- Map of results of 1924 election
Leader of the Council before election
Conservative
Leader of the Council after election
Conservative

Elections to Manchester City Council were held on Saturday, 1 November 1924. One third of the councillors seats were up for election, with each successful candidate to serve a three-year term of office. The Conservative Party retained overall control of the council.

== Election result ==
Party	Votes		Seats			Full Council	
Conservative Party	54,936 (43.5%)	▼1.8	16 (45.7%)	16 / 35	▼7	72 (51.4%)	72 / 140
Labour Party	43,693 (34.6%)	▲0.2	9 (25.7%)	9 / 35	▲4	32 (22.9%)	32 / 140
Liberal Party	24,785 (19.6%)	▲4.0	8 (22.9%)	8 / 35	▲3	31 (22.1%)	31 / 140
Independent	2,511 (2.0%)	▲1.2	2 (5.7%)	2 / 35	Steady	5 (3.6%)	5 / 140
National Unemployed Workers' Movement	399 (0.3%)	N/A	0 (0.0%)	0 / 35	N/A	0 (0.0%)	0 / 140

=== Full council ===
↓
32	31	5	72

== Ward results ==
=== All Saints' ===
All Saints'
Party	Candidate	Votes	%	±%
Conservative	E. Pierce*	2,147	60.5	+24.0
Labour	A. M. Thompson	1,400	39.5	+14.5
Majority		747	21.0	
Turnout		3,547		
Conservative hold		Swing		

=== Ardwick ===
Ardwick
Party	Candidate	Votes	%	±%
Conservative	M. L. K. Jones*	3,381	55.2	+4.1
Labour	J. M. Wharton	2,748	44.8	−4.1
Majority		633	10.4	
Turnout		6,129		
Conservative hold		Swing		

=== Beswick ===
Beswick
Party	Candidate	Votes	%	±%
Labour	L. B. Cox*	uncontested		
Labour hold		Swing		

=== Blackley ===
Blackley
Party	Candidate	Votes	%	±%
Conservative	J. E. Littler*	2,918	68.2	N/A
Labour	W. R. Watson	1,360	31.8	N/A
Majority		1,558	36.4	N/A
Turnout		4,278		
Conservative hold		Swing		

=== Bradford ===
Bradford
Party	Candidate	Votes	%	±%
Labour	J. Binns*	uncontested		
Labour hold		Swing		

=== Cheetham ===
Cheetham
Party	Candidate	Votes	%	±%
Conservative	A. Whitworth*	uncontested		
Conservative hold		Swing		

=== Chorlton-cum-Hardy ===
Chorlton-cum-Hardy
Party	Candidate	Votes	%	±%
Liberal	S. D. Simon	5,113	53.0	+4.2
Conservative	J. Lees-Jones*	4,534	47.0	−4.2
Majority		579	6.0	
Turnout		9,647		
Liberal gain from Conservative		Swing		

=== Collegiate Church ===
Collegiate Church
Party	Candidate	Votes	%	±%
Independent	D. Gouldman*	1,328	72.8	N/A
Labour	S. Herbert	496	27.2	N/A
Majority		832	45.6	
Turnout		1,824		
Independent hold		Swing		

=== Collyhurst ===
Collyhurst
Party	Candidate	Votes	%	±%
Conservative	W. Chapman	2,901	51.4	−3.3
Labour	I. Floyd	2,746	48.6	+3.3
Majority		155	2.8	−6.6
Turnout		5,547		
Conservative hold		Swing		

=== Crumpsall ===
Crumpsall
Party	Candidate	Votes	%	±%
Conservative	F. J. Robertshaw*	uncontested		
Conservative hold		Swing		

=== Didsbury ===
Didsbury
Party	Candidate	Votes	%	±%
Liberal	J. Swarbrick*	2,333	62.9	+22.7
Conservative	F. Stapleton	1,375	37.1	−22.7
Majority		958	25.8	
Turnout		3,708		
Liberal hold		Swing		

=== Exchange ===
Exchange
Party	Candidate	Votes	%	±%
Conservative	G. Westcott*	uncontested		
Conservative hold		Swing		

=== Gorton North ===
Gorton North
Party	Candidate	Votes	%	±%
Labour	T. Walker	3,842	64.0	N/A
Conservative	E. E. Walsh	2,164	36.0	N/A
Majority		1,678	28.0	N/A
Turnout		6,006		
Labour gain from Conservative		Swing		

=== Gorton South ===
Gorton South
Party	Candidate	Votes	%	±%
Labour	J. Brown	3,354	55.7	−1.5
Conservative	C. J. Willis	2,627	43.6	+0.8
National Unemployed Workers' Movement	W. Stopford	40	0.7	N/A
Majority		727	12.1	−2.3
Turnout		6,021		
Labour hold		Swing		

=== Harpurhey ===
Harpurhey
Party	Candidate	Votes	%	±%
Conservative	W. Gilgryst*	3,189	54.8	−1.8
Labour	A. E. Wolstenholme	2,628	45.2	+1.8
Majority		561	9.6	−3.6
Turnout		5,817		
Conservative hold		Swing		

=== Levenshulme ===
Levenshulme
Party	Candidate	Votes	%	±%
Independent	R. S. Harper*	uncontested		
Independent hold		Swing		

=== Longsight ===
Longsight
Party	Candidate	Votes	%	±%
Conservative	J. H. Meachin	2,469	45.6	−15.1
Independent	M. E. Greenwood	1,089	20.1	N/A
Labour	E. J. Hookway	1,089	20.1	N/A
Liberal	J. Whittle	764	14.1	N/A
Majority		1,380	25.5	+4.1
Turnout		5,411		
Conservative hold		Swing		

=== Medlock Street ===
Medlock Street
Party	Candidate	Votes	%	±%
Conservative	S. Woollam*	4,247	69.5	−16.1
Labour	T. F. Regan	1,844	30.2	N/A
National Unemployed Workers' Movement	P. Keeley	24	0.4	N/A
Majority		2,403	39.3	−31.9
Turnout		6,115		
Conservative hold		Swing		

=== Miles Platting ===
Miles Platting
Party	Candidate	Votes	%	±%
Conservative	S. Bloor*	3,463	50.1	+7.2
Labour	D. Taylor	3,459	49.9	−7.2
Majority		4	0.2	
Turnout		6,922		
Conservative hold		Swing		

=== Moss Side East ===
Moss Side East
Party	Candidate	Votes	%	±%
Liberal	J. B. Zimmern	1,791	50.7	+4.2
Conservative	J. C. Brister	1,647	46.6	+15.5
Independent	A. R. Edwards	94	2.7	N/A
Majority		144	4.1	−11.3
Turnout		3,532		
Liberal gain from Conservative		Swing		

=== Moss Side West ===
Moss Side West
Party	Candidate	Votes	%	±%
Conservative	T. Dunham*	2,484	52.3	N/A
Liberal	W. H. Wood	2,268	47.7	N/A
Majority		216	4.6	N/A
Turnout		4,752		
Conservative hold		Swing		

=== Moston ===
Moston
Party	Candidate	Votes	%	±%
Labour	G. G. Wellings	2,791	46.9	+2.3
Conservative	P. Alberti	2,041	34.3	−4.2
Liberal	G. Ward	1,122	18.8	+1.9
Majority		750	12.6	+6.5
Turnout		5,954		
Labour gain from Conservative		Swing		

=== New Cross ===
New Cross
Party	Candidate	Votes	%	±%
Labour	R. Matthews	2,855	52.4	+10.7
Liberal	J. Milner*	2,593	47.6	N/A
Majority		262	4.8	
Turnout		5,448		
Labour gain from Liberal		Swing		

=== Newton Heath ===
Newton Heath
Party	Candidate	Votes	%	±%
Liberal	C. W. Godbert*	3,358	61.6	N/A
Labour	H. Frankland	2,091	38.4	−18.5
Majority		1,267	23.2	
Turnout		5,449		
Liberal hold		Swing		

=== Openshaw ===
Openshaw
Party	Candidate	Votes	%	±%
Labour	J. W. Aveson	3,005	54.8	−3.0
Conservative	H. D. Judson*	2,474	45.2	+3.0
Majority		531	9.6	−6.0
Turnout		5,005		
Labour gain from Conservative		Swing		

=== Oxford ===
Oxford
Party	Candidate	Votes	%	±%
Conservative	O. P. Lancashire*	uncontested		
Conservative hold		Swing		

=== Rusholme ===
Rusholme
Party	Candidate	Votes	%	±%
Liberal	R. G. Edwards	uncontested		
Liberal hold		Swing		

=== St. Ann's ===
St. Ann's
Party	Candidate	Votes	%	±%
Conservative	C. F. Brierley*	uncontested		
Conservative hold		Swing		

=== St. Clement's ===
St. Clement's
Party	Candidate	Votes	%	±%
Liberal	W. Melland*	uncontested		
Liberal hold		Swing		

=== St. George's ===
St. George's
Party	Candidate	Votes	%	±%
Conservative	R. Taylor	2,309	39.7	−4.8
Labour	C. Beamand	2,294	39.5	+6.8
Liberal	A. Todd	1,211	20.8	−2.0
Majority		15	0.2	−11.6
Turnout		5,814		
Conservative hold		Swing		

=== St. John's ===
St. John's
Party	Candidate	Votes	%	±%
Liberal	W. Barton	867	55.2	N/A
Conservative	A. E. Ingle	705	44.8	N/A
Majority		162	10.4	N/A
Turnout		1,572		
Liberal gain from Conservative		Swing		

=== St. Luke's ===
St. Luke's
Party	Candidate	Votes	%	±%
Conservative	T. H. Hinchcliffe*	2,787	62.2	+9.8
Liberal	F. Tebb	1,692	37.8	−9.8
Majority		1,095	24.4	+19.6
Turnout		4,479		
Conservative hold		Swing		

=== St. Mark's ===
St. Mark's
Party	Candidate	Votes	%	±%
Labour	I. Brassington*	3,142	62.5	+4.5
Conservative	J. T. Jones	1,549	30.8	−11.2
National Unemployed Workers' Movement	E. Jones	335	6.7	N/A
Majority		1,593	31.7	+15.7
Turnout		5,026		
Labour hold		Swing		

=== St. Michael's ===
St. Michael's
Party	Candidate	Votes	%	±%
Labour	T. Cassidy*	2,549	57.9	+0.1
Conservative	J. Holland	1,855	42.1	−0.1
Majority		694	15.8	+0.2
Turnout		4,404		
Labour hold		Swing		

=== Withington ===
Withington
Party	Candidate	Votes	%	±%
Liberal	A. P. Simon	1,673	50.1	−5.2
Conservative	J. Mellor*	1,670	49.9	+5.2
Majority		3	0.2	
Turnout		3,343		
Liberal gain from Conservative		Swing		

== Aldermanic election ==
=== Aldermanic election, 4 February 1925 ===
Caused by the death on 20 January 1925 of Alderman Thomas Watmough (Conservative, elected as an alderman by the council on 10 November 1913).

In his place, Councillor F. J. Robertshaw (Conservative, Crumpsall, elected 14 May 1907) was elected as an alderman by the council on 4 February 1925.

Party	Alderman	Ward	Term expires
Conservative	F. J. Robertshaw	Exchange	1928

=== Aldermanic election, 7 October 1925 ===
Caused by the death on 25 September 1925 of Alderman Sir Charles Behrens (Liberal, elected as an alderman by the council on 31 October 1917).

In his place, Councillor William Chapman (Conservative, Collyhurst, elected 1 November 1924; previously 1921-23 and 1907-20) was elected as an alderman by the council on 7 October 1925.

Party	Alderman	Ward	Term expires
Conservative	William Chapman	Oxford	1928

== By-elections between 1924 and 1925 ==
=== Crumpsall, 10 February 1925 ===
Caused by the election as an alderman of Councillor F. J. Robertshaw (Conservative, Crumpsall, elected 14 May 1907) on 4 February 1925 following the death on 20 January 1925 of Alderman Thomas Watmough (Conservative, elected as an alderman by the council on 10 November 1913).

Crumpsall
Party	Candidate	Votes	%	±%
Conservative	J. Sever	uncontested		
Conservative hold		Swing		

=== Collyhurst, 20 October 1925 ===
Caused by the election as an alderman of Councillor William Chapman (Conservative, Collyhurst, elected 1 November 1924; previously 1921-23 and 1907-20) on 7 October 1925 following the death on 25 September 1925 of Alderman Sir Charles Behrens (Liberal, elected as an alderman by the council on 31 October 1917).

Collyhurst
Party	Candidate	Votes	%	±%
Labour	I. Floyd	2,489	54.5	+5.9
Conservative	C. F. Howarth	2,081	45.5	−5.9
Majority		408	9.0	
Turnout		4,570		
Labour gain from Conservative		Swing		
