= 1905 Manchester City Council election =

Local election in Manchester

- 1 November 1905

31 of 124 seats to Manchester City Council 63 seats needed for a majority
	First party	Second party	Third party
Party	Liberal	Conservative	Labour
Last election	14 seats, 32.1%	18 seats, 33.3%	4 seats, 14.2%
Seats before	52	57	8
Seats won	14	12	5
Seats after	54	52	12
Seat change	▲2	▼5	▲4
Popular vote	12,826	20,221	10,425
Percentage	28.1%	44.2%	22.8%
Swing	▼4.0%	▲10.9%	▲8.6%
	Fourth party
Party	Independent
Last election	6 seats, 17.3%
Seats before	7
Seats won	0
Seats after	6
Seat change	▼1
Popular vote	1,546
Percentage	3.4%
Swing	▼12.9%
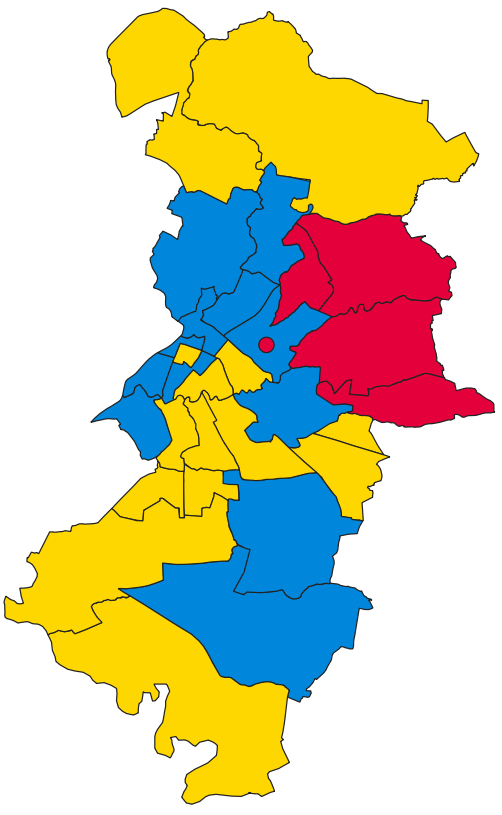
- Map of results of 1905 election
Leader of the Council before election
No overall control
Leader of the Council after election
No overall control

Elections to Manchester City Council were held on Wednesday, 1 November 1905. One third of the councillors seats were up for election, with each successful candidate to serve a three-year term of office. The council remained under no overall control.

== Election result ==
Party	Votes		Seats			Full Council	
Liberal Party	12,826 (28.1%)	▼4.0	14 (45.2%)	14 / 31	▲2	54 (43.5%)	54 / 124
Conservative Party	20,221 (44.2%)	▲10.9	12 (38.7%)	12 / 31	▼5	52 (41.9%)	52 / 124
Labour Party	10,425 (22.8%)	▲8.6	5 (16.2%)	5 / 31	▲4	12 (9.7%)	12 / 124
Independent	1,546 (3.4%)	▼12.9	0 (0.0%)	0 / 31	▼1	6 (4.8%)	6 / 124
Independent Liberal	682 (1.5%)	N/A	0 (0.0%)	0 / 31	N/A	0 (0.0%)	0 / 124

=== Full council ===
↓
12	54	6	52

=== Aldermen ===
↓
20	11

=== Councillors ===
↓
12	34	6	41

== Ward results ==
=== All Saints' ===
All Saints'
Party	Candidate	Votes	%	±%
Liberal	W. B. Pritchard*	uncontested		
Liberal hold		Swing		

=== Ardwick ===
Ardwick
Party	Candidate	Votes	%	±%
Conservative	J. Stewart*	1,950	66.8	+25.5
Labour	R. Robinson	967	33.2	−25.5
Majority		983	33.6	
Turnout		2,917		
Conservative hold		Swing		

=== Blackley and Moston ===
Blackley and Moston
Party	Candidate	Votes	%	±%
Liberal	G. Bennett*	1,873	58.5	N/A
Conservative	J. R. Coutts	1,331	41.5	N/A
Majority		542	17.0	N/A
Turnout		3,204		
Liberal hold		Swing		

=== Bradford ===
Bradford
Party	Candidate	Votes	%	±%
Labour	J. Billam	2,868	57.2	N/A
Conservative	C. Dreyfus*	2,144	42.8	N/A
Majority		724	14.4	N/A
Turnout		5,012		
Labour gain from Conservative		Swing		

=== Cheetham ===
Cheetham
Party	Candidate	Votes	%	±%
Conservative	R. Oliver*	uncontested		
Conservative hold		Swing		

=== Chorlton-cum-Hardy ===
Chorlton-cum-Hardy
Party	Candidate	Votes	%	±%
Liberal	H. Kemp*	878	51.9	+1.4
Conservative	T. Wilson	813	48.1	−13.4
Majority		65	3.8	−0.3
Turnout		1,691		
Liberal hold		Swing		

=== Collegiate Church ===
Collegiate Church
Party	Candidate	Votes	%	±%
Conservative	J. Lowry*	uncontested		
Conservative hold		Swing		

=== Crumpsall ===
Crumpsall
Party	Candidate	Votes	%	±%
Liberal	G. H. Rawsthorn	765	59.2	N/A
Conservative	J. Hislop	527	40.8	N/A
Majority		238	18.4	N/A
Turnout		1,292		
Liberal gain from Conservative		Swing		

=== Didsbury ===
Didsbury
Party	Candidate	Votes	%	±%
Liberal	C. J. H. Gradisky	600	54.3	N/A
Independent	C. S. Edwards*	504	45.7	−2.8
Majority		96	8.6	
Turnout		1,104		
Liberal gain from Independent		Swing		

=== Exchange ===
Exchange
Party	Candidate	Votes	%	±%
Conservative	T. Smethurst*	uncontested		
Conservative hold		Swing		

=== Harpurhey ===
Harpurhey
Party	Candidate	Votes	%	±%
Conservative	W. Holden*	2,384	54.8	N/A
Labour	T. D. Benson	1,967	45.2	N/A
Majority		417	9.6	
Turnout		4,351		
Conservative hold		Swing		

=== Longsight ===
Longsight
Party	Candidate	Votes	%	±%
Liberal	O. Heggs*	1,232	61.9	+12.9
Conservative	W. Cundiff	759	38.1	−12.9
Majority		473	23.8	
Turnout		1,991		
Liberal hold		Swing		

=== Medlock Street ===
Medlock Street
Party	Candidate	Votes	%	±%
Liberal	J. D. Pennington*	1,345	51.1	+4.2
Conservative	J. H. Swales	1,287	48.9	−4.2
Majority		58	2.2	
Turnout		2,632		
Liberal hold		Swing		

=== Miles Platting ===
Miles Platting
Party	Candidate	Votes	%	±%
Labour	J. E. Gilchrist	1,097	56.7	+12.2
Conservative	H. Heenan*	838	43.3	N/A
Majority		259	13.4	
Turnout		1,935		
Labour gain from Conservative		Swing		

=== Moss Side East ===
Moss Side East
Party	Candidate	Votes	%	±%
Liberal	J. Bowie*	uncontested		
Liberal hold		Swing		

=== Moss Side West ===
Moss Side West
Party	Candidate	Votes	%	±%
Liberal	W. Hynes*	755	45.3	−5.5
Conservative	A. Gresty	637	38.2	−4.6
Labour	A. Ogden	275	16.5	−31.3
Majority		118	7.1	+4.6
Turnout		1,667		
Liberal hold		Swing		

=== New Cross ===
New Cross
Party	Candidate	Votes	%	±%
Conservative	N. Meadowcroft*	1,978	53.0	N/A
Labour	T. R. Marr	1,952	52.3	N/A
Liberal	J. Sheldon	1,816	48.7	N/A
Conservative	W. B. Broadhead*	1,711	45.9	N/A
Majority		136	3.6	N/A
Turnout		3,729		
Conservative hold		Swing		
Labour gain from Conservative		Swing		

=== Newton Heath ===
Newton Heath
Party	Candidate	Votes	%	±%
Labour	J. J. Rudge	1,299	51.1	N/A
Conservative	E. J. Churchman	1,244	48.9	N/A
Majority		55	2.2	N/A
Turnout		2,543		
Labour gain from Conservative		Swing		

=== Openshaw ===
Openshaw
Party	Candidate	Votes	%	±%
Labour	E. J. Hart*	uncontested		
Labour hold		Swing		

=== Oxford ===
Oxford
Party	Candidate	Votes	%	±%
Liberal	A. Burgon*	412	66.8	−4.9
Conservative	W. B. Midgley	205	33.2	N/A
Majority		207	33.6	−9.8
Turnout		617		
Liberal hold		Swing		

=== Rusholme ===
Rusholme
Party	Candidate	Votes	%	±%
Conservative	W. F. Lane-Scott*	uncontested		
Conservative hold		Swing		

=== St. Ann's ===
St. Ann's
Party	Candidate	Votes	%	±%
Liberal	G. Heathcote	431	52.0	N/A
Conservative	G. Dodson*	398	48.0	N/A
Majority		33	4.0	N/A
Turnout		829		
Liberal gain from Conservative		Swing		

=== St. Clement's ===
St. Clement's
Party	Candidate	Votes	%	±%
Liberal	G. F. Burditt	638	55.4	N/A
Conservative	J. B. Langley*	513	44.6	N/A
Majority		125	10.8	N/A
Turnout		1,151		
Liberal gain from Conservative		Swing		

=== St. George's ===
St. George's
Party	Candidate	Votes	%	±%
Conservative	A. Craven*	uncontested		
Conservative hold		Swing		

=== St. James' ===
St. James'
Party	Candidate	Votes	%	±%
Conservative	H. Samson*	uncontested		
Conservative hold		Swing		

=== St. John's ===
St. John's
Party	Candidate	Votes	%	±%
Conservative	T. Watmough*	uncontested		
Conservative hold		Swing		

=== St. Luke's ===
St. Luke's
Party	Candidate	Votes	%	±%
Liberal	H. Marsden*	uncontested		
Liberal hold		Swing		

=== St. Mark's ===
St. Mark's
Party	Candidate	Votes	%	±%
Liberal	J. Allison*	985	59.1	N/A
Independent Liberal	H. J. Whitehouse	682	40.9	N/A
Majority		303	18.2	N/A
Turnout		1,667		
Liberal hold		Swing		

=== St. Michael's ===
St. Michael's
Party	Candidate	Votes	%	±%
Conservative	R. Leah	1,073	43.1	−9.5
Independent	M. Kinahan	739	29.7	N/A
Liberal	W. May*	677	27.2	N/A
Majority		334	13.4	+8.2
Turnout		2,489		
Conservative gain from Liberal		Swing		

=== Withington ===
Withington
Party	Candidate	Votes	%	±%
Conservative	H. King	429	37.3	−30.2
Liberal	R. Fleeson*	419	36.4	−17.0
Independent	R. R. Shaw	303	26.3	−10.4
Majority		10	0.9	
Turnout		1,151		
Conservative gain from Liberal		Swing		

== Aldermanic elections ==
=== Aldermanic election, 13 June 1906 ===
Caused by the death on 24 May 1906 of Alderman James Tunstall (Conservative, elected as an alderman by the council on 20 January 1897).

In his place, Councillor Hermann Goldschmidt (Liberal, St. James', elected 13 April 1892) was elected as an alderman by the council on 13 June 1906.

Party	Alderman	Ward	Term expires
Liberal	Hermann Goldschmidt		1910

== By-elections between 1905 and 1906 ==
=== Longsight, 15 November 1905 ===
Caused by the election as an alderman of Councillor John Robert Wilson (Conservative, Longsight, elected 30 November 1890) on 25 October 1905 following the resignation on 2 October 1905 of Alderman Sir John Harwood (Liberal, elected as an alderman by the council on 21 February 1881).

Longsight
Party	Candidate	Votes	%	±%
Liberal	H. Hodkin	uncontested		
Liberal gain from Conservative		Swing		

=== Crumpsall, 7 May 1906 ===
Caused by the resignation of Councillor Dr. William Francis Dearden (Conservative, Crumpsall, elected 1 November 1895) on 2 May 1906.

Crumpsall
Party	Candidate	Votes	%	±%
Conservative	G. F. H. Gibson	uncontested		
Conservative hold		Swing		

=== St. James', 18 June 1906 ===
Caused by the election as an alderman of Councillor Hermann Goldschmidt (Liberal, St. James', elected 13 April 1892) on 13 June 1906 following the death on 24 May 1906 of Alderman James Tunstall (Conservative, elected as an alderman by the council on 20 January 1897).

St. James'
Party	Candidate	Votes	%	±%
Liberal	E. Holt	uncontested		
Liberal hold		Swing		
