= Withington (ward) =

- Ward
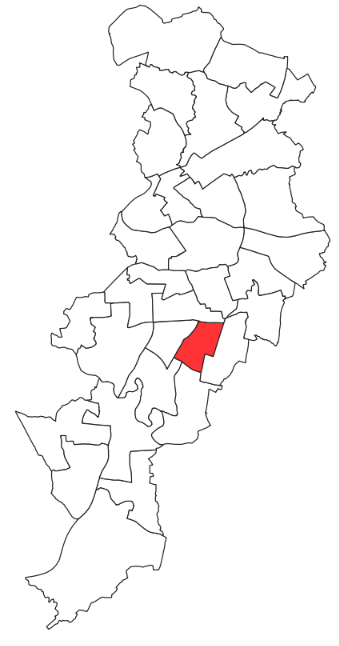
- Withington ward (2018) within Manchester

- Coat of arms
- Interactive map of Withington
- Country: United Kingdom
- Constituent country: England
- Region: North West England
- County: Greater Manchester
- Metropolitan borough: Manchester
- Created: November 1904
- Named for: Withington

Government
  - Type: Unicameral
  - Body: Manchester City Council
- UK Parliamentary Constituency: Manchester Rusholme, Manchester Withington

Withington, is an electoral division of Manchester City Council which has been represented since 1904. It covers the South Manchester suburb of Withington.

== Overview ==
Withington ward was created in 1904, as a result of the Manchester Extension Scheme 1904, which transferred the urban districts of Moss Side and Withington to the Manchester corporation. Initially, the ward's boundaries corresponded with those of the Fallowfield and Withington wards of the former Withington Urban District, these boundaries were not affected by a city-wide boundary revision in 1919. In 1950, that part of the ward to the east of Parrs Wood Road was transferred to the new Burnage ward, while that part of the ward to the west of Burton Road and Wilmslow Road was transferred to the new Old Moat ward. After a further boundary revision in 1971, the ward's western boundary became the Styal Line, these boundaries were left unchanged by another city-wide boundary revision in 1982. In 2004, the southern portion of the ward was transferred to the new Didsbury East ward. Following the latest revision in 2018, the ward's southern boundary became Parkville Road.

From its creation until 1918, the ward formed part of the Stretford Parliamentary constituency. Since 1918, it has been part of the Manchester Withington Parliamentary constituency.

== Councillors ==
Election	Councillor	Councillor	Councillor
1904	S. Edwards (Con)	H. Derwent Simpson (Con)	R. Fleeson (Lib)
1905	S. Edwards (Con)	H. Derwent Simpson (Con)	H. King (Con)
1906	S. Edwards (Con)	H. Derwent Simpson (Con)	H. King (Con)
1907	S. Edwards (Con)	H. Derwent Simpson (Con)	H. King (Con)
1908	S. Edwards (Con)	H. Derwent Simpson (Con)	M. Ashton (Ind)
1909	S. Edwards (Con)	H. Derwent Simpson (Con)	M. Ashton (Ind)
1910	S. Edwards (Con)	H. Derwent Simpson (Con)	M. Ashton (Ind)
1911	S. Edwards (Con)	H. Derwent Simpson (Con)	M. Ashton (Ind)
1912	S. Edwards (Con)	H. Derwent Simpson (Con)	M. Ashton (Ind)
1913	J. C. Jones (Ind)	H. Derwent Simpson (Con)	M. Ashton (Ind)
1914	J. C. Jones (Ind)	H. Derwent Simpson (Con)	M. Ashton (Ind)
May 1919	J. C. Jones (Lib)	L. F. Massey (Ind)	M. Ashton (Lib)
1919	J. C. Jones (Lib)	L. F. Massey (Ind)	M. Ashton (Lib)
1920	J. C. Jones (Lib)	L. F. Massey (Ind)	M. Ashton (Lib)
1921	J. C. Jones (Lib)	L. F. Massey (Ind)	J. Mellor (Con)
1922	J. C. Jones (Lib)	L. F. Massey (Ind)	J. Mellor (Con)
August 1923	W. A. Lewins (Lib)	L. F. Massey (Ind)	J. Mellor (Con)
1923	W. A. Lewins (Lib)	L. F. Massey (Ind)	J. Mellor (Con)
1924	W. A. Lewins (Lib)	L. F. Massey (Ind)	A. P. Simon (Lib)
1925	W. A. Lewins (Lib)	W. Challoner (Con)	A. P. Simon (Lib)
1926	J. S. Hill (Con)	W. Challoner (Con)	A. P. Simon (Lib)
1927	J. S. Hill (Con)	W. Challoner (Con)	A. P. Simon (Lib)
1928	J. S. Hill (Con)	T. H. Davis (Lib)	A. P. Simon (Lib)
1929	J. S. Hill (Con)	T. H. Davis (Lib)	A. P. Simon (Lib)
1930	J. S. Hill (Con)	T. H. Davis (Lib)	A. P. Simon (Lib)
1931	J. S. Hill (Con)	T. H. Davis (Lib)	A. P. Simon (Lib)
1932	J. S. Hill (Con)	T. H. Davis (Lib)	A. P. Simon (Lib)
1933	J. S. Hill (Con)	T. H. Davis (Lib)	A. P. Simon (Lib)
1934	J. S. Hill (Con)	T. H. Davis (Lib)	A. P. Simon (Lib)
1935	J. S. Hill (Con)	T. H. Davis (Lib)	A. P. Simon (Lib)
1936	J. S. Hill (Con)	T. H. Davis (Lib)	R. S. Woffenden (Con)
1937	J. S. Hill (Con)	W. H. Scholfield (Con)	R. S. Woffenden (Con)
1938	J. S. Hill (Con)	W. H. Scholfield (Con)	R. S. Woffenden (Con)
1945	H. Bentley (Con)	W. H. Scholfield (Con)	G. Lord (Con)
1946	H. Bentley (Con)	W. H. Scholfield (Con)	G. Lord (Con)
1947	H. Bentley (Con)	W. H. Scholfield (Con)	G. Lord (Con)
1949	H. Bentley (Con)	W. H. Scholfield (Con)	G. Lord (Con)
1950	H. Bentley (Con)	W. H. Scholfield (Con)	J. McGrath (Con)
1951	W. A. Stovell (Con)	W. H. Scholfield (Con)	J. McGrath (Con)
1952	W. A. Stovell (Con)	W. H. Scholfield (Con)	J. McGrath (Con)
1953	W. A. Stovell (Con)	W. H. Scholfield (Con)	J. McGrath (Con)
1954	W. A. Stovell (Con)	W. H. Scholfield (Con)	J. McGrath (Con)
1955	W. A. Stovell (Con)	W. H. Scholfield (Con)	J. McGrath (Con)
1956	W. A. Stovell (Con)	W. H. Scholfield (Con)	J. McGrath (Con)
1957	W. A. Stovell (Con)	W. H. Scholfield (Con)	J. McGrath (Con)
1958	W. A. Stovell (Con)	W. H. Scholfield (Con)	J. McGrath (Con)
1959	W. A. Stovell (Con)	W. H. Scholfield (Con)	J. McGrath (Con)
1960	E. R. Coker (Con)	W. H. Scholfield (Con)	J. McGrath (Con)
1961	E. R. Coker (Con)	W. H. Scholfield (Con)	J. McGrath (Con)
1962	E. R. Coker (Con)	J. S. Alldridge (Lib)	J. McGrath (Con)
1963	E. R. Coker (Con)	J. S. Alldridge (Lib)	J. McGrath (Con)
1964	E. R. Coker (Con)	J. S. Alldridge (Lib)	W. Crabtree (Con)
1965	E. R. Coker (Con)	G. W. Young (Con)	W. Crabtree (Con)
1966	E. R. Coker (Con)	G. W. Young (Con)	W. Crabtree (Con)
1967	E. R. Coker (Con)	G. W. Young (Con)	W. Crabtree (Con)
1968	E. R. Coker (Con)	G. W. Young (Con)	W. Crabtree (Con)
1969	E. R. Coker (Con)	G. W. Young (Con)	W. Crabtree (Con)
1970	E. R. Coker (Con)	G. W. Young (Con)	W. Crabtree (Con)
1971	E. R. Coker (Con)	W. Crabtree (Con)	G. W. Young (Con)
1972	E. R. Coker (Con)	W. Crabtree (Con)	G. W. Young (Con)
1973	E. R. Coker (Con)	G. W. Young (Con)	W. Crabtree (Con)
1975	E. R. Coker (Con)	G. W. Young (Con)	W. Crabtree (Con)
1976	E. R. Coker (Con)	G. W. Young (Con)	W. Crabtree (Con)
1978	E. R. Coker (Con)	G. W. Young (Con)	W. Crabtree (Con)
November 1978	A. Jones (Lib)	G. W. Young (Con)	W. Crabtree (Con)
1979	A. Jones (Lib)	G. W. Young (Con)	D. J. Sandiford (Lib)
1980	A. Jones (Lib)	J. M. Jacobs (Con)	D. J. Sandiford (Lib)
1982	A. Jones (Lib)	J. M. Jacobs (Con)	M. Davies (Con)
1983	A. Jones (Lib)	J. M. Jacobs (Con)	D. J. Sandiford (Lib)
1984	A. Jones (Lib)	A. Firth (Lib)	D. J. Sandiford (Lib)
1986	A. Jones (Lib)	A. Firth (Lib)	D. J. Sandiford (Lib)
1987	A. Jones (Lib)	A. Firth (Lib)	D. J. Sandiford (Lib)
1988	A. Jones (SLD)	A. Firth (SLD)	D. J. Sandiford (SLD)
1990	A. Jones (Lib Dem)	A. Firth (Lib Dem)	D. J. Sandiford (Lib Dem)
1991	A. Jones (Lib Dem)	A. Firth (Lib Dem)	D. J. Sandiford (Lib Dem)
1992	A. Jones (Lib Dem)	A. Firth (Lib Dem)	D. J. Sandiford (Lib Dem)
1994	A. Jones (Lib Dem)	A. Firth (Lib Dem)	D. J. Sandiford (Lib Dem)
1995	A. Jones (Lib Dem)	A. Firth (Lib Dem)	A. Simcock (Lab)
1996	A. Jones (Lib Dem)	A. Firth (Lib Dem)	A. Simcock (Lab)
1998	A. Jones (Lib Dem)	A. Firth (Lib Dem)	A. Simcock (Lab)
1999	A. Jones (Lib Dem)	A. Firth (Lib Dem)	B. Jones (Lib Dem)
2000	A. Jones (Lib Dem)	A. Firth (Lib Dem)	B. Jones (Lib Dem)
2002	A. Jones (Lib Dem)	A. Firth (Lib Dem)	B. Jones (Lib Dem)
2003	A. Jones (Lib Dem)	A. Firth (Lib Dem)	B. Jones (Lib Dem)
2004	Audrey Jones (Lib Dem)	Alison Firth (Lib Dem)	Helen Jones (Lib Dem)
2006	Audrey Jones (Lib Dem)	Alison Firth (Lib Dem)	Simon Wheale (Lib Dem)
2007	Audrey Jones (Lib Dem)	Alison Firth (Lib Dem)	Simon Wheale (Lib Dem)
2008	Brendon Jones (Lib Dem)	Alison Firth (Lib Dem)	Simon Wheale (Lib Dem)
2010	Brendon Jones (Lib Dem)	Alison Firth (Lib Dem)	Simon Wheale (Lib Dem)
2011	Brendon Jones (Lib Dem)	Chris Paul (Lab)	Simon Wheale (Lib Dem)
2012	Daniel Gillard (Lab)	Chris Paul (Lab)	Simon Wheale (Lib Dem)
2014	Daniel Gillard (Lab)	Chris Paul (Lab)	Rebecca Moore (Lab)
2015	Daniel Gillard (Lab)	Chris Paul (Lab)	Rebecca Moore (Lab)
2016	Chris Wills (Lab)	Chris Paul (Lab)	Rebecca Moore (Lab)
2018	Rebecca Moore (Lab)	Chris Wills (Lab)	Chris Paul (Lab)
2019	Rebecca Moore (Lab)	Chris Wills (Lab)	Becky Chambers (Lab)
2021	Rebecca Moore (Lab)	Chris Wills (Lab)	Becky Chambers (Lab)
2022	Angela Gartside (Lab)	Chris Wills (Lab)	Becky Chambers (Lab)
2023	Angela Gartside (Lab)	Chris Wills (Lab)	Becky Chambers (Lab)
2024	Angela Gartside (Lab)	Chris Wills (Lab)	Becky Chambers (Lab)
2026	Beth Hartness (Grn)	Chris Wills (Lab)	Becky Chambers (Lab)

== Elections ==
=== Elections in 2020s ===
==== May 2026 ====
2026
Party	Candidate	Votes	%	±%
Green	Beth Hartness	1,604	40.8	+31.4
Liberal Democrats	April Preston	1,056	26.9	−12.9
Labour	Angela Gartside*	843	21.5	−26.0
Reform	Charlie Southwood	362	9.2	N/A
Conservative	Sarah Garcia de Bustos	64	1.6	−1.1
Majority		548	13.9	N/A
Turnout		3,929	36.6	+7.2
Green gain from Labour		Swing		

==== May 2024 ====
2024
Party	Candidate	Votes	%	±%
Labour Co-op	Chris Wills*	1,614	44.1	10.1 ▼
Liberal Democrats	April Preston	1,082	29.6	2.7 ▼
Green	Sam Easterby-Smith	835	22.8	13.3 ▲
Conservative	Akbar Arif	99	2.7	1.3 ▼
Majority		532	14.5	
Rejected ballots		31	0.8	
Turnout		3,661	33.2	
Registered electors		11,026		
Labour Co-op hold		Swing	3.7 ▼	

==== May 2023 ====
2023
Party	Candidate	Votes	%	±%
Labour	Becky Chambers*	1,673	54.4	9.8 ▲
Liberal Democrats	April Preston	909	29.5	10.3 ▼
Green	Sam Easterby-Smith	388	12.6	3.2 ▲
Conservative	Benjamin Harvey Spencer	108	3.5	0.8 ▲
Majority		764		
Rejected ballots		15		
Turnout		3,078	29.66	
Registered electors		10,377		
Labour hold		Swing		

==== May 2022 ====
2022
Party	Candidate	Votes	%	±%
Labour	Angela Gartside	1,525	47.5	11.4 ▼
Liberal Democrats	April Preston	1,279	39.8	6.8 ▲
Green	Sam Easterby-Smith	303	9.4	6.0 ▼
Conservative	Michael Barnes	87	2.7	1.9 ▼
Majority		246	7.7	
Rejected ballots		17		
Turnout		3,211	29.4	1.1 ▼
Registered electors		10,931		
Labour hold		Swing	9.1 ▼	

==== May 2021 ====
2021
Party	Candidate	Votes	%	±%
Labour Co-op	Chris Wills*	2,146	54.2	▲5.1
Liberal Democrats	April Preston	1,277	32.3	▼0.8
Green	Sam Easterby-Smith	377	9.5	▼5.9
Conservative	Cameron Cosh	158	4.0	▼0.5
Majority		869	21.9	
Rejected ballots		23	0.6	
Turnout		3,981	34.1	▲3.6
Registered electors		11,718		
Labour Co-op hold		Swing	▲3.0	

=== Elections in 2010s ===
==== May 2019 ====
2019
Party	Candidate	Votes	%	±%
Labour	Becky Chambers	1,442	44.6	▼11.5
Liberal Democrats	April Preston	1,339	41.4	▲8.4
Green	Nathan Rae	331	10.2	▼5.2
Conservative	Shaden Jaradat	101	3.1	▼1.5
Majority		103	3.2	▼10.6
Rejected ballots		21	0.65	
Turnout		3,234	31.27	▲0.77
Registered electors		10,341		
Labour hold		Swing	▼9.5	

==== May 2018 ====
2018 (3 vacancies; new boundaries)
Party	Candidate	Votes	%	±%
Labour	Rebecca Moore*	1,987	58.9	
Labour Co-op	Chris Wills*	1,656	49.1	
Labour Co-op	Chris Paul*	1,577	46.8	
Liberal Democrats	April Preston	1,112	33.0	
Liberal Democrats	Alex Warren	1,026	30.4	
Liberal Democrats	Phil Manktelow	1,014	30.1	
Green	Adam King	519	15.4	
Conservative	Shaden Jaradat	154	4.6	
Conservative	Peter Harrop	149	4.4	
Conservative	Avigail Walker	116	3.4	
Majority		465	13.8	
Rejected ballots		12 (full); 2 (partial)		
Turnout		3,372	30.5	
Registered electors		11,057		
Labour win (new boundaries)				
Labour Co-op win (new boundaries)				
Labour Co-op win (new boundaries)				

==== May 2016 ====
2016
Party	Candidate	Votes	%	±%
Labour Co-op	Chris Wills	1,683	55.25	
Liberal Democrats	Simon David Wheale	844	27.71	
Green	Lucy Jane Bannister	370	12.15	
Conservative	Shaden Jaradat	113	3.71	
TUSC	Zoe Brunswick	36	1.18	
Majority		839	27.54	
Turnout		3,046	31.47	
Labour hold		Swing		

==== May 2015 ====
2015
Party	Candidate	Votes	%	±%
Labour Co-op	Chris Paul*	3,032	47.3	+3.5
Liberal Democrats	Simon David Wheale	1,382	21.6	−12.8
Green	Harriet Emilia Pugh	1,272	19.9	+4.7
Conservative	Shaden Jaradat	621	9.6	+3.0
TUSC	Mercedes Caccia Mesorio	102	1.6	N/A
Majority		1,650	25.7	
Turnout		6,409	65.1	+35.3
Labour Co-op hold		Swing		

==== May 2014 ====
2014
Party	Candidate	Votes	%	±%
Labour	Rebecca Moore	1,386	40.75	
Liberal Democrats	Simon David Wheale*	1,098	32.28	
Green	Laura Bannister	657	19.32	
Conservative	Peter Jacques Werner	194	5.70	
TUSC	Liam David Curless	66	1.94	
Majority		288	8.5	
Turnout		3,401	30.34	
Labour gain from Liberal Democrats		Swing		

==== May 2012 ====
2012
Party	Candidate	Votes	%	±%
Labour	Daniel Gillard	1,107	46.6	+23.5
Liberal Democrats	Brendon Jones*	862	36.3	−21.4
Green	Laura Bannister	251	10.6	−0.4
Conservative	Lorna McHugh	88	3.7	−5.4
UKIP	James Howson	68	2.9	N/A
Majority		245	10	
Turnout		2,376	21	
Labour gain from Liberal Democrats		Swing		

==== May 2011 ====
2011
Party	Candidate	Votes	%	±%
Labour Co-op	Chris Paul	1,476	43.8	+21.3
Liberal Democrats	Alison Firth*	1,161	34.4	−26.3
Green	Laura Bannister	513	15.2	+5.5
Conservative	Shumaila Malik	223	6.6	−0.5
Majority		315	9.3	
Turnout		3,373	29.8	
Labour gain from Liberal Democrats		Swing		

==== May 2010 ====
2010
Party	Candidate	Votes	%	±%
Liberal Democrats	Simon David Wheale*	2,849	51.4	−6.3
Labour Co-op	Chris Paul	1,558	28.1	+5.0
Conservative	Shumaila Malik	600	10.8	+1.7
Green	Laura Alice Bannister	534	9.6	−0.6
Majority		1,291	23.3	−11.2
Turnout		5,541	50.6	+30.0
Liberal Democrats hold		Swing	-5.6	

=== Elections in 2000s ===
==== May 2008 ====
2008
Party	Candidate	Votes	%	±%
Liberal Democrats	Brendon Jones	1,267	57.7	−3.0
Labour	Leif Jerram	508	23.1	+0.6
Green	Felicity Paris	223	10.2	+0.5
Conservative	Zoe Slater	199	9.1	+2.0
Majority		759	34.5	−3.7
Turnout		2,197	20.6	−0.9
Liberal Democrats hold		Swing	-1.8	

==== May 2007 ====
2007
Party	Candidate	Votes	%	±%
Liberal Democrats	Alison Firth*	1,346	60.7	+12.9
Labour	Andrew Simcock	499	22.5	−5.1
Green	Felicity Paris	216	9.7	−5.6
Conservative	Adele Douglas	157	7.1	−2.2
Majority		847	38.2	+17.9
Turnout		2,218	21.5	−0.8
Liberal Democrats hold		Swing	+9.0	

==== May 2006 ====
2006
Party	Candidate	Votes	%	±%
Liberal Democrats	Simon David Wheale	1,064	47.8	−10.6
Labour	Delores Elizabeth Long	613	27.6	+9.0
Green	Sarah Stuart	340	15.3	+0.9
Conservative	Andrew Christopher Perfect	207	9.3	+0.7
Majority		451	20.3	−19.5
Turnout		2,224	22.3	−8.4
Liberal Democrats hold		Swing	-9.8	

==== June 2004 ====
2004 (3 vacancies; new boundaries)
Party	Candidate	Votes	%	±%
Liberal Democrats	Audrey Jones*	1,811	61.4	
Liberal Democrats	Alison Firth*	1,747	59.2	
Liberal Democrats	Helen Jones	1,537	52.1	
Labour	Gerard Collier	578	19.6	
Labour	Mark Bowcock	509	17.2	
Green	Gregory Griffin	446	15.1	
Labour	Steve Nuttall	439	14.9	
Green	Bushra Hussain	409	13.9	
Conservative	Andrew Perfect	267	9.0	
Majority		959	32.5	
Turnout		2,951	30.7	
Liberal Democrats win (new seat)				
Liberal Democrats win (new seat)				
Liberal Democrats win (new seat)				

==== May 2003 ====
2003
Party	Candidate	Votes	%	±%
Liberal Democrats	Brendon Jones*	1,621	61.6	+0.1
Labour	Gerard Collier	593	22.5	−1.7
Socialist Alliance	Rachel Green	149	5.7	+2.5
Conservative	Stuart Penketh	145	5.5	+0.4
Green	Bushra Hussain	125	4.7	−1.3
Majority		1,028	39.0	+1.7
Turnout		2,633	21.6	−2.1
Liberal Democrats hold		Swing	+0.9	

==== May 2002 ====
2002
Party	Candidate	Votes	%	±%
Liberal Democrats	Audrey Jones*	1,822	61.5	+0.2
Labour	Kate Torkington	717	24.2	+1.2
Green	June Buchan	178	6.0	−1.7
Conservative	Jonathan Smith	152	5.1	−3.0
Socialist Alliance	Toby Gibbons	96	3.2	+3.2
Majority		1,105	37.3	−1.0
Turnout		2,965	23.7	+1.8
Liberal Democrats hold		Swing	-0.5	

==== May 2000 ====
2000
Party	Candidate	Votes	%	±%
Liberal Democrats	Alison Firth*	1,586	61.3	+3.9
Labour	Pamela Smyth	595	23.0	−8.7
Conservative	Jonathan Smith	209	8.1	+2.3
Green	Susan Thorpe	198	7.7	+2.5
Majority		991	38.3	+12.6
Turnout		2,588	21.9	−4.1
Liberal Democrats hold		Swing	+6.3	

=== Elections in 1990s ===
==== May 1999 ====
1999
Party	Candidate	Votes	%	±%
Liberal Democrats	Brendon Jones	1,793	57.4	−3.8
Labour	Andrew Simcock*	990	31.7	+2.7
Conservative	Jonathan Smith	181	5.8	−1.2
Green	Jane Hutchings	162	5.2	+5.2
Majority		803	25.7	−6.5
Turnout		3,126	26.0	
Liberal Democrats gain from Labour		Swing	-3.2	

==== May 1998 ====
1998
Party	Candidate	Votes	%	±%
Liberal Democrats	Audrey Jones*	1,943	61.2	+8.0
Labour	Isobel Freeman	921	29.0	−8.3
Conservative	Muhammed Naqui	222	7.0	+0.9
Socialist Labour	Janice Whitehead	90	2.8	+2.8
Majority		1,022	32.2	+16.3
Turnout		3,176		
Liberal Democrats hold		Swing	+8.1	

==== May 1996 ====
1996
Party	Candidate	Votes	%	±%
Liberal Democrats	Alison Firth*	2,187	53.2	+10.1
Labour	Joanne Green	1,532	37.3	−7.1
Conservative	J. Callaghan	249	6.1	−2.5
Green	Bernard Ekbery	142	3.5	−0.5
Majority		655	15.9	+14.5
Turnout		4,110		
Liberal Democrats hold		Swing	+8.6	

==== May 1995 ====
1995
Party	Candidate	Votes	%	±%
Labour	Andrew Simcock	1,816	44.4	+5.1
Liberal Democrats	David Sandiford*	1,760	43.1	−6.1
Conservative	J. Callaghan	350	8.6	+1.0
Green	Bernard Ekbery	162	4.0	+0.0
Majority		56	1.4	−8.4
Turnout		4,088		
Labour gain from Liberal Democrats		Swing	+5.6	

==== May 1994 ====
1994
Party	Candidate	Votes	%	±%
Liberal Democrats	A. Jones*	2,238	49.2	+4.7
Labour	A. Simcock	1,791	39.3	+10.1
Conservative	C. Brown	344	7.6	−13.3
Green	B. Ekbery	180	4.0	−1.4
Majority		447	9.8	−5.5
Turnout		4,553		
Liberal Democrats hold		Swing	-2.7	

==== May 1992 ====
1992
Party	Candidate	Votes	%	±%
Liberal Democrats	A. Firth*	1,642	44.5	+2.2
Labour	H. Smith	1,078	29.2	−4.7
Conservative	P. Davies	769	20.9	+3.5
Green	B. Ekbery	199	5.4	−1.1
Majority		564	15.3	+7.0
Turnout		3,688		
Liberal Democrats hold		Swing	+3.4	

==== May 1991 ====
1991
Party	Candidate	Votes	%	±%
Liberal Democrats	D. J. Sandiford*	2,001	42.3	−1.1
Labour	G. Betney	1,606	33.9	−2.6
Conservative	P. W. Davies	823	17.4	+3.4
Green	B. J. Ekbery	306	6.5	+0.3
Majority		395	8.3	+1.4
Turnout		4,736	44.8	
Liberal Democrats hold		Swing	+0.7	

==== May 1990 ====
1990
Party	Candidate	Votes	%	±%
Liberal Democrats	A. Jones*	2,251	43.4	+4.0
Labour	G. P. Ballance	1,892	36.5	+4.6
Conservative	G. H. R. Betton	724	14.0	−14.7
Green	B. J. Ekbery	319	6.2	+6.2
Majority		359	6.9	−0.7
Turnout		5,186		
Liberal Democrats hold		Swing	-0.3	

=== Elections in 1980s ===
==== May 1988 ====
1988
Party	Candidate	Votes	%	±%
SLD	A. Firth*	1,932	39.4	−5.5
Labour	A. D. R. Eko	1,561	31.9	+4.4
Conservative	A. J. Elleray	1,405	28.7	+3.9
Majority		371	7.6	−9.7
Turnout		4,898		
SLD hold		Swing	-4.9	

==== May 1987 ====
1987
Party	Candidate	Votes	%	±%
Liberal	David Sandiford*	2,631	44.9	+2.3
Labour	David Silkin	1,614	27.5	−7.4
Conservative	Anthony Elleray	1,457	24.8	+5.3
Green	Guy Otten	163	2.8	−0.2
Majority		1,017	17.3	+9.6
Turnout		5,865		
Liberal hold		Swing	+4.8	

==== May 1986 ====
1986
Party	Candidate	Votes	%	±%
Liberal	A. Jones*	2,240	42.6	+6.3
Labour	K. Matthews	1,834	34.9	+0.4
Conservative	J. Jacobs	1,024	19.5	−9.8
Green	G. Otten	156	3.0	+3.0
Majority		406	7.7	+5.9
Turnout		5,254		
Liberal hold		Swing	+2.9	

==== May 1984 ====
1984
Party	Candidate	Votes	%	±%
Liberal	A. Firth	1,940	36.3	−5.7
Labour	Graham Martin	1,845	34.5	+12.8
Conservative	Joan Jacobs*	1,566	29.3	−7.0
Majority		95	1.8	−3.9
Turnout		5,351		
Liberal gain from Conservative		Swing	-9.2	

==== May 1983 ====
1983
Party	Candidate	Votes	%	±%
Liberal	David Sandiford	2,147	42.0	+1.4
Conservative	Margaret Davies*	1,854	36.3	−3.1
Labour	Raymond Write	1,111	21.7	+1.7
Majority		293	5.7	+4.5
Turnout		5,112		
Liberal gain from Conservative		Swing	+2.2	

==== May 1982 ====
1982 (3 vacancies; new boundaries)
Party	Candidate	Votes	%	±%
Liberal	Audrey Jones*	2,043	40.5	
Conservative	Joan Jacobs*	1,981	39.3	
Conservative	Margaret Davies	1,854	36.7	
Liberal	David Sandiford*	1,836	36.4	
Conservative	Muriel Pierce	1,828	36.2	
Liberal	Graham Shaw	1,675	33.2	
Labour	Frank Booth	1,006	19.9	
Labour	Karl Grimshaw	991	19.6	
Labour	Adetutu Eko	929	18.4	
Majority		18	0.4	
Turnout		5,047	49.8	
Liberal win (new seat)				
Conservative win (new seat)				
Conservative win (new seat)				

==== May 1980 ====
1980
Party	Candidate	Votes	%	±%
Conservative	J. M. Jacobs	1,762	34.7	−1.3
Liberal	J. Edwards	1,709	33.6	−5.3
Labour	W. M. Jameson	1,610	31.7	+6.6
Majority		53	1.0	−1.8
Turnout		5,081	45.6	−27.7
Conservative hold		Swing	+2.0	

=== Elections in 1970s ===
==== May 1979 ====
1979
Party	Candidate	Votes	%	±%
Liberal	D. Sandiford	3,116	38.9	+6.7
Conservative	J. M. Jacobs	2,889	36.0	−6.6
Labour	J. Finnegan	2,009	25.1	−0.1
Majority		227	2.8	−7.5
Turnout		8,014	73.3	+34.5
Liberal gain from Conservative		Swing	+6.6	

==== November 1978 (by-election) ====
By-election: 16 November 1978
Party	Candidate	Votes	%	±%
Liberal	Audrey Jones	2,137	52.8	+20.6
Conservative	James Hill	1,297	32.1	−10.5
Labour	Alfred Home	610	15.1	−10.1
Majority		840	20.8	+10.5
Turnout		4,044	33.9	−4.9
Liberal gain from Conservative		Swing	+15.5	

==== May 1978 ====
1978
Party	Candidate	Votes	%	±%
Conservative	E. R. Coker*	1,971	42.6	−12.4
Liberal	A. Jones	1,492	32.2	+13.5
Labour	F. Yaffe	1,169	25.2	−0.2
Majority		479	10.3	−19.3
Turnout		4,632	38.8	
Conservative hold		Swing	-12.9	

==== May 1976 ====
1976
Party	Candidate	Votes	%	±%
Conservative	G. W. Young*	2,657	55.0	+5.7
Labour	D. Healey	1,226	25.4	+4.6
Liberal	J. Edwards	905	18.7	−11.2
Independent	E. N. Goodyear	47	1.0	+1.0
Majority		1,431	29.6	+10.2
Turnout		4,835		
Conservative hold		Swing	+0.5	

==== May 1975 ====
1975
Party	Candidate	Votes	%	±%
Conservative	W. Crabtree*	2,162	49.3	+1.2
Liberal	J. Edwards	1,311	29.9	+0.2
Labour	C. Scott	911	20.8	−1.4
Majority		851	19.4	+1.0
Turnout		4,384		
Conservative hold		Swing	+0.5	

==== May 1973 ====
1973 (3 vacancies; reorganisation)
Party	Candidate	Votes	%	±%
Conservative	E. R. Coker*	1,864	47.9	−0.4
Conservative	G. W. Young*	1,801	46.3	−2.0
Conservative	W. Crabtree*	1,793	46.1	−2.2
Liberal	J. Edwards	1,151	29.6	+4.4
Liberal	R. A. Bell	1,107	28.5	+3.3
Liberal	W. J. Ellwood	1,102	28.3	+3.1
Labour	J. Wilner	858	22.1	−4.4
Labour	M. Moss	855	22.0	−4.5
Labour	R. Ames	797	20.5	−6.0
Majority		642	16.5	+8.7
Turnout		3,889		
Conservative hold		Swing		
Conservative hold		Swing		
Conservative hold		Swing		

==== May 1972 ====
1972
Party	Candidate	Votes	%	±%
Conservative	G. W. Young*	2,254	48.3	+0.9
Labour	C. A. Hassall	1,238	26.5	−8.2
Liberal	J. L. Edwards	1,174	25.2	+0.9
Majority		357	7.8	+0.9
Turnout		4,666		
Conservative hold		Swing		

==== May 1971 ====
1971 (3 vacancies; new boundaries)
Party	Candidate	Votes	%	±%
Conservative	E. R. Coker*	2,387	46.4	
Conservative	W. Crabtree*	2,233	43.4	
Conservative	G. W. Young*	2,140	41.6	
Labour	R. K. Litherland	1,783	34.7	
Labour	H. Reid	1,758	34.2	
Labour	C. W. Warwood	1,689	32.9	
Liberal	J. S. Alldridge	1,247	24.3	
Liberal	J. L. Edwards	1,044	20.3	
Liberal	J. A. Hamilton	948	18.4	
Communist	J. Frankenberg	191	3.7	
Majority		357	6.9	
Turnout		5,140		
Conservative win (new seat)				
Conservative win (new seat)				
Conservative win (new seat)				

==== May 1970 ====
1970
Party	Candidate	Votes	%	±%
Conservative	W. Crabtree*	2,209	51.5	−7.9
Labour	G. Hall	1,048	24.4	+12.4
Liberal	G. Fawdrey	1,012	23.6	−5.0
Residents	W. Paton	22	0.5	N/A
Majority		1,161	27.1	−3.8
Turnout		4,291		
Conservative hold		Swing		

=== Elections in 1960s ===
==== May 1969 ====
1969
Party	Candidate	Votes	%	±%
Conservative	E. R. Coker*	2,522	59.4	+2.1
Liberal	G. Fawdrey	1,212	28.6	−0.3
Labour	J. L. Shelmerdine	510	12.0	−1.8
Majority		1,310	30.9	+2.5
Turnout		4,244		
Conservative hold		Swing		

==== May 1968 ====
1968
Party	Candidate	Votes	%	±%
Conservative	G. W. Young*	2,496	57.3	−2.6
Liberal	K. Pinnock	1,258	28.9	+2.4
Labour	D. G. Clark	603	13.8	+0.2
Majority		1,238	28.4	−5.0
Turnout		4,357		
Conservative hold		Swing		

==== May 1967 ====
1967
Party	Candidate	Votes	%	±%
Conservative	W. Crabtree*	2,460	59.9	+12.1
Liberal	K. Pinnock	1,088	26.5	−11.3
Labour	R. K. Litherland	561	13.6	−0.8
Majority		1,372	33.4	+23.4
Turnout		4,109		
Conservative hold		Swing		

==== May 1966 ====
1966
Party	Candidate	Votes	%	±%
Conservative	E. R. Coker*	2,150	47.8	−0.8
Liberal	J. S. Alldridge	1,701	37.8	−2.1
Labour	A. A. Smith	645	14.4	+2.9
Majority		449	10.0	+1.3
Turnout		4,496		
Conservative hold		Swing		

==== May 1965 ====
1965
Party	Candidate	Votes	%	±%
Conservative	G. W. Young	2,403	48.6	+2.9
Liberal	J. S. Alldridge*	1,975	39.9	−2.5
Labour	H. Barrett	567	11.5	−0.4
Majority		428	8.7	+5.3
Turnout		4,945		
Conservative gain from Liberal		Swing		

==== May 1964 ====
1964
Party	Candidate	Votes	%	±%
Conservative	W. Crabtree	2,242	45.7	+3.3
Liberal	A. Angel	2,077	42.4	+1.4
Labour	W. J. Shaw	582	11.9	−4.7
Majority		165	3.3	+1.9
Turnout		4,901		
Conservative hold		Swing		

==== May 1963 ====
1963
Party	Candidate	Votes	%	±%
Conservative	E. R. Coker*	2,219	42.4	−0.8
Liberal	A. Angel	2,145	41.0	−6.2
Labour	C. Creveul	866	16.6	+7.0
Majority		74	1.4	
Turnout		5,230		
Conservative hold		Swing		

==== May 1962 ====
1962
Party	Candidate	Votes	%	±%
Liberal	J. S. Alldridge	2,574	47.2	+4.3
Conservative	W. H. Scholfield*	2,357	43.2	−3.7
Labour	A. J. Bateman	523	9.6	−0.6
Majority		217	4.0	
Turnout		5,454		
Liberal gain from Conservative		Swing		

==== May 1961 ====
1961
Party	Candidate	Votes	%	±%
Conservative	J. McGrath*	2,211	46.9	−8.5
Liberal	J. S. Alldridge	2,019	42.9	+6.8
Labour	B. Atkinson	481	10.2	+1.7
Majority		192	4.0	−15.3
Turnout		4,711		
Conservative hold		Swing		

==== May 1960 ====
1960
Party	Candidate	Votes	%	±%
Conservative	E. R. Coker	2,504	55.4	+0.4
Liberal	A. Share	1,631	36.1	+2.4
Labour	J. Platt	386	8.5	−2.8
Majority		873	19.3	−2.0
Turnout		4,521		
Conservative hold		Swing		

=== Elections in 1950s ===
==== May 1959 ====
1959
Party	Candidate	Votes	%	±%
Conservative	W. H. Scholfield*	2,808	55.0	+7.0
Liberal	A. Share	1,717	33.7	−4.6
Labour	J. Platt	577	11.3	−2.4
Majority		1,091	21.3	+11.6
Turnout		5,102		
Conservative hold		Swing		

==== May 1958 ====
1958
Party	Candidate	Votes	%	±%
Conservative	J. McGrath*	2,247	48.0	−26.9
Liberal	A. Share	1,792	38.3	N/A
Labour	J. Platt	645	13.7	−11.4
Majority		455	9.7	−40.1
Turnout		4,684		
Conservative hold		Swing		

==== May 1957 ====
1957
Party	Candidate	Votes	%	±%
Conservative	W. A. Stovell*	2,522	74.9	+3.4
Labour	A. Haslam	844	25.1	−3.4
Majority		1,678	49.8	+6.8
Turnout		3,366		
Conservative hold		Swing		

==== May 1956 ====
1956
Party	Candidate	Votes	%	±%
Conservative	W. H. Scholfield*	2,089	71.5	−11.7
Labour	N. Selwyn	834	28.5	+11.7
Majority		1,255	43.0	−23.4
Turnout		2,923		
Conservative hold		Swing		

==== May 1955 ====
1955
Party	Candidate	Votes	%	±%
Conservative	J. McGrath*	3,415	83.2	+2.3
Labour	H. Jenkins	692	16.8	−2.3
Majority		2,723	66.4	+4.6
Turnout		4,107		
Conservative hold		Swing		

==== May 1954 ====
1954
Party	Candidate	Votes	%	±%
Conservative	W. A. Stovell*	3,256	80.9	+0.5
Labour	F. O'Rourke	771	19.1	−0.5
Majority		2,485	61.8	+1.0
Turnout		4,588		
Conservative hold		Swing		

==== May 1953 ====
1953
Party	Candidate	Votes	%	±%
Conservative	W. H. Scholfield*	3,689	80.4	+12.5
Labour	R. L. Griffiths	899	19.6	+0.6
Majority		2,790	60.8	+11.9
Turnout		4,588		
Conservative hold		Swing		

==== May 1952 ====
1952
Party	Candidate	Votes	%	±%
Conservative	J. McGrath*	3,686	67.9	−2.1
Labour	W. Lister	1,029	19.0	+3.0
Liberal	F. W. Wilson	713	13.1	−0.9
Majority		2,657	48.9	−5.1
Turnout		5,428		
Conservative hold		Swing		

==== May 1951 ====
1951
Party	Candidate	Votes	%	±%
Conservative	W. A. Stovell*	3,917	70.0	−1.7
Labour	N. Morris	896	16.0	−2.2
Liberal	F. W. Wilson	780	14.0	+3.9
Majority		3,021	54.0	+0.5
Turnout		5,593		
Conservative hold		Swing		

==== May 1950 ====
1950 (new boundaries)
Party	Candidate	Votes	%	±%
Conservative	W. H. Scholfield*	3,933	71.7	
Labour	N. Morris	999	18.2	
Liberal	F. W. Wilson	550	10.1	
Majority		2,934	53.5	
Turnout		5,482		
Conservative hold		Swing		

=== Elections in 1940s ===
==== May 1949 ====
1949
Party	Candidate	Votes	%	±%
Conservative	G. Lord*	10,713	56.8	−4.9
Labour	J. W. Upton	5,539	39.4	−0.6
Liberal	A. J. Higson	2,608	13.8	+5.5
Majority		5,174	27.4	−4.3
Turnout		18,860		
Conservative hold		Swing		

==== November 1947 ====
1947
Party	Candidate	Votes	%	±%
Conservative	H. Bentley*	13,817	61.7	+7.3
Labour	F. H. Robinson	6,712	30.0	−5.3
Liberal	A. J. Higson	1,869	8.3	−2.0
Majority		7,105	31.7	+12.6
Turnout		22,398		
Conservative hold		Swing		

==== November 1946 ====
1946
Party	Candidate	Votes	%	±%
Conservative	W. H. Scholfield*	9,233	54.4	+10.2
Labour	F. H. Robinson	5,984	35.3	−6.4
Liberal	A. J. Higson	1,750	10.3	−3.9
Majority		3,249	19.1	+18.3
Turnout		16,967		
Conservative hold		Swing		

==== November 1945 ====
1945 (2 vacancies)
Party	Candidate	Votes	%	±%
Conservative	G. Lord*	6,555	44.2	−16.5
Conservative	H. Bentley*	6,297	42.5	−18.2
Labour	F. H. Robinson	6,178	41.7	+2.4
Labour	E. C. Gates	5,909	39.8	+0.5
Liberal	C. A. Curtis	2,101	14.2	N/A
Liberal	F. R. Cann	1,918	12.9	N/A
Majority		119	0.8	−20.6
Turnout		14,834	40.2	
Conservative hold		Swing		
Conservative hold		Swing		

=== Elections in 1930s ===
==== November 1938 ====
1938
Party	Candidate	Votes	%	±%
Conservative	J. S. Hill*	5,492	60.7	+21.7
Labour	C. S. Hammersley	3,552	39.3	+13.2
Majority		1,940	21.4	+17.3
Turnout		9,044		
Conservative hold		Swing		

==== November 1937 ====
1937
Party	Candidate	Votes	%	±%
Conservative	W. H. Scholfield	4,083	39.0	−1.6
Liberal	A. P. Simon	3,648	34.9	+3.4
Labour	D. Hunter	2,732	26.1	−1.8
Majority		435	4.1	−5.0
Turnout		10,463		
Conservative gain from Liberal		Swing		

==== November 1936 ====
1936
Party	Candidate	Votes	%	±%
Conservative	R. S. Woffenden	3,922	40.6	−22.4
Liberal	A. P. Simon*	3,038	31.5	N/A
Labour	F. Edwards	2,698	27.9	−9.1
Majority		884	9.1	−16.9
Turnout		9,658		
Conservative gain from Liberal		Swing		

==== November 1935 ====
1935
Party	Candidate	Votes	%	±%
Conservative	J. S. Hill*	5,405	63.0	N/A
Labour	F. Edwards	3,175	37.0	−8.3
Majority		2,230	26.0	
Turnout		8,580		
Conservative hold		Swing		

==== November 1934 ====
1934
Party	Candidate	Votes	%	±%
Liberal	T. H. Davies*	3,119	54.7	−4.4
Labour	F. Edwards	2,584	45.3	+4.4
Majority		535	9.4	−8.8
Turnout		5,703		
Liberal hold		Swing		

==== November 1933 ====
1933
Party	Candidate	Votes	%	±%
Liberal	A. P. Simon*	3,167	59.1	N/A
Labour	F. Edwards	2,190	40.9	+11.9
Majority		977	18.2	
Turnout		5,357		
Liberal hold		Swing		

==== November 1932 ====
1932
Party	Candidate	Votes	%	±%
Conservative	J. S. Hill*	5,424	66.4	N/A
Labour	F. Edwards	2,370	29.0	N/A
Residents	G. O. Edwards	375	4.6	N/A
Majority		3,054	37.4	N/A
Turnout		8,169		
Conservative hold		Swing		

==== November 1931 ====
1931
Party	Candidate	Votes	%	±%
Liberal	T. H. Davis*	uncontested		
Liberal hold		Swing		

==== November 1930 ====
1930
Party	Candidate	Votes	%	±%
Liberal	A. P. Simon*	5,238	75.4	+25.8
Labour	A. McIlwrick	1,711	24.6	N/A
Majority		3,527	50.8	
Turnout		6,949		
Liberal hold		Swing		

=== Elections in 1920s ===
==== November 1929 ====
1929
Party	Candidate	Votes	%	±%
Conservative	J. S. Hill*	3,262	50.4	+2.5
Liberal	F. E. Tylecote	3,213	49.6	−1.2
Majority		49	0.8	
Turnout		6,475	34.8	−12.5
Conservative hold		Swing		

==== November 1928 ====
1928
Party	Candidate	Votes	%	±%
Liberal	T. Davis	3,226	50.8	−5.5
Conservative	W. Challoner*	3,042	47.9	+4.2
Residents	N. E. Walker	77	1.2	N/A
Majority		184	2.9	−9.7
Turnout		6,345	47.3	−2.7
Liberal gain from Conservative		Swing		

==== November 1927 ====
1927
Party	Candidate	Votes	%	±%
Liberal	A. P. Simon*	2,654	56.3	+16.3
Conservative	W. Hedley	2,060	43.7	−2.1
Majority		594	12.6	
Turnout		4,714	50.0	−12.2
Liberal hold		Swing		

==== November 1926 ====
1926
Party	Candidate	Votes	%	±%
Conservative	J. S. Hill	2,282	45.8	−3.9
Liberal	W. A. Lewins*	1,997	40.0	N/A
Labour	P. J. Wall	708	14.2	−3.8
Majority		235	5.8	+4.0
Turnout		4,327	62.2	−1.0
Conservative gain from Liberal		Swing		

==== November 1925 ====
1925
Party	Candidate	Votes	%	±%
Conservative	W. Challoner	1,813	41.9	−8.0
Independent	L. F. Massey*	1,734	40.1	N/A
Labour	W. Johnston	780	18.0	N/A
Majority		79	1.8	
Turnout		4,327	63.2	
Conservative gain from Independent		Swing		

==== November 1924 ====
1924
Party	Candidate	Votes	%	±%
Liberal	A. P. Simon	1,673	50.1	−5.2
Conservative	J. Mellor*	1,670	49.9	+5.2
Majority		3	0.2	
Turnout		3,343		
Liberal gain from Conservative		Swing		

==== November 1923 ====
1923
Party	Candidate	Votes	%	±%
Liberal	W. A. Lewins*	1,904	55.3	N/A
Conservative	K. W. Chambers	1,540	44.7	+4.2
Majority		364	10.6	
Turnout		3,444		
Liberal hold		Swing		

==== August 1923 (by-election) ====
By-election: 24 August 1923
Party	Candidate	Votes	%	±%
Liberal	W. A. Lewins	1,165	51.6	N/A
Conservative	K. W. Chambers	1,091	48.4	+7.9
Majority		74	3.2	
Turnout		2,256		
Liberal hold		Swing		

==== November 1922 ====
1922
Party	Candidate	Votes	%	±%
Independent	L. F. Massey*	1,592	48.7	+5.1
Conservative	F. Stapleton	1,325	40.5	−15.9
Labour	M. Dean	355	10.8	N/A
Majority		267	8.2	
Turnout		3,272	48.3	+1.7
Independent hold		Swing		

==== November 1921 ====
1921
Party	Candidate	Votes	%	±%
Conservative	J. Mellor	1,490	56.4	N/A
Independent	E. Brown	1,153	43.6	N/A
Majority		337	12.8	
Turnout		2,643	46.6	+1.7
Conservative gain from Liberal		Swing		

==== November 1920 ====
1920
Party	Candidate	Votes	%	±%
Liberal	J. C. Jones*	2,079	72.5	N/A
Labour	J. Williams	788	27.5	N/A
Majority		1,291	45.0	N/A
Turnout		2,867	44.9	N/A
Liberal hold		Swing		

=== Elections in 1910s ===
==== November 1919 ====
1919 (new boundaries)
Party	Candidate	Votes	%	±%
Independent	L. F. Massey*	uncontested		
Independent hold		Swing		

==== May 1919 (by-election) ====
By-election: 28 May 1919
Party	Candidate	Votes	%	±%
Independent	L. F. Massey	1,130	55.1	
Conservative	R. R. Shaw	556	27.1	
Labour	R. C. Wallhead	364	17.8	
Majority		574	28.0	
Turnout		2,050		
Independent gain from Conservative		Swing		

==== November 1914 ====
1914
Party	Candidate	Votes	%	±%
Independent	M. Ashton*	uncontested		
Independent hold		Swing		

==== November 1913 ====
1913
Party	Candidate	Votes	%	±%
Independent	J. C. Jones	931	54.3	N/A
Conservative	R. R. Shaw	782	45.7	N/A
Majority		149	8.6	N/A
Turnout		1,713		
Independent gain from Conservative		Swing		

==== November 1912 ====
1912
Party	Candidate	Votes	%	±%
Conservative	H. Derwent Simpson*	uncontested		
Conservative hold		Swing		

==== November 1911 ====
1911
Party	Candidate	Votes	%	±%
Independent	M. Ashton*	uncontested		
Independent hold		Swing		

==== November 1910 ====
1910
Party	Candidate	Votes	%	±%
Conservative	S. Edwards*	uncontested		
Conservative hold		Swing		

=== Elections in 1900s ===
==== November 1909 ====
1909
Party	Candidate	Votes	%	±%
Conservative	H. Derwent Simpson*	uncontested		
Conservative hold		Swing		

==== November 1908 ====
1908
Party	Candidate	Votes	%	±%
Independent	M. Ashton	760	53.3	N/A
Conservative	R. R. Shaw	666	46.7	−6.4
Majority		94	6.6	
Turnout		1,426		
Independent gain from Conservative		Swing		

==== November 1907 ====
1907
Party	Candidate	Votes	%	±%
Conservative	S. Edwards*	630	53.1	−6.9
Liberal	H. Vick	487	41.0	+1.0
Independent	A. E. Wachter	70	5.9	N/A
Majority		143	12.1	−7.9
Turnout		1,187		
Conservative hold		Swing		

==== November 1906 ====
1906
Party	Candidate	Votes	%	±%
Conservative	H. Derwent Simpson*	542	60.0	+22.7
Liberal	H. Vick	362	40.0	+3.6
Majority		180	20.0	+19.1
Turnout		904		
Conservative hold		Swing		

==== November 1905 ====
1905
Party	Candidate	Votes	%	±%
Conservative	H. King	429	37.3	−30.2
Liberal	R. Fleeson*	419	36.4	−17.0
Independent	R. R. Shaw	303	26.3	−10.4
Majority		10	0.9	
Turnout		1,151		
Conservative gain from Liberal		Swing		

==== November 1904 ====
1904 (3 vacancies)
Party	Candidate	Votes	%	±%
Conservative	S. Edwards	618	67.5	
Conservative	H. Derwent Simpson	517	56.5	
Liberal	R. Fleeson	489	53.4	
Independent	R. R. Shaw	336	36.7	
Independent	A. Burgess	220	24.0	
Majority		153	16.7	
Turnout		915		
Conservative win (new seat)				
Conservative win (new seat)				
Liberal win (new seat)				

== See also ==
- Manchester City Council
- Manchester City Council elections
