= 1904 Manchester City Council election =

Local election in Manchester

- 1 November 1904

41 of 124 seats to Manchester City Council 63 seats needed for a majority
	First party	Second party	Third party
Party	Conservative	Liberal	Labour
Last election	11 seats, 35.9%	10 seats, 30.1%	4 seats, 21.0%
Seats before	50	45	6
Seats won	18	14	3
Seats after	56	52	8
Seat change	▲4	▲4	▲2
Popular vote	14,882	14,353	6,345
Percentage	33.3%	32.1%	14.2%
Swing	▼2.6%	▲2.0%	▼6.8%
	Fourth party	Fifth party
Party	Independent	Liberal Unionist
Last election	1 seats, 12.8%	0 seats, 4.0%
Seats before	2	1
Seats won	6	0
Seats after	7	1
Seat change	▲5	Steady
Popular vote	7,710	0
Percentage	17.3%	0.0%
Swing	▲4.5%	▼4.0%
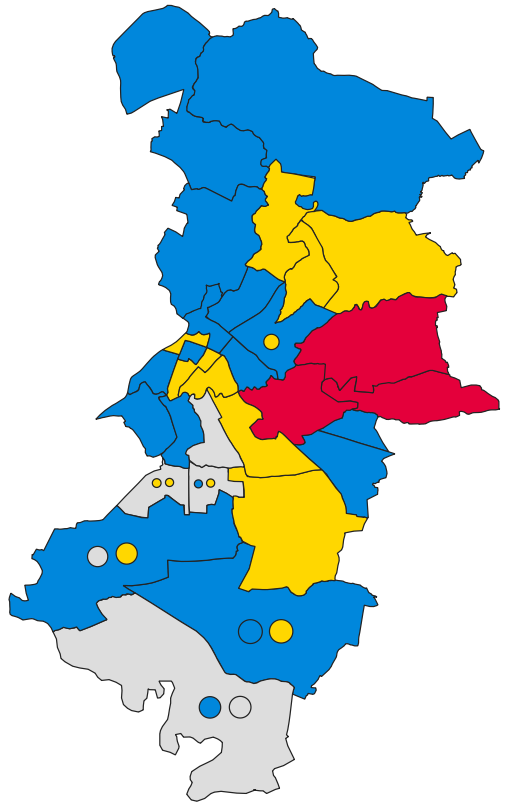
- Map of results of 1904 election
Leader of the Council before election
No overall control
Leader of the Council after election
No overall control

Elections to Manchester City Council were held on Tuesday, 1 November 1904. One third of the councillors seats were up for election, with each successful candidate to serve a three-year term of office. Owing to the extension of the city's boundaries, five new wards (Chorlton-cum-Hardy, Didsbury, Moss Side East, Moss Side West, and Withington) elected all of their councillors for the first time.

The council remained under no overall control.

== Election result ==
Party	Votes		Seats			Full Council	
Conservative Party	14,882 (33.3%)	▼2.6	18 (43.9%)	18 / 41	▲4	56 (45.2%)	56 / 124
Liberal Party	14,353 (32.1%)	▲2.0	14 (34.1%)	14 / 41	▲4	52 (41.9%)	52 / 124
Labour Party	6,345 (14.2%)	▼6.8	3 (7.3%)	3 / 41	▲2	8 (6.5%)	8 / 124
Independent	7,710 (17.3%)	▲4.5	6 (14.6%)	6 / 41	▲5	7 (5.6%)	7 / 124
Liberal Unionist	0 (0.0%)	▼4.0	0 (0.0%)	0 / 41	Steady	1 (0.8%)	1 / 124
Irish Nationalist	1,369 (3.1%)	N/A	0 (0.0%)	0 / 41	N/A	0 (0.0%)	0 / 124

=== Full council ===
↓
8	52	7	1	56

=== Aldermen ===
↓
19	1	11

=== Councillors ===
↓
8	33	7	45

== Ward results ==
=== All Saints' ===
All Saints'
Party	Candidate	Votes	%	±%
Independent	H. M. Ross Clyne	1,049	55.0	N/A
Liberal	M. Arrandale*	858	45.0	N/A
Majority		191	10.0	N/A
Turnout		1,907		
Independent gain from Liberal		Swing		

=== Ardwick ===
Ardwick
Party	Candidate	Votes	%	±%
Labour	T. Lowth	2,239	58.7	N/A
Conservative	J. E. Chapman	1,575	41.3	−2.7
Majority		664	17.4	
Turnout		3,814		
Labour gain from Conservative		Swing		

=== Blackley and Moston ===
Blackley and Moston
Party	Candidate	Votes	%	±%
Conservative	C. G. L. Skinner*	uncontested		
Conservative hold		Swing		

=== Bradford ===
Bradford
Party	Candidate	Votes	%	±%
Labour	T. Fox*	uncontested		
Labour hold		Swing		

=== Cheetham ===
Cheetham
Party	Candidate	Votes	%	±%
Conservative	J. Williams*	uncontested		
Conservative hold		Swing		

=== Chorlton-cum-Hardy ===
Chorlton-cum-Hardy (3 vacancies)
Party	Candidate	Votes	%	±%
Conservative	J. Turner	994	61.5	
Independent	E. Farrar	873	54.1	
Liberal	H. Kemp	816	50.5	
Liberal	R. B. Barningham	749	46.4	
Conservative	T. Wilson	721	44.6	
Liberal	H. Pilcher	690	42.7	
Majority		67	4.1	
Turnout		1,615		
Conservative win (new seat)				
Independent win (new seat)				
Liberal win (new seat)				

=== Collegiate Church ===
Collegiate Church
Party	Candidate	Votes	%	±%
Conservative	J. R. Smith*	567	53.5	N/A
Liberal	W. H. Thomas	493	46.5	N/A
Majority		74	7.0	N/A
Turnout		1,060		
Conservative hold		Swing		

=== Crumpsall ===
Crumpsall
Party	Candidate	Votes	%	±%
Conservative	W. F. Dearden*	uncontested		
Conservative hold		Swing		

=== Didsbury ===
Didsbury (3 vacancies)
Party	Candidate	Votes	%	±%
Independent	F. Moss	596	51.0	
Conservative	C. K. Mayor	595	50.9	
Independent	C. S. Edwards	566	48.5	
Independent	C. J. H. Gradisky	557	47.7	
Majority		9	0.8	
Turnout		1,168		
Independent win (new seat)				
Conservative win (new seat)				
Independent win (new seat)				

=== Exchange ===
Exchange
Party	Candidate	Votes	%	±%
Liberal	S. Cowan*	uncontested		
Liberal hold		Swing		

=== Harpurhey ===
Harpurhey
Party	Candidate	Votes	%	±%
Liberal	P. Whyman*	1,743	56.2	N/A
Independent	W. Brown	1,361	43.8	N/A
Majority		382	12.4	
Turnout		3,104		
Liberal hold		Swing		

=== Longsight ===
Longsight
Party	Candidate	Votes	%	±%
Conservative	J. R. Wilson*	1,011	51.0	N/A
Liberal	H. Hodkin	972	49.0	N/A
Majority		39	2.0	N/A
Turnout		1,983		
Conservative hold		Swing		

=== Medlock Street ===
Medlock Street
Party	Candidate	Votes	%	±%
Conservative	H. White	1,351	53.1	−5.9
Liberal	G. Jennison	1,195	46.9	+5.9
Majority		156	6.2	−11.8
Turnout		2,546		
Conservative hold		Swing		

=== Miles Platting ===
Miles Platting
Party	Candidate	Votes	%	±%
Liberal	J. Kemp*	1,148	55.5	N/A
Labour	J. E. Gilchrist	919	44.5	N/A
Majority		229	11.0	
Turnout		2,067		
Liberal hold		Swing		

=== Moss Side East ===
Moss Side East (3 vacancies)
Party	Candidate	Votes	%	±%
Independent	J. Stevenson	811	64.1	
Conservative	W. T. Dagnall	634	50.1	
Liberal	J. Bowie	590	46.6	
Liberal	J. Wynne	584	46.1	
Conservative	A. Gresty	573	45.3	
Majority		6	0.5	
Turnout		1,266		
Independent win (new seat)				
Conservative win (new seat)				
Liberal win (new seat)				

=== Moss Side West ===
Moss Side West (3 vacancies)
Party	Candidate	Votes	%	±%
Independent	A. Grierson	1,144	70.4	
Liberal	T. Herbert	826	50.8	
Liberal	W. Hynes	817	50.3	
Labour	J. Archer	776	47.8	
Conservative	J. H. Swales	695	42.8	
Liberal	J. Livesley	617	38.0	
Majority		41	2.5	
Turnout		1,625		
Independent win (new seat)				
Liberal win (new seat)				
Liberal win (new seat)				

=== New Cross ===
New Cross
Party	Candidate	Votes	%	±%
Conservative	J. Grime*	uncontested		
Liberal	G. Howarth*	uncontested		
Conservative hold		Swing		
Liberal hold		Swing		

=== Newton Heath ===
Newton Heath
Party	Candidate	Votes	%	±%
Liberal	W. Trevor*	uncontested		
Liberal hold		Swing		

=== Openshaw ===
Openshaw
Party	Candidate	Votes	%	±%
Labour	J. B. Williams	1,936	61.0	+0.3
Conservative	D. Taylor*	1,236	39.0	−0.3
Majority		700	22.0	+0.6
Turnout		3,172		
Labour gain from Conservative		Swing		

=== Oxford ===
Oxford
Party	Candidate	Votes	%	±%
Liberal	H. Elverston	498	71.7	N/A
Independent	J. Pitt Hardacre*	197	28.3	N/A
Majority		301	43.4	N/A
Turnout		695		
Liberal gain from Independent		Swing		

=== Rusholme ===
Rusholme
Party	Candidate	Votes	%	±%
Liberal	H. Plummer*	uncontested		
Liberal hold		Swing		

=== St. Ann's ===
St. Ann's
Party	Candidate	Votes	%	±%
Conservative	J. Fildes*	uncontested		
Conservative hold		Swing		

=== St. Clement's ===
St. Clement's
Party	Candidate	Votes	%	±%
Conservative	T. Hassall*	uncontested		
Conservative hold		Swing		

=== St. George's ===
St. George's
Party	Candidate	Votes	%	±%
Conservative	W. Kay*	1,804	58.4	+6.9
Liberal	T. Corrigan	837	27.1	−21.4
Labour	R. Whitehead	449	14.5	N/A
Majority		967	31.3	+28.3
Turnout		3,090		
Conservative hold		Swing		

=== St. James' ===
St. James'
Party	Candidate	Votes	%	±%
Liberal	H. J. Goldschmidt*	uncontested		
Liberal hold		Swing		

=== St. John's ===
St. John's
Party	Candidate	Votes	%	±%
Conservative	H. Shuttleworth	474	50.9	N/A
Liberal	R. Flanagan	431	46.3	N/A
Labour	T. Bolger	26	2.8	N/A
Majority		43	4.6	N/A
Turnout		931		
Conservative gain from Liberal		Swing		

=== St. Luke's ===
St. Luke's
Party	Candidate	Votes	%	±%
Liberal	J. H. Thewlis*	uncontested		
Liberal hold		Swing		

=== St. Mark's ===
St. Mark's
Party	Candidate	Votes	%	±%
Conservative	W. H. Beastow*	uncontested		
Conservative hold		Swing		

=== St. Michael's ===
St. Michael's
Party	Candidate	Votes	%	±%
Conservative	A. Hibbert*	1,517	52.6	+7.2
Irish Nationalist	F. J. Farley	1,369	47.4	N/A
Majority		148	5.2	
Turnout		2,886		
Conservative hold		Swing		

=== Withington ===
Withington (3 vacancies)
Party	Candidate	Votes	%	±%
Conservative	S. Edwards	618	67.5	
Conservative	H. Derwent Simpson	517	56.5	
Liberal	R. Fleeson	489	53.4	
Independent	R. R. Shaw	336	36.7	
Independent	A. Burgess	220	24.0	
Majority		153	16.7	
Turnout		915		
Conservative win (new seat)				
Conservative win (new seat)				
Liberal win (new seat)				

== Aldermanic elections ==
=== Aldermanic elections, 9 November 1904 ===
At the meeting of the council on 9 November 1904, the terms of office of thirteen aldermen expired.

The following thirteen were elected as aldermen by the council on 9 November 1904 for a term of six years.

Party	Alderman	Ward	Term expires
Liberal	William Birkbeck*	New Cross	1910
Liberal	James Bowes*	Miles Platting	1910
Conservative	Arthur Copeland*	St. James'	1910
Liberal	Alfred Evans*		1910
Conservative	William Griffin*	Harpurhey	1910
Liberal	Sir John James Harwood*	Cheetham	1910
Liberal	Sir James Hoy*		1910
Liberal	John Milling*		1910
Liberal	James Rushworth*		1910
Liberal	Walton Smith*		1910
Conservative	James Tunstall*		1910
Conservative	Sir William H. Vaudrey*	Exchange	1910
Liberal	J. H. Wells*		1910

Caused by the creation of Chorlton-cum-Hardy, Didsbury, Moss Side East, Moss Side West, and Withington wards on 1 November 1904, requiring the election of five aldermen by the council.

The following five were elected as aldermen by the council on 9 November 1904.

Party	Alderman	Ward	Term expires
Conservative	Henry Richard Box	Moss Side East	1910
Liberal	John Frowde	Moss Side West	1907
Conservative	Walter Harwood	Didsbury	1910
Liberal	William Norquoy	Withington	1907
Liberal	Thomas Turnbull	Chorlton-cum-Hardy	1907

=== Aldermanic election, 1 February 1905 ===
Caused by the death on 22 January 1905 of Alderman William Griffin (Conservative, elected as an alderman by the council on 9 November 1885).

In his place, Councillor William Trevor (Liberal, Newton Heath, elected 1 November 1890) was elected as an alderman by the council on 1 February 1905.

Party	Alderman	Ward	Term expires
Liberal	William Trevor		1910

=== Aldermanic election, 17 May 1905 ===
Caused by the death on 25 April 1905 of Alderman John King (Liberal Unionist, elected as an alderman by the council on 11 December 1867).

In his place, Councillor W. H. Wainwright (Liberal, St. Mark's, elected 1 November 1890) was elected as an alderman by the council on 17 May 1905.

Party	Alderman	Ward	Term expires
Liberal	W. H. Wainwright	Exchange	1907

=== Aldermanic election, 5 July 1905 ===
Caused by the death on 20 June 1905 of Alderman John Milling (Liberal, elected as an alderman by the council on 4 June 1890).

In his place, Councillor Edward Holt (Conservative, Crumpsall, elected 1 November 1890) was elected as an alderman by the council on 5 July 1905.

Party	Alderman	Ward	Term expires
Conservative	Edward Holt		1910

=== Aldermanic elections, 25 October 1905 ===
Caused by the resignation on 2 October 1905 of Alderman Sir John James Harwood (Liberal, elected as an alderman by the council on 21 February 1881).

In his place, Councillor John Robert Wilson (Conservative, Longsight, elected 30 November 1890) was elected as an alderman by the council on 25 October 1905.

Party	Alderman	Ward	Term expires
Conservative	John Robert Wilson		1910

Caused by the death on 10 October 1905 of Alderman Richard Lovatt Reade (Conservative, elected as an alderman by the council on 19 March 1889).

In his place, Councillor W. T. Rothwell (Conservative, Newton Heath, elected 30 November 1890) was elected as an alderman by the council on 25 October 1905.

Party	Alderman	Ward	Term expires
Conservative	W. T. Rothwell		1907

== By-elections between 1904 and 1905 ==
=== Newton Heath, 14 February 1905 ===
Caused by the election as an alderman of Councillor William Trevor (Liberal, Newton Heath, elected 1 November 1890) on 1 February 1905 following the death on 22 January 1905 of Alderman William Griffin (Conservative, elected as an alderman by the council on 9 November 1885).

Newton Heath
Party	Candidate	Votes	%	±%
Conservative	F. J. West	1,130	43.4	N/A
Labour	J. J. Rudge	902	34.7	N/A
Liberal	F. T. T. Reynolds	570	21.9	N/A
Majority		228	8.7	N/A
Turnout		2,602		
Conservative gain from Liberal		Swing		

=== St. Mark's, 30 May 1905 ===
Caused by the election as an alderman of Councillor W. H. Wainwright (Liberal, St. Mark's, elected 1 November 1890) on 17 May 1905 following the death on 25 April 1905 of Alderman John King (Liberal Unionist, elected as an alderman by the council on 11 December 1867).

St. Mark's
Party	Candidate	Votes	%	±%
Independent Liberal	R. Turner	778	48.0	N/A
Liberal	G. Jennison	315	19.4	N/A
Labour	L. Martin	278	17.2	N/A
Independent Labour	H. C. Campbell	249	15.4	N/A
Majority		463	28.6	N/A
Turnout		1,620		
Independent Liberal gain from Liberal		Swing		

=== Crumpsall, 21 July 1905 ===
Caused by the election as an alderman of Councillor Edward Holt (Conservative, Crumpsall, elected 1 November 1890) on 5 July 1905 following the death on 20 June 1905 of Alderman John Milling (Liberal, elected as an alderman by the council on 4 June 1890).

Crumpsall
Party	Candidate	Votes	%	±%
Conservative	F. Todd	uncontested		
Conservative hold		Swing		
