= 1983 Manchester City Council election =

1983 UK local government election

- 5 May 1983

33 of 99 seats to Manchester City Council 50 seats needed for a majority
	First party	Second party	Third party
Leader	Bill Egerton	Cecil Franks	Audrey Jones
Party	Labour	Conservative	Alliance
Leader's seat	Beswick and Clayton	Chorlton	Withington
Last election	69 seats, 44.9%	26 seats, 31.2%	4 seats, 23.3%
Seats before	69	26	4
Seats won	27	4	2
Seats after	72	22	5
Seat change	▲3	▼4	▲1
Popular vote	74,319	44,788	24,650
Percentage	51.6%	31.1%	17.1%
Swing	▲5.7%	▼0.6%	▼5.2%
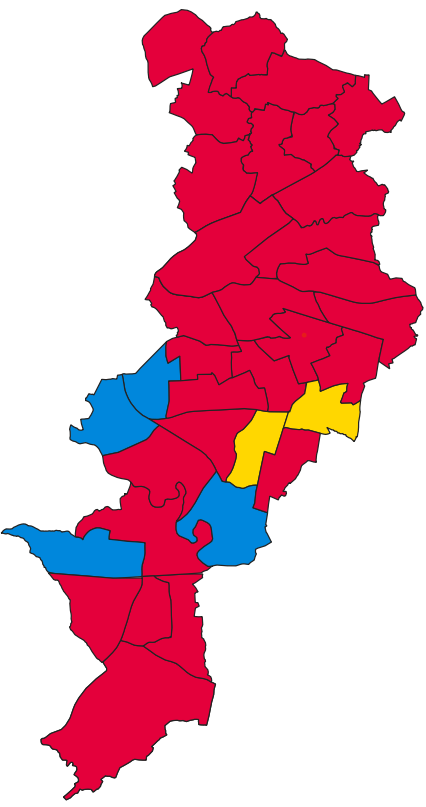
- Map of results of 1983 election
Leader of the Council before election
Bill Egerton
Labour
Leader of the Council after election
Bill Egerton
Labour

Elections to Manchester City Council were held on Thursday, 5 May 1983. One-third of the council was up for election, with each successful candidate to serve a four-year term of office, expiring in 1987. The Labour Party retained overall control of the council.

== Election result ==
Party	Votes		Seats			Full Council	
Labour Party	74,319 (51.6%)	▲5.7	27 (81.8%)	27 / 33	▲3	72 (72.7%)	72 / 99
Conservative Party	44,788 (31.1%)	▼0.6	4 (12.1%)	4 / 33	▼4	22 (22.2%)	22 / 99
Alliance	24,650 (17.1%)	▼5.2	2 (6.1%)	2 / 33	▲1	5 (5.1%)	5 / 99
National Front	128 (0.1%)	▲0.1	0 (0.0%)	0 / 33	Steady	0 (0.0%)	0 / 99
Communist	108 (0.1%)	N/A	0 (0.0%)	0 / 33	N/A	0 (0.0%)	0 / 99
Independent	54 (0.0%)	▼0.3	0 (0.0%)	0 / 33	Steady	0 (0.0%)	0 / 99

↓
72	5	22

== Ward results ==
=== Ardwick ===
Ardwick
Party	Candidate	Votes	%	±%
Labour	Norman Finley*	2,447	75.6	+3.4
Conservative	Stephen Lundy	503	15.5	−0.2
Liberal	Lauriston Ford	285	8.8	−3.2
Majority		1,944	60.1	+3.6
Turnout		3,235		
Labour hold		Swing	+1.8	

=== Baguley ===
Baguley
Party	Candidate	Votes	%	±%
Labour	Winifred Smith*	2,826	62.3	+7.3
Conservative	Christopher Ennis	1,290	28.4	+3.9
Liberal	Georgina Hall	419	9.2	−11.3
Majority		1,536	33.9	+3.4
Turnout		4,535		
Labour hold		Swing	+1.7	

=== Barlow Moor ===
Barlow Moor
Party	Candidate	Votes	%	±%
Labour	Christopher Tucker*	2,034	45.6	+8.5
Conservative	Beryl Moore	1,702	38.2	+0.5
SDP	Simon Gluck	720	16.2	−9.0
Majority		332	7.5	+6.8
Turnout		4,456		
Labour hold		Swing	+4.0	

=== Benchill ===
Benchill
Party	Candidate	Votes	%	±%
Labour	Neil Warren*	2,579	72.1	+9.7
Conservative	Mirjam Malbon	554	15.5	+2.0
Liberal	Gilbert Stacey	443	12.4	−11.8
Majority		2,025	56.6	+7.6
Turnout		3,576		
Labour hold		Swing	+3.8	

=== Beswick and Clayton ===
Beswick and Clayton
Party	Candidate	Votes	%	±%
Labour	Sidney Silverman*	2,498	68.9	+1.1
Conservative	Leonard Hockey	797	22.0	−0.2
SDP	Angus Bateman	244	6.7	−3.2
National Front	Alfred Coles	84	2.3	+2.3
Majority		1,701	47.0	+1.3
Turnout		3,623		
Labour hold		Swing	+0.6	

=== Blackley ===
Blackley
Party	Candidate	Votes	%	±%
Labour	Eileen Kelly*	2,682	62.0	+3.3
Conservative	Gerry Carey	1,238	28.6	+0.7
Liberal	David Gordon	408	9.4	−4.0
Majority		1,444	33.4	+2.6
Turnout		4,328		
Labour hold		Swing	+1.3	

=== Bradford ===
Bradford
Party	Candidate	Votes	%	±%
Labour	Michael Harrison*	2,499	72.8	+4.0
Conservative	Clive Webb	615	17.9	−0.3
Liberal	Norman Towers	321	9.3	−3.7
Majority		1,884	54.8	+4.2
Turnout		3,435		
Labour hold		Swing	+2.1	

=== Brooklands ===
Brooklands
Party	Candidate	Votes	%	±%
Conservative	David Sumberg*	2,249	45.5	+0.1
Labour	Paul Clarke	2,093	42.4	+7.8
SDP	Jeffrey Burton	598	12.1	−7.9
Majority		156	3.2	−7.7
Turnout		4,940		
Conservative hold		Swing	-3.8	

=== Burnage ===
Burnage
Party	Candidate	Votes	%	±%
Labour	Marilyn Taylor	2,294	44.1	+7.7
Conservative	Ronald Nicholson*	2,121	40.8	+0.6
SDP	Kenneth McKeon	783	15.1	−8.3
Majority		173	3.3	−0.4
Turnout		5,198		
Labour gain from Conservative		Swing	+3.5	

=== Central ===
Central
Party	Candidate	Votes	%	±%
Labour	Patricia Conquest*	2,172	76.7	+8.3
Conservative	Phyllis Pacey	352	12.4	+0.7
SDP	Teresa Lyons	306	10.8	−9.0
Majority		1,820	64.3	+15.7
Turnout		2,830		
Labour hold		Swing	+3.8	

=== Charlestown ===
Charlestown
Party	Candidate	Votes	%	±%
Labour	Alan Wood*	2,362	52.5	+4.9
Conservative	Richard Smith	1,407	31.3	+0.6
SDP	John Czernenko	728	16.2	−5.5
Majority		955	21.2	+4.2
Turnout		4,497		
Labour hold		Swing	+2.1	

=== Cheetham ===
Cheetham
Party	Candidate	Votes	%	±%
Labour	Nick Harris*	2,560	66.7	+5.4
SDP	Muhammad Qureshi	726	18.9	−4.4
Conservative	Veronica Jones	551	14.4	−1.0
Majority		1,834	47.8	+9.9
Turnout		3,837		
Labour hold		Swing	+4.9	

=== Chorlton ===
Chorlton
Party	Candidate	Votes	%	±%
Conservative	Cecil Franks*	2,547	46.8	+3.0
Labour	Graham Martin	1,986	36.5	+6.4
Liberal	John Commons	876	16.1	−10.1
Communist	Michael Waterfield	36	0.7	+0.7
Majority		561	10.3	−3.4
Turnout		5,445		
Conservative hold		Swing	-1.7	

=== Crumpsall ===
Crumpsall
Party	Candidate	Votes	%	±%
Labour	Basil Curley	1,887	44.3	+11.9
Conservative	George Fildes*	1,836	43.1	−0.9
SDP	Gerald Landsman	541	12.7	−11.0
Majority		51	1.2	−10.4
Turnout		4,264		
Labour gain from Conservative		Swing	+6.4	

=== Didsbury ===
Didsbury
Party	Candidate	Votes	%	±%
Conservative	Muriel Crawford*	2,877	52.3	+2.1
SDP	John Whitman	1,467	26.7	−6.3
Labour	Gerrard Carroll	1,153	21.0	+4.2
Majority		1,410	25.7	+8.4
Turnout		5,497		
Conservative hold		Swing	+4.2	

=== Fallowfield ===
Fallowfield
Party	Candidate	Votes	%	±%
Labour	Philip Openshaw*	1,993	48.1	+7.5
Conservative	John Hardman	1,587	38.3	+4.5
SDP	George Nevins	560	13.5	−12.0
Majority		406	9.8	+3.0
Turnout		4,140		
Labour hold		Swing	+1.5	

=== Gorton North ===
Gorton North
Party	Candidate	Votes	%	±%
Labour	John Wilson	2,695	54.6	+2.7
Conservative	Christopher McGregor	1,278	25.9	+4.3
SDP	Zygmunt Gazdecki	964	19.5	−7.0
Majority		1,417	28.7	+3.4
Turnout		4,937		
Labour hold		Swing	-0.8	

=== Gorton South ===
Gorton South
Party	Candidate	Votes	%	±%
Labour	Valerie Stevens*	2,247	52.3	+3.3
Liberal	Dorothy Bell	1,282	29.9	+5.6
Conservative	Peter Dunne	765	17.8	−7.1
Majority		965	22.5	−1.6
Turnout		4,294		
Labour hold		Swing	-1.1	

=== Harpurhey ===
Harpurhey
Party	Candidate	Votes	%	±%
Labour	Nilofar Siddiqi*	2,086	58.5	+2.8
Conservative	Denise Jackson	883	24.8	−1.3
SDP	Edward Charnley	596	16.7	−1.4
Majority		1,203	33.7	+4.1
Turnout		3,565		
Labour hold		Swing	+2.0	

=== Hulme ===
Hulme
Party	Candidate	Votes	%	±%
Labour	Sheila Robertson*	2,535	75.3	+12.2
Conservative	Clive Freemantle	432	12.8	+0.2
Liberal	David Nicholson	401	11.9	−12.4
Majority		2,103	62.4	+23.6
Turnout		3,368		
Labour hold		Swing	+6.0	

=== Levenshulme ===
Levenshulme
Party	Candidate	Votes	%	±%
Liberal	Audrey Greaves	1,913	37.8	−4.4
Labour	John Rimington	1,583	31.3	+6.3
Conservative	John Monks	1,564	30.9	−1.8
Majority		330	6.5	−3.0
Turnout		5,060		
Liberal hold		Swing	-5.3	

=== Lightbowne ===
Lightbowne
Party	Candidate	Votes	%	±%
Labour	Derek Shaw*	2,543	53.3	+8.7
Conservative	Albert Bolland	1,678	35.2	+7.3
Liberal	John Cookson	551	11.5	−13.0
Majority		865	18.1	+1.4
Turnout		4,772		
Labour hold		Swing	+0.7	

=== Longsight ===
Longsight
Party	Candidate	Votes	%	±%
Labour	Kenneth Strath*	2,665	55.5	+10.9
SDP	Altaf Ahmed	1,163	24.2	−8.9
Conservative	George Taylor	903	18.8	+1.2
Communist	Geoffrey Chandler	72	1.5	+1.5
Majority		1,502	31.3	+19.8
Turnout		4,803		
Labour hold		Swing	+9.9	

=== Moss Side ===
Moss Side
Party	Candidate	Votes	%	±%
Labour	Sam Darby	2,770	72.3	+9.8
Conservative	Grant Higginson	698	18.2	−5.4
Liberal	Sarah Barber	362	9.5	−1.5
Majority		2,072	54.1	+15.2
Turnout		3,830		
Labour hold		Swing	+7.6	

=== Moston ===
Moston
Party	Candidate	Votes	%	±%
Labour	William Risby*	2,621	49.6	+6.5
Conservative	Dave Eager	2,061	39.0	−0.8
Liberal	Martin Gradwell	599	11.3	−5.7
Majority		560	10.6	+7.4
Turnout		5,281		
Labour hold		Swing	+3.6	

=== Newton Heath ===
Newton Heath
Party	Candidate	Votes	%	±%
Labour	Michael Taylor*	2,480	67.2	+4.4
Conservative	Stephen Johnson	880	23.8	−0.7
Liberal	Vera Towers	286	7.8	−4.9
National Front	Bryan Nylan	44	1.2	+1.2
Majority		1,600	43.4	+5.1
Turnout		3,690		
Labour hold		Swing	+2.5	

=== Northenden ===
Northenden
Party	Candidate	Votes	%	±%
Labour	Duncan Healey*	2,433	44.4	+4.3
Conservative	George Leigh	2,290	41.8	+3.5
SDP	Lawrence Shields	754	13.8	−4.9
Majority		143	2.6	+0.8
Turnout		5,477		
Labour hold		Swing	+0.4	

=== Old Moat ===
Old Moat
Party	Candidate	Votes	%	±%
Labour	Keith Bradley	2,359	48.3	+14.7
Conservative	Peter Hilton*	1,795	36.8	−5.0
Liberal	Richard Clayton	729	14.9	−9.7
Majority		564	11.6	+3.3
Turnout		4,883		
Labour gain from Conservative		Swing	+9.8	

=== Rusholme ===
Rusholme
Party	Candidate	Votes	%	±%
Labour	Margaret Roff*	2,102	46.9	+2.7
Conservative	Shakir Hussain	1,242	27.7	−6.3
Liberal	Guy Goodman	1,081	24.1	+2.4
Independent	Frederick Melling	54	1.2	+1.2
Majority		860	19.2	+9.0
Turnout		4,479		
Labour hold		Swing	+4.5	

=== Sharston ===
Sharston
Party	Candidate	Votes	%	±%
Labour	William Jameson*	2,080	46.4	+2.8
Conservative	Annie Spencer	1,398	31.2	+0.8
Liberal	Herbert Griffiths	979	21.9	−3.7
Majority		682	15.2	+2.0
Turnout		4,479		
Labour hold		Swing	+1.0	

=== Whalley Range ===
Whalley Range
Party	Candidate	Votes	%	±%
Conservative	Michael Whetton*	2,063	45.9	+1.5
Labour	Roy Walters	1,705	38.0	+7.9
SDP	Mary James	723	16.1	−9.5
Majority		358	8.0	−6.4
Turnout		4,491		
Conservative hold		Swing	-3.2	

=== Withington ===
Withington
Party	Candidate	Votes	%	±%
Liberal	David Sandiford	2,147	42.0	+1.4
Conservative	Margaret Davies*	1,854	36.3	−3.1
Labour	Raymond Write	1,111	21.7	+1.7
Majority		293	5.7	+4.5
Turnout		5,112		
Liberal gain from Conservative		Swing	+2.2	

=== Woodhouse Park ===
Woodhouse Park
Party	Candidate	Votes	%	±%
Labour	Frank Booth	2,239	60.3	−3.6
Conservative	Gladys Parry	778	21.0	+3.6
SDP	Eileen Wildman	695	18.7	−0.0
Majority		1,461	39.4	−5.8
Turnout		3,712		
Labour hold		Swing	-3.6	
