= Didsbury (ward) =

- Ward
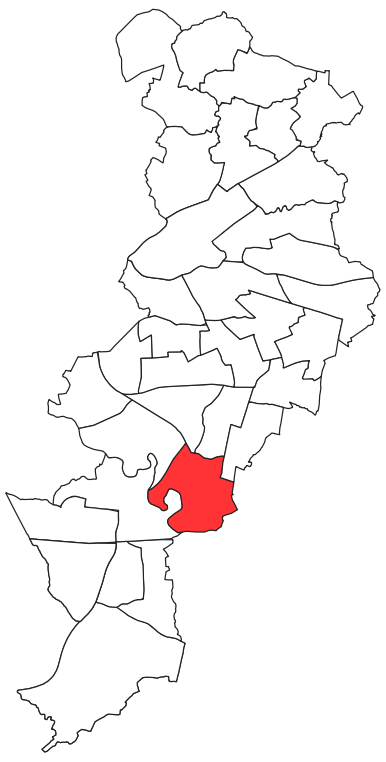
- Didsbury ward (1994) within Manchester

- Coat of arms
- Country: United Kingdom
- Constituent country: England
- Region: North West England
- County: Greater Manchester
- Metropolitan borough: Manchester
- Created: November 1904
- Named for: Didsbury

Government
  - Type: Unicameral
  - Body: Manchester City Council
- UK Parliamentary Constituency: Manchester Withington

Didsbury was an electoral division of Manchester City Council which was represented from 1904 until 2004. It covered the South Manchester suburb of Didsbury.

== Overview ==
Didsbury ward was created in 1904, as a result of the Manchester Extension Scheme 1904, which transferred the urban districts of Moss Side and Withington to the Manchester corporation. Initially, the ward's boundaries corresponded with those of the Didsbury and West Didsbury wards of the former Withington Urban District, these boundaries were not affected by a city-wide boundary revision in 1919. In 1950, that part of the ward to the west of Palatine Road was transferred to the new Barlow Moor ward, these boundaries were left unchanged by another city-wide boundary revision in 1971. In 1982, a small portion of the north of the ward was transferred to the Burnage ward. In 2004, the ward was abolished, and its remaining area was divided between the new Didsbury East and Didsbury West wards.

From its creation until 1918, the ward formed part of the Stretford Parliamentary constituency. From 1918 until 1950, it was part of the Manchester Withington Parliamentary constituency. From 1950 until 1974, it was part of the Manchester Wythenshawe Parliamentary constituency. From 1974 until its abolition, it was part of the Manchester Withington Parliamentary Constituency.

== Councillors ==
Election	Councillor	Councillor	Councillor
1904	F. Moss (Ind)	C. K. Mayor (Con)	C. S. Edwards (Ind)
1905	F. Moss (Ind)	C. K. Mayor (Con)	C. J. H. Gradisky (Lib)
1906	F. Moss (Ind)	C. K. Mayor (Con)	C. J. H. Gradisky (Lib)
1907	F. Moss (Ind)	C. K. Mayor (Con)	C. J. H. Gradisky (Lib)
1908	F. Moss (Ind)	C. K. Mayor (Con)	J. Swarbrick (Lib)
1909	F. Moss (Ind)	W. Booth (Con)	J. Swarbrick (Lib)
December 1909	J. W. Cook (Lib)	W. Booth (Con)	J. Swarbrick (Lib)
1910	J. W. Cook (Lib)	W. Booth (Con)	J. Swarbrick (Lib)
1911	J. W. Cook (Lib)	W. Booth (Con)	J. Swarbrick (Lib)
1912	J. W. Cook (Lib)	E. D. Simon (Lib)	J. Swarbrick (Lib)
1913	H. H. Bowden (Con)	E. D. Simon (Lib)	J. Swarbrick (Lib)
1914	H. H. Bowden (Con)	E. D. Simon (Lib)	J. Swarbrick (Lib)
1919	H. H. Bowden (Con)	E. D. Simon (Lib)	J. Swarbrick (Lib)
1920	G. H. White (Con)	E. D. Simon (Lib)	J. Swarbrick (Lib)
1921	G. H. White (Con)	E. D. Simon (Lib)	J. Swarbrick (Lib)
1922	G. H. White (Con)	E. D. Simon (Lib)	J. Swarbrick (Lib)
1923	G. H. White (Con)	E. D. Simon (Lib)	J. Swarbrick (Lib)
1924	G. H. White (Con)	E. D. Simon (Lib)	J. Swarbrick (Lib)
1925	G. H. White (Con)	H. Levinstein (Con)	J. Swarbrick (Lib)
1926	G. H. White (Con)	H. Levinstein (Con)	J. Swarbrick (Lib)
May 1927	G. H. White (Con)	H. Levinstein (Con)	J. E. Heald (Con)
1927	G. H. White (Con)	H. Levinstein (Con)	J. E. Heald (Con)
1928	G. H. White (Con)	S. P. Dawson (Con)	J. E. Heald (Con)
1929	G. H. White (Con)	S. P. Dawson (Con)	J. E. Heald (Con)
1930	G. H. White (Con)	S. P. Dawson (Con)	N. Westcott (Con)
1931	G. H. White (Con)	S. P. Dawson (Con)	N. Westcott (Con)
1932	G. H. White (Con)	S. P. Dawson (Con)	N. Westcott (Con)
1933	G. H. White (Con)	S. P. Dawson (Con)	N. Westcott (Con)
1934	G. H. White (Con)	S. P. Dawson (Con)	N. Westcott (Con)
1935	G. H. White (Con)	S. P. Dawson (Con)	N. Westcott (Con)
1936	G. H. White (Con)	S. P. Dawson (Con)	E. Hill (Con)
October 1937	W. White (Con)	S. P. Dawson (Con)	E. Hill (Con)
1937	W. White (Con)	S. P. Dawson (Con)	E. Hill (Con)
1938	W. White (Con)	S. P. Dawson (Con)	E. Hill (Con)
1945	W. White (Con)	S. P. Dawson (Con)	E. Hill (Con)
1946	W. White (Con)	S. P. Dawson (Con)	E. Hill (Con)
1947	W. White (Con)	S. P. Dawson (Con)	E. Hill (Con)
June 1948	W. White (Con)	G. C. Hilditch (Con)	E. Hill (Con)
1949	W. White (Con)	G. C. Hilditch (Con)	E. Hill (Con)
1950	W. White (Con)	G. C. Hilditch (Con)	E. Hill (Con)
1951	W. White (Con)	G. C. Hilditch (Con)	E. Hill (Con)
1952	W. White (Con)	G. C. Hilditch (Con)	E. Hill (Con)
1953	W. White (Con)	D. K. Lee (Con)	E. Hill (Con)
1954	W. White (Con)	D. K. Lee (Con)	E. Hill (Con)
1955	W. White (Con)	D. K. Lee (Con)	E. Hill (Con)
1956	W. White (Con)	D. K. Lee (Con)	E. Hill (Con)
1957	W. White (Con)	D. K. Lee (Con)	E. Hill (Con)
October 1957	W. White (Con)	D. K. Lee (Con)	M. MacInerney (Lib)
1958	W. White (Con)	D. K. Lee (Con)	M. R. Crawford (Con)
1959	W. White (Con)	D. K. Lee (Con)	M. R. Crawford (Con)
1960	W. White (Con)	D. K. Lee (Con)	M. R. Crawford (Con)
1961	W. White (Con)	D. K. Lee (Con)	M. R. Crawford (Con)
July 1961	N. Coe (Con)	D. K. Lee (Con)	M. R. Crawford (Con)
1962	N. Coe (Con)	D. K. Lee (Con)	M. R. Crawford (Con)
1963	N. Coe (Con)	D. K. Lee (Con)	M. R. Crawford (Con)
1964	N. Coe (Con)	D. K. Lee (Con)	M. R. Crawford (Con)
1965	N. Coe (Con)	D. K. Lee (Con)	M. R. Crawford (Con)
1966	N. Coe (Con)	D. K. Lee (Con)	M. R. Crawford (Con)
1967	N. Coe (Con)	D. K. Lee (Con)	M. R. Crawford (Con)
1968	N. Coe (Con)	D. K. Lee (Con)	M. R. Crawford (Con)
October 1968	N. Coe (Con)	J. Hill (Con)	M. R. Crawford (Con)
1969	J. Duke (Con)	J. Hill (Con)	M. R. Crawford (Con)
1970	J. Duke (Con)	J. Hill (Con)	M. R. Crawford (Con)
1971	M. R. Crawford (Con)	J. Hill (Con)	J. Duke (Con)
1972	M. R. Crawford (Con)	J. Hill (Con)	J. Duke (Con)
1973	J. Hill (Con)	J. Duke (Con)	M. R. Crawford (Con)
1975	J. Hill (Con)	J. Duke (Con)	M. R. Crawford (Con)
1976	J. Hill (Con)	J. Duke (Con)	M. R. Crawford (Con)
1978	J. Hill (Con)	J. Duke (Con)	M. R. Crawford (Con)
1979	J. Hill (Con)	J. Duke (Con)	M. R. Crawford (Con)
1980	J. Hill (Con)	J. Duke (Con)	M. R. Crawford (Con)
1982	J. Hill (Con)	J. Duke (Con)	M. R. Crawford (Con)
1983	J. Hill (Con)	J. Duke (Con)	M. R. Crawford (Con)
1984	J. Hill (Con)	J. Duke (Con)	M. R. Crawford (Con)
1986	J. Hill (Con)	J. Duke (Con)	M. R. Crawford (Con)
1987	J. Hill (Con)	J. Duke (Con)	M. R. Crawford (Con)
1988	J. Hill (Con)	P. Hilton (Con)	M. R. Crawford (Con)
1990	J. Hill (Con)	P. Hilton (Con)	M. R. Crawford (Con)
1991	J. Hill (Con)	P. Hilton (Con)	W. H. Aikman (Con)
1992	J. Hill (Con)	P. Hilton (Con)	W. H. Aikman (Con)
1994	G. Bridson (Lab)	P. Hilton (Con)	W. H. Aikman (Con)
1995	G. Bridson (Lab)	P. Hilton (Con)	R. Masztalerz (Lab)
1996	G. Bridson (Lab)	P. Smythe (Lab)	R. Masztalerz (Lab)
1998	G. Bridson (Lab)	P. Smythe (Lab)	R. Masztalerz (Lab)
1999	G. Bridson (Lab)	P. Smythe (Lab)	D. Sandiford (Lib Dem)
2000	G. Bridson (Lab)	T. Parkinson (Lib Dem)	D. Sandiford (Lib Dem)
2002	H. Fisher (Lib Dem)	T. Parkinson (Lib Dem)	D. Sandiford (Lib Dem)
2003	H. Fisher (Lib Dem)	T. Parkinson (Lib Dem)	D. Sandiford (Lib Dem)

== Elections ==
=== Elections in 1900s ===
==== November 1904 ====
1904 (3 vacancies)
Party	Candidate	Votes	%	±%
Independent	F. Moss	596	51.0	
Conservative	C. K. Mayor	595	50.9	
Independent	C. S. Edwards	566	48.5	
Independent	C. J. H. Gradisky	557	47.7	
Majority		9	0.8	
Turnout		1,168		
Independent win (new seat)				
Conservative win (new seat)				
Independent win (new seat)				

==== November 1905 ====
1905
Party	Candidate	Votes	%	±%
Liberal	C. J. H. Gradisky	600	54.3	N/A
Independent	C. S. Edwards*	504	45.7	−2.8
Majority		96	8.6	
Turnout		1,104		
Liberal gain from Independent		Swing		

==== November 1906 ====
1906
Party	Candidate	Votes	%	±%
Conservative	C. K. Mayor*	uncontested		
Conservative hold		Swing		

==== November 1907 ====
1907
Party	Candidate	Votes	%	±%
Independent	F. Moss*	uncontested		
Independent hold		Swing		

==== November 1908 ====
1908
Party	Candidate	Votes	%	±%
Liberal	J. Swarbrick	715	54.4	N/A
Conservative	C. S. Edwards	599	45.6	N/A
Majority		116	8.8	N/A
Turnout		1,314		
Liberal hold		Swing		

==== November 1909 ====
1909
Party	Candidate	Votes	%	±%
Conservative	W. Booth	729	58.3	+12.7
Independent	J. Redford	522	41.7	N/A
Majority		207	16.6	
Turnout		1,251		
Conservative hold		Swing		

==== December 1909 (by-election) ====
By-election: 15 December 1909
Party	Candidate	Votes	%	±%
Liberal	J. W. Cook	722	56.7	N/A
Conservative	C. F. Poyser	551	43.3	−15.0
Majority		171	13.4	
Turnout		1,273		
Liberal gain from Independent		Swing		

=== Elections in 1910s ===
==== November 1910 ====
1910
Party	Candidate	Votes	%	±%
Liberal	J. W. Cook*	uncontested		
Liberal hold		Swing		

==== November 1911 ====
1911
Party	Candidate	Votes	%	±%
Liberal	J. Swarbrick*	786	54.9	N/A
Conservative	P. Potter	645	45.1	N/A
Majority		141	9.8	N/A
Turnout		1,431		
Liberal hold		Swing		

==== November 1912 ====
1912
Party	Candidate	Votes	%	±%
Liberal	E. D. Simon	uncontested		
Liberal gain from Conservative		Swing		

==== November 1913 ====
1913
Party	Candidate	Votes	%	±%
Conservative	H. H. Bowden	839	51.3	N/A
Liberal	J. W. Cook*	795	48.7	N/A
Majority		44	2.6	N/A
Turnout		1,634		
Conservative gain from Liberal		Swing		

==== November 1914 ====
1914
Party	Candidate	Votes	%	±%
Liberal	J. Swarbrick*	uncontested		
Liberal hold		Swing		

==== November 1919 ====
1919 (new boundaries)
Party	Candidate	Votes	%	±%
Liberal	E. D. Simon*	uncontested		
Liberal hold		Swing		

=== Elections in 1920s ===
==== November 1920 ====
1920
Party	Candidate	Votes	%	±%
Conservative	G. H. White	2,457	80.7	N/A
Co-operative Party	G. Clegg-Claber	586	19.3	N/A
Majority		1,871	61.5	
Turnout		3,043	54.3	N.A
Conservative hold		Swing		

==== November 1921 ====
1921
Party	Candidate	Votes	%	±%
Liberal	J. Swarbrick*	1,620	51.2	N/A
Conservative	F. Stapleton	1,546	48.8	−31.9
Majority		74	2.4	
Turnout		3,166	59.0	+4.7
Liberal hold		Swing		

==== November 1922 ====
1922
Party	Candidate	Votes	%	±%
Liberal	E. D. Simon*	uncontested		
Liberal hold		Swing		

==== November 1923 ====
1923
Party	Candidate	Votes	%	±%
Conservative	G. H. White*	2,104	59.8	N/A
Liberal	J. W. Hampson	1,416	40.2	N/A
Majority		688	19.6	N/A
Turnout		3,520		
Conservative hold		Swing		

==== November 1924 ====
1924
Party	Candidate	Votes	%	±%
Liberal	J. Swarbrick*	2,333	62.9	+22.7
Conservative	F. Stapleton	1,375	37.1	−22.7
Majority		958	25.8	
Turnout		3,708		
Liberal hold		Swing		

==== November 1925 ====
1925
Party	Candidate	Votes	%	±%
Conservative	H. Levinstein	2,360	59.5	+22.4
Liberal	J. W. Hampson	1,605	40.5	−22.4
Majority		755	19.0	
Turnout		3,965	63.6	
Conservative gain from Liberal		Swing		

==== November 1926 ====
1926
Party	Candidate	Votes	%	±%
Conservative	G. H. White*	1,968	53.3	−6.2
Liberal	A. F. Mason	1,727	46.7	+6.2
Majority		241	6.6	−12.4
Turnout		3,695	57.1	−6.5
Conservative hold		Swing		

==== May 1927 (by-election) ====
By-election: 17 May 1927
Party	Candidate	Votes	%	±%
Conservative	J. E. Heald	1,755	55.0	+1.7
Liberal	T. Molloy	1,079	33.8	−12.9
Labour	A. McIlwrick	355	11.1	N/A
Majority		676	21.2	+14.6
Turnout		3,189	48.6	−8.5
Conservative gain from Liberal		Swing		

==== November 1927 ====
1927
Party	Candidate	Votes	%	±%
Conservative	J. E. Heald*	1,877	51.1	−2.2
Liberal	H. Entwistle	1,793	48.9	+2.2
Majority		84	2.2	−4.4
Turnout		3,670	54.4	−2.7
Conservative hold		Swing		

==== November 1928 ====
1928
Party	Candidate	Votes	%	±%
Conservative	S. P. Dawson	2,060	51.0	−0.1
Liberal	D. Porter	1,979	49.0	+0.1
Majority		81	2.0	−0.2
Turnout		4,039	56.8	+2.4
Conservative hold		Swing		

==== November 1929 ====
1929
Party	Candidate	Votes	%	±%
Conservative	G. H. White*	2,071	50.6	−0.4
Liberal	D. Porter	2,019	49.4	+0.4
Majority		52	1.2	−0.8
Turnout		4,090	50.8	−6.0
Conservative hold		Swing		

=== Elections in 1930s ===
==== November 1930 ====
1930
Party	Candidate	Votes	%	±%
Conservative	N. Westcott	2,793	54.8	+4.2
Liberal	D. Porter	2,306	45.2	−4.2
Majority		485	9.6	+8.4
Turnout		5,099		
Conservative hold		Swing		

==== November 1931 ====
1931
Party	Candidate	Votes	%	±%
Conservative	S. P. Dawson*	uncontested		
Conservative hold		Swing		

==== November 1932 ====
1932
Party	Candidate	Votes	%	±%
Conservative	G. H. White*	uncontested		
Conservative hold		Swing		

==== November 1933 ====
1933
Party	Candidate	Votes	%	±%
Conservative	N. Westcott*	uncontested		
Conservative hold		Swing		

==== November 1934 ====
1934
Party	Candidate	Votes	%	±%
Conservative	S. P. Dawson*	3,027	69.1	N/A
Labour	W. Ingham	1,355	30.9	N/A
Majority		1,672	38.2	N/A
Turnout		4,382		
Conservative hold		Swing		

==== November 1935 ====
1935
Party	Candidate	Votes	%	±%
Conservative	G. H. White*	4,072	72.0	+2.9
Labour	W. Ingham	1,585	28.0	−2.9
Majority		2,487	44.0	+4.8
Turnout		5,657		
Conservative hold		Swing		

==== November 1936 ====
1936
Party	Candidate	Votes	%	±%
Conservative	E. Hill	3,590	67.6	−4.4
Labour	W. Ingham	1,722	32.4	+4.4
Majority		1,868	35.2	−8.8
Turnout		5,312		
Conservative hold		Swing		

==== October 1937 (by-election) ====
By-election: 21 October 1937
Party	Candidate	Votes	%	±%
Conservative	W. White	2,687	54.0	−13.6
Liberal	C. Timpson	1,537	30.9	N/A
Labour	P. H. Keeley	751	15.1	−17.3
Majority		1,150	23.1	−12.1
Turnout		4,975		
Conservative hold		Swing		

==== November 1937 ====
1937
Party	Candidate	Votes	%	±%
Conservative	S. P. Dawson*	3,319	73.2	+5.6
Labour	P. H. Keeley	1,214	26.8	−5.6
Majority		2,105	46.4	+11.2
Turnout		4,533		
Conservative hold		Swing		

==== November 1938 ====
1938
Party	Candidate	Votes	%	±%
Conservative	W. White*	3,529	68.3	−4.9
Labour	T. Knowles	1,637	31.7	+4.9
Majority		1,892	36.6	−9.8
Turnout		5,166		
Conservative hold		Swing		

=== Elections in 1940s ===
==== November 1945 ====
1945
Party	Candidate	Votes	%	±%
Conservative	E. Hill*	5,807	62.4	−5.9
Labour	F. Taylor	3,494	37.6	+5.9
Majority		2,313	24.8	−11.8
Turnout		9,301	40.1	
Conservative hold		Swing		

==== November 1946 ====
1946
Party	Candidate	Votes	%	±%
Conservative	S. P. Dawson*	5,619	53.3	−9.1
Labour	F. Siddall	2,833	26.9	−10.7
Liberal	W. H. Wynn	1,943	18.4	N/A
Communist	M. Mandell	151	1.4	N/A
Majority		2,786	26.4	+1.6
Turnout		10,546		
Conservative hold		Swing		

==== November 1947 ====
1947
Party	Candidate	Votes	%	±%
Conservative	W. White*	8,652	63.7	+10.4
Labour	B. Lawson	2,872	21.2	−5.7
Liberal	W. Fleetwood	1,768	13.0	−5.4
Communist	R. H. Hartman	285	2.1	+0.7
Majority		5,780	42.5	+16.1
Turnout		13,577		
Conservative hold		Swing		

==== June 1948 (by-election) ====
By-election: 3 June 1948
Party	Candidate	Votes	%	±%
Conservative	G. C. Hilditch	4,208	66.9	+3.2
Liberal	G. Escott	1,837	29.2	+16.2
Communist	R. H. Hartman	242	3.9	+1.8
Majority		2,371	37.7	−4.8
Turnout		6,287		
Conservative hold		Swing		

==== May 1949 ====
1949
Party	Candidate	Votes	%	±%
Conservative	E. Hill*	7,363	62.8	−0.9
Labour	L. Fern	2,436	20.8	−0.4
Liberal	G. Escott	1,753	15.0	+2.0
Communist	F. Dean	170	1.5	−0.6
Majority		4,927	42.0	−0.5
Turnout		11,722		
Conservative hold		Swing		

=== Elections in 1950s ===
==== May 1950 ====
1950 (new boundaries)
Party	Candidate	Votes	%	±%
Conservative	G. C. Hilditch*	4,326	78.5	
Labour	J. Barlow	1,120	20.3	
Communist	F. Dean	68	1.2	
Majority		3,206	58.2	
Turnout		5,514		
Conservative hold		Swing		

==== May 1951 ====
1951
Party	Candidate	Votes	%	±%
Conservative	W. White*	4,317	84.7	+6.2
Labour	W. Gallacher	777	15.3	−5.0
Majority		3,540	69.4	+11.2
Turnout		5,094		
Conservative hold		Swing		

==== May 1952 ====
1952
Party	Candidate	Votes	%	±%
Conservative	E. Hill*	4,530	77.1	−7.6
Labour	L. L. Hanbridge	1,347	22.9	+7.6
Majority		3,183	54.2	−15.2
Turnout		5,877		
Conservative hold		Swing		

==== May 1953 ====
1953
Party	Candidate	Votes	%	±%
Conservative	D. K. Lee*	4,265	79.9	+2.8
Labour	A. Gregory	1,075	20.1	−2.8
Majority		3,190	59.8	+5.6
Turnout		5,340		
Conservative hold		Swing		

==== May 1954 ====
1954
Party	Candidate	Votes	%	±%
Conservative	W. White*	3,150	62.7	−17.2
Liberal	E. Noble	1,146	22.8	N/A
Labour	S. Carter	727	14.5	−5.6
Majority		2,004	39.9	−19.9
Turnout		5,023		
Conservative hold		Swing		

==== May 1955 ====
1955
Party	Candidate	Votes	%	±%
Conservative	E. Hill*	3,975	69.3	+6.6
Liberal	E. Noble	1,090	19.0	−3.8
Labour	J. S. Goldstone	672	11.7	−2.8
Majority		2,885	50.3	+10.4
Turnout		5,737		
Conservative hold		Swing		

==== May 1956 ====
1956
Party	Candidate	Votes	%	±%
Conservative	D. K. Lee*	2,720	55.5	−13.8
Liberal	E. Noble	1,616	32.9	+13.9
Labour	A. Haslam	569	11.6	−0.1
Majority		1,104	22.6	−27.7
Turnout		4,905		
Conservative hold		Swing		

==== May 1957 ====
1957
Party	Candidate	Votes	%	±%
Conservative	W. White*	2,633	53.3	−3.2
Liberal	M. MacInerney	1,802	35.8	+2.9
Labour	J. Platt	629	12.5	+0.9
Majority		831	16.1	−6.5
Turnout		5,064		
Conservative hold		Swing		

==== October 1957 (by-election) ====
By-election: 17 October 1957
Party	Candidate	Votes	%	±%
Liberal	M. MacInerney	2,216	48.0	+12.2
Conservative	W. A. Murray	1,995	43.2	−10.1
Labour	J. Platt	408	8.8	−3.7
Majority		221	4.8	
Turnout		4,619		
Liberal gain from Conservative		Swing		

==== May 1958 ====
1958
Party	Candidate	Votes	%	±%
Conservative	M. R. Crawford	2,714	46.1	−7.2
Liberal	M. MacInerney*	2,601	44.2	+8.4
Labour	F. Firth	572	9.7	−2.8
Majority		113	1.9	−14.2
Turnout		5,887		
Conservative gain from Liberal		Swing		

==== May 1959 ====
1959
Party	Candidate	Votes	%	±%
Conservative	D. K. Lee*	3,275	53.4	+7.3
Liberal	M. MacInerney	2,400	39.1	−5.1
Labour	A. Williams	462	7.5	−1.2
Majority		875	14.3	+12.4
Turnout		6,137		
Conservative hold		Swing		

=== Elections in 1960s ===
==== May 1960 ====
1960
Party	Candidate	Votes	%	±%
Conservative	W. White*	2,598	50.4	−3.0
Liberal	M. MacInerney	2,175	42.2	+3.1
Labour	H. Conway	378	7.4	−0.1
Majority		423	8.2	−6.1
Turnout		5,151		
Conservative hold		Swing		

==== May 1961 ====
1961
Party	Candidate	Votes	%	±%
Conservative	M. Crawford*	3,281	59.8	+9.4
Liberal	H. Golding	1,695	30.9	−11.3
Labour	A. Haslam	513	9.3	+1.9
Majority		1,586	28.9	+20.7
Turnout		5,489		
Conservative hold		Swing		

==== July 1961 (by-election) ====
By-election: 13 July 1961
Party	Candidate	Votes	%	±%
Conservative	N. Coe	2,113	56.4	−3.4
Liberal	H. Golding	1,299	34.7	+3.8
Labour	A. Haslam	335	8.9	−0.4
Majority		814	21.7	−6.2
Turnout		3,747		
Conservative hold		Swing		

==== May 1962 ====
1962
Party	Candidate	Votes	%	±%
Conservative	D. Lee*	2,753	48.2	−11.6
Liberal	T. MacInerney	2,433	42.6	+11.7
Labour	A. Haslam	525	9.2	−0.1
Majority		320	5.6	−23.3
Turnout		5,711		
Conservative hold		Swing		

==== May 1963 ====
1963
Party	Candidate	Votes	%	±%
Conservative	N. Coe*	2,948	49.3	+1.1
Liberal	T. MacInerney	2,161	36.2	−6.4
Labour	P. J. Donoghue	867	14.5	+5.4
Majority		787	13.1	+7.5
Turnout		5,976		
Conservative hold		Swing		

==== May 1964 ====
1964
Party	Candidate	Votes	%	±%
Conservative	M. R. Crawford*	3,163	58.5	+9.2
Liberal	T. MacInerney	1,464	27.1	−9.1
Labour	H. Barrett	781	14.4	−0.1
Majority		1,699	31.4	+18.3
Turnout		5,408		
Conservative hold		Swing		

==== May 1965 ====
1965
Party	Candidate	Votes	%	±%
Conservative	D. Lee*	3,986	74.6	+16.1
Liberal	S. W. Chinn	696	13.0	−14.1
Labour	H. Smith	661	12.4	−2.0
Majority		3,290	61.6	+30.2
Turnout		5,343		
Conservative hold		Swing		

==== May 1966 ====
1966
Party	Candidate	Votes	%	±%
Conservative	N. Coe*	3,333	79.6	+5.0
Labour	E. Wood	855	20.4	+8.0
Majority		2,478	59.2	−2.4
Turnout		4,188		
Conservative hold		Swing		

==== May 1967 ====
1967
Party	Candidate	Votes	%	±%
Conservative	M. R. Crawford*	3,735	84.0	+4.4
Labour	M. Jowett	710	16.0	−4.4
Majority		3,025	68.0	+8.8
Turnout		4,445		
Conservative hold		Swing		

==== May 1968 ====
1968
Party	Candidate	Votes	%	±%
Conservative	D. Lee*	4,207	78.2	−5.8
Labour	D. Beetham	637	11.8	−4.2
Liberal	S. Rose	540	10.0	N/A
Majority		3,570	66.4	−1.6
Turnout		5,384		
Conservative hold		Swing		

==== October 1968 (by-election) ====
By-election: 17 October 1968
Party	Candidate	Votes	%	±%
Conservative	J. Hill	2,761	74.6	−3.6
Liberal	S. B. Downs	488	13.2	+3.2
Labour	D. Beetham	453	12.2	+0.4
Majority		2,273	61.4	−5.0
Turnout		3,702		
Conservative hold		Swing		

==== May 1969 ====
1969
Party	Candidate	Votes	%	±%
Conservative	J. Duke	3,604	71.5	−6.7
Liberal	S. B. Downs	846	16.8	+6.8
Labour	H. Brown	589	11.7	−0.1
Majority		2,758	54.7	−11.7
Turnout		5,039		
Conservative hold		Swing		

=== Elections in 1970s ===
==== May 1970 ====
1970
Party	Candidate	Votes	%	±%
Conservative	M. R. Crawford*	3,655	66.4	−5.1
Labour	R. W. Ford	1,165	21.2	+9.5
Liberal	J. R. Clements	681	12.4	−4.4
Majority		2,490	45.2	−9.5
Turnout		5,501		
Conservative hold		Swing		

==== May 1971 ====
1971 (3 vacancies; new boundaries)
Party	Candidate	Votes	%	±%
Conservative	M. R. Crawford*	3,793	65.7	
Conservative	J. B. W. Hill*	3,791	65.7	
Conservative	J. Duke*	3,754	65.0	
Labour	H. Evans	1,986	34.4	
Labour	M. Pickstone	1,859	32.2	
Labour	D. Beetham	1,814	31.4	
Communist	D. P. Devine	322	5.6	
Majority		1,768	30.6	
Turnout		5,773		
Conservative win (new seat)				
Conservative win (new seat)				
Conservative win (new seat)				

==== May 1972 ====
1972
Party	Candidate	Votes	%	±%
Conservative	J. Duke*	3,752	74.4	+8.7
Labour	M. Pickstone	1,294	25.6	−8.8
Majority		2,458	48.8	+18.2
Turnout		5,046		
Conservative hold		Swing		

==== May 1973 ====
1973 (3 vacancies; reorganisation)
Party	Candidate	Votes	%	±%
Conservative	J. B. W. Hill*	3,289	72.6	−1.8
Conservative	J. Duke*	3,233	71.4	−3.0
Conservative	M. R. Crawford*	3,216	71.0	−3.4
Labour	W. Murray	1,036	22.9	−2.7
Labour	R. V. Pierson	976	21.5	−4.1
Labour	D. Cox	959	21.2	−4.4
Communist	A. J. Hunt	230	5.1	N/A
Majority		2,180	48.1	−0.7
Turnout		4,531		
Conservative hold		Swing		
Conservative hold		Swing		
Conservative hold		Swing		

==== May 1975 ====
1975
Party	Candidate	Votes	%	±%
Conservative	M. R. Crawford*	3,636	65.8	−6.4
Liberal	R. Johnson	993	18.0	+18.0
Labour	A. J. Bateman	802	14.5	−8.2
Communist	D. Maher	93	1.7	−3.3
Majority		2,643	47.8	+1.8
Turnout		5,524		
Conservative hold		Swing	-12.2	

==== May 1976 ====
1976
Party	Candidate	Votes	%	±%
Conservative	J. Duke*	3,904	65.1	−0.7
Labour	C. B. Muir	1,185	19.8	+5.3
Liberal	T. Kellgren	839	14.0	−4.0
Independent	K. V. M. Brown	72	1.2	+1.2
Majority		2,719	45.3	+7.2
Turnout		6,000		
Conservative hold		Swing	-3.0	

==== May 1978 ====
1978
Party	Candidate	Votes	%	±%
Conservative	J. Hill*	3,902	68.0	+2.9
Labour	E. Newman	1,304	22.7	+2.9
Liberal	J. T. Mitchell	534	9.3	−4.7
Majority		2,598	45.3	−0.0
Turnout		5,740	44.5	
Conservative hold		Swing	-2.9	

==== May 1979 ====
1979
Party	Candidate	Votes	%	±%
Conservative	M. R. Crawford*	5,415	56.4	−11.6
Labour	R. P. Ashby	2,444	25.5	+2.8
Liberal	A. T. Parkinson	1,738	18.1	+8.8
Majority		2,971	31.0	−14.3
Turnout		9,597	76.8	+32.3
Conservative hold		Swing	-7.2	

=== Elections in 1980s ===
==== May 1980 ====
1980
Party	Candidate	Votes	%	±%
Conservative	J. Duke*	3,082	59.2	+2.8
Labour	N. Siddiqi	1,080	20.7	−4.8
Liberal	G. Shaw	1,045	20.1	+2.0
Majority		2,002	38.4	+7.4
Turnout		5,207	41.2	−35.6
Conservative hold		Swing	+3.8	

==== May 1982 ====
1982 (3 vacancies; new boundaries)
Party	Candidate	Votes	%	±%
Conservative	Joyce Hill*	2,912	49.1	
Conservative	John Duke*	2,903	49.0	
Conservative	Muriel Crawford*	2,826	47.7	
SDP	Bernard Lever	1,911	32.2	
Liberal	Ronald Axtell	1,725	29.1	
Liberal	Jack Edwards	1,723	29.1	
Labour	Helen Gregory	970	16.4	
Labour	Vivien Prendiville	946	16.0	
Labour	Richard Ramsden	923	15.6	
Majority		915	15.4	
Turnout		5,927	53.7	
Conservative win (new seat)				
Conservative win (new seat)				
Conservative win (new seat)				

==== May 1983 ====
1983
Party	Candidate	Votes	%	±%
Conservative	Muriel Crawford*	2,877	52.3	+2.1
SDP	John Whitman	1,467	26.7	−6.3
Labour	Gerrard Carroll	1,153	21.0	+4.2
Majority		1,410	25.7	+8.4
Turnout		5,497		
Conservative hold		Swing	+4.2	

==== May 1984 ====
1984
Party	Candidate	Votes	%	±%
Conservative	John Duke*	2,543	48.5	−3.8
Labour	R. Whyte	1,521	29.0	+8.0
SDP	John Whitman	1,181	22.5	−4.2
Majority		1,022	19.5	−6.2
Turnout		5,245		
Conservative hold		Swing	-5.9	

==== May 1986 ====
1986
Party	Candidate	Votes	%	±%
Conservative	J. Hill*	2,575	43.4	−5.1
Labour	G. Bridson	1,896	32.0	+3.0
SDP	A. J. Bateman	1,345	22.7	+0.2
Green	R. Riesco	116	2.0	+2.0
Majority		679	11.4	−8.1
Turnout		5,932		
Conservative hold		Swing	-4.0	

==== May 1987 ====
1987
Party	Candidate	Votes	%	±%
Conservative	Muriel Crawford*	3,635	54.3	+10.9
Labour	Geoffrey Bridson	1,495	22.3	−9.7
SDP	Ann Muir	1,346	20.1	−2.6
Green	Michael Abberton	223	3.3	+1.3
Majority		2,140	31.9	+20.5
Turnout		6,699		
Conservative hold		Swing	+10.3	

==== May 1988 ====
1988
Party	Candidate	Votes	%	±%
Conservative	P. Hilton	3,139	53.9	−0.4
Labour	G. Bridson	1,802	31.0	+8.7
SLD	E. Allen	688	11.8	−8.3
Green	G. Otten	191	3.3	−0.0
Majority		1,337	23.0	−8.9
Turnout		5,820		
Conservative hold		Swing	-4.5	

=== Elections in 1990s ===
==== May 1990 ====
1990
Party	Candidate	Votes	%	±%
Conservative	J. Hill*	2,868	47.0	−6.9
Labour	G. Bridson	2,382	39.0	+8.0
Liberal Democrats	E. Allen	514	8.4	−3.7
Green	M. J. Daw	337	5.5	+2.2
Majority		486	8.0	−15.0
Turnout		6,101		
Conservative hold		Swing	-7.4	

==== May 1991 ====
1991
Party	Candidate	Votes	%	±%
Conservative	W. H. Aikman	3,003	51.5	+4.5
Labour	G. Bridson	1,893	32.4	−6.6
Liberal Democrats	E. Allen	692	11.9	+3.5
Green	R. W. Goater	248	4.2	−1.3
Majority		1,110	19.0	+11.0
Turnout		5,836	52.0	
Conservative hold		Swing	+5.5	

==== May 1992 ====
1992
Party	Candidate	Votes	%	±%
Conservative	P. Hilton*	2,514	50.2	−1.3
Labour	G. Bridson	1,586	31.7	−0.7
Liberal Democrats	J. Lawley	778	15.5	+3.6
Green	R. Goater	131	2.6	−1.6
Majority		928	18.5	−0.5
Turnout		5,009		
Conservative hold		Swing	-0.3	

==== May 1994 ====
1994
Party	Candidate	Votes	%	±%
Labour	G. Bridson	2,319	40.1	+8.4
Conservative	J. Hill*	1,844	31.9	−18.3
Liberal Democrats	J. Lawley	1,494	25.8	+10.3
Green	B. Doherty	125	2.2	−0.4
Majority		475	8.2	−10.3
Turnout		5,782		
Labour gain from Conservative		Swing	+13.3	

==== May 1995 ====
1995
Party	Candidate	Votes	%	±%
Labour	Richard Masztalerz	2,179	43.4	+3.3
Conservative	William Aikman*	1,452	28.9	−3.0
Liberal Democrats	J. Lawley	1,323	26.3	+0.5
Independent	P. Howell	71	1.4	+1.4
Majority		727	14.5	+6.3
Turnout		5,025		
Labour gain from Conservative		Swing	+3.1	

==== May 1996 ====
1996
Party	Candidate	Votes	%	±%
Labour	Pamela Smythe	1,834	38.2	−5.2
Conservative	Peter Hilton*	1,559	32.4	+3.5
Liberal Democrats	David Sandiford	1,352	28.1	+1.8
Residents	K. Harkavy	62	1.3	+1.3
Majority		275	5.7	−8.8
Turnout		4,807		
Labour gain from Conservative		Swing	-4.3	

==== May 1998 ====
1998
Party	Candidate	Votes	%	±%
Labour	Geoffrey Bridson*	1,700	43.5	+5.3
Conservative	Peter Hilton	1,051	26.9	−5.5
Liberal Democrats	David Sandiford	1,009	25.8	−2.3
Green	Tom McGahan	147	3.8	+3.8
Majority		649	16.6	+10.9
Turnout		3,907		
Labour hold		Swing	+5.4	

==== May 1999 ====
1999
Party	Candidate	Votes	%	±%
Liberal Democrats	David Sandiford	1,813	44.6	+18.8
Labour	Frances Ives	1,325	32.6	−10.9
Conservative	Peter Hilton	928	22.8	−4.1
Majority		488	12.0	−4.6
Turnout		4,066	35.1	
Liberal Democrats gain from Labour		Swing	+14.8	

=== Elections in 2000s ===
==== May 2000 ====
2000
Party	Candidate	Votes	%	±%
Liberal Democrats	Tony Parkinson	1,706	44.5	−0.1
Labour	Frances Ives	1,212	31.6	−1.0
Conservative	Peter Hilton	751	19.6	−3.2
Green	Michael Daw	163	4.3	+4.3
Majority		494	12.9	+0.9
Turnout		3,832	34.1	−1.0
Liberal Democrats gain from Labour		Swing	+0.5	

==== May 2002 ====
2002
Party	Candidate	Votes	%	±%
Liberal Democrats	Helen Fisher	1,658	38.0	−6.5
Labour	Geoffrey Bridson*	1,508	34.5	+2.9
Conservative	Peter Hilton	546	12.5	−7.1
Independent	Fergus Kilroy	447	10.2	+10.2
Green	Michael Daw	209	4.8	+0.5
Majority		150	3.4	−9.5
Turnout		4,368	37.0	+2.9
Liberal Democrats gain from Labour		Swing	-4.7	

==== May 2003 ====
2003
Party	Candidate	Votes	%	±%
Liberal Democrats	David Sandiford*	2,116	51.8	+13.8
Labour	Geoffrey Bridson	1,257	30.8	−3.7
Conservative	Peter Hilton	491	12.0	−0.5
Green	Kathryn Brownbridge	223	5.5	+0.7
Majority		859	21.0	+17.6
Turnout		4,087	34.9	−2.1
Liberal Democrats hold		Swing	+8.7	

== See also ==
- Manchester City Council
- Manchester City Council elections
