= Northenden (ward) =

- Ward
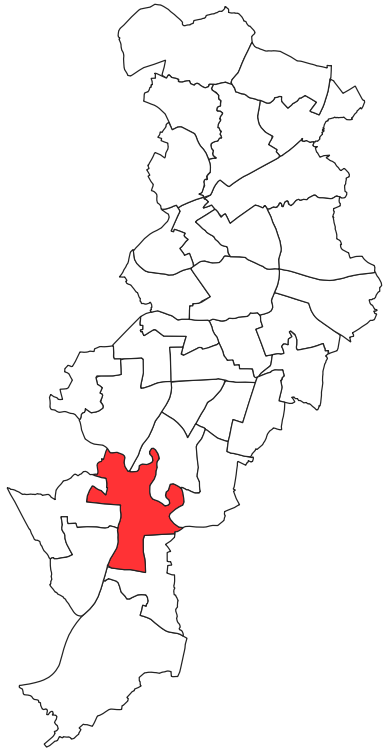
- Northenden ward (2018) within Manchester

- Coat of arms
- Country: United Kingdom
- Constituent country: England
- Region: North West England
- County: Greater Manchester
- Metropolitan borough: Manchester
- Created: May 1950
- Named for: Northenden

Government
  - Type: Unicameral
  - Body: Manchester City Council
- UK Parliamentary Constituency: Wythenshawe and Sale East

Northenden is an electoral division of Manchester City Council which has been represented since 1950. It covers Northenden and parts of the Wythenshawe estate including Benchill and Northern Moor.

== Overview ==
Northenden ward was created in 1950, covering that part of the Wythenshawe ward to the north of the Cheshire Lines Railway. In 1954, following the City Council's successful application to create two new wards for the Wythenshawe estate, that part of the ward to the west of Moor Road was transferred to the new Baguley ward. In 1971, that part of the ward to the west of the M56 motorway was transferred to the new Brooklands ward while that part of the former Benchill ward to the north of Hollyhedge Road was transferred to the ward. Another boundary revision in 1982, a area of the Brooklands ward to the north of Wythenshawe Park was transferred to the ward and its southern boundary became the Cheshire Lines Railway. A further city-wide boundary revision in 2004, transferred the northern portion of the former Benchill ward to the ward. The ward's boundaries were left largely unchanged at the latest revision in 2018.

From its creation until 1997, the ward formed part of the Manchester Wythenshawe Parliamentary constituency. Since 1997, it has formed part of the Wythenshawe and Sale East Parliamentary constituency.

== Councillors ==
Election	Councillor	Councillor	Councillor
1950	L. Jacobs (Con)	T. C. Hewlett (Con)	J. L. Cobon (Con)
1951	L. Jacobs (Con)	T. C. Hewlett (Con)	J. L. Cobon (Con)
1952	L. Jacobs (Con)	T. C. Hewlett (Con)	J. L. Cobon (Con)
1953	L. Jacobs (Con)	T. C. Hewlett (Con)	J. L. Cobon (Con)
1954	L. Jacobs (Con)	T. C. Hewlett (Con)	J. L. Cobon (Con)
1955	L. Jacobs (Con)	T. C. Hewlett (Con)	A. Williamson (Con)
1956	L. Jacobs (Con)	S. N. M. Moxley (Lab)	A. Williamson (Con)
1957	J. S. Goldstone (Lab)	S. N. M. Moxley (Lab)	A. Williamson (Con)
1958	J. S. Goldstone (Lab)	S. N. M. Moxley (Lab)	J. Davis (Lab)
1959	J. S. Goldstone (Lab)	E. A. Walmsley (Con)	J. Davis (Lab)
1960	H. Tucker (Con)	E. A. Walmsley (Con)	J. Davis (Lab)
1961	H. Tucker (Con)	E. A. Walmsley (Con)	G. Leigh (Con)
1962	H. Tucker (Con)	R. L. Griffiths (Lab)	G. Leigh (Con)
1963	F. Firth (Lab)	R. L. Griffiths (Lab)	G. Leigh (Con)
1964	F. Firth (Lab)	R. L. Griffiths (Lab)	G. Leigh (Con)
1965	F. Firth (Lab)	T. Mountford (Con)	G. Leigh (Con)
1966	J. T. Rollins (Con)	T. Mountford (Con)	G. Leigh (Con)
1967	J. T. Rollins (Con)	T. Mountford (Con)	G. Leigh (Con)
1968	J. T. Rollins (Con)	T. Mountford (Con)	G. Leigh (Con)
1969	C. H. Box (Con)	T. Mountford (Con)	G. Leigh (Con)
1970	C. H. Box (Con)	T. Mountford (Con)	G. Leigh (Con)
1971	W. J. Courtney (Lab)	J. M. Wilson (Lab)	G. Berry (Lab)
1972	W. J. Courtney (Lab)	J. M. Wilson (Lab)	G. Leigh (Con)
1973	G. Leigh (Con)	C. H. Box (Con)	D. Mountford (Con)
1975	G. Leigh (Con)	C. H. Box (Con)	D. Mountford (Con)
1976	G. Leigh (Con)	C. H. Box (Con)	D. Mountford (Con)
1978	G. Leigh (Con)	C. H. Box (Con)	D. Mountford (Con)
1979	G. Leigh (Con)	C. H. Box (Con)	W. J. Courtney (Lab)
1980	G. Leigh (Con)	R. A. Reddington (Lab)	W. J. Courtney (Lab)
1982	K. Barnes (Lab)	H. Brown (Lab)	D. Healey (Lab)
1983	K. Barnes (Lab)	H. Brown (Lab)	D. Healey (Lab)
1984	K. Barnes (Lab)	H. Brown (Lab)	D. Healey (Lab)
1986	K. Barnes (Lab)	H. Brown (Lab)	D. Healey (Lab)
1987	K. Barnes (Lab)	H. Brown (Lab)	A. Carroll (Con)
August 1987	B. Slamon (Con)	H. Brown (Lab)	A. Carroll (Con)
1988	B. Slamon (Con)	H. Brown (Lab)	A. Carroll (Con)
June 1988	B. Slamon (Con)	H. Brown (Lab)	A. Carroll (Ind. Con)
September 1988	G. Carroll (Lab)	H. Brown (Lab)	A. Carroll (Ind. Con)
1990	G. Carroll (Lab)	H. Brown (Lab)	A. Carroll (Ind. Con)
1991	G. Carroll (Lab)	H. Brown (Lab)	M. Kane (Lab)
1992	G. Carroll (Lab)	S. Bracegirdle (Lab)	M. Kane (Lab)
1994	G. Carroll (Lab)	S. Bracegirdle (Lab)	M. Kane (Lab)
1995	G. Carroll (Lab)	S. Bracegirdle (Lab)	M. Kane (Lab)
1996	G. Carroll (Lab)	S. Bracegirdle (Lab)	M. Kane (Lab)
1998	R. Cowell (Lab)	S. Bracegirdle (Lab)	M. Kane (Lab)
1999	R. Cowell (Lab)	S. Bracegirdle (Lab)	M. Kane (Lab)
2000	R. Cowell (Lab)	S. Conquest (Lab)	M. Kane (Lab)
2002	R. Cowell (Lab)	S. Conquest (Lab)	M. Kane (Lab)
2003	R. Cowell (Lab)	S. Conquest (Lab)	M. Kane (Lab)
2004	Mike Kane (Lab)	Ian Wilmott (Lab)	Richard Cowell (Lab)
2006	Mike Kane (Lab)	Ian Wilmott (Lab)	Richard Cowell (Lab)
2007	Mike Kane (Lab)	Sandra Bracegirdle (Lab)	Richard Cowell (Lab)
2008	Martin Eakins (Lib Dem)	Sandra Bracegirdle (Lab)	Richard Cowell (Lab)
2010	Martin Eakins (Lib Dem)	Sandra Bracegirdle (Lab)	Mary Di Mauro (Lib Dem)
2011	Martin Eakins (Lib Dem)	Richard Cowell (Lab)	Mary Di Mauro (Lib Dem)
2012	Fran Shone (Lab)	Richard Cowell (Lab)	Mary Di Mauro (Lib Dem)
2014	Fran Shone (Lab)	Richard Cowell (Lab)	Sarah Russell (Lab)
2015	Fran Shone (Lab)	Chris Webb (Lab)	Sarah Russell (Lab)
2016	Mary Monaghan (Lab)	Chris Webb (Lab)	Sarah Russell (Lab)
2018	Mary Monaghan (Lab)	Sam Lynch (Lab)	Sarah Russell (Lab)
2019	Mary Monaghan (Lab)	Sam Lynch (Lab)	Sarah Russell (Lab)
2021	Mary Monaghan (Lab)	Sam Lynch (Lab)	Sarah Russell (Lab)
2022	Angela Moran (Lab)	Sam Lynch (Lab)	Sarah Russell (Lab)
2023	Angela Moran (Lab)	Sam Lynch (Lab)	Richard Fletcher (Lab)
2024	Angela Moran (Lab)	Sam Lynch (Lab)	Richard Fletcher (Lab)
2026	Angela Moran (Lab)	Sam Lynch (Lab)	Richard Fletcher (Lab)

== Elections ==
=== Elections in 2020s ===
==== May 2026 ====
2026
Party	Candidate	Votes	%	±%
Labour	Angela Moran*	1,465	38.1	−27.6
Reform	Chris Soobhug	1,094	28.5	N/A
Green	Tolu Ajayi	851	22.2	+9.3
Conservative	Stephen McHugh	253	6.6	−9.3
Liberal Democrats	Mark Clayton	178	4.6	−1.3
Majority		371	9.7	−40.1
Turnout		3,841	34.3	+10.0
Labour hold		Swing		

==== May 2024 ====
2024
Party	Candidate	Votes	%	±%
Labour	Sam Lynch*	1,741	62.4	1.9 ▲
Green	Sylvia June Buchan	519	18.6	15.5 ▲
Conservative	Ezra McGowan	320	11.5	8.4 ▼
Liberal Democrats	Mark Clayton	164	5.9	1.2 ▲
Majority		1,222	43.8	
Rejected ballots		45	1.6	
Turnout		2,789	25.51	
Registered electors		10,931		
Labour hold		Swing	7.3 ▼	

==== May 2023 ====
2023
Party	Candidate	Votes	%	±%
Labour	Richard Fletcher	1,591	63.5	6.6▲
Green	Sylvia Buchan	389	15.5	Steady
Conservative	Jamie Hoyle	310	12.4	1.5▼
Liberal Democrats	Chris Rogers	158	6.3	2.9▼
Monster Raving Loony	Sir Oink A-Lot	57	2.3	2.3▼
Majority		1,202		
Rejected ballots		10		
Turnout		2,515	23.01	
Registered electors		10,932		
Labour hold		Swing		

==== May 2022 ====
2022
Party	Candidate	Votes	%	±%
Labour	Angela Moran	1,749	65.7	0.5 ▼
Conservative	Daniel Bell	422	15.9	2.2 ▼
Green	Sylvia Buchan	340	12.8	2.1 ▼
Liberal Democrats	Mark Saunders	140	5.3	1.3 ▼
Majority		1,327	49.8	
Rejected ballots		12		
Turnout		2,663	24.3	0.8 ▼
Registered electors		10,977		
Labour hold		Swing	0.9 ▲	

==== May 2021 ====
2021
Party	Candidate	Votes	%	±%
Labour	Sam Lynch*	1,859	60.5	7.5 ▼
Conservative	Stephen McHugh	610	19.9	1.2 ▲
Monster Raving Loony	Sir Oink A-Lot	364	11.9	10.7 ▲
Liberal Democrats	Ellin Saunders	143	4.7	1.9 ▼
Green	Sylvia Buchan	95	3.1	2.4 ▼
Majority		1,249	40.6	
Rejected ballots		22	0.7	
Turnout		3,093	28.0	2.9 ▲
Registered electors		11,032		
Labour hold		Swing	4.4 ▼	

=== Elections in 2010s ===
==== May 2019 ====
2019
Party	Candidate	Votes	%	±%
Labour	Sarah Russell*	1,431	56.9	▲0.5
Green	Simon Gray	389	15.5	▲0.6
Conservative	Ralph Ellerton	349	13.9	▼3.1
Liberal Democrats	Mark Saunders	231	9.2	▲3.2
Independent	Donald Oink A-Lot	117	4.6	▲3.3
Majority		1,042	41.4	▲3.1
Rejected ballots		20	0.79	
Turnout		2,517	23.42	▼2.7
Registered electors		10,832		
Labour hold		Swing	▼0.05	

==== May 2018 ====
2018 (3 vacancies; new boundaries)
Party	Candidate	Votes	%	±%
Labour	Mary Monaghan*	1,803	66.2	
Labour	Sam Lynch	1,694	62.2	
Labour	Sarah Russell*	1,535	56.4	
Conservative	Nigel Geddes	494	18.1	
Conservative	Ezra McGowan	492	18.1	
Green	Simon Gray	407	14.9	
Conservative	Nathan Cruddas	401	14.7	
Liberal Democrats	Maria Storey	181	6.6	
Liberal Democrats	Simon Kirkham	173	6.4	
Liberal Democrats	Paul Waide	134	4.9	
Independent	A-Lot Oink	91	3.3	
Majority				
Turnout		2,723	25.1	
Labour win (new boundaries)				
Labour win (new boundaries)				
Labour win (new boundaries)				

==== May 2016 ====
2016
Party	Candidate	Votes	%	±%
Labour	Mary Theresa Monaghan	2,003	64.1	−0.2
Conservative	Fiona Mary Green	541	17.3	+9.3
Green	Simon James Gray	308	9.9	+2.9
Liberal Democrats	Pablo O'Hana	166	5.3	−7.8
Monster Raving Loony	Johnny Disco	109	3.5	n/a
Majority		1,462	46.8	
Turnout		3,127	28.30	
Labour hold		Swing		

==== May 2015 ====
2015
Party	Candidate	Votes	%	±%
Labour	Chris Webb	3,288	53.4	+5.3
Conservative	Fiona Mary Green	1,068	17.4	+10.5
UKIP	Ian George Fleming	895	14.5	+10.2
Green	Simon Edge	422	6.9	+2.7
Liberal Democrats	Pablo O'Hana	316	5.1	−26.1
Monster Raving Loony	Lord Cameron of Roundwood	110	1.8	N/A
TUSC	Jack Metcalf	55	0.9	N/A
Majority		2,220	36.0	
Turnout		6,154	54.0	+18.3
Labour hold		Swing		

==== May 2014 ====
2014
Party	Candidate	Votes	%	±%
Labour	Sarah Russell	1,842	57.96	
Liberal Democrats	Mary Eileen Di Mauro*	514	16.17	
Conservative	Fiona Mary Green	471	14.82	
Green	Simon Edge	351	11.04	
Majority		1,328	41.8	
Turnout		3,178	28.03	
Labour gain from Liberal Democrats		Swing		

==== May 2012 ====
2012
Party	Candidate	Votes	%	±%
Labour	Fran Shone	1,983	64.3	+20.7
Liberal Democrats	Andrew Hardwick	405	13.1	−30.7
Conservative	Stephen Heath	242	8.0	−0.2
UKIP	Eugene Cassidy	237	7.7	N/A
Green	Chris Gibbins	215	7.0	+2.5
Majority		1,578	51	
Turnout		3,082	27.6	
Labour gain from Liberal Democrats		Swing		

==== May 2011 ====
2011
Party	Candidate	Votes	%	±%
Labour	Richard Cowell	2,111	58.7	+14.1
Liberal Democrats	Dave Nuttall	1,235	31.2	−10.1
Conservative	Phillip Page	272	6.9	−1.6
UKIP	Danielle Brannon	172	4.3	N/A
Green	Chris Gibbins	166	4.2	−1.4
Majority		876	22.1	
Turnout		3,956	35.7	
Labour hold		Swing		

==== May 2010 ====
2010
Party	Candidate	Votes	%	±%
Liberal Democrats	Mary Di Mauro	2,503	42.2	−1.6
Labour	Richard James Cowell*	2,478	41.8	−1.8
Conservative	Steve Whittaker	546	9.2	+1.0
BNP	Sarah Anne Barnes	233	3.9	+3.9
UKIP	Michael Kevin Conlan	166	2.8	+2.8
Majority		25	0.4	+0.2
Turnout		5,926	54.4	+20.7
Liberal Democrats gain from Labour		Swing	+0.1	

=== Elections in 2000s ===
==== May 2008 ====
2008
Party	Candidate	Votes	%	±%
Liberal Democrats	Martin Eakins	1,562	43.8	+2.5
Labour	Michael Kane*	1,554	43.6	−1.0
Conservative	Sarah Lovell	293	8.2	−0.3
Green	Lance Crookes	159	4.5	−1.1
Majority		8	0.2	−3.0
Turnout		3,568	33.7	+2.4
Liberal Democrats gain from Labour		Swing	+1.7	

==== May 2007 ====
2007
Party	Candidate	Votes	%	±%
Labour	Sandra Bracegirdle	1,458	44.6	−2.3
Liberal Democrats	Martin Eakins	1,352	41.3	+5.5
Conservative	Nathan Cruddas	279	8.5	−4.3
Green	Lance Crookes	182	5.6	+1.1
Majority		106	3.2	−7.9
Turnout		3,271	31.3	+2.0
Labour hold		Swing	-3.9	

==== May 2006 ====
2006
Party	Candidate	Votes	%	±%
Labour	Richard James Cowell*	1,431	46.9	+2.2
Liberal Democrats	Martin Clive Eakins	1,092	35.8	+15.7
Conservative	Nathan James Cruddas	391	12.8	−5.2
Green	Lance David Crookes	136	4.5	−12.6
Majority		339	11.1	−13.5
Turnout		3,050	29.3	−3.6
Labour hold		Swing	-6.7	

==== June 2004 ====
2004 (3 vacancies; new boundaries)
Party	Candidate	Votes	%	±%
Labour	Michael Kane*	1,611	47.5	
Labour	Ian Wilmott*	1,360	40.1	
Labour	Richard Cowell*	1,262	37.2	
Liberal Democrats	Marguerite Goldsmith	723	21.3	
Conservative	Ralph Ellerton	650	19.2	
Green	Lance Crookes	618	18.2	
Conservative	Gary Kaye	601	17.7	
Conservative	Mohamed Bhatti	477	14.1	
Liberal Democrats	Angela Bethell	426	12.6	
Liberal Democrats	Howard Totty	406	12.0	
Majority		539	15.9	
Turnout		3,392	32.9	
Labour win (new seat)				
Labour win (new seat)				
Labour win (new seat)				

==== May 2003 ====
2003
Party	Candidate	Votes	%	±%
Labour	Michael Kane*	1,112	57.7	+1.4
Conservative	Ralph Ellerton	359	18.6	−3.5
Liberal Democrats	Marguerite Goldsmith	285	14.8	+1.1
Green	Lance Crookes	171	8.9	+1.0
Majority		753	39.1	+4.9
Turnout		1,927	19.6	−4.0
Labour hold		Swing	+2.4	

==== May 2002 ====
2002
Party	Candidate	Votes	%	±%
Labour	Richard Cowell*	1,324	56.3	+5.4
Conservative	Jane Percival	520	22.1	−2.6
Liberal Democrats	James Mawer	321	13.7	+1.2
Green	Lance Crookes	186	7.9	−4.0
Majority		804	34.2	+7.9
Turnout		2,351	23.6	+4.0
Labour hold		Swing	+4.0	

==== May 2000 ====
2000
Party	Candidate	Votes	%	±%
Labour	Steven Conquest	945	50.9	−9.1
Conservative	Helen Goldthorpe	458	24.7	+7.0
Liberal Democrats	Janice Redmond	231	12.5	+1.3
Green	Lance Crookes	221	11.9	−0.2
Majority		487	26.3	−15.0
Turnout		1,855	19.6	−1.5
Labour hold		Swing	-8.0	

=== Elections in 1990s ===
==== May 1999 ====
1999
Party	Candidate	Votes	%	±%
Labour	Michael Kane*	1,198	60.0	+1.9
Conservative	Richard West	360	17.7	+2.1
Green	Lance Crookes	246	12.1	−3.5
Liberal Democrats	Jeanette McKay	227	11.2	+0.5
Majority		838	41.3	−1.2
Turnout		2,031	21.1	
Labour hold		Swing	-0.1	

==== May 1998 ====
1998
Party	Candidate	Votes	%	±%
Labour	Richard Cowell	1,205	56.2	−12.8
Conservative	Richard West	394	18.4	+0.3
Green	Lance Crookes	324	15.1	+10.8
Liberal Democrats	Jeanette McKay	222	10.3	+1.7
Majority		811	37.8	−13.1
Turnout		2,145		
Labour hold		Swing	-6.5	

==== May 1996 ====
1996
Party	Candidate	Votes	%	±%
Labour	Sandra Bracegirdle*	1,816	69.0	−0.9
Conservative	K. McKenna	476	18.1	+2.6
Liberal Democrats	Ronald Axtell	226	8.6	−3.9
Green	Lance Crookes	113	4.3	+4.3
Majority		1,340	50.9	−3.4
Turnout		2,631		
Labour hold		Swing	-1.7	

==== May 1995 ====
1995
Party	Candidate	Votes	%	±%
Labour	Mike Kane*	2,190	69.9	+2.7
Conservative	K. McKenna	487	15.5	−4.1
Liberal Democrats	Kenneth Lightowler	392	12.5	−0.8
Independent	Lance Crookes	66	2.1	+2.1
Majority		1,703	54.3	+6.7
Turnout		3,135		
Labour hold		Swing	+3.4	

==== May 1994 ====
1994
Party	Candidate	Votes	%	±%
Labour	G. Carroll*	2,490	67.2	+17.3
Conservative	K. McKenna	725	19.6	−21.4
Liberal Democrats	M. Ford	493	13.3	+6.4
Majority		1,765	47.6	+38.8
Turnout		3,708		
Labour hold		Swing	+19.3	

==== May 1992 ====
1992
Party	Candidate	Votes	%	±%
Labour	S. Bracegirdle	1,733	49.9	+2.2
Conservative	R. Caddick	1,426	41.0	+26.0
Liberal Democrats	M. Ford	240	6.9	+0.5
Green	G. Otten	76	2.2	+0.1
Majority		307	8.8	−10.2
Turnout		3,475		
Labour hold		Swing	-11.9	

==== May 1991 ====
1991
Party	Candidate	Votes	%	±%
Labour	Mike Kane	2,233	47.7	−8.0
Ind. Conservative	A. A. Carroll*	1,346	28.8	+28.8
Conservative	G. Parry	701	15.0	−18.6
Liberal Democrats	J. P. Spurway	301	6.4	−0.3
Green	G. Otten	96	2.1	−1.8
Majority		887	19.0	−3.1
Turnout		4,677	47.8	
Labour gain from Ind. Conservative		Swing	-18.4	

==== May 1990 ====
1990
Party	Candidate	Votes	%	±%
Labour	G. Carroll	2,614	55.7	+6.0
Conservative	J. D. Robertson	1,577	33.6	−7.4
Liberal Democrats	R. K. Higginson	316	6.7	−1.4
Green	G. Otten	185	3.9	+2.7
Majority		1,037	22.1	+13.3
Turnout		4,692		
Labour hold		Swing	+6.7	

=== Elections in 1980s ===
==== September 1988 (by-election) ====
By-election: 15 September 1988
Party	Candidate	Votes	%	±%
Labour	G. Carroll	1,794	49.6	−0.1
Conservative	J. Robertson	1,603	44.3	+3.3
SLD	R. K. Higginson	223	6.1	−2.0
Majority		191	5.3	−3.5
Turnout		3,620		
Labour gain from Conservative		Swing		

==== May 1988 ====
1988
Party	Candidate	Votes	%	±%
Labour	H. Brown*	2,175	49.7	+18.4
Conservative	R. Bee	1,792	41.0	+4.0
SLD	R. K. Higginson	354	8.1	−22.5
Green	C. P. Ireland	54	1.2	+0.1
Majority		383	8.8	+3.1
Turnout		4,375		
Labour hold		Swing	+7.2	

==== August 1987 (by-election) ====
By-election: 20 August 1987
Party	Candidate	Votes	%	±%
Conservative	Bernard Slamon	2,080	56.5	+19.5
Labour	William Risby	1,234	33.5	+2.2
Liberal	David Wraxall	318	8.6	−22.0
Green	Sylvia Buchan	52	1.4	+0.3
Majority		846	22.0	+17.3
Turnout		3,684		
Conservative gain from Labour		Swing		

==== May 1987 ====
1987
Party	Candidate	Votes	%	±%
Conservative	Anne Carroll	2,027	37.0	+10.3
Labour	Gabrielle Cox	1,714	31.3	−28.0
Liberal	Michael Otterwell	1,679	30.6	+16.6
Green	Sylvia Buchan	61	1.1	+1.1
Majority		313	5.7	−26.9
Turnout		5,481		
Conservative gain from Labour		Swing	+19.1	

==== May 1986 ====
1986
Party	Candidate	Votes	%	±%
Labour	K. Barnes*	2,716	59.3	+4.7
Conservative	M. Logan	1,223	26.7	−9.2
Liberal	J. Hargreaves	641	14.0	+4.4
Majority		1,493	32.6	+13.9
Turnout		4,580		
Labour hold		Swing	+6.9	

==== May 1984 ====
1984
Party	Candidate	Votes	%	±%
Labour	Harold Brown*	2,529	54.6	+10.2
Conservative	George Leigh	1,662	35.9	−5.9
SDP	L. Shields	444	9.6	−4.2
Majority		867	18.7	+16.1
Turnout		4,635		
Labour hold		Swing	+8.0	

==== May 1983 ====
1983
Party	Candidate	Votes	%	±%
Labour	Duncan Healey*	2,433	44.4	+4.3
Conservative	George Leigh	2,290	41.8	+3.5
SDP	Lawrence Shields	754	13.8	−4.9
Majority		143	2.6	+0.8
Turnout		5,477		
Labour hold		Swing	+0.4	

==== May 1982 ====
1982 (3 vacancies; new boundaries)
Party	Candidate	Votes	%	±%
Labour	Keith Barnes	1,954	39.8	
Labour	Harold Brown	1,890	38.5	
Labour	Duncan Healey	1,881	38.3	
Conservative	George Leigh*	1,865	38.0	
Conservative	Dorothy Mountford	1,694	34.5	
Conservative	John Graham	1,639	33.4	
Liberal	John Holland	911	18.6	
Liberal	Julian Goldstone	888	18.1	
Liberal	Kenneth Lightowler	842	17.2	
Independent	Stanley Rose	137	2.8	
Majority		16	0.3	
Turnout		4,907	47.2	
Labour win (new seat)				
Labour win (new seat)				
Labour win (new seat)				

==== May 1980 ====
1980
Party	Candidate	Votes	%	±%
Labour	R. A. Reddington	2,964	53.5	+7.9
Conservative	C. H. Box*	2,089	37.7	−5.6
Liberal	J. Holland	487	8.8	−1.1
Majority		875	15.8	+13.5
Turnout		5,540	46.2	−28.9
Labour gain from Conservative		Swing	+6.7	

=== Elections in 1970s ===
==== May 1979 ====
1979
Party	Candidate	Votes	%	±%
Labour	W. J. Courtney	4,106	45.6	+1.8
Conservative	D. Mountford*	3,895	43.3	−3.0
Liberal	P. J. Hughes	893	9.9	+0.0
Communist	J. Gandy	104	1.2	+1.2
Majority		211	2.3	−0.3
Turnout		8,998	75.1	+28.2
Labour gain from Conservative		Swing	+2.4	

==== May 1978 ====
1978
Party	Candidate	Votes	%	±%
Conservative	G. Leigh*	2,697	46.3	−5.2
Labour	A. J. Spencer	2,546	43.8	+2.2
Liberal	L. Griffiths	576	9.9	+4.5
Majority		151	2.6	−7.3
Turnout		5,819	46.9	
Conservative hold		Swing	-3.7	

==== May 1976 ====
1976
Party	Candidate	Votes	%	±%
Conservative	C. H. Box*	2,923	51.5	−1.8
Labour	H. Brown	2,359	41.6	+4.6
Liberal	H. Hilton	307	5.4	−4.2
Communist	M. Taylor	82	1.4	+1.4
Majority		564	9.9	−6.4
Turnout		5,671		
Conservative hold		Swing	-3.2	

==== May 1975 ====
1975
Party	Candidate	Votes	%	±%
Conservative	D. Mountford*	2,715	53.3	−0.2
Labour	D. Healey	1,886	37.0	−3.3
Liberal	H. Hilton	490	9.6	+9.6
Majority		829	16.3	+3.1
Turnout		5,091		
Conservative hold		Swing	+1.5	

==== May 1973 ====
1973 (3 vacancies; reorganisation)
Party	Candidate	Votes	%	±%
Conservative	G. Leigh*	2,978	56.5	+4.9
Conservative	C. H. Box	2,737	51.9	+0.3
Conservative	D. Mountford	2,730	51.8	+0.2
Labour	H. Brown	2,244	42.6	−3.5
Labour	H. Reid	2,114	40.1	−6.0
Labour	J. M. Wilson*	2,097	39.8	−6.3
Communist	G. F. Taylor	341	6.5	N/A
Majority		486	9.2	+3.7
Turnout		5,273		
Conservative hold		Swing		
Conservative gain from Labour		Swing		
Conservative gain from Labour		Swing		

==== May 1972 ====
1972
Party	Candidate	Votes	%	±%
Conservative	G. Leigh	2,996	51.6	+4.9
Labour	G. Berry*	2,678	46.1	−7.1
Independent	A. I. A. McLean	131	2.3	N/A
Majority		318	5.5	
Turnout		5,805		
Conservative gain from Labour		Swing		

==== May 1971 ====
1971 (3 vacancies; new boundaries)
Party	Candidate	Votes	%	±%
Labour	W. J. Courtney	3,465	53.2	
Labour	J. M. Wilson	3,420	52.6	
Labour	G. Berry	3,379	51.9	
Conservative	G. Leigh*	3,039	46.7	
Conservative	C. H. Box*	3,007	46.2	
Conservative	T. Mountford*	2,998	46.1	
Communist	E. Jackson	215	3.3	
Majority		340	5.2	
Turnout		6,508		
Labour win (new seat)				
Labour win (new seat)				
Labour win (new seat)				

==== May 1970 ====
1970
Party	Candidate	Votes	%	±%
Conservative	G. Leigh*	3,657	54.1	−13.5
Labour	H. Brown	2,712	40.2	+7.8
Liberal	S. Rose	385	5.7	N/A
Majority		945	13.9	−21.4
Turnout		6,754		
Conservative hold		Swing		

=== Elections in 1960s ===
==== May 1969 ====
1969
Party	Candidate	Votes	%	±%
Conservative	C. H. Box	3,746	67.6	+5.4
Labour	D. Healey	1,793	32.4	+6.7
Majority		1,953	35.3	−1.2
Turnout		5,539		
Conservative hold		Swing		

==== May 1968 ====
1968
Party	Candidate	Votes	%	±%
Conservative	T. Mountford*	3,847	62.2	+1.9
Labour	H. Brown	1,584	25.7	−3.9
Liberal	J. Williams	749	12.1	+2.0
Majority		2,263	36.5	+5.8
Turnout		6,180		
Conservative hold		Swing		

==== May 1967 ====
1967
Party	Candidate	Votes	%	±%
Conservative	G. Leigh*	3,745	60.3	+16.4
Labour	R. L. Griffiths	1,835	29.6	−10.7
Liberal	J. E. Hargreaves	629	10.1	−6.7
Majority		1,910	30.7	+27.1
Turnout		6,209		
Conservative hold		Swing		

==== May 1966 ====
1966
Party	Candidate	Votes	%	±%
Conservative	J. T. Rollins	2,575	43.9	−2.3
Labour	F. Firth*	2,365	40.3	+5.3
Liberal	J. E. Hargreaves	931	15.8	−2.0
Majority		210	3.6	−6.6
Turnout		5,871		
Conservative gain from Labour		Swing		

==== May 1965 ====
1965
Party	Candidate	Votes	%	±%
Conservative	T. Mountford	3,177	46.2	+5.2
Labour	R. L. Griffiths*	2,476	35.0	−3.8
Liberal	J. E. Hargreaves	1,226	17.8	−2.4
Majority		701	10.2	+8.0
Turnout		6,879		
Conservative gain from Labour		Swing		

==== May 1964 ====
1964
Party	Candidate	Votes	%	±%
Conservative	G. Leigh*	2,912	41.0	+13.5
Labour	D. Healey	2,750	38.8	−0.7
Liberal	M. Allen	1,427	20.2	−12.8
Majority		162	2.2	
Turnout		7,089		
Conservative hold		Swing		

==== May 1963 ====
1963
Party	Candidate	Votes	%	±%
Labour	F. Firth	3,213	39.5	+4.9
Liberal	R. H. Hargreaves	2,685	33.0	−1.0
Conservative	H. Tucker*	2,240	27.5	−3.9
Majority		528	6.5	+6.0
Turnout		8,138		
Labour gain from Conservative		Swing		

==== May 1962 ====
1962
Party	Candidate	Votes	%	±%
Labour	R. L. Griffiths	2,680	34.6	+0.1
Liberal	R. H. Hargreaves	2,633	34.0	+6.5
Conservative	E. Walmsley*	2,441	31.4	−6.6
Majority		47	0.5	
Turnout		7,754		
Labour gain from Conservative		Swing		

==== May 1961 ====
1961
Party	Candidate	Votes	%	±%
Conservative	G. Leigh	2,982	38.0	−5.4
Labour	J. Davis*	2,711	34.5	−2.2
Liberal	R. H. Hargreaves	2,160	27.5	+7.6
Majority		271	3.5	−3.2
Turnout		7,853		
Conservative gain from Labour		Swing		

==== May 1960 ====
1960
Party	Candidate	Votes	%	±%
Conservative	H. Tucker	3,241	43.4	+3.8
Labour	R. E. Sheldon	2,743	36.7	−2.3
Liberal	R. H. Hargreaves	1,489	19.9	−1.5
Majority		498	6.7	+6.1
Turnout		7,473		
Conservative gain from Labour		Swing		

=== Elections in 1950s ===
==== May 1959 ====
1959
Party	Candidate	Votes	%	±%
Conservative	E. A. Walmsley	2,648	39.6	+8.4
Labour	R. Sheldon	2,608	39.0	−8.3
Liberal	R. H. Hargreaves	1,434	21.4	−0.1
Majority		40	0.6	
Turnout		6,690		
Conservative gain from Labour		Swing		

==== May 1958 ====
1958
Party	Candidate	Votes	%	±%
Labour	J. Davis	3,232	47.3	−4.9
Conservative	A. Williamson*	2,134	31.2	−16.6
Liberal	R. H. Hargreaves	1,469	21.5	N/A
Majority		1,098	16.1	+7.7
Turnout		6,835		
Labour gain from Conservative		Swing		

==== May 1957 ====
1957
Party	Candidate	Votes	%	±%
Labour	J. S. Goldstone	3,424	52.2	+0.6
Conservative	C. G. Tilley	3,135	47.8	−0.6
Majority		289	4.4	+1.2
Turnout		6,559		
Labour gain from Conservative		Swing		

==== May 1956 ====
1956
Party	Candidate	Votes	%	±%
Labour	S. N. M. Moxley	2,877	51.6	+3.5
Conservative	T. C. Hewlett*	2,700	48.4	−3.5
Majority		177	3.2	
Turnout		5,577		
Labour gain from Conservative		Swing		

==== May 1955 ====
1955
Party	Candidate	Votes	%	±%
Conservative	A. Williamson	3,739	51.9	+1.6
Labour	N. Morris	3,467	48.1	−1.6
Majority		272	3.8	+3.2
Turnout		7,206		
Conservative hold		Swing		

==== May 1954 ====
1954 (new boundaries)
Party	Candidate	Votes	%	±%
Conservative	L. Jacobs*	3,251	50.3	−10.1
Labour	N. Morris	3,208	49.7	+10.1
Majority		43	0.6	−20.2
Turnout		6,459		
Conservative hold		Swing		

==== May 1953 ====
1953
Party	Candidate	Votes	%	±%
Conservative	T. C. Hewlett*	4,432	60.4	+13.8
Labour	W. Gallagher	2,904	39.6	−1.2
Majority		1,528	20.8	+15.0
Turnout		7,336		
Conservative hold		Swing		

==== May 1952 ====
1952
Party	Candidate	Votes	%	±%
Conservative	J. L. Cobon*	3,293	46.6	−20.4
Labour	W. Gallagher	2,882	40.8	+7.8
Liberal	H. Beattie	896	12.6	N/A
Majority		411	5.8	−28.2
Turnout		7,071		
Conservative hold		Swing		

==== May 1951 ====
1951
Party	Candidate	Votes	%	±%
Conservative	L. Jacobs*	4,167	67.0	+4.2
Labour	H. Lloyd	2,053	33.0	−4.2
Majority		2,114	34.0	+8.4
Turnout		6,220		
Conservative hold		Swing		

==== May 1950 ====
1950
Party	Candidate	Votes	%	±%
Conservative	T. C. Hewlett*	3,766	62.8	
Labour	L. Cohen	2,233	37.2	
Majority		1,533	25.6	
Turnout		5,999		
Conservative hold		Swing		

== See also ==
- Manchester City Council
- Manchester City Council elections
