= 1953 Manchester City Council election =

Local election in Manchester, England

- 7 May 1953

36 of 144 seats to Manchester City Council 73 seats needed for a majority
	First party	Second party	Third party
Party	Labour	Conservative	Liberal
Last election	23 seats, 54.8%	15 seats, 43.8%	0 seats, 1.1%
Seats before	70	70	4
Seats won	21	15	0
Seats after	74	66	4
Seat change	▲4	▼4	Steady
Popular vote	105,916	98,104	2,520
Percentage	50.9%	47.2%	1.2%
Swing	▼3.9%	▲3.4%	▲0.1%
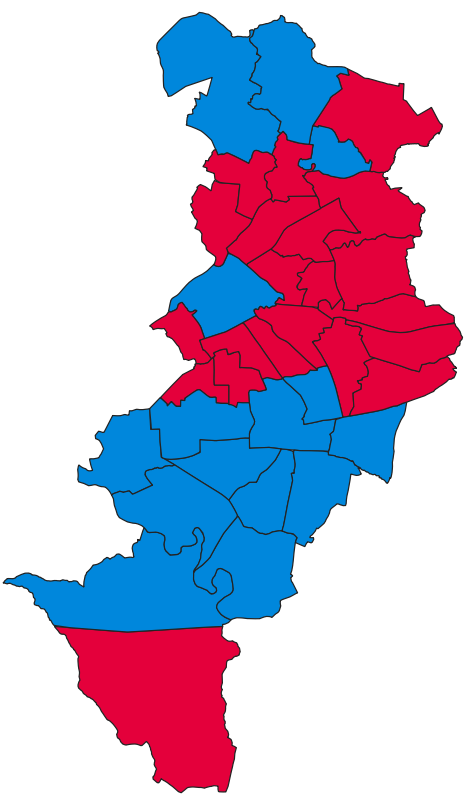
- Map of results of 1953 election
Leader of the Council before election
No overall control
Leader of the Council after election
Labour

Elections to Manchester City Council were held on Thursday, 7 May 1953. One third of the councillors seats were up for election, with each successful candidate to serve a three-year term of office. The Labour Party gained overall control of the council from no overall control.

== Election result ==
Party	Votes		Seats			Full Council	
Labour Party	105,916 (50.9%)	▼3.9	21 (58.3%)	21 / 36	▲4	74 (51.4%)	74 / 144
Conservative Party	98,104 (47.2%)	▲3.4	15 (41.7%)	15 / 36	▼4	66 (45.8%)	66 / 144
Liberal Party	2,520 (1.2%)	▲0.1	0 (0.0%)	0 / 36	Steady	4 (2.8%)	4 / 144
Independent	976 (0.5%)	▲0.4	0 (0.0%)	0 / 36	Steady	0 (0.0%)	0 / 144
Communist	368 (0.2%)	▲0.1	0 (0.0%)	0 / 36	Steady	0 (0.0%)	0 / 144

=== Full council ===
↓
74	4	66

=== Aldermen ===
↓
16	4	16

=== Councillors ===
↓
58	50

== Ward results ==
=== Alexandra Park ===
Alexandra Park
Party	Candidate	Votes	%	±%
Conservative	H. Ward*	4,434	75.9	+4.3
Labour	I. Atkinson	1,406	24.1	−4.7
Majority		3,028	51.8	+9.3
Turnout		5,840		
Conservative hold		Swing		

=== All Saints' ===
All Saints'
Party	Candidate	Votes	%	±%
Labour	J. H. Parish	2,816	61.2	−2.9
Conservative	A. Thornhill*	1,787	38.8	+2.9
Majority		1,029	22.4	−5.8
Turnout		4,603		
Labour gain from Conservative		Swing		

=== Ardwick ===
Ardwick
Party	Candidate	Votes	%	±%
Labour	V. Wilson*	3,502	60.9	0
Conservative	L. Hogg	2,248	39.1	0
Majority		1,254	21.8	0
Turnout		5,750		
Labour hold		Swing		

=== Barlow Moor ===
Barlow Moor
Party	Candidate	Votes	%	±%
Conservative	A. Hooley*	2,331	63.3	+6.2
Labour	F. O'Rourke	1,354	36.7	−6.2
Majority		977	26.6	+12.4
Turnout		3,685		
Conservative hold		Swing		

=== Beswick ===
Beswick
Party	Candidate	Votes	%	±%
Labour	H. Baldwin*	3,499	76.4	+0.8
Conservative	H. Broderick	1,083	23.6	−0.8
Majority		2,416	52.8	+1.6
Turnout		4,582		
Labour hold		Swing		

=== Blackley ===
Blackley
Party	Candidate	Votes	%	±%
Conservative	J. A. Lynch*	4,672	56.2	+6.0
Labour	E. Dell	3,639	43.8	−6.0
Majority		1,033	12.4	+12.0
Turnout		8,311		
Conservative hold		Swing		

=== Bradford ===
Bradford
Party	Candidate	Votes	%	±%
Labour	G. McCall	4,291	71.6	−0.7
Conservative	J. Andrews	1,705	28.4	+0.7
Majority		2,586	43.2	−1.4
Turnout		5,996		
Labour hold		Swing		

=== Burnage ===
Burnage
Party	Candidate	Votes	%	±%
Conservative	L. W. Biggs*	4,220	59.1	+3.0
Labour	L. L. Hanbridge	2,918	40.9	−3.0
Majority		1,302	18.2	+6.0
Turnout		7,138		
Conservative hold		Swing		

=== Cheetham ===
Cheetham
Party	Candidate	Votes	%	±%
Labour	M. P. Pariser*	2,455	48.9	−14.1
Conservative	E. Mawdsley	1,634	32.5	−4.5
Liberal	S. Needoff	935	18.6	N/A
Majority		821	16.4	−9.6
Turnout		5,024		
Labour hold		Swing		

=== Chorlton-cum-Hardy ===
Chorlton-cum-Hardy
Party	Candidate	Votes	%	±%
Conservative	G. W. G. Fitzsimons*	4,471	79.3	+5.6
Labour	C. E. Bedgood	1,166	20.7	−5.6
Majority		3,305	58.6	+11.2
Turnout		5,637		
Conservative hold		Swing		

=== Collegiate Church ===
Collegiate Church
Party	Candidate	Votes	%	±%
Labour	E. Mendell*	2,760	78.1	−2.5
Conservative	R. E. Talbot	591	16.7	+0.7
Communist	M. I. Druck	184	5.2	+1.8
Majority		2,169	61.4	−3.2
Turnout		3,535		
Labour hold		Swing		

=== Crumpsall ===
Crumpsall
Party	Candidate	Votes	%	±%
Conservative	R. Collier*	4,189	58.5	+4.1
Labour	E. Mellor	2,972	41.5	−4.1
Majority		1,217	17.0	+8.2
Turnout		7,161		
Conservative hold		Swing		

=== Didsbury ===
Didsbury
Party	Candidate	Votes	%	±%
Conservative	D. K. Lee*	4,265	79.9	+2.8
Labour	A. Gregory	1,075	20.1	−2.8
Majority		3,190	59.8	+5.6
Turnout		5,340		
Conservative hold		Swing		

=== Gorton North ===
Gorton North
Party	Candidate	Votes	%	±%
Labour	F. Siddall*	4,692	70.3	−4.0
Conservative	A. P. Osborn	1,801	27.0	+4.0
Communist	J. Kay	184	2.7	0
Majority		2,891	43.3	−8.0
Turnout		6,677		
Labour hold		Swing		

=== Gorton South ===
Gorton South
Party	Candidate	Votes	%	±%
Labour	J. Sutton*	3,020	64.6	−4.7
Conservative	L. J. Naden	1,657	35.4	+4.7
Majority		1,363	29.2	−9.4
Turnout		4,677		
Labour hold		Swing		

=== Harpurhey ===
Harpurhey
Party	Candidate	Votes	%	±%
Labour	E. Grant*	3,617	54.4	−7.2
Conservative	P. H. Craig	3,038	45.6	+7.2
Majority		579	8.8	−14.4
Turnout		6,655		
Labour hold		Swing		

=== Levenshulme ===
Levenshulme
Party	Candidate	Votes	%	±%
Conservative	R. A. Fieldhouse*	3,115	48.0	−9.1
Labour	F. Hatton	2,371	36.6	−6.3
Liberal	G. P. Robinson	1,001	15.4	N/A
Majority		744	11.4	−2.8
Turnout		6,487		
Conservative hold		Swing		

=== Lightbowne ===
Lightbowne
Party	Candidate	Votes	%	±%
Conservative	H. Piggott*	4,742	56.1	+9.8
Labour	G. Halstead	3,709	43.9	−3.0
Majority		1,033	12.2	+11.6
Turnout		8,451		
Conservative hold		Swing		

=== Longsight ===
Longsight
Party	Candidate	Votes	%	±%
Conservative	H. Sharp*	3,161	55.1	+1.8
Labour	J. Davis	1,996	35.8	−2.2
Liberal	F. N. Wedlock	584	10.1	+0.4
Majority		1,265	20.3	+4.0
Turnout		5,741		
Conservative hold		Swing		

=== Miles Platting ===
Miles Platting
Party	Candidate	Votes	%	±%
Labour	W. C. Chadwick*	2,840	70.3	−2.6
Conservative	M. V. Sparks	1,200	29.7	+2.6
Majority		1,640	40.6	−5.2
Turnout		4,040		
Labour hold		Swing		

=== Moss Side East ===
Moss Side East
Party	Candidate	Votes	%	±%
Labour	P. V. Wood	2,661	48.6	−10.4
Conservative	G. J. Playford*	2,235	40.9	−0.1
Independent	C. Cuffin	575	10.5	N/A
Majority		426	7.7	−10.3
Turnout		5,471		
Labour gain from Conservative		Swing		

=== Moss Side West ===
Moss Side West
Party	Candidate	Votes	%	±%
Labour	B. Lawson	2,833	50.2	−1.4
Conservative	C. Brewster*	2,813	49.8	+2.8
Majority		20	0.4	−4.2
Turnout		5,646		
Labour gain from Conservative		Swing		

=== Moston ===
Moston
Party	Candidate	Votes	%	±%
Labour	W. M. McGuirk*	4,033	53.1	−7.2
Conservative	W. H. T. Quick	3,560	46.9	+7.2
Majority		473	6.2	−14.4
Turnout		7,603		
Labour hold		Swing		

=== New Cross ===
New Cross
Party	Candidate	Votes	%	±%
Labour	W. Murray*	2,580	65.8	−0.8
Conservative	E. Griffiths	1,339	34.2	+4.2
Majority		1,241	31.6	−5.0
Turnout		3,919		
Labour hold		Swing		

=== Newton Heath ===
Newton Heath
Party	Candidate	Votes	%	±%
Labour	J. Bates	3,375	66.8	−2.8
Conservative	W. H. Priestnall	1,679	33.2	+2.8
Majority		1,696	33.6	−5.6
Turnout		5,054		
Labour hold		Swing		

=== Newtown ===
Newtown
Party	Candidate	Votes	%	±%
Labour	J. B. Ogden*	3,091	77.0	−4.7
Conservative	A. Gregory	925	23.0	+4.7
Majority		2,166	54.0	−9.4
Turnout		4,016		
Labour hold		Swing		

=== Northenden ===
Northenden
Party	Candidate	Votes	%	±%
Conservative	T. C. Hewlett*	4,432	60.4	+13.8
Labour	W. Gallagher	2,904	39.6	−1.2
Majority		1,528	20.8	+15.0
Turnout		7,336		
Conservative hold		Swing		

=== Old Moat ===
Old Moat
Party	Candidate	Votes	%	±%
Conservative	W. Sharp*	3,366	63.6	+5.8
Labour	W. A. Dove	1,928	36.4	−5.8
Majority		1,438	27.2	+11.6
Turnout		5,294		
Conservative hold		Swing		

=== Openshaw ===
Openshaw
Party	Candidate	Votes	%	±%
Labour	T. Nally*	4,295	70.6	−3.9
Conservative	L. Lescure	1,788	29.4	+3.9
Majority		2,507	41.2	−7.8
Turnout		6,083		
Labour hold		Swing		

=== Rusholme ===
Rusholme
Party	Candidate	Votes	%	±%
Conservative	R. C. Rodgers*	3,832	70.0	+4.9
Labour	B. Conlan	1,640	30.0	−4.9
Majority		2,192	40.0	+9.8
Turnout		5,472		
Conservative hold		Swing		

=== St. George's ===
St. George's
Party	Candidate	Votes	%	±%
Labour	G. Mann	3,273	65.0	−6.1
Conservative	H. Spencer	1,763	35.0	+6.1
Majority		1,510	30.0	−12.2
Turnout		5,036		
Labour hold		Swing		

=== St. Luke's ===
St. Luke's
Party	Candidate	Votes	%	±%
Labour	F. P. Evans	2,755	50.5	−6.6
Conservative	W. E. A. Yates*	2,698	49.5	+2.4
Majority		57	1.0	−3.0
Turnout		5,453		
Labour gain from Conservative		Swing		

=== St. Mark's ===
St. Mark's
Party	Candidate	Votes	%	±%
Labour	J. W. Ellershaw*	3,709	67.4	−0.1
Conservative	E. A. Leggett	1,791	32.6	+0.1
Majority		1,918	34.8	−0.2
Turnout		5,500		
Labour hold		Swing		

=== St. Peter's ===
St. Peter's
Party	Candidate	Votes	%	±%
Conservative	H. D. Parks*	1,886	63.5	0
Labour	H. W. Bliss	1,083	36.5	0
Majority		803	27.0	0
Turnout		2,969		
Conservative hold		Swing		

=== Withington ===
Withington
Party	Candidate	Votes	%	±%
Conservative	W. H. Scholfield*	3,689	80.4	+12.5
Labour	R. L. Griffiths	899	19.6	+0.6
Majority		2,790	60.8	+11.9
Turnout		4,588		
Conservative hold		Swing		

=== Wythenshawe ===
Wythenshawe
Party	Candidate	Votes	%	±%
Labour	H. S. Gatley*	8,759	63.3	−6.7
Conservative	A. Williamson	4,684	33.8	+3.8
Independent	F. Frost	401	2.9	N/A
Majority		4,075	29.5	−10.5
Turnout		13,844		
Labour hold		Swing		

== By-elections between 1953 and 1954 ==
=== Moss Side East, 2 July 1953 ===
Caused by the election as an alderman of Councillor John Edward Pheasey (Conservative, Moss Side East, elected 15 May 1934) on 29 April 1953 following the death on 18 April 1953 of Alderman Harold White (Conservative, elected as an alderman by the council on 6 October 1937).

Moss Side East
Party	Candidate	Votes	%	±%
Labour	E. Dell	2,629	51.5	+2.9
Conservative	G. J. Playford	2,107	41.3	+0.4
Independent	C. Cuffin	424	8.2	−2.3
Majority		522	10.2	+2.5
Turnout		5,160		
Labour gain from Conservative		Swing		

=== Gorton North, 10 December 1953 ===
Caused by the death of Councillor Charles Bentley (Labour, Gorton North, elected 4 October 1944) on 1 September 1953.

Gorton North
Party	Candidate	Votes	%	±%
Labour	P. Roddy	3,183	69.4	−0.9
Conservative	C. N. Clarke	1,292	28.2	+1.2
Communist	J. Kay	114	2.4	−0.3
Majority		1,891	41.2	−2.1
Turnout		4,589		
Labour hold		Swing		
