= Moston (ward) =

- Ward
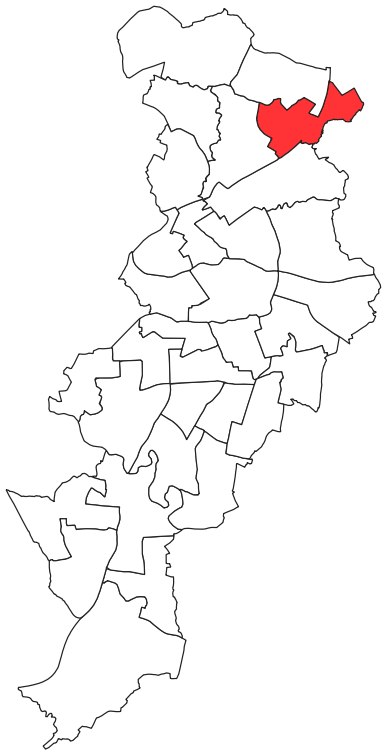
- Moston ward (2018) within Manchester

- Coat of arms
- Country: United Kingdom
- Constituent country: England
- Region: North West England
- County: Greater Manchester
- Metropolitan borough: Manchester
- Created: November 1919
- Named for: Moston

Government
  - Type: Unicameral
  - Body: Manchester City Council
- UK Parliamentary Constituency: Blackley and Middleton South

Moston is an electoral division of Manchester City Council which has been represented since 1919. It covers the North Manchester suburbs of Moston and New Moston.

== Overview ==
Moston ward was created in 1919, from a portion of the former Blackley and Moston ward to the east of Boggart Hole Brook. In 1950, the southern portion of the ward was transferred to the new Lightbowne ward. Further revisions in 1971, transferred that part of the ward to the west of Moston Lane to the new Charlestown ward. In 1982, the westernmost portion of the ward was transferred to the Lightbowne ward. Following another revision in 2004, the eastern portion of the former Lightbowne ward was transferred to the ward and that part of the ward to the west of the Caldervale Line was transferred to the Charlestown ward. At the latest revision in 2018, the ward's western boundary was extended to Ashley Lane.

From its creation until 2010, the ward formed part of the Manchester Blackley Parliamentary constituency. From 2010 until 2024, it was part of the Manchester Central Parliamentary constituency. Since 2024, it has formed part of the Blackley and Middleton South Parliamentary constituency.

== Councillors ==
Election	Councillor	Councillor	Councillor
1919	W. R. Mellor (Lab)	F. Gregson (Lab)	T. Horrocks (Co-op)
1920	W. R. Mellor (Lab)	F. Gregson (Lab)	J. Bostock (Con)
1921	W. R. Mellor (Lab)	B. Frankland (Con)	J. Bostock (Con)
1922	W. R. Mellor (Lab)	B. Frankland (Con)	J. Bostock (Con)
1923	W. R. Mellor (Lab)	B. Frankland (Con)	M. Welsh (Lab)
1924	W. R. Mellor (Lab)	G. G. Wellings (Lab)	M. Welsh (Lab)
1925	W. R. Mellor (Lab)	G. G. Wellings (Lab)	M. Welsh (Lab)
1926	W. R. Mellor (Lab)	G. G. Wellings (Lab)	M. Welsh (Lab)
September 1927	W. R. Mellor (Lab)	G. G. Wellings (Lib)	M. Welsh (Lab)
1927	W. R. Mellor (Lab)	F. Farrington (Con)	M. Welsh (Lab)
1928	W. R. Mellor (Lab)	F. Farrington (Con)	M. Welsh (Lab)
1929	W. R. Mellor (Lab)	F. Farrington (Con)	F. Gregson (Lab)
1930	W. R. Mellor (Lab)	F. Farrington (Con)	F. Gregson (Lab)
1931	W. R. Mellor (Lab)	F. Farrington (Con)	F. Gregson (Lab)
1932	W. R. Mellor (Lab)	F. Farrington (Con)	F. Gregson (Lab)
1933	W. R. Mellor (Lab)	F. Farrington (Con)	F. Gregson (Lab)
March 1934	W. Onions (Lab)	F. Farrington (Con)	F. Gregson (Lab)
1934	W. Onions (Lab)	F. Farrington (Con)	F. Gregson (Lab)
1935	W. Onions (Lab)	F. Farrington (Con)	F. Gregson (Lab)
1936	W. Onions (Lab)	F. Farrington (Con)	F. Gregson (Lab)
1937	W. Onions (Lab)	F. Farrington (Con)	F. Gregson (Lab)
1938	W. Onions (Lab)	F. Farrington (Con)	F. Gregson (Lab)
1945	W. Onions (Lab)	C. C. Lamb (Lab)	F. Gregson (Lab)
1946	W. Onions (Lab)	C. C. Lamb (Lab)	F. Gregson (Lab)
January 1947	W. Onions (Lab)	C. C. Lamb (Lab)	M. Dunn (Con)
1947	W. Onions (Lab)	C. C. Lamb (Lab)	M. Dunn (Con)
1949	W. Onions (Lab)	C. C. Lamb (Lab)	M. Dunn (Con)
1950	W. M. McGuirk (Lab)	C. C. Lamb (Lab)	M. Dunn (Con)
1951	W. M. McGuirk (Lab)	C. C. Lamb (Lab)	M. Dunn (Con)
1952	W. M. McGuirk (Lab)	C. C. Lamb (Lab)	M. Dunn (Con)
1953	W. M. McGuirk (Lab)	C. C. Lamb (Lab)	M. Dunn (Con)
1954	W. M. McGuirk (Lab)	C. C. Lamb (Lab)	R. Latham (Lab)
1955	W. M. McGuirk (Lab)	C. C. Lamb (Lab)	R. Latham (Lab)
1956	W. M. McGuirk (Lab)	C. C. Lamb (Lab)	R. Latham (Lab)
1957	W. M. McGuirk (Lab)	C. C. Lamb (Lab)	R. Latham (Lab)
1958	W. M. McGuirk (Lab)	C. C. Lamb (Lab)	R. Latham (Lab)
1959	K. E. Goulding (Con)	C. C. Lamb (Lab)	R. Latham (Lab)
1960	K. E. Goulding (Con)	C. C. Lamb (Lab)	B. H. Farron (Con)
1961	K. E. Goulding (Con)	C. C. Lamb (Lab)	B. H. Farron (Con)
1962	R. Latham (Lab)	C. C. Lamb (Lab)	B. H. Farron (Con)
September 1962	R. Latham (Lab)	G. Halstead (Lab)	B. H. Farron (Con)
1963	R. Latham (Lab)	G. Halstead (Lab)	W. R. Barber (Lab)
1964	R. Latham (Lab)	G. Halstead (Lab)	W. R. Barber (Lab)
December 1964	R. Latham (Lab)	G. Halstead (Lab)	A. Wray (Con)
1965	R. H. Hine (Con)	G. Halstead (Lab)	A. Wray (Con)
1966	R. H. Hine (Con)	G. Halstead (Lab)	A. Wray (Con)
1967	R. H. Hine (Con)	T. W. Bamford (Con)	A. Wray (Con)
1968	R. H. Hine (Con)	T. W. Bamford (Con)	A. Wray (Con)
1969	A. Wray (Con)	T. W. Bamford (Con)	J. T. Crawford (Con)
1970	A. Wray (Con)	A. E. Bowden (Lab)	J. T. Crawford (Con)
1971	A. E. Bowden (Lab)	W. T. Risby (Lab)	W. Lister (Lab)
1972	A. E. Bowden (Lab)	W. T. Risby (Lab)	K. E. Goulding (Con)
1973	A. E. Bowden (Lab)	K. E. Goulding (Con)	C. C. Lamb (Lab)
1975	A. E. Bowden (Lab)	K. E. Goulding (Con)	G. I. Jones (Con)
1976	A. E. Bowden (Lab)	K. E. Goulding (Con)	G. I. Jones (Con)
1978	G. Hurley (Con)	K. E. Goulding (Con)	G. I. Jones (Con)
1979	G. Hurley (Con)	K. E. Goulding (Con)	C. McLaren (Lab)
1980	G. Hurley (Con)	D. Shaw (Lab)	C. McLaren (Lab)
1982	C. McLaren (Lab)	K. E. Goulding (Con)	W. T. Risby (Lab)
1983	C. McLaren (Lab)	K. E. Goulding (Con)	W. T. Risby (Lab)
1984	C. McLaren (Lab)	L. Kelly (Lab)	W. T. Risby (Lab)
1986	C. McLaren (Lab)	L. Kelly (Lab)	W. T. Risby (Lab)
1987	C. McLaren (Lab)	L. Kelly (Lab)	J. Clough (Con)
1988	C. McLaren (Lab)	L. Kelly (Lab)	J. Clough (Con)
1990	D. Shaw (Lab)	L. Kelly (Lab)	J. Clough (Con)
1991	D. Shaw (Lab)	L. Kelly (Lab)	H. Cooper (Lab)
1992	D. Shaw (Lab)	M. Enderby (Lab)	H. Cooper (Lab)
1994	D. Shaw (Lab)	M. Enderby (Lab)	H. Cooper (Lab)
1995	D. Shaw (Lab)	M. Enderby (Lab)	H. Cooper (Lab)
July 1995	D. Shaw (Lab)	P. Mullin (Lab)	H. Cooper (Lab)
1996	D. Shaw (Lab)	P. Mullin (Lab)	H. Cooper (Lab)
1998	D. Shaw (Lab)	P. Mullin (Lab)	H. Cooper (Lab)
1999	D. Shaw (Lab)	P. Mullin (Lab)	H. Cooper (Lab)
2000	D. Shaw (Lab)	P. Mullin (Lab)	H. Cooper (Lab)
2002	D. Shaw (Lab)	P. Mullin (Lab)	H. Cooper (Lab)
2003	D. Shaw (Lab)	P. Mullin (Lab)	H. Cooper (Lab)
2004	Paul Murphy (Lab)	Henry Cooper (Lab)	Bill Risby (Lab)
2004	Paul Murphy (Lab)	Henry Cooper (Lab)	Bill Risby (Lab)
2006	Paul Murphy (Lab)	Henry Cooper (Lab)	Bill Risby (Lab)
2007	Paul Murphy (Lab)	Henry Cooper (Lab)	Bill Risby (Lab)
2008	Paul Murphy (Lab)	Henry Cooper (Lab)	Bill Risby (Lab)
April 2009	Paul Murphy (Lab)	Henry Cooper (Lab)	Rita Tavernor (Lab)
2010	Paul Murphy (Lab)	Henry Cooper (Lab)	Rita Tavernor (Lab)
2011	Paul Murphy (Lab)	Henry Cooper (Lab)	Rita Tavernor (Lab)
2012	Paul Murphy (Lab)	Henry Cooper (Lab)	Rita Tavernor (Lab)
2012	Paul Murphy (Lab)	Henry Cooper (Lab)	Rita Tavernor (Lab)
January 2013	Paul Murphy (Lab)	Henry Cooper (Ind. Lab)	Rita Tavernor (Lab)
2014	Paul Murphy (Lab)	Henry Cooper (Ind. Lab)	Yasmine Dar (Lab)
2015	Paul Murphy (Lab)	Paula Appleby (Lab)	Yasmine Dar (Lab)
2016	Carl Ollerhead (Lab)	Paula Appleby (Lab)	Yasmine Dar (Lab)
2018	Paula Appleby (Lab)	Carl Ollerhead (Lab)	Yasmine Dar (Lab)
2019	Paula Appleby (Lab)	Carl Ollerhead (Lab)	Yasmine Dar (Lab)
June 2020	Paula Appleby (Lab)	Carl Ollerhead (Ind)	Yasmine Dar (Lab)
2021	Paula Appleby (Lab)	Julie Connolly (Lab)	Yasmine Dar (Lab)
2022	Paula Appleby (Lab)	Julie Connolly (Lab)	Yasmine Dar (Lab)
2023	Paula Appleby (Lab)	Julie Connolly (Lab)	Yasmine Dar (Lab)
2024	Paula Appleby (Lab)	Sherita Mandongwe (Lab)	Yasmine Dar (Lab)
2026	Blake Fisher (Ref UK)	Sherita Mandongwe (Lab)	Yasmine Dar (Lab)

== Elections ==
=== Elections in 2020s ===
==== May 2026 ====
2026
Party	Candidate	Votes	%	±%
Reform	Blake Fisher	1,683	40.8	N/A
Labour	Paula Appleby*	1,498	36.3	−32.6
Green	Diane Kosandiak	753	18.3	+10.6
Liberal Democrats	Norman Lewis	188	4.6	+0.8
Majority		185	4.5	N/A
Turnout		4,122	31.2	+8.4
Reform gain from Labour		Swing		

==== May 2024 ====
2024
Party	Candidate	Votes	%	±%
Labour	Sherita Mandongwe	1,982	60.8	4.2 ▼
Green	Diane Lilian Kosandiak	464	14.2	4.7 ▲
Conservative	Popoola Stephen Alabi	452	13.9	6.9 ▼
Liberal Democrats	John Cameron	285	8.7	5.2 ▲
Majority		1,518	46.6	
Rejected ballots		76	2.3	
Turnout		3,259	24.66	
Registered electors		13,216		
Labour hold		Swing	4.4 ▼	

==== May 2023 ====
2023
Party	Candidate	Votes	%	±%
Labour	Yasmine Dar*	1,859	64.6	18.1▲
Conservative	Popoola Alabi	484	16.8	6.7▲
Green	Diane Kosandiak	305	10.6	4.7▲
Liberal Democrats	Elizabeth Bain	228	7.9	4.1▲
Majority		1,375		
Rejected ballots		18		
Turnout			22.27	
Registered electors		12,996		
Labour hold		Swing		

==== May 2022 ====
2022
Party	Candidate	Votes	%	±%
Labour	Paula Appleby*	2,049	68.9	3.2 ▼
Conservative	Popoola Alabi	540	18.2	3.3 ▼
Green	Dianne Kosandiak	228	7.7	4.4 ▼
Liberal Democrats	Martha O'Donoghue	113	3.8	n/a
Independent	Hugo Wils	30	1.0	n/a
Majority		1,509	50.7	
Rejected ballots		16		
Turnout		2,976	22.8	3.2 ▼
Registered electors		13,049		
Labour hold		Swing	0.1 ▲	

==== May 2021 ====
2021
Party	Candidate	Votes	%	±%
Labour	Julie Connolly	2,249	65.0	7.2 ▼
Conservative	Stephen Alabi	719	20.8	2.3 ▼
Green	Diane Kosandiak	328	9.5	4.8 ▲
Liberal Democrats	Robbie Cowbury	122	3.5	New
Independent	Hugo Wils	43	1.2	New
Majority		1,530	44.2	
Rejected ballots		27	0.8	
Turnout		3,488	26.5	0.5 ▲
Registered electors		13,143		
Labour hold		Swing	2.5 ▼	

=== Elections in 2010s ===
==== May 2019 ====
2019
Party	Candidate	Votes	%	±%
Labour	Yasmine Dar*	1,430	46.5	▼10.1
Independent	Mike Pattillo	527	17.1	n/a
UKIP	Mark Davies	467	15.1	n/a
Conservative	Stephen McHugh	309	10.1	▼9.8
Green	Eithne Quinn	181	5.9	▼6.2
Liberal Democrats	Charles Glover	118	3.8	n/a
Socialist	Grace Donaghey	25	0.8	n/a
Majority		901	29.3	▼5.8
Rejected ballots		17	0.55	
Turnout		3,074	24.02	▼2.0
Registered electors		12,797		
Labour hold		Swing	▼13.6	

==== May 2018 ====
2018 (3 vacancies; new boundaries)
Party	Candidate	Votes	%	±%
Labour	Paula Appleby*	2,407	72.1	
Labour	Carl Ollerhead*	1,938	58.0	
Labour	Yasmine Dar*	1,889	56.6	
Conservative	John Boase	718	21.5	
Conservative	Callum Goodier	656	19.6	
Conservative	Gary Wilkinson	616	18.4	
Green	Eithne Quinn	405	12.1	
Majority				
Turnout		3,340	26	
Labour win (new boundaries)				
Labour win (new boundaries)				
Labour win (new boundaries)				

==== May 2016 ====
2016
Party	Candidate	Votes	%	±%
Labour	Carl Peter Ollerhead*	1,899	56.7	+2.9
UKIP	Phil Eckersley	899	26.8	n/a
Conservative	Hector James Robertson Williams	301	9.0	+1.3
Green	Eithne Quinn	118	3.5	+0.2
Liberal Democrats	Dave Page	102	3.04	n/a
TUSC	Jack Joseph Metcalf	33	0.98	n/a
Majority		1,000	29.8	
Turnout		3,352	30.28	
Labour hold		Swing		

==== May 2015 ====
2015
Party	Candidate	Votes	%	±%
Labour	Paula Elizabeth Appleby	3,153	49.4	−12.7
UKIP	Mike Pattillo	2,001	31.4	N/A
Conservative	Daniel Kallmunzer	729	11.4	−3.3
Green	James Kenneth Thorp	201	3.2	−2.6
Liberal Democrats	Bernadette Ryan	185	2.9	−5.8
BNP	Gareth Black	66	1.0	−7.7
TUSC	Molly Tillett	29	0.5	N/A
Communist League	Andres Alberto Mendoza	13	0.2	N/A
Majority		1,152	18.0	
Turnout		6,377	56.1	+23.6
Labour gain from Independent Labour		Swing		

==== May 2014 ====
2014
Party	Candidate	Votes	%	±%
Labour	Yasmine Dar	1,543	42.55	
UKIP	Nigel F. Houston	1,406	38.78	
Conservative	Daniel Kallmunzer	321	8.85	
Green	Luke James Smith	203	5.60	
BNP	Stephen Carden	153	4.22	
Majority		137	3.8	
Turnout		3,626	31.38	
Labour hold		Swing		

==== May 2012 ====
2012
Party	Candidate	Votes	%	±%
Labour	Paul Murphy*	1,801	53.8	+4.3
Independent	Bob Hill	930	27.8	N/A
Conservative	H.C.H. Hill	257	7.7	−22.2
BNP	Gareth Black	251	7.5	N/A
Green	Barnaby Wolfram	111	3.3	−4.6
Majority		871	26	
Turnout		3,350	30.06	
Labour hold		Swing		

==== May 2011 ====
2011
Party	Candidate	Votes	%	±%
Labour	Henry Cooper*	2,234	62.1	+6.6
Conservative	Steven Booth	528	14.7	−5.4
BNP	John O'Shaughnessy	313	8.7	N/A
Liberal Democrats	Tim Hartley	312	8.7	−1.2
Green	Mary Candeland	208	5.8	1.6
Majority		1,706	47.5	
Turnout		3,595	32.5	
Labour hold		Swing		

==== May 2010 ====
2010
Party	Candidate	Votes	%	±%
Labour	Rita Tavernor*	2,701	44.0	−5.5
Liberal Democrats	Tim Hartley	1,768	28.8	+16.1
Conservative	Steven Booth	836	13.6	−16.3
BNP	Tony Trebilcock	765	12.5	+12.5
Green	Mosab Musbahi	74	1.2	−6.7
Majority		933	15.2	−4.4
Turnout		6,144	56.0	+27.4
Labour hold		Swing	-10.8	

=== Elections in 2000s ===
==== April 2009 (by-election) ====
By-election: 9 April 2009
Party	Candidate	Votes	%	±%
Labour	Rita Anne Tavernor	1,353	38.7	−10.8
BNP	Derek George Adams	815	23.3	+23.3
Liberal Democrats	Timothy John Hartley	696	19.9	+7.2
Conservative	Phil Donohue	558	16.0	−13.9
Green	Karl Wardlaw	74	2.1	−5.8
Majority		538	15.4	−4.2
Turnout		2,586	26.1	−1.7
Labour hold		Swing	-17.0	

==== May 2008 ====
2008
Party	Candidate	Votes	%	±%
Labour	Paul Murphy*	1,551	49.5	−6.0
Conservative	Gareth Morris	936	29.9	+9.8
Liberal Democrats	Timothy Hartley	398	12.7	+2.8
Green	Tom Redford	246	7.9	+3.7
Majority		615	19.6	−15.8
Turnout		3,131	28.6	−0.6
Labour hold		Swing	-7.9	

==== May 2007 ====
2007
Party	Candidate	Votes	%	±%
Labour	Henry Cooper*	1,760	55.5	+2.4
Conservative	Tony Pinder	637	20.1	−2.5
UKIP	Peter Reeve	327	10.3	+10.3
Liberal Democrats	Timothy Hartley	314	9.9	−5.3
Green	Robin Goater	132	4.2	−4.8
Majority		1,123	35.4	+4.9
Turnout		3,170	29.2	−2.0
Labour hold		Swing	+2.4	

==== May 2006 ====
2006
Party	Candidate	Votes	%	±%
Labour	Bill Risby*	1,774	53.1	−5.2
Conservative	Anthony Gerard Pinder	755	22.6	−2.7
Liberal Democrats	Timothy John Hartley	506	15.2	+3.1
Green	Rose Ann Cameron	303	9.0	+9.0
Majority		1,019	30.5	−2.6
Turnout		3,338	31.2	−6.1
Labour hold		Swing	-1.2	

==== June 2004 ====
2004 (3 vacancies; new boundaries)
Party	Candidate	Votes	%	±%
Labour	Paul Murphy*	2,210	55.1	
Labour	Henry Cooper*	2,193	54.7	
Labour	Bill Risby*	2,093	52.2	
Conservative	Stuart Kirkwood	957	23.9	
Conservative	Gerald Freedman-Goldberger	753	18.8	
Conservative	Harvey Cochrane	729	18.2	
Liberal Democrats	Celia Carroll	456	11.4	
Liberal Democrats	Catherine Kilday	429	10.7	
Liberal Democrats	Philip Hardman	421	10.5	
Socialist Labour	Kenneth Barr	164	4.1	
Majority		1,136	28.3	
Turnout		4,009	37.4	
Labour win (new seat)				
Labour win (new seat)				
Labour win (new seat)				

==== May 2003 ====
2003
Party	Candidate	Votes	%	±%
Labour	Henry Cooper*	1,366	62.7	−0.3
Conservative	Gerald Freedman-Goldberger	507	23.3	+23.3
Liberal Democrats	Kevin Morley	198	9.1	−15.7
Green	Barry McAtarsney	109	5.0	−2.9
Majority		859	39.4	+1.2
Turnout		2,180	23.1	−1.0
Labour hold		Swing	-11.8	

==== May 2002 ====
2002
Party	Candidate	Votes	%	±%
Labour	Derek Shaw*	1,437	63.0	+3.7
Liberal Democrats	Robert Brettle	566	24.8	−7.9
Green	Barry McAtarsney	180	7.9	+4.9
Socialist Labour	Kenneth Barr	98	4.3	−0.7
Majority		871	38.2	+11.6
Turnout		2,281	24.1	+6.5
Labour hold		Swing	+5.8	

==== May 2000 ====
2000
Party	Candidate	Votes	%	±%
Labour	Patrick Mullins*	1,004	59.3	−9.9
Liberal Democrats	Andrew Appleyard	554	32.7	+16.1
Socialist Labour	Kenneth Barr	85	5.0	+5.0
Green	Barry McAtarsney	50	3.0	+3.0
Majority		450	26.6	−26.0
Turnout		1,693	17.6	−4.3
Labour hold		Swing	-13.0	

=== Elections in 1990s ===
==== May 1999 ====
1999
Party	Candidate	Votes	%	±%
Labour	Henry Cooper*	1,478	69.2	+4.6
Liberal Democrats	Joyce Laslett	355	16.6	−0.3
Conservative	Gregory Skorzewski	304	14.2	−4.2
Majority		1,123	52.6	+6.4
Turnout		2,137	21.9	
Labour hold		Swing	+2.4	

==== May 1998 ====
1998
Party	Candidate	Votes	%	±%
Labour	Derek Shaw*	1,248	64.6	−8.3
Conservative	Gregory Skorzewski	356	18.4	+3.2
Liberal Democrats	Joyce Laslett	327	16.9	+5.8
Majority		892	46.2	−11.5
Turnout		1,931		
Labour hold		Swing	-5.7	

==== May 1996 ====
1996
Party	Candidate	Votes	%	±%
Labour	Patrick Mullin	1,762	72.9	−3.2
Conservative	Gregory Skorzewski	368	15.2	+0.8
Liberal Democrats	Howard Totty	269	11.1	+5.9
Residents	R. Conibere	18	0.7	+0.7
Majority		1,394	57.7	−4.0
Turnout		2,417		
Labour hold		Swing	-2.0	

==== July 1995 (by-election) ====
By-election: 27 July 1995
Party	Candidate	Votes	%	±%
Labour	Patrick Mullin	1,445	69.0	−7.1
Liberal Democrats	Patrick Leech	381	18.2	+9.8
Conservative	Gregory Skorsewski	267	12.7	−1.7
Majority		1,064	50.8	−10.9
Turnout		2,093		
Labour hold		Swing	-8.4	

==== May 1995 ====
1995
Party	Candidate	Votes	%	±%
Labour	Henry Cooper*	2,444	76.1	+5.8
Conservative	Dorothy Keller	463	14.4	−2.0
Liberal Democrats	Vera Towers	270	8.4	−4.9
Independent	J. Bird	33	1.0	+1.0
Majority		1,981	61.7	+7.8
Turnout		3,210		
Labour hold		Swing	+3.9	

==== May 1994 ====
1994
Party	Candidate	Votes	%	±%
Labour	D. Shaw*	2,406	70.3	+19.9
Conservative	J. Bradshaw	562	16.4	−24.9
Liberal Democrats	V. Towers	455	13.3	+5.0
Majority		1,844	53.9	+44.9
Turnout		3,423		
Labour hold		Swing	+22.4	

==== May 1992 ====
1992
Party	Candidate	Votes	%	±%
Labour	M. Enderby	1,546	50.4	+0.5
Conservative	F. Frost	1,269	41.3	+5.6
Liberal Democrats	N. Towers	254	8.3	−6.1
Majority		277	9.0	−5.2
Turnout		3,069		
Labour hold		Swing	-2.5	

==== May 1991 ====
1991
Party	Candidate	Votes	%	±%
Labour	H. Cooper	2,167	49.9	−7.1
Conservative	F. Frost	1,549	35.7	+3.9
Liberal Democrats	E. L. B. Slater	624	14.4	+7.0
Majority		618	14.2	−11.0
Turnout		4,340	43.9	
Labour gain from Conservative		Swing	-5.5	

==== May 1990 ====
1990
Party	Candidate	Votes	%	±%
Labour	D. Shaw	2,752	57.0	+7.0
Conservative	F. Frost	1,535	31.8	−11.0
Liberal Democrats	E. L. B. Slater	356	7.4	+0.2
Green	S. G. Rawlins	182	3.8	+3.8
Majority		1,217	25.2	+18.1
Turnout		4,825		
Labour hold		Swing	+9.0	

=== Elections in 1980s ===
==== May 1988 ====
1988
Party	Candidate	Votes	%	±%
Labour	L. Kelly*	2,368	50.0	+12.9
Conservative	M. Gill	2,031	42.8	−0.4
SLD	E. L. B. Slater	341	7.2	−12.5
Majority		337	7.1	+0.9
Turnout		4,740		
Labour hold		Swing	+6.6	

==== May 1987 ====
1987
Party	Candidate	Votes	%	±%
Conservative	John Clough	2,223	43.2	+17.8
Labour	William Risby*	1,906	37.1	−19.0
Liberal	David Gordon	1,013	19.7	+9.5
Majority		317	6.2	−24.4
Turnout		5,142		
Conservative gain from Labour		Swing	+18.4	

==== May 1986 ====
1986
Party	Candidate	Votes	%	±%
Labour	C. McLaren*	2,584	56.1	+2.5
Conservative	F. Taylor	1,172	25.4	−10.6
Liberal	D. Gordon	471	10.2	+0.2
Majority		1,412	30.6	+13.0
Turnout		4,608		
Labour hold		Swing	+6.5	

==== May 1984 ====
1984
Party	Candidate	Votes	%	±%
Labour	Leonard Kelly	2,471	53.6	+4.0
Conservative	Kenneth Goulding*	1,661	36.0	−3.0
Liberal	Martin Gradwell	476	10.3	−1.0
Majority		810	17.6	+7.0
Turnout		4,608		
Labour gain from Conservative		Swing	+3.5	

==== May 1983 ====
1983
Party	Candidate	Votes	%	±%
Labour	William Risby*	2,621	49.6	+6.5
Conservative	Dave Eager	2,061	39.0	−0.8
Liberal	Martin Gradwell	599	11.3	−5.7
Majority		560	10.6	+7.4
Turnout		5,281		
Labour hold		Swing	+3.6	

==== May 1982 ====
1982 (3 vacancies; new boundaries)
Party	Candidate	Votes	%	±%
Labour	Colin McLaren*	2,220	42.5	
Conservative	Kenneth Goulding	2,054	39.3	
Labour	William Risby	2,024	38.7	
Labour	Leonard Kelly	2,022	38.7	
Conservative	Gwendoline Hurley*	1,904	36.4	
Conservative	Gerald Carey	1,839	35.2	
Liberal	John Bailey	881	16.9	
Liberal	John Gradwell	808	15.5	
Liberal	Martin Gradwell	792	13.9	
Majority		2	0.0	
Turnout		5,228	49.9	
Labour win (new seat)				
Conservative win (new seat)				
Labour win (new seat)				

==== May 1980 ====
1980
Party	Candidate	Votes	%	±%
Labour	D. Shaw	2,788	52.0	+5.7
Conservative	K. E. Goulding*	2,310	43.1	−0.8
Liberal	J. Cookson	265	4.9	−4.9
Majority		478	8.9	+6.4
Turnout		5,363	45.2	−32.0
Labour gain from Conservative		Swing	+3.2	

=== Elections in 1970s ===
==== May 1979 ====
1979
Party	Candidate	Votes	%	±%
Labour	C. McClaren	4,179	46.3	+1.5
Conservative	G. I. Jones*	3,958	43.9	−11.3
Liberal	M. Gradwell	881	9.8	+9.8
Majority		221	2.5	−7.9
Turnout		9,018	77.2	+32.7
Labour gain from Conservative		Swing	+6.4	

==== May 1978 ====
1978
Party	Candidate	Votes	%	±%
Conservative	G. Hurley	2,867	55.2	−6.7
Labour	A. E. Bowden*	2,327	44.8	+6.7
Majority		540	10.4	−13.4
Turnout		5,194	44.5	
Conservative gain from Labour		Swing	-6.7	

==== May 1976 ====
1976
Party	Candidate	Votes	%	±%
Conservative	K. E. Goulding*	3,144	61.9	+5.4
Labour	J. A. Dean	1,935	38.1	+6.0
Majority		1,209	23.8	−0.6
Turnout		5,079		
Conservative hold		Swing	-0.3	

==== May 1975 ====
1975
Party	Candidate	Votes	%	±%
Conservative	G. I. Jones	2,502	56.5	+7.2
Labour	C. C. Lamb*	1,420	32.1	−18.6
Liberal	I. Garrard	356	8.0	+8.0
National Front	M. R. Goucher	149	3.4	+3.4
Majority		1,082	24.4	+23.1
Turnout		4,427		
Conservative gain from Labour		Swing	+12.9	

==== May 1973 ====
1973 (3 vacancies; reorganisation)
Party	Candidate	Votes	%	±%
Labour	A. E. Bowden*	2,266	51.3	+10.9
Conservative	K. E. Goulding*	2,207	50.0	+6.1
Labour	C. C. Lamb	2,123	48.1	+7.7
Labour	W. T. Risby*	2,095	47.4	+7.0
Conservative	A. W. Ash	2,041	46.2	+2.3
Conservative	G. I. Jones	1,909	43.2	−0.7
Majority		82	1.9	
Turnout		4,418		
Labour hold		Swing		
Conservative hold		Swing		
Labour hold		Swing		

==== May 1972 ====
1972
Party	Candidate	Votes	%	±%
Conservative	K. E. Goulding	2,007	43.9	+6.7
Labour	W. Lister*	1,848	40.4	−22.4
Liberal	G. Garrard	661	14.5	+8.9
Communist	A. Clark	57	1.2	−1.4
Majority		159	3.5	
Turnout		4,573		
Conservative gain from Labour		Swing		

==== May 1971 ====
1971 (3 vacancies; new boundaries)
Party	Candidate	Votes	%	±%
Labour	A. E. Bowden*	3,647	62.8	
Labour	W. T. Risby	3,320	57.1	
Labour	W. Lister	3,290	56.6	
Conservative	J. T. Crawford*	2,162	37.2	
Conservative	T. W. R. Bamford	2,083	35.9	
Conservative	K. E. Goulding	1,855	31.9	
Liberal	F. I. Garrard	325	5.6	
Liberal	G. Garrard	311	5.4	
Liberal	P. Witherington	287	4.9	
Communist	G. K. Gray	151	2.6	
Majority		1,128	19.4	
Turnout		5,810		
Labour win (new seat)				
Labour win (new seat)				
Labour win (new seat)				

==== May 1970 ====
1970
Party	Candidate	Votes	%	±%
Labour	A. E. Bowden	2,451	37.9	+6.1
Conservative	T. W. R. Bamford*	2,431	43.7	−21.9
Liberal	J. Lindsay	607	10.9	N/A
Communist	R. Cole	69	1.2	N/A
Residents	G. Nicholls	8	0.1	N/A
Majority		20	0.3	
Turnout		5,566		
Labour gain from Conservative		Swing		

=== Elections in 1960s ===
==== May 1969 ====
1969 (2 vacancies)
Party	Candidate	Votes	%	±%
Conservative	J. T. Crawford	3,006	65.6	−2.8
Conservative	A. Wray*	2,894	63.2	−5.2
Labour	K. Franklin	1,736	37.9	+6.3
Labour	J. E. Jackson	1,527	33.3	+1.7
Majority		1,158	25.3	−11.5
Turnout		4,582		
Conservative hold		Swing		
Conservative hold		Swing		

==== May 1968 ====
1968
Party	Candidate	Votes	%	±%
Conservative	R. H. Hine*	3,099	68.4	+3.5
Labour	G. Halstead	1,432	31.6	−3.5
Majority		1,667	36.8	+7.0
Turnout		4,531		
Conservative hold		Swing		

==== May 1967 ====
1967
Party	Candidate	Votes	%	±%
Conservative	T. W. Bamford	3,293	64.9	+9.7
Labour	G. Halstead*	1,779	35.1	−9.7
Majority		1,514	29.8	+19.4
Turnout		5,072		
Conservative gain from Labour		Swing		

==== May 1966 ====
1966
Party	Candidate	Votes	%	±%
Conservative	A. Wray*	2,644	55.2	+3.7
Labour	J. I. Owen	2,149	44.8	−3.7
Majority		495	10.4	+7.4
Turnout		4,793		
Conservative hold		Swing		

==== May 1965 ====
1965
Party	Candidate	Votes	%	±%
Conservative	R. H. Hine	3,030	51.5	+14.6
Labour	R. Latham*	2,850	48.5	+4.3
Majority		180	3.0	
Turnout		5,880		
Conservative gain from Labour		Swing		

==== December 1964 (by-election) ====
By-election: 10 December 1964
Party	Candidate	Votes	%	±%
Conservative	A. Wray	2,056	48.8	+11.9
Labour	A. Davidson	1,569	37.2	−7.0
Liberal	J. Bulmer	589	14.0	−4.9
Majority		487	11.6	
Turnout		4,214		
Conservative gain from Labour		Swing		

==== May 1964 ====
1964
Party	Candidate	Votes	%	±%
Labour	G. Halstead*	2,419	44.2	−6.6
Conservative	F. Mountfield	2,020	36.9	+10.5
Liberal	J. Bulmer	1,034	18.9	+1.7
Majority		399	7.3	−17.1
Turnout		5,473		
Labour hold		Swing		

==== May 1963 ====
1963
Party	Candidate	Votes	%	±%
Labour	W. R. Barber	3,700	50.8	+4.5
Conservative	P. Collins	1,927	26.4	−6.7
Liberal	J. Bulmer	1,252	17.2	−3.4
Independent	K. E. Goulding	411	5.6	N/A
Majority		1,773	24.4	+11.2
Turnout		7,290		
Labour gain from Conservative		Swing		

==== September 1962 (by-election) ====
By-election: 13 September 1962
Party	Candidate	Votes	%	±%
Labour	G. Halstead	2,367	40.9	−5.4
Conservative	K. E. Goulding	1,966	34.0	+0.9
Liberal	J. Bulmer	1,452	25.1	+4.5
Majority		401	6.9	−6.3
Turnout		5,785		
Labour hold		Swing		

==== May 1962 ====
1962
Party	Candidate	Votes	%	±%
Labour	R. Latham	3,271	46.3	+0.2
Conservative	K. E. Goulding*	2,341	33.1	−4.3
Liberal	J. Bulmer	1,451	20.6	+4.1
Majority		930	13.2	+4.5
Turnout		7,063		
Labour gain from Conservative		Swing		

==== May 1961 ====
1961
Party	Candidate	Votes	%	±%
Labour	C. C. Lamb*	3,390	46.1	+3.9
Conservative	P. Collins	2,748	37.4	−8.3
Liberal	J. Bulmer	1,221	16.5	+4.4
Majority		642	8.7	
Turnout		7,359		
Labour hold		Swing		

==== May 1960 ====
1960
Party	Candidate	Votes	%	±%
Conservative	B. H. Farron	2,993	45.7	+3.7
Labour	R. Latham*	2,765	42.2	+1.0
Liberal	P. L. Marron	796	12.1	−4.7
Majority		228	3.5	+2.7
Turnout		6,554		
Conservative gain from Labour		Swing		

=== Elections in 1950s ===
==== May 1959 ====
1959
Party	Candidate	Votes	%	±%
Conservative	K. E. Goulding	2,990	42.0	−0.2
Labour	W. McGuirk*	2,928	41.2	−16.6
Liberal	P. L. Marron	1,195	16.8	N/A
Majority		62	0.8	
Turnout		7,113		
Conservative gain from Labour		Swing		

==== May 1958 ====
1958
Party	Candidate	Votes	%	±%
Labour	C. C. Lamb*	3,600	57.8	+3.3
Conservative	W. Quick	2,626	42.2	−3.3
Majority		974	15.6	+6.6
Turnout		6,226		
Labour hold		Swing		

==== May 1957 ====
1957
Party	Candidate	Votes	%	±%
Labour	R. Latham*	3,490	54.5	+0.9
Conservative	R. B. Crompton	2,908	45.5	−0.9
Majority		582	9.0	+1.8
Turnout		6,398		
Labour hold		Swing		

==== May 1956 ====
1956
Party	Candidate	Votes	%	±%
Labour	W. M. McGuirk*	3,105	53.6	+0.9
Conservative	M. Dunn	2,684	46.4	−0.9
Majority		421	7.2	+1.8
Turnout		5,789		
Labour hold		Swing		

==== May 1955 ====
1955
Party	Candidate	Votes	%	±%
Labour	C. C. Lamb*	3,703	52.7	−2.6
Conservative	M. Dunn	3,326	47.3	+2.6
Majority		377	5.4	−5.2
Turnout		7,029		
Labour hold		Swing		

==== May 1954 ====
1954
Party	Candidate	Votes	%	±%
Labour	R. Latham	4,075	55.3	+2.2
Conservative	M. Dunn*	3,297	44.7	−2.2
Majority		778	10.6	+4.4
Turnout		7,372		
Labour gain from Conservative		Swing		

==== May 1953 ====
1953
Party	Candidate	Votes	%	±%
Labour	W. M. McGuirk*	4,033	53.1	−7.2
Conservative	W. H. T. Quick	3,560	46.9	+7.2
Majority		473	6.2	−14.4
Turnout		7,603		
Labour hold		Swing		

==== May 1952 ====
1952
Party	Candidate	Votes	%	±%
Labour	C. C. Lamb*	5,428	60.3	+13.3
Conservative	F. Kay	3,575	39.7	−13.3
Majority		1,853	20.6	
Turnout		9,003		
Labour hold		Swing		

==== May 1951 ====
1951
Party	Candidate	Votes	%	±%
Conservative	M. Dunn*	3,970	53.0	+6.4
Labour	R. Latham	3,519	47.0	−6.4
Majority		451	6.0	
Turnout		7,489		
Conservative hold		Swing		

==== May 1950 ====
1950 (new boundaries)
Party	Candidate	Votes	%	±%
Labour	W. M. McGuirk*	3,855	53.3	
Conservative	F. E. Doran	3,378	46.7	
Majority		477	6.6	
Turnout		7,233		
Labour hold		Swing		

=== Elections in 1940s ===
==== May 1949 ====
1949
Party	Candidate	Votes	%	±%
Labour	C. C. Lamb*	6,376	49.7	+6.2
Conservative	W. C. Carruthers	6,206	48.4	−0.5
Communist	C. Dalton	240	1.9	N/A
Majority		170	1.3	
Turnout		12,822		
Labour hold		Swing		

==== November 1947 ====
1947
Party	Candidate	Votes	%	±%
Conservative	M. Dunn*	6,414	48.9	+7.8
Labour	R. J. Latham	5,713	43.5	−6.7
Liberal	J. H. Cully	1,001	7.6	−1.2
Majority		701	5.4	−3.7
Turnout		13,128		
Conservative hold		Swing		

==== January 1947 (by-election) ====
By-election: 23 January 1947
Party	Candidate	Votes	%	±%
Conservative	M. Dunn	3,820	50.1	+9.0
Labour	A. Barnacott	3,165	41.5	−8.7
Liberal	H. Kevin Armitage	638	8.4	−0.4
Majority		655	8.6	
Turnout		7,623		
Conservative gain from Labour		Swing		

==== November 1946 ====
1946
Party	Candidate	Votes	%	±%
Labour	W. Onions*	4,613	50.2	−8.3
Conservative	M. Dunn	3,777	41.1	+14.0
Liberal	H. Kevin Armitage	805	8.8	−5.6
Majority		836	9.1	−22.4
Turnout		9,195		
Labour hold		Swing		

==== November 1945 ====
1945
Party	Candidate	Votes	%	±%
Labour	C. C. Lamb	5,225	58.5	+4.9
Conservative	H. F. Johnston*	2,417	27.1	−19.3
Liberal	H. Kevin Armitage	1,285	14.4	N/A
Majority		2,808	31.5	+24.3
Turnout		8,927	42.1	
Labour gain from Conservative		Swing		

=== Elections in 1930s ===
==== November 1938 ====
1938
Party	Candidate	Votes	%	±%
Labour	F. Gregson*	3,315	53.6	N/A
Conservative	W. Hadfield	2,871	46.4	N/A
Majority		444	7.2	N/A
Turnout		6,186		
Labour hold		Swing		

==== November 1937 ====
1937
Party	Candidate	Votes	%	±%
Labour	W. Onions*	uncontested		
Labour hold		Swing		

==== November 1936 ====
1936
Party	Candidate	Votes	%	±%
Conservative	F. Farrington*	3,754	52.2	+5.0
Labour	S. D. Simon	3,433	47.8	−5.0
Majority		321	4.4	
Turnout		7,187		
Conservative hold		Swing		

==== November 1935 ====
1935
Party	Candidate	Votes	%	±%
Labour	F. Gregson*	3,198	52.8	−1.3
Conservative	W. Beck	2,863	47.2	+1.3
Majority		335	5.6	−2.6
Turnout		6,061		
Labour hold		Swing		

==== November 1934 ====
1934
Party	Candidate	Votes	%	±%
Labour	W. Onions*	2,879	54.1	+6.8
Conservative	A. C. Cox	2,439	45.9	−6.8
Majority		440	8.2	
Turnout		5,318		
Labour hold		Swing		

==== March 1934 (by-election) ====
By-election: 20 March 1934
Party	Candidate	Votes	%	±%
Labour	W. Onions	2,431	54.2	+6.9
Conservative	W. P. Parker	2,053	45.8	−6.9
Majority		378	8.4	
Turnout		4,484		
Labour hold		Swing		

==== November 1933 ====
1933
Party	Candidate	Votes	%	±%
Conservative	F. Farrington*	3,001	52.7	+6.8
Labour	W. Onions	2,694	47.3	−6.8
Majority		307	5.4	
Turnout		5,695		
Conservative hold		Swing		

==== November 1932 ====
1932
Party	Candidate	Votes	%	±%
Labour	F. Gregson*	2,981	54.1	+2.5
Conservative	W. P. Parker	2,532	45.9	−2.5
Majority		449	8.2	+5.0
Turnout		5,513		
Labour hold		Swing		

==== November 1931 ====
1931
Party	Candidate	Votes	%	±%
Labour	W. R. Mellor*	3,075	51.6	+18.2
Conservative	J. S. O'Byrne	2,887	48.4	−6.2
Majority		188	3.2	
Turnout		5,962	51.2	
Labour hold		Swing		

==== November 1930 ====
1930
Party	Candidate	Votes	%	±%
Conservative	F. Farrington*	3,072	54.6	+22.6
Labour	G. S. Dixon	1,881	33.4	−15.1
Liberal	B. Adler	671	11.9	−7.6
Majority		1,191	21.2	
Turnout		5,624		
Conservative hold		Swing		

=== Elections in 1920s ===
==== November 1929 ====
1929
Party	Candidate	Votes	%	±%
Labour	F. Gregson	2,369	48.5	−7.7
Conservative	M. McRay	1,563	32.0	−11.3
Liberal	B. Adler	955	19.5	N/A
Majority		806	16.5	+3.6
Turnout		4,887	43.8	−14.6
Labour hold		Swing		

==== November 1928 ====
1928
Party	Candidate	Votes	%	±%
Labour	W. R. Mellor*	3,325	56.2	+21.1
Conservative	C. Roberts	2,561	43.3	+7.6
Residents	E. Walker	34	0.6	N/A
Majority		764	12.9	
Turnout		5,920	58.4	−4.4
Labour hold		Swing		

==== November 1927 ====
1927
Party	Candidate	Votes	%	±%
Conservative	F. Farrington	2,057	35.7	−12.6
Labour	F. Gregson	2,023	35.1	−16.6
Liberal	G. G. Wellings*	1,684	29.2	N/A
Majority		34	0.6	
Turnout		5,764	62.8	+1.8
Conservative gain from Liberal		Swing		

==== November 1926 ====
1926
Party	Candidate	Votes	%	±%
Labour	M. Welch*	2,795	51.7	−6.9
Conservative	F. Farrington	2,609	48.3	N/A
Majority		186	3.4	−13.8
Turnout		5,404	61.0	+2.6
Labour hold		Swing		

==== November 1925 ====
1925
Party	Candidate	Votes	%	±%
Labour	W. R. Mellor*	3,028	58.6	+11.7
Liberal	A. Forsyth	2,140	41.4	+22.6
Majority		888	17.2	+4.6
Turnout		5,168	58.4	
Labour hold		Swing		

==== November 1924 ====
1924
Party	Candidate	Votes	%	±%
Labour	G. G. Wellings	2,791	46.9	+2.3
Conservative	P. Alberti	2,041	34.3	−4.2
Liberal	G. Ward	1,122	18.8	+1.9
Majority		750	12.6	+6.5
Turnout		5,954		
Labour gain from Conservative		Swing		

==== November 1923 ====
1923
Party	Candidate	Votes	%	±%
Labour	M. Welsh	2,292	44.6	−17.5
Conservative	J. Bostock*	1,980	38.5	N/A
Liberal	W. Turner	867	16.9	−21.0
Majority		312	6.1	−18.1
Turnout		5,139		
Labour gain from Conservative		Swing		

==== November 1922 ====
1922
Party	Candidate	Votes	%	±%
Labour	W. R. Mellor*	2,868	62.1	+17.1
Liberal	W. Webster	1,754	37.9	N/A
Majority		1,114	24.2	
Turnout		4,622	53.2	−3.2
Labour hold		Swing		

==== November 1921 ====
1921
Party	Candidate	Votes	%	±%
Conservative	B. Frankland	2,676	55.0	+2.4
Labour	F. Gregson*	2,188	45.0	N/A
Majority		488	10.0	+4.8
Turnout		5,864	56.4	+16.8
Conservative gain from Labour		Swing		

==== November 1920 ====
1920
Party	Candidate	Votes	%	±%
Conservative	J. Bostock	2,039	52.6	+19.2
Co-operative Party	T. Horrocks*	1,835	47.4	+3.4
Majority		204	5.2	
Turnout		3,874	38.6	−0.4
Conservative gain from Co-operative Party		Swing		

=== Elections in 1910s ===
==== November 1919 ====
1919 (3 vacancies)
Party	Candidate	Votes	%	±%
Labour	W. R. Mellor*	2,714	80.9	
Labour	F. Gregson	2,233	66.6	
Co-operative Party	T. Horrocks	1,475	44.0	
Conservative	J. Bostock	1,122	33.4	
Liberal	G. Ward	1,027	30.6	
Conservative	E. Eady	812	24.2	
Liberal	H. Case	678	20.2	
Majority		353	10.5	
Turnout		3,354	39.0	
Labour win (new seat)				
Labour win (new seat)				
Co-operative Party win (new seat)				

== See also ==
- Manchester City Council
- Manchester City Council elections
