= 1988 Manchester City Council election =

1988 UK local government election

- 5 May 1988

38 of 99 seats to Manchester City Council 50 seats needed for a majority
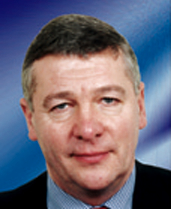
	First party	Second party	Third party
Leader	Graham Stringer	Joyce Hill	Keith Whitmore
Party	Labour	Conservative	SLD
Leader's seat	Harpurhey	Didsbury	Levenshulme
Last election	19 seats, 42.0%	9 seats, 29.0%	5 seats, 27.1%
Seats before	75	14	10
Seats won	34	2	2
Seats after	77	13	9
Seat change	▲2	▼1	▼1
Popular vote	71,493	38,089	20,480
Percentage	53.1%	28.3%	15.2%
Swing	▲11.1%	▼0.7%	▼11.9%
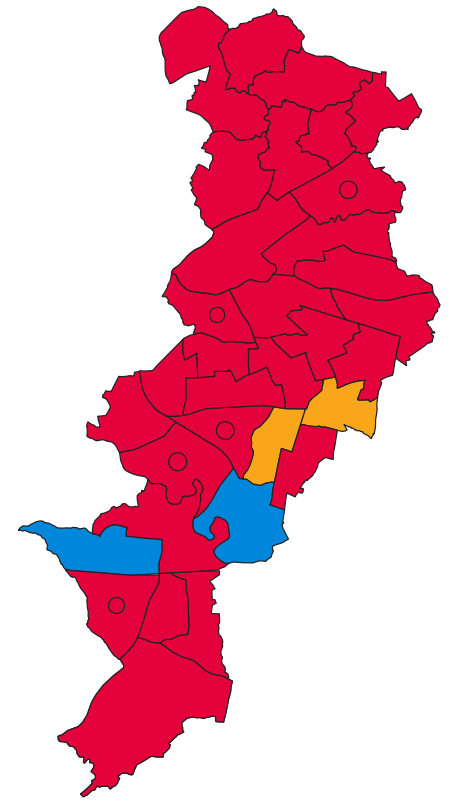
- Map of results of 1988 election
Leader of the Council before election
Graham Stringer
Labour
Leader of the Council after election
Graham Stringer
Labour

Elections to Manchester City Council were held on Thursday, 5 May 1988. One third of the council was up for election, with each successful candidate to serve a four-year term of office, expiring in 1992. The Labour Party retained overall control of the Council.

== Election result ==
Party	Votes		Seats			Full Council	
Labour Party	71,493 (53.1%)	▲11.1	34 (89.5%)	34 / 38	▲2	77 (77.7%)	77 / 99
Conservative Party	38,089 (28.3%)	▼0.7	2 (5.3%)	2 / 38	▼1	13 (13.1%)	13 / 99
SLD	20,480 (15.2%)	▼11.9	2 (5.3%)	2 / 38	▼1	9 (9.1%)	9 / 99
Green Party	2,867 (2.1%)	▲0.9	0 (0.0%)	0 / 38	Steady	0 (0.0%)	0 / 99
SDP	1,160 (0.8%)	N/A	0 (0.0%)	0 / 38	N/A	0 (0.0%)	0 / 99
Independent	482 (0.3%)	▼0.2	0 (0.0%)	0 / 38	Steady	0 (0.0%)	0 / 99
Communist	139 (0.1%)	N/A	0 (0.0%)	0 / 38	N/A	0 (0.0%)	0 / 99

↓
78	9	12

== Ward results ==
=== Ardwick ===
Ardwick
Party	Candidate	Votes	%	±%
Labour	E. H. Hopkins	1,999	78.8	+11.8
Conservative	M. D. Payne	309	12.2	−3.9
SLD	K. V. Read	155	6.1	−10.8
Green	J. A. B. Hall	74	2.9	+2.9
Majority		1,690	66.6	+16.5
Turnout		2,537		
Labour hold		Swing	+7.8	

=== Baguley ===
Baguley (2 vacancies)
Party	Candidate	Votes	%	±%
Labour	A. Burns*	2,372	57.6	+15.5
Labour	J. McNicholls	2,207		
Conservative	V. C. Kirby	1,443	35.1	+0.5
Conservative	S. W. Lawley	1,414		
SLD	G. Hall	300	7.3	−16.0
SLD	L. H. McLoughlin	246		
Majority		764	22.5	+15.0
Turnout		4,115		
Labour hold		Swing		
Labour hold		Swing	+7.5	

=== Barlow Moor ===
Barlow Moor (2 vacancies)
Party	Candidate	Votes	%	±%
Labour	Y. A. Gooljary	1,746	37.3	+2.5
Labour	I. M. Summers	1,594		
SLD	R. S. Harrison	1,309	28.0	−14.5
SLD	H. D. McKay	1,286		
Conservative	N. H. Brook	1,284	27.5	+7.0
Conservative	M. B. Beaugeard	1,229		
Green	B. A. Candeland	334	7.1	+4.8
Majority		285	9.3	+1.6
Turnout		4,673		
Labour hold		Swing		
Labour hold		Swing	+8.5	

=== Benchill ===
Benchill
Party	Candidate	Votes	%	±%
Labour	V. M. Myers*	1,735	60.0	−2.6
Independent	D. A. Morris	482	16.7	+16.7
SLD	A. Bradshaw	407	14.1	−23.3
Conservative	W. F. Hurst	267	9.2	+9.2
Majority		1,253	43.3	+18.1
Turnout		2,891		
Labour hold		Swing	-9.6	

=== Beswick and Clayton ===
Beswick and Clayton
Party	Candidate	Votes	%	±%
Labour	J. Flanagan*	2,157	75.0	+18.8
Conservative	B. H. Brooks	548	19.1	−7.5
SLD	V. M. Cahill	171	5.9	−11.3
Majority		1,253	43.6	+14.1
Turnout		2,876		
Labour hold		Swing	+13.1	

=== Blackley ===
Blackley
Party	Candidate	Votes	%	±%
Labour	K. Barnes	2,290	61.1	+15.9
Conservative	F. J. R. Lomas	1,117	29.8	−3.1
SLD	J. Cookson	340	9.1	−12.8
Majority		1,173	31.3	+19.0
Turnout		3,747		
Labour hold		Swing	+9.5	

=== Bradford ===
Bradford
Party	Candidate	Votes	%	±%
Labour	K. J. Rowswell	2,008	72.8	+10.9
Conservative	K. Hyde	531	19.2	+0.8
SLD	P. F. Allanson	220	8.0	−11.6
Majority		1,477	53.5	+11.2
Turnout		2,759		
Labour hold		Swing	+5.0	

=== Brooklands ===
Brooklands
Party	Candidate	Votes	%	±%
Conservative	P. Cummins	2,316	50.6	+0.6
Labour	J. Broderick*	1,934	42.3	+9.9
SLD	D. Wraxall	325	7.1	−10.6
Majority		382	8.3	−9.3
Turnout		4,575		
Conservative gain from Labour		Swing	-4.6	

=== Burnage ===
Burnage
Party	Candidate	Votes	%	±%
Labour	J. Clegg*	2,546	49.7	+13.8
Conservative	A. Riley	2,001	39.0	−1.2
SLD	R. Taylor	483	9.4	−12.8
Green	E. F. Howard	96	1.9	+0.3
Majority		545	10.6	
Turnout		5,126		
Labour hold		Swing	+7.5	

=== Central ===
Central
Party	Candidate	Votes	%	±%
Labour	G. Conquest*	1,551	80.6	+12.7
Conservative	A. E. W. Hudson	255	13.3	−3.1
SLD	C. Muir	118	6.1	−9.7
Majority		1,296	67.4	+15.9
Turnout		1,924		
Labour hold		Swing	+7.9	

=== Charlestown ===
Charlestown
Party	Candidate	Votes	%	±%
Labour	B. Curley	2,289	57.4	+16.2
Conservative	M. Harris	1,368	34.3	−3.4
SDP	S. Earnshaw	182	4.6	+4.6
SLD	N. Towers	148	3.7	−17.4
Majority		921	23.1	+19.5
Turnout		3,987		
Labour hold		Swing	+9.8	

=== Cheetham ===
Cheetham
Party	Candidate	Votes	%	±%
Labour	J. McCardell*	2,484	78.1	+25.8
Conservative	R. T. L. Berg	453	14.2	+14.2
SLD	S. A. Lewis	245	7.7	−13.8
Majority		2,031	63.8	+37.7
Turnout		3,182		
Labour hold		Swing	+5.8	

=== Chorlton ===
Chorlton
Party	Candidate	Votes	%	±%
Labour	A. Tomlinson	2,693	43.5	+10.7
Conservative	E. Walker*	2,655	42.9	−1.5
SLD	R. T. Bogg	467	7.6	−12.2
Green	D. Glazier	231	3.7	+0.6
Communist	M. Waterfield	139	2.2	+2.2
Majority		38	0.6	−11.0
Turnout		6,185		
Labour gain from Conservative		Swing	+6.1	

=== Crumpsall ===
Crumpsall
Party	Candidate	Votes	%	±%
Labour	R. Leese*	2,014	47.6	+11.1
Conservative	A. E. Walsh	1,942	45.9	+0.8
SLD	J. A. Smith	276	6.5	−9.6
Majority		72	1.7	−6.9
Turnout		4,232		
Labour hold		Swing	+5.1	

=== Didsbury ===
Didsbury
Party	Candidate	Votes	%	±%
Conservative	P. Hilton	3,139	53.9	−0.4
Labour	G. Bridson	1,802	31.0	+8.7
SLD	E. Allen	688	11.8	−8.3
Green	G. Otten	191	3.3	−0.0
Majority		1,337	23.0	−8.9
Turnout		5,820		
Conservative hold		Swing	-4.5	

=== Fallowfield ===
Fallowfield
Party	Candidate	Votes	%	±%
Labour	R. A. Graham*	2,054	51.0	+9.1
Conservative	S. W. Keegin	1,170	29.0	−6.0
SLD	E. A. Cross	622	15.4	−3.8
Green	J. Sturrock	184	4.6	+0.7
Majority		884	21.9	+14.9
Turnout		4,030		
Labour hold		Swing	+7.5	

=== Gorton North ===
Gorton North
Party	Candidate	Votes	%	±%
Labour	T. Hamnett*	2,226	46.3	+0.9
SLD	J. Pearcey	1,948	40.5	+12.2
Conservative	N. Dentith	638	13.3	−13.0
Majority		278	5.8	−11.3
Turnout		4,812		
Labour hold		Swing	-5.6	

=== Gorton South ===
Gorton South
Party	Candidate	Votes	%	±%
Labour	B. Stone	2,170	48.9	+10.0
SLD	J. Bridges*	1,871	42.2	−6.9
Conservative	T. A. Grimshaw	394	8.9	−3.0
Majority		299	6.7	−3.5
Turnout		4,435		
Labour gain from SLD		Swing	+8.4	

=== Harpurhey ===
Harpurhey
Party	Candidate	Votes	%	±%
Labour	G. Stringer*	2,493	69.1	+22.1
Conservative	R. Chadwick	851	23.6	−6.6
SLD	V. Towers	264	7.3	−15.4
Majority		1,642	45.5	+28.7
Turnout		3,608		
Labour hold		Swing	+14.3	

=== Hulme ===
Hulme (2 vacancies)
Party	Candidate	Votes	%	±%
Labour	V. Dunn*	1,775	70.9	−1.9
Labour	H. Johnson	1,639		
Green	P. E. Harrison	395	15.8	+15.8
Conservative	A. Pollitt	171	6.8	+6.8
SLD	S. M. Jones	161	6.4	−20.8
Conservative	D. M. Powell	160		
SLD	C. Whettam	107		
Majority		1,244	55.1	+9.5
Turnout		2,502		
Labour hold		Swing		
Labour hold		Swing	-8.8	

=== Levenshulme ===
Levenshulme
Party	Candidate	Votes	%	±%
SLD	J. Commons	2,038	41.2	−14.2
Labour	D. J. Power	1,821	36.8	+9.3
Conservative	R. Colledge	919	18.6	+4.8
Green	A. R. King	172	3.5	+0.2
Majority		217	4.4	−23.5
Turnout		4,950		
SLD hold		Swing	-11.7	

=== Lightbowne ===
Lightbowne
Party	Candidate	Votes	%	±%
Labour	W. Risby	2,497	50.8	+15.6
Conservative	J. A. Smeaton	1,882	38.3	−0.3
SLD	D. Porter	464	9.4	−16.9
Green	R. Wallace	72	1.5	+1.5
Majority		615	12.5	+9.1
Turnout		4,915		
Labour hold		Swing	+7.9	

=== Longsight ===
Longsight
Party	Candidate	Votes	%	±%
Labour	K. Robinson*	2,801	68.3	+8.2
Conservative	D. Ferguson	571	13.9	−3.7
SLD	L. M. Moulding	520	12.7	−6.5
Green	L. A. King	207	5.1	+1.9
Majority		2,230	54.4	+13.5
Turnout		4,099		
Labour hold		Swing	+5.9	

=== Moss Side ===
Moss Side
Party	Candidate	Votes	%	±%
Labour	V. P. Young	2,438	75.4	+5.3
Conservative	M. Barnes	482	14.9	−1.1
SLD	F. Griffiths	200	6.2	−7.7
Green	D. A. Howarth	112	3.5	+3.5
Majority		1,956	60.5	+6.4
Turnout		3,232		
Labour hold		Swing	+3.2	

=== Moston ===
Moston
Party	Candidate	Votes	%	±%
Labour	L. Kelly*	2,368	50.0	+12.9
Conservative	M. Gill	2,031	42.8	−0.4
SLD	E. L. B. Slater	341	7.2	−12.5
Majority		337	7.1	+0.9
Turnout		4,740		
Labour hold		Swing	+6.6	

=== Newton Heath ===
Newton Heath (2 vacancies)
Party	Candidate	Votes	%	±%
Labour	J. Smith*	2,197	74.0	+17.8
Labour	A. F. Garside	2,133		
Conservative	R. J. Merrin	585	19.7	−4.6
Conservative	S. W. Place	538		
SLD	G. Shaw	186	6.3	−13.2
SLD	J. A. Snellwood	177		
Majority		1,548	54.3	+22.4
Turnout		2,968		
Labour hold		Swing		
Labour hold		Swing	+11.2	

=== Northenden ===
Northenden
Party	Candidate	Votes	%	±%
Labour	H. Brown*	2,175	49.7	+18.4
Conservative	R. Bee	1,792	41.0	+4.0
SLD	R. K. Higginson	354	8.1	−22.5
Green	C. P. Ireland	54	1.2	+0.1
Majority		383	8.8	+3.1
Turnout		4,375		
Labour hold		Swing	+7.2	

=== Old Moat ===
Old Moat (2 vacancies)
Party	Candidate	Votes	%	±%
Labour	B. Harrison*	2,793	44.9	+6.9
Labour	A. Spencer	2,570		
SLD	P. A. Monkhouse	1,428	22.9	−12.0
Conservative	J. F. Roberts	1,346	21.6	−3.4
Conservative	N. M. Watson	1,203		
SLD	M. E. D. Boyle	1,058		
SDP	B. Gaskin	332	5.3	+5.3
Green	S. J. Buchan	321	5.1	+3.0
Majority		1,142	22.0	+18.9
Turnout		6,220		
Labour hold		Swing		
Labour hold		Swing	+9.4	

=== Rusholme ===
Rusholme
Party	Candidate	Votes	%	±%
Labour	Y. Mambu	1,876	43.8	+4.6
SLD	A. Choudhury	1,512	35.3	−10.7
Conservative	N. F. Barnes	652	15.2	+3.4
Green	B. S. Bingham	245	5.7	+2.7
Majority		364	8.5	+1.7
Turnout		4,285		
Labour hold		Swing	+7.6	

=== Sharston ===
Sharston
Party	Candidate	Votes	%	±%
Labour	G. Berry	2,051	52.8	+14.3
Conservative	A. R. Williams	1,119	28.8	+1.2
SLD	R. Bowers	717	18.4	−15.5
Majority		932	24.0	+19.4
Turnout		3,887		
Labour hold		Swing	+6.5	

=== Whalley Range ===
Whalley Range
Party	Candidate	Votes	%	±%
Labour	K. M. Fry	2,285	47.3	+8.7
Conservative	V. M. Colledge	1,948	40.3	−2.4
SLD	P. J. Davis	270	5.6	−10.3
Green	C. I. Kirby	179	3.7	+0.9
SDP	K. McKeon	151	3.1	+3.1
Majority		337	7.0	+2.9
Turnout		4,833		
Labour gain from Conservative		Swing	+5.5	

=== Withington ===
Withington
Party	Candidate	Votes	%	±%
SLD	A. Firth*	1,932	39.4	−5.5
Labour	A. D. R. Eko	1,561	31.9	+4.4
Conservative	A. J. Elleray	1,405	28.7	+3.9
Majority		371	7.6	−9.7
Turnout		4,898		
SLD hold		Swing	-4.9	

=== Woodhouse Park ===
Woodhouse Park
Party	Candidate	Votes	%	±%
Labour	R. H. Vaughan	2,292	69.6	+21.6
Conservative	D. M. Hurst	505	15.3	−5.3
SDP	E. M. Bowers	495	15.0	+15.0
Majority		1,787	54.3	+37.6
Turnout		3,292		
Labour hold		Swing	+13.4	

== By-elections between 1988 and 1990 ==
=== Northenden, 15 September 1988 ===
Caused by the resignation of Councillor Bernard Slamon (Conservative, Northenden, elected 20 August 1987) on 5 August 1988.

Northenden
Party	Candidate	Votes	%	±%
Labour	G. Carroll	1,794	49.6	−0.1
Conservative	J. Robertson	1,603	44.3	+3.3
SLD	R. K. Higginson	223	6.1	−2.0
Majority		191	5.3	−3.5
Turnout		3,620		
Labour gain from Conservative		Swing		

=== Brooklands, 16 March 1989 ===
Caused by the death of Councillor Arthur O'Connor (Conservative, Brooklands, elected 7 May 1987; previously 1967-70, 1973-79, and 1982-84) on 13 November 1988.

Brooklands
Party	Candidate	Votes	%	±%
Conservative	M. B. Beaugeard	1,703	42.5	−8.1
Labour	G. Collier	1,297	32.4	−9.9
SLD	S. Lawley	1,008	25.1	+18.0
Majority		406	10.1	+1.8
Turnout		4,008		
Conservative hold		Swing		
