= 1967 Manchester City Council election =

UK local government election

- 11 May 1967

38 of 152 seats to Manchester City Council 77 seats needed for a majority
	First party	Second party	Third party
Party	Conservative	Labour	Liberal
Last election	18 seats, 48.3%	20 seats, 45.1%	0 seats, 5.4%
Seats before	64	86	2
Seats won	27	11	0
Seats after	78	73	1
Seat change	▲14	▼13	▼1
Popular vote	69,024	40,736	6,792
Percentage	58.3%	34.4%	5.7%
Swing	▲10.0%	▼10.7%	▲0.3%
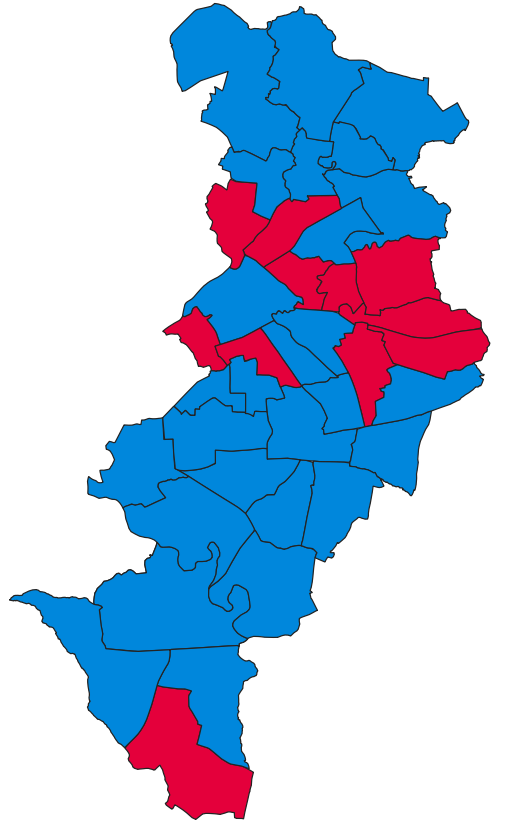
- Map of results of 1967 election
Leader of the Council before election
Labour
Leader of the Council after election
Conservative

Elections to Manchester City Council were held on Thursday, 11 May 1967. One third of the councillors seats were up for election, with each successful candidate to serve a three-year term of office. The Conservative Party gained overall control of the council from the Labour Party.

== Election result ==
Party	Votes	Seats		Full Council			
Conservative Party	69,024 (58.3%)	▲10.0	27 (71.1%)	27 / 38	▲14	78 (51.3%)	78 / 152
Labour Party	40,736 (34.4%)	▼10.7	11 (28.9%)	11 / 38	▼13	73 (48.0%)	73 / 152
Liberal Party	6,792 (5.7%)	▲0.3	0 (0.0%)	0 / 38	▼1	1 (0.7%)	1 / 152
Communist	987 (0.8%)	▼0.2	0 (0.0%)	0 / 38	Steady	0 (0.0%)	0 / 152
Independent	626 (0.5%)	▲0.2	0 (0.0%)	0 / 38	Steady	0 (0.0%)	0 / 152
Union Movement	140 (0.1%)	N/A	0 (0.0%)	0 / 38	N/A	0 (0.0%)	0 / 152
Independent Labour	14 (0.0%)	N/A	0 (0.0%)	0 / 38	N/A	0 (0.0%)	0 / 152

=== Full council ===
↓
73	1	78

=== Aldermen ===
↓
22	1	15

=== Councillors ===
↓
51	63

== Ward results ==
=== Alexandra Park ===
Alexandra Park
Party	Candidate	Votes	%	±%
Conservative	L. Bailey*	2,937	66.5	+4.8
Liberal	E. O. Tomlinson	955	21.6	−2.6
Labour	K. McKeon	526	11.9	−2.2
Majority		1,982	44.9	+7.4
Turnout		4,418		
Conservative hold		Swing		

=== All Saints' ===
All Saints'
Party	Candidate	Votes	%	±%
Labour	T. Thomas*	304	53.3	−15.2
Conservative	F. Hewerdine	266	46.7	+15.2
Majority		38	6.6	−30.4
Turnout		570		
Labour hold		Swing		

=== Ardwick ===
Ardwick
Party	Candidate	Votes	%	±%
Conservative	D. Taylor	570	53.4	−5.9
Labour	F. Taylor*	498	46.6	+5.9
Majority		72	6.8	−11.8
Turnout		1,068		
Conservative gain from Labour		Swing		

=== Baguley ===
Baguley
Party	Candidate	Votes	%	±%
Conservative	T. E. Murphy	3,456	59.7	+12.1
Labour	H. Lloyd*	2,334	40.3	−12.1
Majority		1,122	19.4	
Turnout		5,790		
Conservative gain from Labour		Swing		

=== Barlow Moor ===
Barlow Moor
Party	Candidate	Votes	%	±%
Conservative	C. M. Pugh	1,921	55.9	−8.5
Liberal	P. Jones*	975	28.4	N/A
Labour	R. Barrett	539	15.7	−19.9
Majority		946	27.5	−1.3
Turnout		3,435		
Conservative gain from Liberal		Swing		

=== Benchill ===
Benchill
Party	Candidate	Votes	%	±%
Conservative	A. A. O'Connor	2,839	58.4	+8.0
Labour	H. Brown*	1,933	39.7	−7.6
Communist	M. Taylor	93	1.9	−0.4
Majority		906	18.7	+15.6
Turnout		4,865		
Conservative gain from Labour		Swing		

=== Beswick ===
Beswick
Party	Candidate	Votes	%	±%
Labour	J. Dean*	1,031	63.6	−16.8
Conservative	R. Lilley	370	22.8	+3.2
Independent	E. Bevan	219	13.6	N/A
Majority		661	40.8	−20.0
Turnout		1,620		
Labour hold		Swing		

=== Blackley ===
Blackley
Party	Candidate	Votes	%	±%
Conservative	W. Burrows*	2,825	69.0	+13.2
Labour	A. E. Halliday	803	19.6	−22.1
Liberal	J. M. Ashley	395	9.6	N/A
Communist	I. W. Luft	73	1.8	−0.7
Majority		2,022	49.4	+35.3
Turnout		4,096		
Conservative hold		Swing		

=== Bradford ===
Bradford
Party	Candidate	Votes	%	±%
Labour	R. Massey*	1,440	48.7	−20.0
Conservative	D. F. Silverman	1,418	47.9	+19.3
Communist	D. Maher	100	3.4	+0.7
Majority		22	0.8	−39.3
Turnout		2,958		
Labour hold		Swing		

=== Burnage ===
Burnage
Party	Candidate	Votes	%	±%
Conservative	B. J. Cox*	2,899	67.5	+7.4
Labour	J. F. Lilley	1,035	24.1	−15.8
Liberal	S. B. Downs	359	8.4	N/A
Majority		1,864	43.4	+23.2
Turnout		4,293		
Conservative hold		Swing		

=== Cheetham ===
Cheetham
Party	Candidate	Votes	%	±%
Conservative	F. E. Meaden	1,114	54.2	+27.0
Labour	R. E. Talbot	827	40.2	−8.6
Communist	H. Ogden	115	5.6	+2.5
Majority		287	14.0	
Turnout		2,056		
Conservative gain from Labour		Swing		

=== Chorlton-cum-Hardy ===
Chorlton-cum-Hardy
Party	Candidate	Votes	%	±%
Conservative	L. Sanders*	3,248	71.4	+8.4
Labour	S. V. Shaw	750	16.5	−4.2
Liberal	F. E. Hartley	548	12.1	−4.2
Majority		2,498	54.9	+12.6
Turnout		4,546		
Conservative hold		Swing		

=== Collegiate Church ===
Collegiate Church
Party	Candidate	Votes	%	±%
Labour	J. Davis*	681	64.5	−5.4
Conservative	A. R. Gallagher	280	26.5	+10.1
Communist	M. Jones	95	9.0	−4.7
Majority		401	38.0	−15.5
Turnout		1,056		
Labour hold		Swing		

=== Crumpsall ===
Crumpsall
Party	Candidate	Votes	%	±%
Conservative	J. Yates	3,480	54.5	+2.0
Labour	F. J. Balcombe*	2,900	45.5	−2.0
Majority		580	9.0	+4.0
Turnout		6,380		
Conservative gain from Labour		Swing		

=== Didsbury ===
Didsbury
Party	Candidate	Votes	%	±%
Conservative	M. R. Crawford*	3,735	84.0	+4.4
Labour	M. Jowett	710	16.0	−4.4
Majority		3,025	68.0	+8.8
Turnout		4,445		
Conservative hold		Swing		

=== Gorton North ===
Gorton North
Party	Candidate	Votes	%	±%
Labour	N. Leech*	1,824	46.7	−16.8
Conservative	H. V. J. Straker	1,661	42.5	+9.4
Liberal	K. L. Steventon	295	7.5	N/A
Communist	B. J. Bush	129	3.3	+0.1
Majority		163	4.2	−26.0
Turnout		3,909		
Labour hold		Swing		

=== Gorton South ===
Gorton South
Party	Candidate	Votes	%	±%
Conservative	D. E. Lindsey	1,702	54.5	+18.1
Labour	H. J. Batson*	1,422	45.5	−18.1
Majority		280	9.0	
Turnout		3,124		
Conservative gain from Labour		Swing		

=== Harpurhey ===
Harpurhey
Party	Candidate	Votes	%	±%
Conservative	K. Allday	1,578	54.5	+10.4
Labour	H. Waddicor*	1,318	45.5	−10.4
Majority		260	9.0	
Turnout		2,896		
Conservative gain from Labour		Swing		

=== Hugh Oldham ===
Hugh Oldham
Party	Candidate	Votes	%	±%
Labour	A. Nicholson*	483	58.9	−18.4
Conservative	A. J. Walker	337	41.1	+18.4
Majority		146	17.8	−36.8
Turnout		820		
Labour hold		Swing		

=== Levenshulme ===
Levenshulme
Party	Candidate	Votes	%	±%
Conservative	A. Williamson*	2,621	74.7	+12.8
Labour	H. N. Ebrey	889	25.3	−12.8
Majority		1,732	49.4	+25.6
Turnout		3,510		
Conservative hold		Swing		

=== Lightbowne ===
Lightbowne
Party	Candidate	Votes	%	±%
Conservative	N. A. Green	2,396	46.5	+6.3
Labour	K. Franklin*	1,846	35.8	−6.0
Liberal	H. Roche	848	16.4	−0.6
Communist	F. J. Keeney	66	1.3	+0.3
Majority		550	10.7	
Turnout		5,156		
Conservative gain from Labour		Swing		

=== Longsight ===
Longsight
Party	Candidate	Votes	%	±%
Conservative	A. B. Deacy*	1,593	70.5	+14.4
Labour	J. I. Owen	511	22.6	−16.2
Union Movement	W. D. Scarr	83	3.7	N/A
Communist	H. Johnson	74	3.2	+1.4
Majority		1,082	47.9	+20.6
Turnout		2,261		
Conservative hold		Swing		

=== Miles Platting ===
Miles Platting
Party	Candidate	Votes	%	±%
Conservative	G. Fildes	952	54.7	+11.2
Labour	H. W. Bliss*	788	45.3	−11.5
Majority		164	9.4	
Turnout		1,740		
Conservative gain from Labour		Swing		

=== Moss Side East ===
Moss Side East
Party	Candidate	Votes	%	±%
Conservative	S. Mottram	1,353	59.6	+14.8
Labour	H. P. D. Paget*	919	40.4	−14.8
Majority		434	19.2	
Turnout		2,272		
Conservative gain from Labour		Swing		

=== Moss Side West ===
Moss Side West
Party	Candidate	Votes	%	±%
Conservative	J. Pollitt	1,697	71.2	+12.6
Labour	S. N. M. Moxley	685	28.8	−12.6
Majority		1,012	42.4	+25.2
Turnout		2,382		
Conservative hold		Swing		

=== Moston ===
Moston
Party	Candidate	Votes	%	±%
Conservative	T. W. Bamford	3,293	64.9	+9.7
Labour	G. Halstead*	1,779	35.1	−9.7
Majority		1,514	29.8	+19.4
Turnout		5,072		
Conservative gain from Labour		Swing		

=== New Cross ===
New Cross
Party	Candidate	Votes	%	±%
Labour	R. Latham*	904	56.0	−18.8
Conservative	J. B. Chapman	711	44.0	+18.8
Majority		193	12.0	−37.6
Turnout		1,615		
Labour hold		Swing		

=== Newton Heath ===
Newton Heath
Party	Candidate	Votes	%	±%
Conservative	K. E. Goulding	1,454	53.0	+16.5
Labour	M. Johnson*	1,130	41.2	−18.3
Independent	A. E. Walsh	157	5.8	N/A
Majority		324	11.8	
Turnout		2,741		
Conservative gain from Labour		Swing		

=== Northenden ===
Northenden
Party	Candidate	Votes	%	±%
Conservative	G. Leigh*	3,745	60.3	+16.4
Labour	R. L. Griffiths	1,835	29.6	−10.7
Liberal	J. E. Hargreaves	629	10.1	−6.7
Majority		1,910	30.7	+27.1
Turnout		6,209		
Conservative hold		Swing		

=== Old Moat ===
Old Moat
Party	Candidate	Votes	%	±%
Conservative	T. F. Lavin*	1,966	59.7	+10.1
Labour	K. Roberts	992	30.1	−8.1
Liberal	A. Burns	334	10.2	−2.0
Majority		974	29.6	+18.2
Turnout		3,292		
Conservative hold		Swing		

=== Openshaw ===
Openshaw
Party	Candidate	Votes	%	±%
Labour	P. J. Donoghue*	1,548	48.3	−16.7
Conservative	J. L. Traynor	1,517	47.3	+14.8
Communist	N. Gilroy	141	4.4	+1.9
Majority		31	1.0	−31.5
Turnout		3,206		
Labour hold		Swing		

=== Rusholme ===
Rusholme
Party	Candidate	Votes	%	±%
Conservative	C. R. Mayoh*	2,000	72.7	+1.8
Labour	A. E. Jones	478	17.4	−11.7
Liberal	S. Lowe	201	7.3	N/A
Union Movement	J. Marsden	57	2.1	N/A
Independent Labour	C. H. Tremayne-Pearse	14	0.5	N/A
Majority		1,522	55.3	+13.5
Turnout		2,750		
Conservative hold		Swing		

=== St. George's ===
St. George's
Party	Candidate	Votes	%	±%
Labour	E. Mellor*	300	49.8	−22.7
Conservative	G. H. Gilbertson	242	40.2	+12.7
Liberal	S. Rose	60	10.0	N/A
Majority		58	9.6	−35.3
Turnout		602		
Labour hold		Swing		

=== St. Luke's ===
St. Luke's
Party	Candidate	Votes	%	±%
Conservative	M. Pierce	739	56.2	+29.0
Labour	S. C. Rimmer*	575	43.8	−24.3
Majority		164	12.4	
Turnout		1,314		
Conservative gain from Labour		Swing		

=== St. Mark's ===
St. Mark's
Party	Candidate	Votes	%	±%
Labour	W. Shaw*	1,094	51.8	−15.3
Conservative	A. E. Welsby	769	36.4	+15.8
Independent	R. C. Allison	250	11.8	−0.5
Majority		325	15.4	−31.1
Turnout		2,113		
Labour hold		Swing		

=== St. Peter's ===
St. Peter's
Party	Candidate	Votes	%	±%
Conservative	A. L. Lowry	841	64.7	−6.3
Labour	C. B. Muir	353	27.2	−1.8
Liberal	A. T. Parkinson	105	8.1	N/A
Majority		488	37.5	−4.5
Turnout		1,299		
Conservative hold		Swing		

=== Withington ===
Withington
Party	Candidate	Votes	%	±%
Conservative	W. Crabtree*	2,460	59.9	+12.1
Liberal	K. Pinnock	1,088	26.5	−11.3
Labour	R. K. Litherland	561	13.6	−0.8
Majority		1,372	33.4	+23.4
Turnout		4,109		
Conservative hold		Swing		

=== Woodhouse Park ===
Woodhouse Park
Party	Candidate	Votes	%	±%
Labour	W. Smith*	2,191	50.6	−13.9
Conservative	M. S. Burgoyne	2,039	47.1	+16.6
Communist	E. Holt	101	2.3	−2.7
Majority		152	3.5	−30.5
Turnout		4,331		
Labour hold		Swing		

== Aldermanic election ==
=== Aldermanic election, 6 December 1967 ===
Caused by the resignation on 22 November 1967 of Alderman Hugh Lee (Liberal, elected as an alderman by the council on 7 December 1949).

In his place, Councillor Douglas Edwards (Conservative, Burnage, elected 10 May 1951) was elected as an alderman by the council on 6 December 1967.

Party	Alderman	Ward	Term expires
Conservative	Douglas Edwards	St. Luke's	1970

=== Aldermanic election, 7 February 1968 ===
Caused by the death on 3 February 1968 of Alderman Sir Maurice Pariser (Labour, elected as an alderman by the council on 6 November 1963).

In his place, Councillor Leonard Bailey (Conservative, Alexandra Park, elected 8 May 1952) was elected as an alderman by the council on 7 December 1968.

Party	Alderman	Ward	Term expires
Conservative	Leonard Bailey	St. George's	1973

== By-elections between 1967 and 1968 ==
=== Blackley, 13 July 1967 ===
Caused by the resignation of Councillor James Lynch (Conservative, Blackley, elected 11 May 1950) on 16 June 1967.

Blackley
Party	Candidate	Votes	%	±%
Conservative	W. Harper	2,248	66.0	−3.0
Labour	A. E. Halliday	795	23.3	+3.7
Liberal	J. M. Ashley	364	10.7	+1.1
Majority		1,453	42.7	−6.7
Turnout		3,407		
Conservative hold		Swing		

=== St. Peter's, 16 November 1967 ===
Caused by the resignation of Councillor Arnold Lowry (Conservative, St. Peter's, elected 11 May 1967) on 17 October 1967.

St. Peter's
Party	Candidate	Votes	%	±%
Conservative	J. Stuart-Mills	669	64.1	−0.6
Labour	C. B. Muir	375	35.9	+8.7
Majority		294	28.2	−9.3
Turnout		1,044		
Conservative hold		Swing		

=== Burnage, 25 January 1968 ===
Caused by the election as an alderman of Councillor Douglas Edwards (Conservative, Burnage, elected 10 May 1951) on 6 December 1967, following the resignation on 22 November 1967 of Alderman Hugh Lee (Liberal, elected as an alderman by the council on 7 December 1949).

Burnage
Party	Candidate	Votes	%	±%
Conservative	W. L. Lund	1,795	62.8	−4.7
Labour	J. F. Lilley	620	21.7	−2.4
Liberal	S. B. Downs	445	15.5	+7.1
Majority		1,175	41.1	−2.3
Turnout		2,860		
Conservative hold		Swing		

=== Hugh Oldham, 14 March 1968 ===
Caused by the death of Councillor Sam Humphries (Labour, Hugh Oldham, elected 13 May 1954) on 31 December 1967.

Hugh Oldham
Party	Candidate	Votes	%	±%
Labour	S. V. Shaw	709	56.5	−2.4
Conservative	P. M. Dyas	410	32.7	−8.4
Liberal	S. Rose	135	10.8	N/A
Majority		299	23.8	+6.0
Turnout		1,254		
Labour hold		Swing		
