= Thomas Hewlett, Baron Hewlett =

British industrialist and peer

Thomas Clyde Hewlett, Baron Hewlett, CBE (4 August 1923 – 2 July 1979) was a British industrialist and life peer.

Hewlett was the son of Thomas Hewlett, an industrialist and Conservative Member of Parliament for Manchester Exchange. He was educated at Clifton College, before serving with the Royal Marines during World War II. After the war he attended Magdalene College, Cambridge, where he was president of the Cambridge Union, defeating Peter Shore in the election, and chairman of the Cambridge University Conservative Association.

Hewlett joined Anchor Chemical, the family business, in 1950, becoming a managing director in 1961 and its chairman in 1971. He was involved in Conservative politics, serving as Chairman of the National Union of Conservative and Unionist Associations from 1961 to 1966. He was President of National Conservative Convention in 1976. He was also active in numerous charities.

Having been appointed CBE in 1959 and knighted in 1964, on 26 April 1972 Hewlett was created Baron Hewlett, of Swettenham in the County of Chester.

His brother was the actor Donald Hewlett.
