= 2003 Manchester City Council election =

2003 UK local government election

- 1 May 2003

34 of 99 seats to Manchester City Council 50 seats needed for a majority
	First party	Second party	Third party
Leader	Richard Leese	Simon Ashley	Vanessa Hall
Party	Labour	Liberal Democrats	Green
Leader's seat	Crumpsall	Gorton South	Hulme
Last election	28 seats, 51.4%	6 seats, 30.7%	0 seats, 6.1%
Seats before	76	22	0
Seats won	21	12	1
Seats after	71	27	1
Seat change	▼5	▲5	▲1
Popular vote	31,296	25,261	4,528
Percentage	44.8%	36.2%	6.5%
Swing	▼6.6%	▲5.5%	▲0.4%
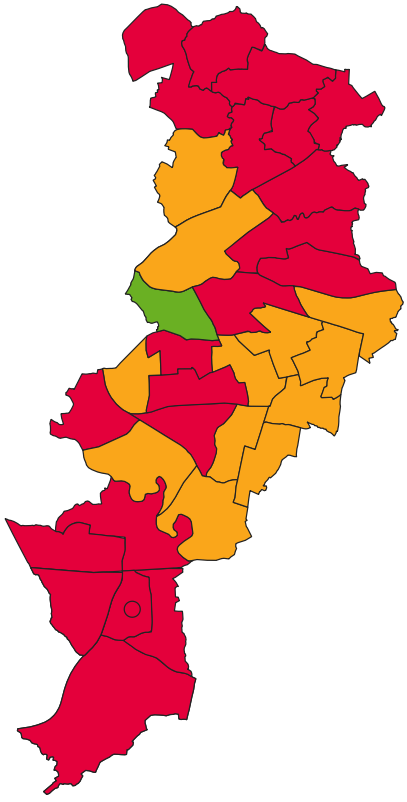
- Map of results of 2003 election
Leader of the Council before election
Richard Leese
Labour
Leader of the Council after election
Richard Leese
Labour

Elections to Manchester City Council were held on Thursday, 1 May 2003. One third of the council was up for election as well as a vacancy in Benchill, with each successful candidate to serve a one-year term of office, expiring in 2004, due to the boundary changes and 'all-out' elections due to take place in that year. Turnout was down slightly to 22.2%, with Labour retaining overall control of the council. The election saw the Greens winning their first seat, and half a dozen Liberal Democrat gains resulting in Labour's majority being the lowest in twenty years. The three Independent Labour candidates stood as "Independent Progressive Labour".

== Election result ==
Party	Votes		Seats			Full Council	
Labour Party	31,296 (44.8%)	▼6.6	21 (61.7%)	21 / 34	▼5	71 (71.7%)	71 / 99
Liberal Democrats	25,261 (36.2%)	▲5.5	12 (35.3%)	12 / 34	▲5	27 (27.3%)	27 / 99
Green Party	4,528 (6.5%)	▲0.4	1 (2.9%)	1 / 34	▲1	1 (1.0%)	1 / 99
Conservative Party	6,951 (10.0%)	▲0.9	0 (0.0%)	0 / 34	Steady	0 (0.0%)	0 / 99
Independent Labour	781 (1.1%)	▲0.3	0 (0.0%)	0 / 34	▼1	0 (0.0%)	0 / 99
Socialist Alliance	840 (1.0%)	▼0.2	0 (0.0%)	0 / 34	Steady	0 (0.0%)	0 / 99
BNP	219 (0.3%)	N/A	0 (0.0%)	0 / 34	N/A	0 (0.0%)	0 / 99
Independent	66 (0.1%)	▼0.5	0 (0.0%)	0 / 34	Steady	0 (0.0%)	0 / 99
Independent Liberal	16 (0.0%)	N/A	0 (0.0%)	0 / 34	N/A	0 (0.0%)	0 / 99

↓
1	71	27

== Ward results ==
=== Ardwick ===
Ardwick
Party	Candidate	Votes	%	±%
Labour	Bernard Priest*	806	66.1	−0.1
Liberal Democrats	Ilias Kazantzis	202	16.6	+2.8
Green	Hannah Berry	109	8.9	−3.0
Conservative	Raymond Wattenbach	102	8.4	+0.2
Majority		604	49.5	−2.9
Turnout		1,219	14.9	−1.6
Labour hold		Swing	-1.4	

=== Baguley ===
Baguley
Party	Candidate	Votes	%	±%
Labour Co-op	Edward McCulley*	905	60.1	−5.9
Conservative	Christopher Barlow	324	21.5	+4.0
Liberal Democrats	Mary Gallagher	210	13.9	+1.4
Green	Gareth Pittam	67	4.4	+0.4
Majority		581	38.6	−9.9
Turnout		1,506	17.2	−3.8
Labour hold		Swing	-4.9	

=== Barlow Moor ===
Barlow Moor
Party	Candidate	Votes	%	±%
Liberal Democrats	Neil Trafford	1,376	59.9	−1.4
Labour	Beth Morgan	621	27.0	+0.9
Conservative	James Sharman	143	6.2	+0.5
Green	John Cummings	80	3.5	−3.4
Socialist Alliance	Claire Aze	77	3.4	+3.4
Majority		755	32.9	−2.3
Turnout		2,297	21.9	−2.8
Liberal Democrats hold		Swing	-1.1	

=== Benchill ===
Benchill
Party	Candidate	Votes	%	±%
Labour	Tony Cross	592	70.4	+0.5
Labour	Richard Unwin	564		
Liberal Democrats	William Fisher	102	12.1	−3.0
Conservative	Joyce Kaye	85	10.1	+0.1
Conservative	Carol Roberts	82		
Liberal Democrats	Richard Vann	67		
Green	Peter Powell	62	7.4	+2.3
Green	Stephen Walford	50		
Majority		462	58.3	+3.5
Turnout		841	12.8	−2.6
Labour hold		Swing		
Labour hold		Swing	+1.7	

=== Beswick and Clayton ===
Beswick and Clayton
Party	Candidate	Votes	%	±%
Labour	Michael Carmody*	883	49.9	+1.9
Liberal Democrats	Elaine Boyes	748	42.3	+0.2
Conservative	Christine Birchenough	66	3.7	+0.4
Independent Labour	Fred Bates	41	2.3	−1.5
Green	Susan Fairweather	31	1.8	+0.5
Majority		135	7.6	+1.8
Turnout		1,769	26.4	−3.2
Labour hold		Swing	+0.8	

=== Blackley ===
Blackley
Party	Candidate	Votes	%	±%
Labour	Anna Trotman*	1,163	68.7	−3.3
Liberal Democrats	Carol Connell	248	14.6	−0.4
Conservative	Gerard Hopkins	207	12.2	+2.4
Green	Robin Goater	75	4.4	+1.2
Majority		915	54.0	−3.0
Turnout		1,693	21.1	−3.6
Labour hold		Swing	-1.4	

=== Bradford ===
Bradford
Party	Candidate	Votes	%	±%
Labour	John Longsden	989	61.7	+0.9
Liberal Democrats	Peter Fairhurst*	518	32.3	−2.1
Conservative	Brian Birchenough	66	4.1	+0.9
Green	Elvis Presley	30	1.9	+0.3
Majority		471	29.4	+3.0
Turnout		1,603	23.9	−7.7
Labour gain from Liberal Democrats		Swing	+1.5	

=== Brooklands ===
Brooklands
Party	Candidate	Votes	%	±%
Labour Co-op	Susan Murphy*	957	50.7	−8.1
Conservative	Jane Percival	562	29.8	−0.6
Liberal Democrats	John Ellis	228	12.1	+4.9
Green	Birgit Vollm	76	4.0	+0.4
Independent	Honor Donnelly	66	3.5	+3.5
Majority		395	20.9	−7.5
Turnout		1,889	22.5	−5.0
Labour hold		Swing	-3.7	

=== Burnage ===
Burnage
Party	Candidate	Votes	%	±%
Liberal Democrats	John Cameron	1,758	60.8	+18.7
Labour	Michael Green*	914	31.6	−14.7
Conservative	Peter Schofield	142	4.9	−3.6
Green	Michael Shaw	79	2.7	−0.5
Majority		844	29.2	+25.1
Turnout		2,893	29.1	+0.6
Liberal Democrats gain from Labour		Swing	+16.7	

=== Central ===
Central
Party	Candidate	Votes	%	±%
Liberal Democrats	Peter Rothery	1,041	49.9	+9.3
Labour	Richard Carrothers	836	40.1	−8.9
Conservative	Nicholas Davis	108	5.2	−0.7
Green	Steven Durrant	91	4.4	+0.8
Independent Labour	Derek Froggatt	11	0.5	+0.5
Majority		205	9.8	+1.4
Turnout		2,087	16.5	−3.4
Liberal Democrats gain from Labour		Swing	+9.1	

=== Charlestown ===
Charlestown
Party	Candidate	Votes	%	±%
Labour	Eric Hobin*	1,043	54.1	−6.6
Liberal Democrats	Rodney Isherwood	498	25.8	−9.2
Conservative	Marilyn Hopkins	302	15.7	+15.7
Green	Mark Gilbert	84	4.4	+0.1
Majority		545	28.3	+2.6
Turnout		1,927	22.0	−3.3
Labour hold		Swing	+1.3	

=== Cheetham ===
Cheetham
Party	Candidate	Votes	%	±%
Liberal Democrats	Qassim Afzal	1,522	49.4	+3.4
Labour	Imran Rizvi*	1,305	42.4	−8.5
Conservative	Adrian Glasspole	143	4.6	+4.6
Green	Charlotte Daws	110	3.6	+0.5
Majority		217	7.0	+2.1
Turnout		3,080	33.0	−3.0
Liberal Democrats gain from Labour		Swing	+5.9	

=== Chorlton ===
Chorlton
Party	Candidate	Votes	%	±%
Labour	Sheila Newman*	1,288	39.3	−5.4
Liberal Democrats	Howard Totty	770	23.5	+4.5
Conservative	Giles Campbell	487	14.9	−0.6
Green	Michael Daw	470	14.3	+1.2
Socialist Alliance	Heather Rose	263	8.0	+0.2
Majority		518	15.8	−9.9
Turnout		3,278	28.0	−4.0
Labour hold		Swing	-4.9	

=== Crumpsall ===
Crumpsall
Party	Candidate	Votes	%	±%
Labour	Cornelius Keegan	1,323	57.0	−4.6
Liberal Democrats	David Gordon	477	20.6	+5.9
Conservative	Garvan Walshe	350	15.1	+0.4
Green	Joseph Richardson	158	6.8	+2.5
Socialist Alliance	Karen Reissmann	12	0.5	−1.9
Majority		846	36.5	−10.4
Turnout		2,320	25.1	−3.2
Labour hold		Swing	-5.2	

=== Didsbury ===
Didsbury
Party	Candidate	Votes	%	±%
Liberal Democrats	David Sandiford*	2,116	51.8	+13.8
Labour	Geoffrey Bridson	1,257	30.8	−3.7
Conservative	Peter Hilton	491	12.0	−0.5
Green	Kathryn Brownbridge	223	5.5	+0.7
Majority		859	21.0	+17.6
Turnout		4,087	34.9	−2.1
Liberal Democrats hold		Swing	+8.7	

=== Fallowfield ===
Fallowfield
Party	Candidate	Votes	%	±%
Labour	Bernice Reid*	853	48.3	−11.9
Liberal Democrats	John-Paul Wilkins	494	28.0	+9.0
Conservative	William Langton	239	13.5	+1.0
Green	Bruce Bingham	180	10.2	+2.0
Majority		359	20.3	−20.9
Turnout		1,766	15.0	−2.3
Labour hold		Swing	-10.4	

=== Gorton North ===
Gorton North
Party	Candidate	Votes	%	±%
Liberal Democrats	Jacqueline Pearcey*	1,155	50.7	−0.3
Labour	Allan Grafton	842	36.9	+0.5
Conservative	Lisa Boardman	223	9.8	+0.3
Green	Victoria Bodgers	60	2.6	+1.2
Majority		313	13.7	−0.9
Turnout		2,280	24.0	−2.6
Liberal Democrats hold		Swing	-0.4	

=== Gorton South ===
Gorton South
Party	Candidate	Votes	%	±%
Liberal Democrats	James Ashley*	1,242	61.2	+6.9
Labour	Martin Rathfelder	630	31.0	−6.5
Green	Penelope Collins	93	4.6	+0.4
Conservative	Rosemary Bishop	65	3.2	−0.8
Majority		612	30.1	+13.2
Turnout		2,030	24.0	+1.1
Liberal Democrats hold		Swing	+6.7	

=== Harpurhey ===
Harpurhey
Party	Candidate	Votes	%	±%
Labour	Paul Fairweather	835	67.8	+1.4
Liberal Democrats	Rob Brettle	222	18.0	+5.3
Conservative	Sebastian Chowdhury	129	10.5	+1.1
Green	Darren Milton	45	3.7	+1.7
Majority		613	49.8	−3.9
Turnout		1,231	16.2	−2.8
Labour hold		Swing	-1.9	

=== Hulme ===
Hulme
Party	Candidate	Votes	%	±%
Green	Vanessa Hall	678	43.3	+1.3
Labour	John Flanagan*	667	42.6	−5.3
Liberal Democrats	Andrew Turvey	160	10.2	+1.5
Conservative	Vincent Pierce	45	2.9	+1.5
Independent Liberal	Charles Lyn-Lloyd	16	1.0	+1.0
Majority		11	0.7	−5.1
Turnout		1,566	16.0	+1.2
Green gain from Labour		Swing	+3.3	

=== Levenshulme ===
Levenshulme
Party	Candidate	Votes	%	±%
Liberal Democrats	David Hennigan*	1,625	60.8	+5.8
Labour	Michael Amesbury	667	25.0	−5.4
Green	Sean Hughes	153	5.7	−0.1
Conservative	Ann Hodkinson	128	4.8	+0.6
Socialist Alliance	Sabrina Nutter	100	3.7	−0.9
Majority		958	35.8	+11.2
Turnout		2,673	26.1	−1.1
Liberal Democrats hold		Swing	+5.6	

=== Lightbowne ===
Lightbowne
Party	Candidate	Votes	%	±%
Labour	Paul Murphy*	1,177	70.5	−0.9
Liberal Democrats	Stephen Allen	213	12.8	−0.7
Conservative	Howard Varney	198	11.9	−1.7
Green	Matthew Payne	82	4.9	+3.4
Majority		964	57.7	+0.0
Turnout		1,670	20.0	−3.0
Labour hold		Swing	-0.1	

=== Longsight ===
Longsight
Party	Candidate	Votes	%	±%
Liberal Democrats	Liaqat Ali	1,152	44.6	+15.5
Labour	Sajjad Hussain*	1,000	38.7	−15.9
Green	Spencer Fitzgibbon	255	9.9	+0.8
Conservative	Karen Abbad	177	6.8	−0.4
Majority		152	5.9	−19.6
Turnout		2,584	20.0	−0.4
Liberal Democrats gain from Labour		Swing	+15.7	

=== Moss Side ===
Moss Side
Party	Candidate	Votes	%	±%
Labour	Locita Brandy	1,182	72.2	−3.6
Liberal Democrats	Shirley Inniss	234	14.3	+5.5
Conservative	Joyce Haycock	116	7.1	+1.4
Green	Brian Sheedy	104	6.4	+1.2
Majority		948	57.9	−9.1
Turnout		1,636	18.8	−3.5
Labour hold		Swing	-4.5	

=== Moston ===
Moston
Party	Candidate	Votes	%	±%
Labour	Henry Cooper*	1,366	62.7	−0.3
Conservative	Gerald Freedman-Goldberger	507	23.3	+23.3
Liberal Democrats	Kevin Morley	198	9.1	−15.7
Green	Barry McAtarsney	109	5.0	−2.9
Majority		859	39.4	+1.2
Turnout		2,180	23.1	−1.0
Labour hold		Swing	-11.8	

=== Newton Heath ===
Newton Heath
Party	Candidate	Votes	%	±%
Labour	Richard Wilson	774	38.7	−11.6
Independent Labour	Damien O'Connor*	729	36.5	+36.5
BNP	Derek Adams	219	11.0	+11.0
Conservative	Albert Walsh	162	8.1	−2.7
Liberal Democrats	Derrick Mellor	71	3.6	−3.3
Green	Rachel Harper	44	2.2	−1.7
Majority		45	2.3	−19.8
Turnout		1,999	24.9	+1.9
Labour gain from Independent Labour		Swing	-24.0	

=== Northenden ===
Northenden
Party	Candidate	Votes	%	±%
Labour	Michael Kane*	1,112	57.7	+1.4
Conservative	Ralph Ellerton	359	18.6	−3.5
Liberal Democrats	Marguerite Goldsmith	285	14.8	+1.1
Green	Lance Crookes	171	8.9	+1.0
Majority		753	39.1	+4.9
Turnout		1,927	19.6	−4.0
Labour hold		Swing	+2.4	

=== Old Moat ===
Old Moat
Party	Candidate	Votes	%	±%
Labour	Jeffrey Smith*	1,322	46.5	−3.7
Liberal Democrats	Yasmin Zalzala	1,141	40.2	+1.3
Green	Brian Candeland	209	7.4	+1.8
Conservative	Gary Kaye	169	5.9	+0.6
Majority		181	6.4	−4.9
Turnout		2,841	22.5	−4.1
Labour hold		Swing	-2.5	

=== Rusholme ===
Rusholme
Party	Candidate	Votes	%	±%
Liberal Democrats	Lynne Williams	1,850	64.8	+25.4
Labour	Zafar Mir*	722	25.3	−23.6
Conservative	Barbara Goodall	138	4.8	−1.2
Socialist Alliance	Mary Ainslie	76	2.7	+2.7
Green	Christopher Middleton	69	2.4	−3.2
Majority		1,128	39.5	+30.1
Turnout		2,855	23.0	+1.7
Liberal Democrats gain from Labour		Swing	+24.5	

=== Sharston ===
Sharston
Party	Candidate	Votes	%	±%
Labour Co-op	Joyce Keller*	755	65.3	−1.2
Conservative	John Kenny	171	14.8	−1.2
Liberal Democrats	David Kierman	161	13.9	+1.3
Green	Richard Gee	70	6.1	+1.2
Majority		584	50.5	−0.0
Turnout		1,157	15.0	−4.0
Labour hold		Swing	-0.0	

=== Whalley Range ===
Whalley Range
Party	Candidate	Votes	%	±%
Liberal Democrats	John Grant	1,491	49.1	+19.3
Labour	Christopher Paul	1,024	33.7	−16.2
Green	Mary Candeland	276	9.1	+0.0
Conservative	Richard West	248	8.2	−3.0
Majority		467	15.4	−4.7
Turnout		3,039	30.6	−0.4
Liberal Democrats gain from Labour		Swing	+17.7	

=== Withington ===
Withington
Party	Candidate	Votes	%	±%
Liberal Democrats	Brendon Jones*	1,621	61.6	+0.1
Labour	Gerard Collier	593	22.5	−1.7
Socialist Alliance	Rachel Green	149	5.7	+2.5
Conservative	Stuart Penketh	145	5.5	+0.4
Green	Bushra Hussain	125	4.7	−1.3
Majority		1,028	39.0	+1.7
Turnout		2,633	21.6	−2.1
Liberal Democrats hold		Swing	+0.9	

=== Woodhouse Park ===
Woodhouse Park
Party	Candidate	Votes	%	±%
Labour	Brian O'Neil*	890	71.8	−0.1
Conservative	Ruby Raynor	154	12.4	+0.3
Liberal Democrats	John Reyes	132	10.7	−1.6
Green	Clifford Saffer	63	5.1	+1.4
Majority		736	59.4	−0.2
Turnout		1,239	15.7	−2.9
Labour hold		Swing	-0.2	
