= 2002 Manchester City Council election =

2002 UK local government election

- 2 May 2002

34 of 99 seats to Manchester City Council 50 seats needed for a majority
	First party	Second party	Third party
Leader	Richard Leese	Simon Ashley	Damien O'Connor
Party	Labour	Liberal Democrats	Independent Labour
Leader's seat	Crumpsall	Gorton South	Newton Heath
Last election	24 seats, 49.1%	9 seats, 32.2%	0 seats, 0.0%
Seats before	77	21	1
Seats won	28	6	0
Seats after	76	22	1
Seat change	▼1	▲1	Steady
Popular vote	40,188	24,048	625
Percentage	51.4%	30.7%	0.8%
Swing	▲2.3%	▼1.5%	▲0.8%
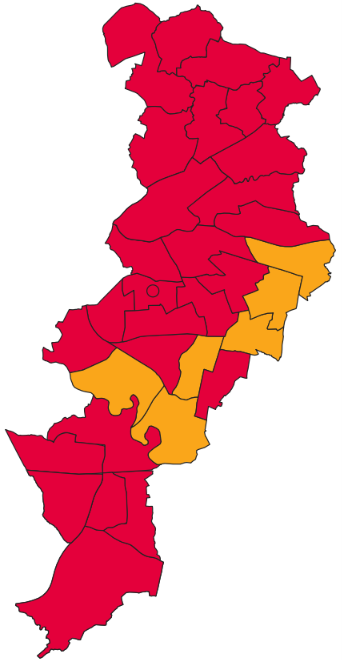
- Map of results of 2002 election
Leader of the Council before election
Richard Leese
Labour
Leader of the council after election
Richard Leese
Labour

Elections to Manchester City Council were held on Thursday, 2 May 2002. One third of the council – alongside a vacancy in Moss Side – was up for election, with each successful candidate to serve a two-year term of office, expiring in 2004, due to the boundary changes and 'all-out' elections due to take place in that year. The Independent Labour candidates stood as "Independent Progressive Labour". Overall turnout rose to 24.4% and the Labour Party retained overall control of the council.

== Election result ==
Party	Votes		Seats			Full Council	
Labour Party	40,188 (51.4%)	▲2.3	28 (82.4%)	28 / 34	▼1	76 (76.8%)	76 / 99
Liberal Democrats	24,048 (30.7%)	▼1.5	6 (17.6%)	6 / 34	▲1	22 (22.2%)	22 / 99
Independent Labour	625 (0.8%)	▲0.8	0 (0.0%)	0 / 34	Steady	1 (1.0%)	1 / 99
Conservative Party	7,152 (9.1%)	▼2.9	0 (0.0%)	0 / 34	Steady	0 (0.0%)	0 / 99
Green Party	4,747 (6.1%)	▲0.1	0 (0.0%)	0 / 34	Steady	0 (0.0%)	0 / 99
Socialist Alliance	915 (1.2%)	N/A	0 (0.0%)	0 / 34	N/A	0 (0.0%)	0 / 99
Independent	498 (0.6%)	▲0.4	0 (0.0%)	0 / 34	Steady	0 (0.0%)	0 / 99
Socialist Labour	60 (0.1%)	▼0.1	0 (0.0%)	0 / 34	Steady	0 (0.0%)	0 / 99

↓
1	76	22

== Ward results ==
=== Ardwick ===
Ardwick
Party	Candidate	Votes	%	±%
Labour	Mavis Smitheman	942	66.2	−10.1
Liberal Democrats	Judith Durrell	196	13.8	+4.5
Green	Diane Norton	169	11.9	+6.4
Conservative	Ann Hodkinson	117	8.2	−0.6
Majority		746	52.4	−14.6
Turnout		1,424	16.5	+3.2
Labour hold		Swing	-7.3	

=== Baguley ===
Baguley
Party	Candidate	Votes	%	±%
Labour Co-op	Paul Andrews	1,219	66.0	+0.6
Conservative	Ralph Ellerton	323	17.5	−2.5
Liberal Democrats	William Fisher	231	12.5	+0.2
Green	Gareth Pittam	73	4.0	+1.8
Majority		896	48.5	+3.1
Turnout		1,846	21.0	+2.7
Labour hold		Swing	+1.5	

=== Barlow Moor ===
Barlow Moor
Party	Candidate	Votes	%	±%
Liberal Democrats	John Leech	1,619	61.3	+5.1
Labour	Beth Morgan	689	26.1	+0.4
Green	Robin Goater	182	6.9	+3.4
Conservative	Thomas Bumby	150	5.7	−6.4
Majority		930	35.2	+4.6
Turnout		2,640	24.7	+3.7
Liberal Democrats hold		Swing	+2.3	

=== Benchill ===
Benchill
Party	Candidate	Votes	%	±%
Labour	Isobel Freeman*	765	69.9	+0.6
Liberal Democrats	Ann Bradshaw	165	15.1	+1.5
Conservative	Joyce Kaye	109	10.0	−2.3
Green	Hannah Berry	56	5.1	+3.5
Majority		600	54.8	−0.9
Turnout		1,095	15.4	+3.7
Labour hold		Swing	-0.4	

=== Beswick and Clayton ===
Beswick and Clayton
Party	Candidate	Votes	%	±%
Labour	Michael Loughman*	1,001	48.0	+2.2
Liberal Democrats	Elaine Boyes	879	42.1	−6.3
Independent Labour	Fred Bates	79	3.8	+3.8
Conservative	Christine Birchenough	69	3.3	−1.8
Independent	John Hulse	31	1.5	+1.5
Green	Susan Fairweather	27	1.3	+0.6
Majority		122	5.8	+3.2
Turnout		2,086	29.6	+4.4
Labour hold		Swing	+4.2	

=== Blackley ===
Blackley
Party	Candidate	Votes	%	±%
Labour	Harold Lyons*	1,462	72.0	+15.7
Liberal Democrats	Carol Connell	304	15.0	−11.8
Conservative	Daniel Bunting	199	9.8	−4.6
Green	Adam Higgin	66	3.2	+0.7
Majority		1,158	57.0	+27.5
Turnout		2,031	24.7	+4.0
Labour hold		Swing	+13.7	

=== Bradford ===
Bradford
Party	Candidate	Votes	%	±%
Labour	Neil Swannick*	1,332	60.8	+10.2
Liberal Democrats	Neil Trafford	753	34.4	−7.5
Conservative	Brian Birchenough	70	3.2	−2.6
Green	Antony Quinn	35	1.6	−0.1
Majority		579	26.4	+17.7
Turnout		2,190	31.6	+7.6
Labour hold		Swing	+8.8	

=== Brooklands ===
Brooklands
Party	Candidate	Votes	%	±%
Labour	Glynn Evans*	1,375	58.8	+8.0
Conservative	John Kenny	711	30.4	−8.9
Liberal Democrats	Karen Farnen	168	7.2	+0.1
Green	Nicola Brooks	85	3.6	+0.8
Majority		664	28.4	+16.9
Turnout		2,339	27.5	+4.5
Labour hold		Swing	+8.4	

=== Burnage ===
Burnage
Party	Candidate	Votes	%	±%
Labour	Marilyn Taylor*	1,330	46.3	+0.9
Liberal Democrats	John Cameron	1,211	42.1	+15.2
Conservative	Peter Schofield	243	8.5	−9.2
Green	Michael Shaw	91	3.2	−6.8
Majority		119	4.1	−14.4
Turnout		2,875	28.5	+6.6
Labour hold		Swing	-7.1	

=== Central ===
Central
Party	Candidate	Votes	%	±%
Labour	Jim Battle*	1,053	49.0	+13.2
Liberal Democrats	Peter Rothery	873	40.6	−15.8
Conservative	Geoffrey Berg	126	5.9	+1.3
Green	Stephen Walford	78	3.6	+0.8
Independent	Jason Ripley	20	0.9	+0.4
Majority		180	8.4	−12.1
Turnout		2,150	19.9	+0.9
Labour hold		Swing	+14.5	

=== Charlestown ===
Charlestown
Party	Candidate	Votes	%	±%
Labour	Eugene Curley*	1,363	60.7	+3.7
Liberal Democrats	Rodney Isherwood	786	35.0	−2.3
Green	Claudia French	96	4.3	−1.4
Majority		577	25.7	+6.0
Turnout		2,245	25.3	+5.7
Labour hold		Swing	+3.0	

=== Cheetham ===
Cheetham
Party	Candidate	Votes	%	±%
Labour	Martin Pagel*	1,702	50.9	−1.1
Liberal Democrats	Qassim Afzal	1,539	46.0	+1.1
Green	Joe Sheedy	105	3.1	0
Majority		163	4.9	−2.2
Turnout		3,346	36.0	+0.2
Labour hold		Swing	-1.1	

=== Chorlton ===
Chorlton
Party	Candidate	Votes	%	±%
Labour	Bernard Selby*	1,716	44.7	−2.8
Liberal Democrats	Antony Bethell	728	19.0	+4.1
Conservative	Daniel Valentine	593	15.5	−5.2
Green	Michelle Valentine	503	13.1	−3.8
Socialist Alliance	Heather Rose	298	7.8	+7.8
Majority		988	25.7	−1.1
Turnout		3,838	32.0	+5.0
Labour hold		Swing	-3.4	

=== Crumpsall ===
Crumpsall
Party	Candidate	Votes	%	±%
Labour	Alan Spinks*	1,644	61.6	−4.8
Conservative	Adrian Hutchinson	393	14.7	−5.7
Liberal Democrats	Andrew Steele	392	14.7	+5.1
Green	Angela Hall	115	4.3	+0.7
Socialist Alliance	Karen Reissmann	63	2.4	+2.4
Socialist Labour	Mervyn Drage	60	2.2	+2.2
Majority		1,251	46.9	+0.9
Turnout		2,667	28.3	+3.7
Labour hold		Swing	+0.4	

=== Didsbury ===
Didsbury
Party	Candidate	Votes	%	±%
Liberal Democrats	Helen Fisher	1,658	38.0	−6.5
Labour	Geoffrey Bridson*	1,508	34.5	+2.9
Conservative	Peter Hilton	546	12.5	−7.1
Independent	Fergus Kilroy	447	10.2	+10.2
Green	Michael Daw	209	4.8	+0.5
Majority		150	3.4	−9.5
Turnout		4,368	37.0	+2.9
Liberal Democrats gain from Labour		Swing	-4.7	

=== Fallowfield ===
Fallowfield
Party	Candidate	Votes	%	±%
Labour	Peter Morrison*	1,238	60.2	−2.1
Liberal Democrats	Howard Totty	391	19.0	+5.7
Conservative	Simon Davenport	257	12.5	−4.4
Green	Bruce Bingham	169	8.2	+0.7
Majority		847	41.2	−4.2
Turnout		2,055	17.3	+3.5
Labour hold		Swing	-3.9	

=== Gorton North ===
Gorton North
Party	Candidate	Votes	%	±%
Liberal Democrats	Wendy Helsby*	1,341	51.0	+4.9
Labour	Richard Unwin	958	36.4	−4.5
Conservative	Lisa Boardman	250	9.5	+3.5
Socialist Alliance	James Martin	43	1.6	+1.6
Green	Roisin MacDowell	38	1.4	−0.3
Majority		383	14.6	+9.5
Turnout		2,630	26.6	+1.8
Liberal Democrats hold		Swing	+4.7	

=== Gorton South ===
Gorton South
Party	Candidate	Votes	%	±%
Liberal Democrats	John Bridges*	1,133	54.3	−6.9
Labour	Martin Rathfelder	781	37.5	+5.0
Green	Penelope Collins	87	4.2	+1.4
Conservative	Rosemary Bishop	84	4.0	+0.5
Majority		352	16.9	−11.8
Turnout		2,085	22.9	+1.1
Liberal Democrats hold		Swing	-5.9	

=== Harpurhey ===
Harpurhey
Party	Candidate	Votes	%	±%
Labour	Patrick Karney*	1,014	66.4	+2.7
Liberal Democrats	David Gordon	194	12.7	−4.7
Socialist Alliance	Kay Phillips	144	9.4	+9.4
Conservative	David Timson	144	9.4	−6.4
Green	Darren Milton	31	2.0	−1.2
Majority		820	53.7	+7.4
Turnout		1,527	19.0	+3.7
Labour hold		Swing	+3.7	

=== Hulme ===
Hulme
Party	Candidate	Votes	%	±%
Labour	Mary Murphy*	680	47.9	−4.7
Green	Vanessa Hall	597	42.0	+4.6
Liberal Democrats	Matthew Armstrong	123	8.7	+8.7
Conservative	David Conway	20	1.4	−5.3
Majority		83	5.8	−9.3
Turnout		1,420	14.8	+4.2
Labour hold		Swing	-4.6	

=== Levenshulme ===
Levenshulme
Party	Candidate	Votes	%	±%
Liberal Democrats	Keith Whitmore*	1,557	55.0	−3.6
Labour	Michael Amesbury	861	30.4	+1.8
Green	Michael Brennan	163	5.8	+0.1
Socialist Alliance	Sabrina Nutter	130	4.6	+4.6
Conservative	Raymond Wattenbach	118	4.2	−2.0
Majority		696	24.6	−5.4
Turnout		2,829	27.2	+2.3
Liberal Democrats hold		Swing	-2.7	

=== Lightbowne ===
Lightbowne
Party	Candidate	Votes	%	±%
Labour	Kenneth Franklin*	1,365	71.4	+6.8
Conservative	Howard Varney	261	13.6	+13.6
Liberal Democrats	Kevin Morley	258	13.5	−14.5
Green	Matthew Payne	29	1.5	−6.0
Majority		1,104	57.7	+21.1
Turnout		1,913	23.0	+3.8
Labour hold		Swing	-3.4	

=== Longsight ===
Longsight
Party	Candidate	Votes	%	±%
Labour	Zeke Ukairo	1,521	54.6	−7.5
Liberal Democrats	Liaqat Ali	810	29.1	+19.2
Green	Spencer Fitzgibbon	255	9.1	−7.1
Conservative	Karen Abbad	202	7.2	−4.2
Majority		711	25.5	−20.4
Turnout		2,788	20.4	+2.3
Labour hold		Swing	-13.3	

=== Moss Side ===
Moss Side (2 vacancies)
Party	Candidate	Votes	%	±%
Labour	William Cox	1,510	75.8	+0.6
Labour	Roy Walters*	1,419		
Liberal Democrats	Pamela Davis	175	8.8	+0.2
Liberal Democrats	Keith Hodgkin	115		
Conservative	Mary Barnes	113	5.7	−4.5
Green	Bernard Ekbery	104	5.2	−0.8
Green	Jonathan Rummery	98		
Socialist Alliance	Robert Turnbull	90	4.5	+4.5
Conservative	Joyce Haycock	72		
Majority		1,244	67.0	+2.0
Turnout		1,992	22.3	+6.5
Labour hold		Swing		
Labour hold		Swing	+0.2	

=== Moston ===
Moston
Party	Candidate	Votes	%	±%
Labour	Derek Shaw*	1,437	63.0	+3.7
Liberal Democrats	Robert Brettle	566	24.8	−7.9
Green	Barry McAtarsney	180	7.9	+4.9
Socialist Labour	Kenneth Barr	98	4.3	−0.7
Majority		871	38.2	+11.6
Turnout		2,281	24.1	+6.5
Labour hold		Swing	+5.8	

=== Newton Heath ===
Newton Heath
Party	Candidate	Votes	%	±%
Labour	June Hitchen	975	50.3	−20.0
Independent Labour	Stephen Cooper	546	28.1	+28.1
Conservative	Albert Walsh	210	10.8	−5.3
Liberal Democrats	Ann Rodgers	133	6.9	−2.8
Green	Rachel Harper	76	3.9	−0.1
Majority		429	22.1	−32.1
Turnout		1,940	23.0	+8.0
Labour hold		Swing	-24.0	

=== Northenden ===
Northenden
Party	Candidate	Votes	%	±%
Labour	Richard Cowell*	1,324	56.3	+5.4
Conservative	Jane Percival	520	22.1	−2.6
Liberal Democrats	James Mawer	321	13.7	+1.2
Green	Lance Crookes	186	7.9	−4.0
Majority		804	34.2	+7.9
Turnout		2,351	23.6	+4.0
Labour hold		Swing	+4.0	

=== Old Moat ===
Old Moat
Party	Candidate	Votes	%	±%
Labour	Andrew Fender*	1,746	50.2	+3.1
Liberal Democrats	Yasmin Zalzala	1,352	38.9	−4.8
Green	Brian Candeland	196	5.6	+2.4
Conservative	Elliot Gold	185	5.3	+1.0
Majority		394	11.3	+7.9
Turnout		3,479	26.6	+0.6
Labour hold		Swing	+3.9	

=== Rusholme ===
Rusholme
Party	Candidate	Votes	%	±%
Labour	John Byrne*	1,304	48.9	+15.4
Liberal Democrats	Lynne Williams	1,052	39.4	−18.7
Conservative	Barbara Goodall	161	6.0	+1.8
Green	Christopher Middleton	150	5.6	+2.0
Majority		252	9.4	−15.2
Turnout		2,667	21.3	−1.0
Labour hold		Swing	+17.0	

=== Sharston ===
Sharston
Party	Candidate	Votes	%	±%
Labour	Hugh Barrett*	974	66.5	+3.8
Conservative	Carol Roberts	234	16.0	−3.7
Liberal Democrats	David Kierman	184	12.6	−1.0
Green	Simon Sobrero	72	4.9	−0.9
Majority		740	50.5	+7.4
Turnout		1,464	19.0	+4.1
Labour hold		Swing	+3.7	

=== Whalley Range ===
Whalley Range
Party	Candidate	Votes	%	±%
Labour	Bernard Stone*	1,595	49.9	−6.4
Liberal Democrats	John Grant	953	29.8	+19.9
Conservative	Nicholas Davis	359	11.2	−16.0
Green	Mary Candeland	290	9.1	+2.5
Majority		642	20.1	−9.0
Turnout		3,197	31.0	+4.2
Labour hold		Swing	-13.1	

=== Withington ===
Withington
Party	Candidate	Votes	%	±%
Liberal Democrats	Audrey Jones*	1,822	61.5	+0.2
Labour	Kate Torkington	717	24.2	+1.2
Green	June Buchan	178	6.0	−1.7
Conservative	Jonathan Smith	152	5.1	−3.0
Socialist Alliance	Toby Gibbons	96	3.2	+3.2
Majority		1,105	37.3	−1.0
Turnout		2,965	23.7	+1.8
Liberal Democrats hold		Swing	-0.5	

=== Woodhouse Park ===
Woodhouse Park
Party	Candidate	Votes	%	±%
Labour	Edward Newman	1,087	71.9	+2.6
Liberal Democrats	Derek Mellor	186	12.3	−0.6
Conservative	Ruby Raynor	183	12.1	−2.4
Green	Ashleigh Vincent	56	3.7	+0.4
Majority		901	59.6	+4.9
Turnout		1,512	18.6	+4.3
Labour hold		Swing	+1.6	

== By-election between 2002 and 2003 ==
Benchill By-Election 13 June 2002
Party	Candidate	Votes	%	±%
Labour	Ian Wilmott	440	70.5	+0.6
Liberal Democrats	Ann Bradshaw	85	13.6	−1.5
Conservative	Adrian Hutchinson	67	10.7	+0.7
Socialist Labour	Mervyn Drage	32	5.1	+5.1
Majority		355	56.9	+2.1
Turnout		624	8.8	−6.6
Labour hold		Swing	+1.0	
