= Sharston (Manchester ward) =

- Ward
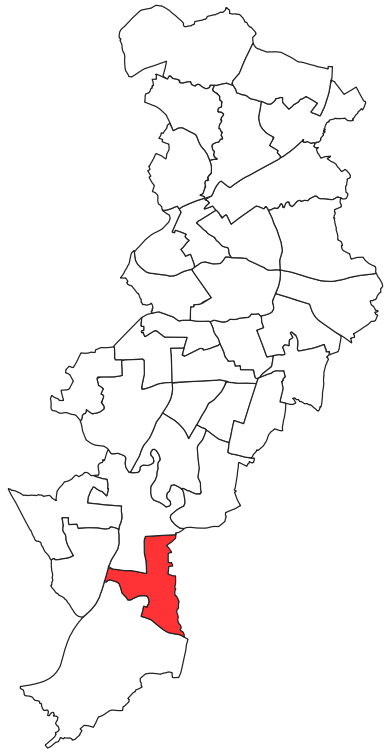
- Sharston ward (2018) within Manchester

- Coat of arms
- Country: United Kingdom
- Constituent country: England
- Region: North West England
- County: Greater Manchester
- Metropolitan borough: Manchester
- Created: May 1982
- Named for: Sharston

Government
  - Type: Unicameral
  - Body: Manchester City Council
- UK Parliamentary Constituency: Wythenshawe and Sale East

Sharston is an electoral division of Manchester City Council which has been represented since 1982. It covers the Sharston area of Wythenshawe.

== Overview ==
Sharston ward was created in 1982, covering the eastern portions of the former Crossacres ward and the Northenden ward. A further city-wide boundary revision in 2004, transferred the southern portion of the former Benchill ward to the ward. The ward's boundaries were left largely unchanged at the latest revision in 2018.

From its creation until 1997, the ward formed part of the Manchester Wythenshawe Parliamentary constituency. Since 1997, it has formed part of the Wythenshawe and Sale East Parliamentary constituency.

== Councillors ==
| Election | Councillor | Councillor | Councillor |
|---|---|---|---|
| 1982 | K. Collis (Lab) | K. Lim (Lab) | W. Jameson (Lab) |
| 1983 | K. Collis (Lab) | K. Lim (Lab) | W. Jameson (Lab) |
| 1984 | K. Collis (Lab) | K. Lim (Lab) | W. Jameson (Lab) |
| 1986 | K. Collis (Lab) | K. Lim (Lab) | W. Jameson (Lab) |
| 1987 | K. Collis (Lab) | K. Lim (Lab) | G. Mann (Lab) |
| 1988 | K. Collis (Lab) | G. Berry (Lab) | G. Mann (Lab) |
| 1990 | J. Broderick (Lab) | G. Berry (Lab) | G. A. M. Wright (Lab) |
| 1991 | J. Broderick (Lab) | G. Berry (Lab) | J. E. Keller (Lab) |
| 1992 | J. Broderick (Lab) | G. Berry (Lab) | J. E. Keller (Lab) |
| 1994 | H. Barrett (Lab) | G. Berry (Lab) | J. E. Keller (Lab) |
| 1995 | H. Barrett (Lab) | G. Berry (Lab) | J. E. Keller (Lab) |
| 1996 | H. Barrett (Lab) | G. Berry (Lab) | J. E. Keller (Lab) |
| 1998 | H. Barrett (Lab) | G. Berry (Lab) | J. E. Keller (Lab) |
| 1999 | H. Barrett (Lab) | G. Berry (Lab) | J. E. Keller (Lab) |
| 2000 | H. Barrett (Lab) | G. Berry (Lab) | J. E. Keller (Lab) |
| June 2001 | H. Barrett (Lab) | T. Judge (Lab) | J. E. Keller (Lab) |
| 2002 | H. Barrett (Lab) | T. Judge (Lab) | J. E. Keller (Lab) |
| 2003 | H. Barrett (Lab) | T. Judge (Lab) | J. E. Keller (Lab) |
| 2004 | Tommy Judge (Lab) | Joyce Keller (Lab) | Hugh Barrett (Lab) |
| 2006 | Tommy Judge (Lab) | Joyce Keller (Lab) | Hugh Barrett (Lab) |
| 2007 | Tommy Judge (Lab) | Joyce Keller (Lab) | Hugh Barrett (Lab) |
| 2008 | Tommy Judge (Lab) | Joyce Keller (Lab) | Hugh Barrett (Lab) |
| 2010 | Tommy Judge (Lab) | Joyce Keller (Lab) | Hugh Barrett (Lab) |
| 2011 | Tommy Judge (Lab) | Joyce Keller (Lab) | Hugh Barrett (Lab) |
| 2012 | Tommy Judge (Lab) | Joyce Keller (Lab) | Hugh Barrett (Lab) |
| 2014 | Tommy Judge (Lab) | Hugh Barrett (Lab) | Maddy Monaghan (Lab) |
| 2015 | Tommy Judge (Lab) | Hugh Barrett (Lab) | Maddy Monaghan (Lab) |
| 2016 | Tommy Judge (Lab) | Hugh Barrett (Lab) | Maddy Monaghan (Lab) |
| 2018 | Tommy Judge (Lab) | Maddy Monaghan (Lab) | Hugh Barrett (Lab) |
| 2019 | Tommy Judge (Lab) | Maddy Monaghan (Lab) | Tim Whiston (Lab) |
| 2021 | Tommy Judge (Lab) | Emma Taylor (Lab) | Tim Whiston (Lab) |
| 2022 | Tommy Judge (Lab) | Emma Taylor (Lab) | Tim Whiston (Lab) |
| 2023 | Tommy Judge (Lab) | Emma Taylor (Lab) | Tim Whiston (Lab) |
| 2024 | Tommy Judge (Lab) | Emma Taylor (Lab) | Tim Whiston (Lab) |
| 2026 | David McCullough (Ref UK) | Emma Taylor (Lab) | Tim Whiston (Lab) |

== Elections ==
=== Elections in 2020s ===
==== May 2026 ====
2026
| Party | Candidate | Votes | % | ±% |
|---|---|---|---|---|
| Reform | David McCullough | 1,203 | 38.2 | N/A |
| Labour | Richard Caulfield | 1,009 | 32.1 | −36.4 |
| Green | Peter Searby | 577 | 18.3 | +10.2 |
| Conservative | Gary Curran | 226 | 7.2 | −9.1 |
| Liberal Democrats | Paul Jones | 132 | 4.2 | −2.5 |
| Majority | | 194 | 6.2 | N/A |
| Turnout | | 3,147 | 26.8 | +7.5 |
| Reform gain from Labour | | Swing | | |

==== May 2024 ====
2024
| Party | Candidate | Votes | % | ±% |
|---|---|---|---|---|
| Labour | Emma Victoria Taylor* | 1,703 | 68.6 | 1.5 ▼ |
| Conservative | Glen Richard Sykes | 338 | 13.6 | 7.7 ▼ |
| Green | Brian Arthur Candeland | 270 | 10.9 | 3.1 ▲ |
| Liberal Democrats | Martha O'Donoghue | 137 | 5.5 | 4.6 ▲ |
| Majority | | 1,365 | 55.0 | |
| Rejected ballots | | 36 | 1.4 | |
| Turnout | | 2,484 | 21.5 | |
| Registered electors | | 11,576 | | |
| Labour hold | | Swing | 3.3 ▲ | |

==== May 2023 ====
2023
| Party | Candidate | Votes | % | ±% |
|---|---|---|---|---|
| Labour | Tim Whiston* | 1,581 | 69.3 | 12.6 ▲ |
| Conservative | Daniel Johnson | 349 | 15.4 | 7.0 ▲ |
| Green | Brian Candeland | 198 | 8.7 | 2.2 ▼ |
| Liberal Democrats | Ellin Saunders | 123 | 5.4 | 0.5 ▼ |
| Majority | | 1,232 | | |
| Rejected ballots | | 13 | | |
| Turnout | | 2,264 | 19.67 | |
| Registered electors | | 11,510 | | |
| Labour hold | | Swing | | |

==== May 2022 ====
2022
| Party | Candidate | Votes | % | ±% |
|---|---|---|---|---|
| Labour | Tommy Judge* | 1,525 | 68.5 | 0.4 ▲ |
| Conservative | Bheem Pulla | 363 | 16.3 | 0.9 ▼ |
| Green | Catherine Longson | 181 | 8.1 | 1.4 ▼ |
| Liberal Democrats | Robin Grayson | 148 | 6.7 | 0.5 ▲ |
| Majority | | 1,162 | 52.2 | |
| Rejected ballots | | 10 | | |
| Turnout | | 2,227 | 19.3 | 0.5 ▼ |
| Registered electors | | 11,533 | | |
| Labour hold | | Swing | 0.7 ▲ | |

==== May 2021 ====
2021
| Party | Candidate | Votes | % | ±% |
|---|---|---|---|---|
| Labour | Emma Taylor | 1,866 | 70.1 | 5.2 ▼ |
| Conservative | Tony Welch | 567 | 21.3 | 6.3 ▲ |
| Green | Astrid Johnson | 207 | 7.8 | 4.1 ▲ |
| Liberal Democrats | Bryn Coombe | 23 | 0.9 | 5.1 ▼ |
| Majority | | 1,299 | 48.8 | |
| Rejected ballots | | 25 | 0.9 | |
| Turnout | | 2,688 | 23.1 | 3.3 ▲ |
| Registered electors | | 11,659 | | |
| Labour hold | | Swing | 5.8 ▼ | |

=== Elections in 2010s ===
==== May 2019 ====
2019
| Party | Candidate | Votes | % | ±% |
|---|---|---|---|---|
| Labour Co-op | Tim Whiston | 1,286 | 56.7 | ▼8.1 |
| UKIP | Philip Matthews | 403 | 17.8 | n/a |
| Green | Sylvia Buchan | 247 | 10.9 | ▲1.4 |
| Conservative | Jagdeep Mehat | 191 | 8.4 | ▼4.5 |
| Liberal Democrats | Helen Shaw | 135 | 5.9 | ▲0.8 |
| Majority | | 883 | 38.9 | ▼5.2 |
| Rejected ballots | | 7 | 0.31 | |
| Turnout | | 2,269 | 19.73 | ▼0.1 |
| Registered electors | | 11,501 | | |
| Labour Co-op hold | | Swing | ▼12.95 | |

==== May 2018 ====
2018 (3 vacancies; new boundaries)
| Party | Candidate | Votes | % | ±% |
|---|---|---|---|---|
| Labour | Tommy Judge* | 1,555 | 68.1 | |
| Labour | Maddy Monaghan* | 1,486 | 65.1 | |
| Labour | Hugh Barrett* | 1,399 | 61.3 | |
| Conservative | Eric Houghton | 393 | 17.2 | |
| Conservative | Amandeep Kaur | 260 | 11.4 | |
| Conservative | Sukhjinder Mehat | 231 | 10.1 | |
| Green | Richard Venes | 217 | 9.5 | |
| Liberal Democrats | Sally Ashe | 141 | 6.2 | |
| Liberal Democrats | Hermione Warr | 129 | 5.7 | |
| Liberal Democrats | Asad Osman | 82 | 3.6 | |
| Majority | | | | |
| Turnout | | 2,283 | 19.8 | |
| Labour win (new boundaries) | | | | |
| Labour win (new boundaries) | | | | |
| Labour win (new boundaries) | | | | |

==== May 2016 ====
2016
| Party | Candidate | Votes | % | ±% |
|---|---|---|---|---|
| Labour | Tommy Judge* | 1,645 | 61.8 | −7.7 |
| UKIP | Bob Burke | 561 | 21.1 | +10.9 |
| Conservative | Jagdeep Singh Mehat | 227 | 8.5 | −0.6 |
| Liberal Democrats | Bernie Ryan | 100 | 3.8 | −0.4 |
| Green | Sylvia June Buchan | 92 | 3.5 | −0.3 |
| Monster Raving Loony | Silly Sir Oink A-Lot | 23 | 0.9 | n/a |
| Communist League | Peter Clifford | 12 | 0.5 | n/a |
| Majority | | 1,084 | 40.8 | |
| Turnout | | 2,660 | 23.00 | |
| Labour hold | | Swing | | |

==== May 2015 ====
2015
| Party | Candidate | Votes | % | ±% |
|---|---|---|---|---|
| Labour | Hugh Barrett | 3,146 | 55.9 | −7.4 |
| UKIP | Bob Burke | 1,128 | 20.1 | +12.5 |
| Conservative | Stephen John Hale | 834 | 14.8 | −2.5 |
| Green | Sylvia June Buchan | 228 | 4.1 | −0.5 |
| Liberal Democrats | John Yorke-Davenport | 175 | 3.1 | −1.6 |
| TUSC | Kate Armitage | 63 | 1.1 | −1.3 |
| Monster Raving Loony | Silly Sir Oink-a-lot | 53 | 0.9 | N/A |
| Majority | | 2,018 | 35.8 | |
| Turnout | | 5,627 | 47.8 | +22.7 |
| Labour hold | | Swing | | |

==== May 2014 ====
2014 (2 vacancies)
| Party | Candidate | Votes | % | ±% |
|---|---|---|---|---|
| Labour | Madeleine Monaghan | 1,450 | | |
| Labour | Hugh Barrett* | 1,406 | | |
| UKIP | Bob Burke | 848 | | |
| Conservative | David Morgan | 307 | | |
| Green | Alison Jane Hunt | 216 | | |
| Liberal Democrats | John Frazer Yorke-Davenport | 142 | | |
| Respect | Catherine Higgins | 141 | | |
| Liberal Democrats | Robert Summerill | 89 | | |
| Majority | | 558 | | |
| Turnout | | | 23.3 | |
| Labour hold | | Swing | | |

==== May 2012 ====
2012
| Party | Candidate | Votes | % | ±% |
|---|---|---|---|---|
| Labour | Tommy Judge* | 1,666 | 69.5 | +22.3 |
| UKIP | Dean Roberts | 244 | 10.2 | N/A |
| Conservative | Jim McCullough | 218 | 9.1 | −23.6 |
| Liberal Democrats | Dave Page | 100 | 4.2 | −7.4 |
| Green | Alison Hunt | 91 | 3.8 | −4.6 |
| TUSC | Trevor Prior | 78 | 3.3 | N/A |
| Majority | | 1,422 | 59 | |
| Turnout | | 2397 | 20.44 | |
| Labour hold | | Swing | | |

==== May 2011 ====
2011
| Party | Candidate | Votes | % | ±% |
|---|---|---|---|---|
| Labour Co-op | Joyce Keller* | 1,845 | 63.3 | +10.8 |
| Conservative | Jim McCullough | 505 | 17.3 | −8.2 |
| UKIP | Eugene Cassidy | 222 | 7.6 | N/A |
| Liberal Democrats | Dave Page | 138 | 4.7 | −7.6 |
| Green | Dane Lam | 133 | 4.6 | −5.1 |
| TUSC | Shari Holden | 70 | 2.4 | N/A |
| Majority | | 1,340 | 46.0 | |
| Turnout | | 2,913 | 25.1 | |
| Labour Co-op hold | | Swing | | |

==== May 2010 ====
2010
| Party | Candidate | Votes | % | ±% |
|---|---|---|---|---|
| Labour Co-op | Hugh Barrett* | 2,335 | 45.6 | −1.6 |
| Conservative | Gregory Barrie Davis | 933 | 18.2 | −14.5 |
| Liberal Democrats | Francesca Bliss | 930 | 18.2 | +6.6 |
| BNP | Bernard Todd | 371 | 7.2 | +7.2 |
| UKIP | Robert Edward Burke | 283 | 5.5 | +5.5 |
| Independent | Jimmy McCullough | 157 | 3.1 | +3.1 |
| Green | Luke Smith | 114 | 2.2 | −6.2 |
| Majority | | 1,402 | 27.4 | +13.7 |
| Turnout | | 5,123 | 44.4 | +23.3 |
| Labour hold | | Swing | +6.4 | |

=== Elections in 2000s ===
==== May 2008 ====
2008
| Party | Candidate | Votes | % | ±% |
|---|---|---|---|---|
| Labour Co-op | Tommy Judge* | 1,115 | 47.2 | −5.3 |
| Conservative | Jimmy McCullough | 773 | 32.7 | +7.2 |
| Liberal Democrats | Bill Fisher | 274 | 11.6 | −0.7 |
| Green | Karen Duffy | 199 | 8.4 | −1.3 |
| Majority | | 324 | 13.7 | −13.3 |
| Turnout | | 2,361 | 21.1 | −0.7 |
| Labour hold | | Swing | -6.2 | |

==== May 2007 ====
2007
| Party | Candidate | Votes | % | ±% |
|---|---|---|---|---|
| Labour Co-op | Joyce Keller* | 1,242 | 52.5 | −2.5 |
| Conservative | Jimmy McCullough | 604 | 25.5 | +7.8 |
| Liberal Democrats | Tina Dunican | 290 | 12.3 | −3.3 |
| Green | Amanda Collins | 229 | 9.7 | −1.8 |
| Majority | | 638 | 27.0 | −10.3 |
| Turnout | | 2,365 | 21.8 | +0.4 |
| Labour hold | | Swing | -5.1 | |

==== May 2006 ====
2006
| Party | Candidate | Votes | % | ±% |
|---|---|---|---|---|
| Labour Co-op | Hugh Barrett* | 1,248 | 55.0 | +4.7 |
| Conservative | Agnes Anne Carroll | 402 | 17.7 | −1.1 |
| Liberal Democrats | William David Fisher | 355 | 15.6 | −0.9 |
| Green | Karen Jane Duffy | 264 | 11.5 | −2.9 |
| Majority | | 846 | 37.3 | +5.8 |
| Turnout | | 2,269 | 21.4 | −5.6 |
| Labour hold | | Swing | +2.9 | |

==== June 2004 ====
2004 (3 vacancies; new boundaries)
| Party | Candidate | Votes | % | ±% |
|---|---|---|---|---|
| Labour Co-op | Thomas Judge* | 1,411 | 50.9 | |
| Labour Co-op | Joyce Keller* | 1,349 | 48.7 | |
| Labour Co-op | Hugh Barratt* | 1,271 | 45.9 | |
| Conservative | Joyce Kaye | 527 | 19.0 | |
| Conservative | Trevor Roberts | 524 | 18.9 | |
| Conservative | Agnes Carroll | 515 | 18.6 | |
| Liberal Democrats | Jeanette McKay | 463 | 16.7 | |
| Green | Christopher Ireland | 403 | 14.5 | |
| Liberal Democrats | Ann Rodgers | 396 | 14.3 | |
| Liberal Democrats | Robert West | 310 | 11.2 | |
| Majority | | 744 | 26.9 | |
| Turnout | | 2,772 | 27.0 | |
| Labour Co-op win (new seat) | | | | |
| Labour Co-op win (new seat) | | | | |
| Labour Co-op win (new seat) | | | | |

==== May 2003 ====
2003
| Party | Candidate | Votes | % | ±% |
|---|---|---|---|---|
| Labour Co-op | Joyce Keller* | 755 | 65.3 | −1.2 |
| Conservative | John Kenny | 171 | 14.8 | −1.2 |
| Liberal Democrats | David Kierman | 161 | 13.9 | +1.3 |
| Green | Richard Gee | 70 | 6.1 | +1.2 |
| Majority | | 584 | 50.5 | −0.0 |
| Turnout | | 1,157 | 15.0 | −4.0 |
| Labour hold | | Swing | -0.0 | |

==== May 2002 ====
2002
| Party | Candidate | Votes | % | ±% |
|---|---|---|---|---|
| Labour | Hugh Barrett* | 974 | 66.5 | +3.8 |
| Conservative | Carol Roberts | 234 | 16.0 | −3.7 |
| Liberal Democrats | David Kierman | 184 | 12.6 | −1.0 |
| Green | Simon Sobrero | 72 | 4.9 | −0.9 |
| Majority | | 740 | 50.5 | +7.4 |
| Turnout | | 1,464 | 19.0 | +4.1 |
| Labour hold | | Swing | +3.7 | |

==== June 2001 (by-election) ====
By-election: 10 June 2001
| Party | Candidate | Votes | % | ±% |
|---|---|---|---|---|
| Labour | Thomas Judge | 2,170 | 69.8 | +7.1 |
| Conservative | David Timson | 497 | 16.0 | −3.7 |
| Liberal Democrats | David Kierman | 440 | 14.2 | +0.6 |
| Majority | | 1,673 | 53.8 | +10.7 |
| Turnout | | 3,107 | | |
| Labour hold | | Swing | +5.4 | |

==== May 2000 ====
2000
| Party | Candidate | Votes | % | ±% |
|---|---|---|---|---|
| Labour | Griffith Berry* | 683 | 62.7 | −9.1 |
| Conservative | David Russell | 214 | 19.7 | +5.3 |
| Liberal Democrats | David Kierman | 148 | 13.6 | +2.8 |
| Green | Steven Anderson | 44 | 4.0 | +1.0 |
| Majority | | 469 | 43.1 | −14.4 |
| Turnout | | 1,089 | 14.9 | −1.8 |
| Labour hold | | Swing | -7.2 | |

=== Elections in 1990s ===
==== May 1999 ====
1999
| Party | Candidate | Votes | % | ±% |
|---|---|---|---|---|
| Labour | Joyce Keller* | 905 | 71.8 | −1.6 |
| Conservative | John Nelson | 181 | 14.4 | +3.6 |
| Liberal Democrats | Karen Farnen | 136 | 10.8 | −5.0 |
| Green | Steven Anderson | 38 | 3.0 | +3.0 |
| Majority | | 724 | 57.5 | −5.1 |
| Turnout | | 1,260 | 16.7 | |
| Labour hold | | Swing | -2.6 | |

==== May 1998 ====
1998
| Party | Candidate | Votes | % | ±% |
|---|---|---|---|---|
| Labour | Hugh Barrett* | 910 | 73.4 | −2.3 |
| Liberal Democrats | Karen Farnen | 196 | 15.8 | +5.3 |
| Conservative | George Stars | 134 | 10.8 | −0.1 |
| Majority | | 776 | 62.6 | −2.3 |
| Turnout | | 1,240 | | |
| Labour hold | | Swing | -3.8 | |

==== May 1996 ====
1996
| Party | Candidate | Votes | % | ±% |
|---|---|---|---|---|
| Labour | Griffith Berry* | 1,298 | 75.7 | −3.6 |
| Conservative | Robert Caddick | 186 | 10.9 | +0.9 |
| Liberal Democrats | S. Toole | 180 | 10.5 | +1.6 |
| Green | P. Johnson | 50 | 2.9 | +2.9 |
| Majority | | 1,112 | 64.9 | −4.4 |
| Turnout | | 1,714 | | |
| Labour hold | | Swing | -2.2 | |

==== May 1995 ====
1995
| Party | Candidate | Votes | % | ±% |
|---|---|---|---|---|
| Labour | Joyce Keller* | 1,593 | 79.3 | +9.0 |
| Conservative | I. Hollins | 201 | 10.0 | −3.0 |
| Liberal Democrats | Cath Hall | 179 | 8.9 | −3.1 |
| Independent | R. Garside | 36 | 1.8 | +1.8 |
| Majority | | 1,392 | 69.3 | +12.0 |
| Turnout | | 2,009 | | |
| Labour hold | | Swing | +6.0 | |

==== May 1994 ====
1994
| Party | Candidate | Votes | % | ±% |
|---|---|---|---|---|
| Labour | H. Barrett | 1,680 | 70.3 | +23.0 |
| Conservative | I. Hollins | 310 | 13.0 | −25.8 |
| Liberal Democrats | W. Fisher | 286 | 12.0 | +2.3 |
| Green | G. Lawson | 114 | 4.8 | +0.5 |
| Majority | | 1,370 | 57.3 | +48.5 |
| Turnout | | 2,390 | | |
| Labour hold | | Swing | +24.4 | |

==== May 1992 ====
1992
| Party | Candidate | Votes | % | ±% |
|---|---|---|---|---|
| Labour | G. Berry* | 1,149 | 47.3 | −6.9 |
| Conservative | A. Bourne | 943 | 38.8 | +13.4 |
| Liberal Democrats | S. Toole | 235 | 9.7 | −4.9 |
| Green | G. Lawson | 104 | 4.3 | −1.5 |
| Majority | | 206 | 8.5 | −20.3 |
| Turnout | | 2,431 | | |
| Labour hold | | Swing | -10.1 | |

==== May 1991 ====
1991
| Party | Candidate | Votes | % | ±% |
|---|---|---|---|---|
| Labour | J. E. Keller | 1,746 | 54.2 | +0.1 |
| Conservative | T. J. Roberts | 819 | 25.4 | +5.3 |
| Liberal Democrats | I. G. Davies | 472 | 14.6 | +1.8 |
| Green | G. A. Lawson | 186 | 5.8 | −7.1 |
| Majority | | 927 | 28.8 | −5.2 |
| Turnout | | 3,223 | 35.7 | |
| Labour hold | | Swing | -2.6 | |

==== May 1990 ====
1990 (2 vacancies)
| Party | Candidate | Votes | % | ±% |
|---|---|---|---|---|
| Labour | J. Broderick | 2,258 | 54.1 | +1.3 |
| Labour | G. A. M. Wright | 2,159 | | |
| Conservative | C. Roberts | 839 | 20.1 | −8.7 |
| Conservative | T. J. Roberts | 808 | | |
| Green | G. A. Lawson | 539 | 12.9 | +12.9 |
| Liberal Democrats | H. Griffiths | 536 | 12.8 | −5.6 |
| Liberal Democrats | D. W. Fake | 355 | | |
| Majority | | 1,320 | 34.0 | +10.0 |
| Turnout | | 4,172 | | |
| Labour hold | | Swing | | |
| Labour hold | | Swing | +5.0 | |

=== Elections in 1980s ===
==== May 1988 ====
1988
| Party | Candidate | Votes | % | ±% |
|---|---|---|---|---|
| Labour | G. Berry | 2,051 | 52.8 | +14.3 |
| Conservative | A. R. Williams | 1,119 | 28.8 | +1.2 |
| SLD | R. Bowers | 717 | 18.4 | −15.5 |
| Majority | | 932 | 24.0 | +19.4 |
| Turnout | | 3,887 | | |
| Labour hold | | Swing | +6.5 | |

==== May 1987 ====
1987
| Party | Candidate | Votes | % | ±% |
|---|---|---|---|---|
| Labour | George Mann | 1,801 | 38.5 | −26.0 |
| SDP | Robert Bowers | 1,585 | 33.9 | −1.6 |
| Conservative | Alan Williams | 1,292 | 27.6 | +27.6 |
| Majority | | 216 | 4.6 | −24.5 |
| Turnout | | 4,678 | | |
| Labour hold | | Swing | -12.2 | |

==== May 1986 ====
1986
| Party | Candidate | Votes | % | ±% |
|---|---|---|---|---|
| Labour | Ken Collis* | 2,298 | 64.5 | +11.5 |
| SDP | R. Bowers | 1,263 | 35.5 | +21.2 |
| Majority | | 1,035 | 29.1 | +8.7 |
| Turnout | | 3,561 | | |
| Labour hold | | Swing | -4.8 | |

==== May 1984 ====
1984
| Party | Candidate | Votes | % | ±% |
|---|---|---|---|---|
| Labour | Kevan Lim* | 2,213 | 53.0 | +6.6 |
| Conservative | A. Kenyon | 1,362 | 32.6 | +1.4 |
| Liberal | Herbert Griffiths | 598 | 14.3 | −7.6 |
| Majority | | 851 | 20.4 | +5.2 |
| Turnout | | 4,173 | | |
| Labour hold | | Swing | +2.6 | |

==== May 1983 ====
1983
| Party | Candidate | Votes | % | ±% |
|---|---|---|---|---|
| Labour | William Jameson* | 2,080 | 46.4 | +2.8 |
| Conservative | Annie Spencer | 1,398 | 31.2 | +0.8 |
| Liberal | Herbert Griffiths | 979 | 21.9 | −3.7 |
| Majority | | 682 | 15.2 | +2.0 |
| Turnout | | 4,479 | | |
| Labour hold | | Swing | +1.0 | |

==== May 1982 ====
1982 (3 vacancies)
| Party | Candidate | Votes | % | ±% |
|---|---|---|---|---|
| Labour | Kenneth Collis* | 1,906 | 42.1 | |
| Labour | Kevan Lim* | 1,787 | 39.4 | |
| Labour | William Jameson | 1,735 | 38.3 | |
| Conservative | Annie Spencer | 1,329 | 29.3 | |
| Conservative | Rodney Munn | 1,322 | 29.2 | |
| Conservative | Kathleen Hay | 1,290 | 28.5 | |
| SDP | Eileen Bowers | 1,115 | 24.6 | |
| SDP | Robert Bowers | 1,112 | 24.5 | |
| SDP | Angus Bateman* | 1,052 | 23.2 | |
| Majority | | 406 | 9.0 | |
| Turnout | | 4,530 | 46.6 | |
| Labour win (new seat) | | | | |
| Labour win (new seat) | | | | |
| Labour win (new seat) | | | | |

== See also ==
- Manchester City Council
- Manchester City Council elections
