= 1999 Manchester City Council election =

1999 UK local government election

- 6 May 1999

34 of 99 seats to Manchester City Council 50 seats needed for a majority
	First party	Second party
Leader	Richard Leese	Simon Ashley
Party	Labour	Liberal Democrats
Leader's seat	Crumpsall	Gorton South
Last election	30 seats, 52.9%	5 seats, 28.5%
Seats before	83	16
Seats won	27	7
Seats after	80	19
Seat change	▼3	▲3
Popular vote	36,674	20,812
Percentage	53.4%	30.3%
Swing	▲0.5%	▲1.8%
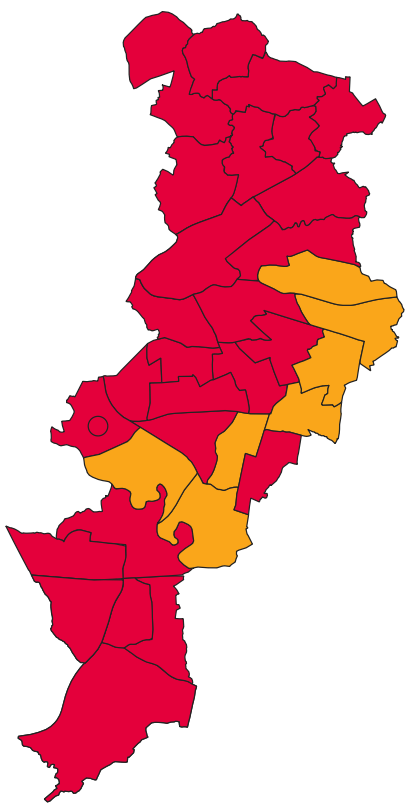
- Map of results of 1999 election
Leader of the Council before election
Richard Leese
Labour
Leader of the Council after election
Richard Leese
Labour

Elections to Manchester City Council were held on Thursday, 6 May 1999. One third of the council was up for election, as well as a vacancy in Chorlton, with each successful candidate to serve a four-year term of office, expiring in 2003. The two Independent Labour candidates stood as "Peace 2000 England's Republic", a slight alteration on the previous year's "Labour Peace 2000". Overall turnout was up marginally from the previous year at 21.9%. The Labour Party retained overall control of the Council.

== Election result ==
Party	Votes		Seats			Full Council	
Labour Party	36,674 (53.4%)	▲0.5	27 (79.4%)	27 / 34	▼3	80 (80.8%)	80 / 99
Liberal Democrats	20,812 (30.3%)	▲1.8	7 (20.6%)	7 / 34	▲3	19 (19.2%)	19 / 99
Conservative Party	8,050 (11.7%)	▼1.1	0 (0.0%)	0 / 34	Steady	0 (0.0%)	0 / 99
Green Party	2,717 (3.9%)	▲0.5	0 (0.0%)	0 / 34	Steady	0 (0.0%)	0 / 99
Independent	150 (0.2%)	▲0.1	0 (0.0%)	0 / 34	Steady	0 (0.0%)	0 / 99
Socialist Labour	142 (0.2%)	▼1.3	0 (0.0%)	0 / 34	Steady	0 (0.0%)	0 / 99
Independent Labour	42 (0.0%)	▼0.5	0 (0.0%)	0 / 34	Steady	0 (0.0%)	0 / 99
Independent Liberal	22 (0.0%)	Steady	0 (0.0%)	0 / 34	Steady	0 (0.0%)	0 / 99
Communist League	19 (0.0%)	N/A	0 (0.0%)	0 / 34	N/A	0 (0.0%)	0 / 99

↓
80	19

== Ward results ==
=== Ardwick ===
Ardwick
Party	Candidate	Votes	%	±%
Labour	Bernard Priest*	813	76.3	+10.3
Liberal Democrats	Derek Maloney	109	10.2	−1.7
Conservative	Fanny Davenport	97	9.1	−1.6
Green	Bruce Bingham	47	4.4	−1.3
Majority		704	66.0	+11.9
Turnout		1,066	13.6	
Labour hold		Swing	+5.9	

=== Baguley ===
Baguley
Party	Candidate	Votes	%	±%
Labour	Gerald Jones*	1,151	72.7	+2.9
Conservative	Ruby Byrom	276	17.4	−2.1
Liberal Democrats	William Fisher	156	9.9	−0.9
Majority		875	55.3	+5.0
Turnout		1,583	19.2	
Labour hold		Swing	+2.5	

=== Barlow Moor ===
Barlow Moor
Party	Candidate	Votes	%	±%
Liberal Democrats	Richard Powell	1,611	55.5	−2.3
Labour	Kathleen Bloch*	1,030	35.5	+1.8
Conservative	Thomas Bumby	159	5.5	−0.7
Green	Brian Candeland	102	3.5	+3.5
Majority		581	20.0	−10.8
Turnout		2,902	26.6	
Liberal Democrats gain from Labour		Swing	-2.0	

=== Benchill ===
Benchill
Party	Candidate	Votes	%	±%
Labour	Niel Warren*	790	79.7	+3.6
Liberal Democrats	Janice Redmond	111	11.2	−5.9
Conservative	Brian Birchenough	90	9.1	+2.4
Majority		679	68.5	+8.5
Turnout		991	13.6	
Labour hold		Swing	+4.7	

=== Beswick and Clayton ===
Beswick and Clayton
Party	Candidate	Votes	%	±%
Labour	Michael Carmody	1,024	56.4	+4.0
Liberal Democrats	Kenneth Dobson*	706	38.9	−5.1
Conservative	Albert Walsh	84	4.6	+1.0
Majority		318	17.5	+9.0
Turnout		1,814	24.8	
Labour gain from Liberal Democrats		Swing	+4.5	

=== Blackley ===
Blackley
Party	Candidate	Votes	%	±%
Labour	Anna Trotman	960	59.9	−8.5
Liberal Democrats	Carol Connell	452	28.2	+12.6
Conservative	Dorothy Keller	192	12.0	−4.0
Majority		508	31.7	−20.7
Turnout		1,604	19.0	
Labour hold		Swing	-10.5	

=== Bradford ===
Bradford
Party	Candidate	Votes	%	±%
Liberal Democrats	Peter Fairhurst	978	54.6	+20.1
Labour	Margaret Smith*	761	42.5	−15.9
Conservative	Joyce Haycock	53	3.0	−4.1
Majority		217	12.1	−11.7
Turnout		1,792	24.6	
Liberal Democrats gain from Labour		Swing	+18.0	

=== Brooklands ===
Brooklands
Party	Candidate	Votes	%	±%
Labour	Susan Murphy*	1,106	57.5	+3.0
Conservative	Ian Bradshaw	579	30.1	−2.6
Liberal Democrats	Peter Rothery	238	12.4	−0.4
Majority		527	27.4	+5.6
Turnout		1,923	20.0	
Labour hold		Swing	+2.8	

=== Burnage ===
Burnage
Party	Candidate	Votes	%	±%
Labour	Michael Green*	1,274	60.7	−2.3
Conservative	Peter Schofield	408	19.4	+0.9
Liberal Democrats	Robert Harrison	321	15.3	+0.1
Green	Michael Shaw	72	3.4	+0.1
Independent Labour	Michael Robinson	25	1.2	+1.2
Majority		866	41.2	−3.2
Turnout		2,100	21.3	
Labour hold		Swing	-1.6	

=== Central ===
Central
Party	Candidate	Votes	%	±%
Labour	Bill Egerton	676	61.0	−15.2
Liberal Democrats	Marcus Ramsbottom	292	26.4	+14.6
Conservative	Nicholas Davis	93	8.4	+8.4
Green	William Kearns	47	4.2	−7.8
Majority		384	34.7	−29.5
Turnout		1,108	13.2	
Labour hold		Swing	-14.9	

=== Charlestown ===
Charlestown
Party	Candidate	Votes	%	±%
Labour	Eric Hobin*	1,023	61.9	−3.5
Liberal Democrats	Rodney Isherwood	414	25.1	+5.6
Conservative	Vivienne Clarke	215	13.0	−2.7
Majority		609	36.9	−9.1
Turnout		1,652	19.2	
Labour hold		Swing	-4.5	

=== Cheetham ===
Cheetham
Party	Candidate	Votes	%	±%
Labour	Imran Rizvi	1,799	62.5	+15.8
Liberal Democrats	Mohammed Sabir	882	30.6	−13.8
Conservative	Adam Gibson	132	4.6	−2.5
Green	Paddy McCloy	53	1.8	+1.8
Independent	Ahmed Zubair	13	0.5	−1.2
Majority		917	31.9	+29.6
Turnout		2,879	31.8	
Labour hold		Swing	+14.8	

=== Chorlton ===
Chorlton
Party	Candidate	Votes	%	±%
Labour	Sheila Newman	1,723	48.6	+5.1
Labour	Valerie Stevens*	1,666		
Conservative	Malcolm Cleall-Hill	703	19.8	−1.1
Conservative	Ian Paley	691		
Green	Julian Parry	675	19.0	+5.5
Liberal Democrats	Catherine Hall	446	12.6	−0.6
Liberal Democrats	Derek Mellor	355		
Majority		963	28.8	+6.2
Turnout		3,547	28.4	
Labour hold		Swing		
Labour hold		Swing	+3.1	

=== Crumpsall ===
Crumpsall
Party	Candidate	Votes	%	±%
Labour	Thomas Lister	1,525	68.8	+0.7
Conservative	Jacqueline Rowland	367	16.6	−1.0
Liberal Democrats	David Gordon	248	11.2	−3.1
Green	Christopher Middleton	77	3.5	+3.5
Majority		1,158	52.2	+1.8
Turnout		2,217	23.7	
Labour hold		Swing	+0.8	

=== Didsbury ===
Didsbury
Party	Candidate	Votes	%	±%
Liberal Democrats	David Sandiford	1,813	44.6	+18.8
Labour	Frances Ives	1,325	32.6	−10.9
Conservative	Peter Hilton	928	22.8	−4.1
Majority		488	12.0	−4.6
Turnout		4,066	35.1	
Liberal Democrats gain from Labour		Swing	+14.8	

=== Fallowfield ===
Fallowfield
Party	Candidate	Votes	%	±%
Labour	Bernice Reid*	1,005	59.0	+5.6
Liberal Democrats	Shakeel Ahmed	339	19.9	+4.1
Conservative	David Saville	257	15.1	−0.6
Green	Hannah Berry	85	5.0	+0.1
Independent Labour	Thomas Kelly	17	1.0	−5.4
Majority		666	39.1	+1.6
Turnout		1,703	13.6	
Labour hold		Swing	+0.7	

=== Gorton North ===
Gorton North
Party	Candidate	Votes	%	±%
Liberal Democrats	Jacqueline Pearcey*	1,419	54.5	+4.5
Labour	Elaine O'Connor	1,049	40.3	−3.7
Conservative	Simon Davenport	137	5.3	+1.4
Majority		370	14.2	+8.2
Turnout		2,605	26.2	
Liberal Democrats hold		Swing	+4.1	

=== Gorton South ===
Gorton South
Party	Candidate	Votes	%	±%
Liberal Democrats	James Ashley*	1,368	60.9	+0.1
Labour	Kenneth Strath	805	35.9	+4.1
Conservative	Ann Hodkinson	72	3.2	−0.2
Majority		563	25.1	−3.9
Turnout		2,245	25.0	
Liberal Democrats hold		Swing	-2.0	

=== Harpurhey ===
Harpurhey
Party	Candidate	Votes	%	±%
Labour	Nilofar Siddiqi*	799	67.0	+3.2
Liberal Democrats	Daniel Campbell	243	20.4	−3.4
Conservative	Rodney Keller	150	12.6	+0.2
Majority		556	46.6	+6.6
Turnout		1,192	15.3	
Labour hold		Swing	+3.3	

=== Hulme ===
Hulme
Party	Candidate	Votes	%	±%
Labour	John Flanagan	644	55.3	−8.1
Liberal Democrats	Phylip Mahler	230	19.7	+8.7
Green	John Poole	202	17.3	+3.8
Conservative	David Conway	67	5.8	−1.9
Independent Liberal	Charles Lyn-Lloyd	22	1.9	−0.2
Majority		414	35.5	−14.4
Turnout		1,165	13.6	
Labour hold		Swing	-8.4	

=== Levenshulme ===
Levenshulme
Party	Candidate	Votes	%	±%
Liberal Democrats	David Hennigan	1,504	57.2	−0.5
Labour	Nicholas Macgregor	803	30.6	+1.9
Independent	John Howard	125	4.8	+4.8
Conservative	Paul Kierman	98	3.7	−1.8
Green	Michael Daw	79	3.0	0
Communist League	Paul Galloway	19	0.7	+0.7
Majority		701	26.7	−2.3
Turnout		2,628	25.9	
Liberal Democrats hold		Swing	-1.2	

=== Lightbowne ===
Lightbowne
Party	Candidate	Votes	%	±%
Labour	Paul Murphy	1,231	71.7	−0.0
Conservative	Teresa Skorzewski	270	15.7	+1.2
Liberal Democrats	Elsie Slater	217	12.6	−1.3
Majority		961	55.9	−1.3
Turnout		1,718	20.1	
Labour hold		Swing	-0.6	

=== Longsight ===
Longsight
Party	Candidate	Votes	%	±%
Labour	Sajjad Hussain	1,369	49.1	−6.8
Liberal Democrats	Rashid Ahmed	717	25.7	+13.9
Green	Spencer Fitzgibbon	455	16.3	+1.0
Conservative	John Davenport	237	8.5	−3.2
Independent	Comrade Ibraham	12	0.4	+0.4
Majority		652	23.4	−17.2
Turnout		2,790	22.3	
Labour hold		Swing	-10.3	

=== Moss Side ===
Moss Side
Party	Candidate	Votes	%	±%
Labour	Claire Nangle*	1,111	77.3	+1.0
Conservative	Mary Barnes	131	9.1	+0.3
Green	Vanessa Hall	98	6.8	+3.8
Liberal Democrats	Peter Jinks	98	6.8	−3.2
Majority		980	68.2	+1.9
Turnout		1,438	16.5	
Labour hold		Swing	+0.3	

=== Moston ===
Moston
Party	Candidate	Votes	%	±%
Labour	Henry Cooper*	1,478	69.2	+4.6
Liberal Democrats	Joyce Laslett	355	16.6	−0.3
Conservative	Gregory Skorzewski	304	14.2	−4.2
Majority		1,123	52.6	+6.4
Turnout		2,137	21.9	
Labour hold		Swing	+2.4	

=== Newton Heath ===
Newton Heath
Party	Candidate	Votes	%	±%
Labour	Damien O'Connor*	1,126	78.6	−1.8
Conservative	Raymond Wattenbach	137	9.6	−0.5
Liberal Democrats	Ann Rodgers	135	9.4	−0.1
Green	Cae Gests	35	2.4	+2.4
Majority		989	69.0	−1.3
Turnout		1,433	17.5	
Labour hold		Swing	-0.6	

=== Northenden ===
Northenden
Party	Candidate	Votes	%	±%
Labour	Michael Kane*	1,198	60.0	+1.9
Conservative	Richard West	360	17.7	+2.1
Green	Lance Crookes	246	12.1	−3.5
Liberal Democrats	Jeanette McKay	227	11.2	+0.5
Majority		838	41.3	−1.2
Turnout		2,031	21.1	
Labour hold		Swing	-0.1	

=== Old Moat ===
Old Moat
Party	Candidate	Votes	%	±%
Labour	Jeffrey Smith*	1,603	49.6	−0.2
Liberal Democrats	Yasmin Zalzala	1,326	41.0	+4.2
Conservative	Lynda Whetton	173	5.4	−2.2
Green	Jonathan Rummery	131	4.1	−1.7
Majority		277	8.6	−4.4
Turnout		3,233	25.6	
Labour hold		Swing	-2.2	

=== Rusholme ===
Rusholme
Party	Candidate	Votes	%	±%
Labour	Zafar Mir	1,153	45.3	+1.7
Liberal Democrats	Paul Shannon	1,122	44.1	+12.1
Conservative	Karen Abbad	152	6.0	−3.1
Green	Bernard Ekbery	119	4.7	+1.3
Majority		31	1.2	−10.4
Turnout		2,546	21.4	
Labour hold		Swing	-5.2	

=== Sharston ===
Sharston
Party	Candidate	Votes	%	±%
Labour	Joyce Keller*	905	71.8	−1.6
Conservative	John Nelson	181	14.4	+3.6
Liberal Democrats	Karen Farnen	136	10.8	−5.0
Green	Steven Anderson	38	3.0	+3.0
Majority		724	57.5	−5.1
Turnout		1,260	16.7	
Labour hold		Swing	-2.6	

=== Whalley Range ===
Whalley Range
Party	Candidate	Votes	%	±%
Labour	Paul Cruthers	1,456	50.4	−1.0
Liberal Democrats	Sadek Hamid	664	23.0	+5.9
Conservative	John Kershaw	626	21.7	+0.4
Socialist Labour	Steven Wynn	142	4.9	−0.2
Majority		792	27.4	−2.7
Turnout		2,888	28.9	
Labour hold		Swing	-3.4	

=== Withington ===
Withington
Party	Candidate	Votes	%	±%
Liberal Democrats	Brendon Jones	1,793	57.4	−3.8
Labour	Andrew Simcock*	990	31.7	+2.7
Conservative	Jonathan Smith	181	5.8	−1.2
Green	Jane Hutchings	162	5.2	+5.2
Majority		803	25.7	−6.5
Turnout		3,126	26.0	
Liberal Democrats gain from Labour		Swing	-3.2	

=== Woodhouse Park ===
Woodhouse Park
Party	Candidate	Votes	%	±%
Labour	Brian O'Neil*	969	77.3	+5.1
Liberal Democrats	Anthony McGarr	142	11.3	−16.5
Conservative	Bessie O'Connor	142	11.3	+11.3
Majority		827	66.0	+21.6
Turnout		1,253	15.9	
Labour hold		Swing	+10.8	

== By-elections between 1999 and 2000 ==
Benchill By-Election 10 June 1999
Party	Candidate	Votes	%	±%
Labour	Isobel Freeman	730	54.2	−25.5
Liberal Democrats	Ann Bradshaw	529	39.3	+28.1
Conservative	Brian Birchenough	88	6.5	−2.6
Majority		201	14.9	−53.6
Turnout		1,347	18.3	+4.7
Labour hold		Swing	-26.8	

Central By-Election 26 August 1999
Party	Candidate	Votes	%	±%
Labour	James Battle	758	50.1	−11.0
Liberal Democrats	Marc Ramsbottom	675	44.6	+18.2
Conservative	Nicholas Davis	57	3.8	−4.5
Green	William Kearns	24	1.6	−2.6
Majority		83	5.5	−29.2
Turnout		1,514	18.0	+4.8
Labour hold		Swing	-14.6	
