= 1987 Manchester City Council election =

1987 UK local government election

- 7 May 1987

33 of 99 seats to Manchester City Council 50 seats needed for a majority
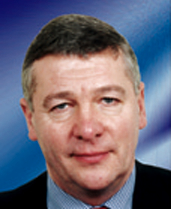
	First party	Second party	Third party
Leader	Graham Stringer	Joyce Hill	David Sandiford
Party	Labour	Conservative	Alliance
Leader's seat	Harpurhey	Didsbury	Withington
Last election	31 seats, 58.1%	1 seats, 20.3%	2 seats, 19.3%
Seats before	86	7	6
Seats won	19	9	5
Seats after	77	13	9
Seat change	▼9	▲6	▲3
Popular vote	62,473	43,168	40,343
Percentage	42.0%	29.0%	27.1%
Swing	▼16.1%	▲8.7%	▲7.8%
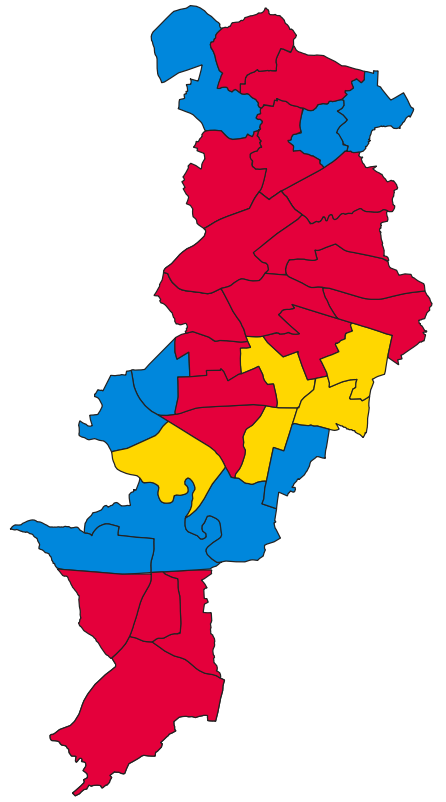
- Map of results of 1987 election
Leader of the Council before election
Graham Stringer
Labour
Leader of the Council after election
Graham Stringer
Labour

Elections to Manchester Council were held on Thursday, 7 May 1987. One third of the council was up for election, with each successful candidate to serve a four-year term of office, expiring in 1991. The Labour Party retained overall control of the Council.

== Election result ==
Party	Votes		Seats			Full Council	
Labour Party	62,473 (42.0%)	▼16.1	19 (57.6%)	19 / 33	▼9	77 (77.7%)	77 / 99
Conservative Party	43,168 (29.0%)	▲8.7	9 (27.3%)	9 / 33	▲6	13 (13.1%)	13 / 99
Alliance	40,343 (27.1%)	▲7.8	5 (15.1%)	5 / 33	▲3	9 (9.1%)	9 / 99
Green Party	1,775 (1.2%)	▲0.4	0 (0.0%)	0 / 33	Steady	0 (0.0%)	0 / 99
Independent	840 (0.5%)	▼0.6	0 (0.0%)	0 / 33	Steady	0 (0.0%)	0 / 99

↓
77	9	13

== Ward results ==
=== Ardwick ===
Ardwick
Party	Candidate	Votes	%	±%
Labour	Norman Finley*	1,825	67.0	−9.5
Liberal	Ronald Axtell	460	16.9	+9.3
Conservative	Steven Johnson	438	16.1	+0.2
Majority		1,365	50.1	−10.4
Turnout		2,723		
Labour hold		Swing	-9.4	

=== Baguley ===
Baguley
Party	Candidate	Votes	%	±%
Labour	Winifred Smith*	1,923	42.1	−31.2
Conservative	Simon Lawley	1,582	34.6	+7.9
SDP	Desmond Cooke	1,065	23.3	+23.3
Majority		341	7.5	−39.2
Turnout		4,570		
Labour hold		Swing	-19.5	

=== Barlow Moor ===
Barlow Moor
Party	Candidate	Votes	%	±%
SDP	Simon Gluck	2,305	42.5	+10.6
Labour	Christopher Tucker*	1,886	34.8	−11.9
Conservative	Nicholas Brook	1,110	20.5	+2.4
Green	Brian Candeland	126	2.3	−1.0
Majority		419	7.7	−7.1
Turnout		5,427		
SDP gain from Labour		Swing	+11.2	

=== Benchill ===
Benchill
Party	Candidate	Votes	%	±%
Labour	Neil Warren*	2,022	62.6	−9.8
Liberal	Ann Bradshaw	1,207	37.4	+37.4
Majority		815	25.2	−28.2
Turnout		3,229		
Labour hold		Swing	-23.6	

=== Beswick and Clayton ===
Beswick and Clayton
Party	Candidate	Votes	%	±%
Labour	Sidney Silverman*	1,867	56.2	−17.8
Conservative	Leonard Hockey	885	26.6	+12.4
SDP	Valerie Cahill	572	17.2	+11.9
Majority		982	29.5	−30.4
Turnout		3,324		
Labour hold		Swing	-15.1	

=== Blackley ===
Blackley
Party	Candidate	Votes	%	±%
Labour	Eileen Kelly*	1,879	45.2	−20.4
Conservative	Kevin Potter	1,366	32.9	+12.4
SDP	John Cookson	910	21.9	+9.4
Majority		513	12.3	−32.8
Turnout		4,155		
Labour hold		Swing	-16.4	

=== Bradford ===
Bradford
Party	Candidate	Votes	%	±%
Labour	Margaret Smith	2,048	61.9	−16.9
Liberal	Simon Lewis	650	19.6	+10.5
Conservative	Margaret Payne	610	18.4	+6.3
Majority		1,398	42.3	−24.4
Turnout		3,308		
Labour hold		Swing	-13.7	

=== Brooklands ===
Brooklands
Party	Candidate	Votes	%	±%
Conservative	Arthur O'Connor	2,646	50.0	+13.7
Labour	Paul Clarke*	1,714	32.4	−16.2
Liberal	David Wraxall	935	17.7	+2.6
Majority		932	17.6	+5.4
Turnout		5,295		
Conservative gain from Labour		Swing	+14.9	

=== Burnage ===
Burnage
Party	Candidate	Votes	%	±%
Conservative	Jeffrey Leach	2,231	40.2	+15.3
Labour	Marilyn Taylor*	1,992	35.9	−12.9
SDP	Robert Harrison	1,231	22.2	+7.0
Green	Edwin Howard	90	1.6	+0.1
Majority		239	4.3	
Turnout		5,544		
Conservative gain from Labour		Swing	+14.1	

=== Central ===
Central
Party	Candidate	Votes	%	±%
Labour	Patricia Conquest*	1,511	67.9	−11.7
Conservative	Alan Hudson	364	16.4	+5.0
SDP	Graeme Muir	351	15.8	+6.8
Majority		1,147	51.5	−16.6
Turnout		2,226		
Labour hold		Swing	-8.3	

=== Charlestown ===
Charlestown
Party	Candidate	Votes	%	±%
Labour	Valerie Edwards	1,933	41.2	−22.3
Conservative	Michael Jones	1,766	37.7	+14.4
SDP	Eric Watts	990	21.1	+8.0
Majority		167	3.6	−36.6
Turnout		4,689		
Labour hold		Swing	-18.3	

=== Cheetham ===
Cheetham
Party	Candidate	Votes	%	±%
Labour	Nicholas Harris*	1,452	52.3	−27.6
Independent	Sydney Laserson	727	26.2	+26.2
SDP	Barry McColgan	596	21.5	+1.4
Majority		725	26.1	−33.7
Turnout		2,775		
Labour hold		Swing	-26.9	

=== Chorlton ===
Chorlton
Party	Candidate	Votes	%	±%
Conservative	Daniel Kielthy	2,887	44.4	+6.4
Labour	Philip Openshaw	2,132	32.8	−15.4
Liberal	Margaret Boyle	1,287	19.8	+6.7
Green	Marian Daltrop	200	3.1	+3.1
Majority		755	11.6	+1.4
Turnout		6,506		
Conservative hold		Swing	+10.9	

=== Crumpsall ===
Crumpsall
Party	Candidate	Votes	%	±%
Conservative	Roger Bullock	2,178	45.1	+14.1
Labour	Basil Curley*	1,764	36.5	−13.2
SDP	Harry Blease	776	16.1	−3.2
Independent	Robert Lomas	113	2.3	+2.3
Majority		414	8.6	−10.0
Turnout		4,831		
Conservative gain from Labour		Swing	+13.6	

=== Didsbury ===
Didsbury
Party	Candidate	Votes	%	±%
Conservative	Muriel Crawford*	3,635	54.3	+10.9
Labour	Geoffrey Bridson	1,495	22.3	−9.7
SDP	Ann Muir	1,346	20.1	−2.6
Green	Michael Abberton	223	3.3	+1.3
Majority		2,140	31.9	+20.5
Turnout		6,699		
Conservative hold		Swing	+10.3	

=== Fallowfield ===
Fallowfield
Party	Candidate	Votes	%	±%
Labour	Michael Harrison	1,720	41.9	−12.7
Conservative	Stephen Keegin	1,434	35.0	+13.8
SDP	Kevin Read	789	19.2	−0.7
Green	Jonathan Booty	158	3.9	−0.4
Majority		286	7.0	−26.3
Turnout		4,101		
Labour hold		Swing	-13.2	

=== Gorton North ===
Gorton North
Party	Candidate	Votes	%	±%
Labour	Anne Unwin	2,078	45.4	−22.9
SDP	Paul Allanson	1,294	28.3	+14.2
Conservative	Noel Dentith	1,203	26.3	+9.8
Majority		784	17.1	−34.7
Turnout		4,575		
Labour hold		Swing	-18.5	

=== Gorton South ===
Gorton South
Party	Candidate	Votes	%	±%
Liberal	James Ashley	2,291	49.1	+17.8
Labour	Bernard Stone	1,814	38.9	−18.7
Conservative	Terence Grimshaw	557	11.9	+0.9
Majority		477	10.2	−16.1
Turnout		4,662		
Liberal gain from Labour		Swing	+18.2	

=== Harpurhey ===
Harpurhey
Party	Candidate	Votes	%	±%
Labour	Nilofar Siddiqi*	1,648	47.0	−23.4
Conservative	Reginald Chadwick	1,060	30.2	+15.9
SDP	Morris Lockwood	797	22.7	+7.4
Majority		588	16.8	−38.3
Turnout		3,505		
Labour hold		Swing	-19.6	

=== Hulme ===
Hulme
Party	Candidate	Votes	%	±%
Labour	Mary Kelly	1,859	72.8	−8.8
Liberal	Simon Jones	694	27.2	+17.5
Majority		1,165	45.6	−27.3
Turnout		2,553		
Labour hold		Swing	-13.1	

=== Levenshulme ===
Levenshulme
Party	Candidate	Votes	%	±%
Liberal	Audrey Greaves*	2,974	55.4	+2.1
Labour	Vincent Young	1,474	27.5	−4.3
Conservative	Victoria Colledge	741	13.8	+1.3
Green	Beryl Clarke	178	3.3	+1.0
Majority		1,500	27.9	+6.5
Turnout		5,367		
Liberal hold		Swing	+3.2	

=== Lightbowne ===
Lightbowne
Party	Candidate	Votes	%	±%
Conservative	Gerry Carey	2,035	38.6	+15.5
Labour	Derek Shaw*	1,855	35.2	−27.9
Liberal	David Porter	1,385	26.3	+12.5
Majority		180	3.4	−36.6
Turnout		5,275		
Conservative gain from Labour		Swing	+21.7	

=== Longsight ===
Longsight
Party	Candidate	Votes	%	±%
Labour	Kenneth Strath*	2,837	60.1	−3.3
SDP	Rosalind Moss	905	19.2	−2.5
Conservative	Ian Ferguson	830	17.6	+6.3
Green	Robert Waters	151	3.2	−0.4
Majority		1,932	40.9	−0.9
Turnout		4,723		
Labour hold		Swing	-0.4	

=== Moss Side ===
Moss Side
Party	Candidate	Votes	%	±%
Labour	Sam Darby*	2,653	70.1	−10.5
Conservative	Mary Barnes	605	16.0	+5.7
Liberal	Graham Shaw	527	13.9	+4.8
Majority		2,048	54.1	−16.2
Turnout		3,785		
Labour hold		Swing	-8.1	

=== Moston ===
Moston
Party	Candidate	Votes	%	±%
Conservative	John Clough	2,223	43.2	+17.8
Labour	William Risby*	1,906	37.1	−19.0
Liberal	David Gordon	1,013	19.7	+9.5
Majority		317	6.2	−24.4
Turnout		5,142		
Conservative gain from Labour		Swing	+18.4	

=== Newton Heath ===
Newton Heath
Party	Candidate	Votes	%	±%
Labour	Alan Wood	1,977	56.2	−17.5
Conservative	Jacqueline Hughes	854	24.3	+6.4
Liberal	Vera Towers	685	19.5	+12.8
Majority		1,123	31.9	−24.0
Turnout		3,516		
Labour hold		Swing	-11.9	

=== Northenden ===
Northenden
Party	Candidate	Votes	%	±%
Conservative	Anne Carroll	2,027	37.0	+10.3
Labour	Gabrielle Cox	1,714	31.3	−28.0
Liberal	Michael Otterwell	1,679	30.6	+16.6
Green	Sylvia Buchan	61	1.1	+1.1
Majority		313	5.7	−26.9
Turnout		5,481		
Conservative gain from Labour		Swing	+19.1	

=== Old Moat ===
Old Moat
Party	Candidate	Votes	%	±%
Labour	Keith Bradley*	2,309	38.0	−13.0
Liberal	Anne Monkhouse	2,120	34.9	+11.6
Conservative	Maura Logan	1,523	25.1	+2.8
Green	Joyce Foster	127	2.1	−1.2
Majority		189	3.1	−24.6
Turnout		6,079		
Labour hold		Swing	-12.3	

=== Rusholme ===
Rusholme
Party	Candidate	Votes	%	±%
Liberal	Marc Ramsbottom	2,310	46.0	+5.5
Labour	Yomi Mambu*	1,969	39.2	−7.9
Conservative	Nigel Barnes	594	11.8	+1.4
Green	Alison Hunt	149	3.0	+3.0
Majority		341	6.8	+0.2
Turnout		5,022		
Liberal gain from Labour		Swing	+6.7	

=== Sharston ===
Sharston
Party	Candidate	Votes	%	±%
Labour	George Mann	1,801	38.5	−26.0
SDP	Robert Bowers	1,585	33.9	−1.6
Conservative	Alan Williams	1,292	27.6	+27.6
Majority		216	4.6	−24.5
Turnout		4,678		
Labour hold		Swing	-12.2	

=== Whalley Range ===
Whalley Range
Party	Candidate	Votes	%	±%
Conservative	John Kershaw	2,294	42.7	+9.1
Labour	Yousouf Gooljary	2,075	38.6	−11.1
SDP	Kenneth McKeon	856	15.9	−0.8
Green	Colin Kirby	149	2.8	+2.8
Majority		219	4.1	−12.0
Turnout		5,374		
Conservative hold		Swing	+10.1	

=== Withington ===
Withington
Party	Candidate	Votes	%	±%
Liberal	David Sandiford*	2,631	44.9	+2.3
Labour	David Silkin	1,614	27.5	−7.4
Conservative	Anthony Elleray	1,457	24.8	+5.3
Green	Guy Otten	163	2.8	−0.2
Majority		1,017	17.3	+9.6
Turnout		5,865		
Liberal hold		Swing	+4.8	

=== Woodhouse Park ===
Woodhouse Park
Party	Candidate	Votes	%	±%
Labour	May Bullows	1,727	48.0	−7.8
SDP	Eileen Dawes	1,127	31.3	+16.0
Conservative	Dorothy Hurst	741	20.6	+12.3
Majority		600	16.7	−18.5
Turnout		3,595		
Labour hold		Swing	-11.9	

== By-elections between 1987 and 1988 ==
=== By-elections 20 August 1987 ===
Two by-elections were held on 20 August 1987 to fill vacancies which had arisen in the city council.

==== Gorton South ====
Caused by the resignation of Councillor Neil Litherland (Labour, Gorton South, elected 3 May 1984) on 13 July 1987.

Gorton South
Party	Candidate	Votes	%	±%
Liberal	John Bridges	1,859	53.4	+4.3
Labour	Bernard Stone	1,228	35.3	−3.6
Conservative	Stephen Keegin	350	10.1	−1.8
Green	Paul Reeves	44	1.3	N/A
Majority		631	18.1	+7.9
Turnout		3,481		
Liberal gain from Labour		Swing		

==== Northenden ====
Caused by the resignation of Councillor Keith Barnes (Labour, Northenden, elected 6 May 1982) on 13 May 1987.

Northenden
Party	Candidate	Votes	%	±%
Conservative	Bernard Slamon	2,080	56.5	+19.5
Labour	William Risby	1,234	33.5	+2.2
Liberal	David Wraxall	318	8.6	−22.0
Green	Sylvia Buchan	52	1.4	+0.3
Majority		846	22.0	+17.3
Turnout		3,684		
Conservative gain from Labour		Swing		
