= Fallowfield (ward) =

- Ward
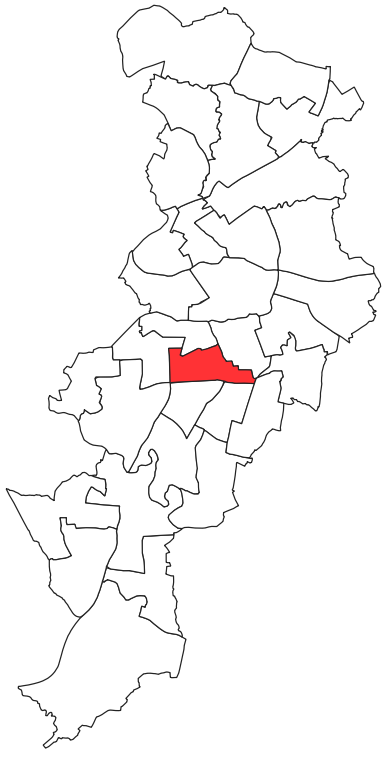
- Fallowfield ward (2018) within Manchester

- Coat of arms
- Country: United Kingdom
- Constituent country: England
- Region: North West England
- County: Greater Manchester
- Metropolitan borough: Manchester
- Created: May 1982
- Named for: Fallowfield

Government
  - Type: Unicameral
  - Body: Manchester City Council
- UK Parliamentary Constituency: Manchester Rusholme

Fallowfield is an electoral division of Manchester City Council which has been represented since 1982. It covers the South Manchester suburb of Fallowfield.

== Overview ==
Fallowfield ward was created in 1982, covering the southern portions of the former Lloyd Street ward and the Rusholme ward. In 2004, a section of the ward south of Alexandra Park was transferred to the Whalley Range ward. At the latest revision in 2018, the ward's western boundary became Princess Road and its eastern boundary was extended to the Styal Line.

From its creation until 1983, the ward was divided between the Manchester Ardwick and Manchester Moss Side Parliamentary constituencies. Between 1983 and 2024, it was part of the Manchester Gorton Parliamentary constituency. Since 2024, it has formed part of the Manchester Rusholme Parliamentary constituency.

== Councillors ==
Election	Councillor	Councillor	Councillor
1982	P. Morrison (Lab)	J. Holly (Lab)	P. Openshaw (Lab)
1983	P. Morrison (Lab)	J. Holly (Lab)	P. Openshaw (Lab)
1984	P. Morrison (Lab)	R. Graham (Lab)	P. Openshaw (Lab)
1986	P. Morrison (Lab)	R. Graham (Lab)	P. Openshaw (Lab)
1987	P. Morrison (Lab)	R. Graham (Lab)	M. Harrison (Lab)
1988	P. Morrison (Lab)	R. Graham (Lab)	M. Harrison (Lab)
1990	P. Morrison (Lab)	R. Graham (Lab)	M. Harrison (Lab)
1991	P. Morrison (Lab)	R. Graham (Lab)	R. N. Y. Khan (Lab)
1992	P. Morrison (Lab)	S. Done (Lab)	R. N. Y. Khan (Lab)
1994	P. Morrison (Lab)	S. Done (Lab)	R. N. Y. Khan (Lab)
1995	P. Morrison (Lab)	D. Royle (Lab)	B. Reid (Lab)
1996	P. Morrison (Lab)	D. Royle (Lab)	B. Reid (Lab)
1998	P. Morrison (Lab)	D. Royle (Lab)	B. Reid (Lab)
1999	P. Morrison (Lab)	D. Royle (Lab)	B. Reid (Lab)
2000	P. Morrison (Lab)	D. Royle (Lab)	B. Reid (Lab)
2002	P. Morrison (Lab)	D. Royle (Lab)	B. Reid (Lab)
2003	P. Morrison (Lab)	D. Royle (Lab)	B. Reid (Lab)
2004	David Royle (Lab)	Peter Morrison (Lab)	John-Paul Wilkins (Lib Dem)
2006	David Royle (Lab)	Peter Morrison (Lab)	Mike Amesbury (Lab)
2007	David Royle (Lab)	Peter Morrison (Lab)	Mike Amesbury (Lab)
2008	David Royle (Lab)	Peter Morrison (Lab)	Mike Amesbury (Lab)
2010	David Royle (Lab)	Peter Morrison (Lab)	Mike Amesbury (Lab)
2011	David Royle (Lab)	Grace Fletcher-Hackwood (Lab)	Mike Amesbury (Lab)
2012	David Royle (Lab)	Grace Fletcher-Hackwood (Lab)	Mike Amesbury (Lab)
2014	David Royle (Lab)	Peter Morrison (Lab)	Mike Amesbury (Lab)
2015	David Royle (Lab)	Grace Fletcher-Hackwood (Lab)	Mike Amesbury (Lab)
2016	Zahrah Alijah (Lab)	Grace Fletcher-Hackwood (Lab)	Mike Amesbury (Lab)
July 2017	Zahrah Alijah (Lab)	Grace Fletcher-Hackwood (Lab)	Ali Ilyas (Lab)
2018	Grace Fletcher-Hackwood (Lab)	Zahra Alijah (Lab)	Ali Ilyas (Lab)
2019	Ali Ilyas (Lab)	Zahra Alijah (Lab)	Jade Doswell (Lab)
2021	Ali Ilyas (Lab)	Zahra Alijah (Lab)	Jade Doswell (Lab)
2022	Ali Ilyas (Lab)	Zahra Alijah (Lab)	Jade Doswell (Lab)
2023	Ali Ilyas (Lab)	Zahra Alijah (Lab)	Jade Doswell (Lab)
2024	Ali Ilyas (Lab)	Ghazala Sadiq (Lab)	Jade Doswell (Lab)
2026	Sufyaan Jasat (Grn)	Ghazala Sadiq (Lab)	Jade Doswell (Lab)

== Elections ==
=== Elections in 2020s ===
==== May 2026 ====
2026
Party	Candidate	Votes	%	±%
Green	Sufyaan Jasat	1,328	52.0	+37.0
Labour	Ali Ilyas*	710	27.8	−43.2
Reform	Racheal Burns	293	11.5	N/A
Conservative	Luke Barker	105	4.1	−3.0
Liberal Democrats	John Commons	79	3.1	−2.9
Workers Party	Raluca Khajeh	37	1.4	N/A
Majority		618	24.2	N/A
Turnout		2,552	25.8	+10.6
Green gain from Labour		Swing		

==== May 2024 ====
2024
Party	Candidate	Votes	%	±%
Labour	Ghazala Sadiq*	1,136	53.1	18.0 ▼
Green	Albie Mayo	338	15.8	0.4 ▲
Workers Party	Chowdhury Murtahin Billah	331	15.5	New
Liberal Democrats	Lynne Williams	196	9.2	5.1 ▲
Conservative	Sabreena Zareen Hossain	113	5.3	4.1 ▼
Majority		798	37.3	
Rejected ballots		27	1.3	
Turnout		2,141	21.21	
Registered electors		10,094		
Labour hold		Swing	9.2 ▼	

==== May 2023 ====
2023
Party	Candidate	Votes	%	±%
Labour	Jade Doswell*	1,290	73.8	▲10.4
Green	Charlie O'Brian	216	12.4	▼5.1
Conservative	Sabneena Hossain	134	7.7	▲2.6
Liberal Democrats	Lynne Williams	108	6.2	▼2.4
Majority		1,074	61.4	▲18.6
Rejected ballots				
Turnout		1,748	18.35	▲1.8
Registered electors		9,596		
Labour hold		Swing		

==== May 2022 ====
2022
Party	Candidate	Votes	%	±%
Labour	Ali Ilyas*	1,157	71.0	3.1 ▼
Green	Hannah Charter	245	15.0	1.5 ▼
Conservative	Sabreena Hossain	116	7.1	0.4 ▲
Liberal Democrats	Paul Jones	98	6.0	3.7 ▼
Majority		912	56.0	
Rejected ballots		13		
Turnout		1,616	15.2	1.8 ▼
Registered electors		10,706		
Labour hold		Swing	0.8 ▼	

==== May 2021 ====
2021
Party	Candidate	Votes	%	±%
Labour	Zahra Alijah*	1,583	71.1	7.0 ▼
Green	George Morris	342	15.4	9.2 ▲
Conservative	Sabreena Hossain	209	9.4	2.7 ▲
Liberal Democrats	Paul Jones	92	4.1	5.0 ▼
Majority		1,241	55.7	
Rejected ballots		23	1.0	
Turnout		2,249	19.78	2.8 ▲
Registered electors		11,394		
Labour hold		Swing	8.1 ▼	

=== Elections in 2020s ===
==== May 2019 ====
2019 (2 vacancies)
Party	Candidate	Votes	%	±%
Labour	Jade Doswell	1,279	65.1	▼4.7
Labour	Ali R. Ilyas*	1,213	61.7	▼0.5
Green	Lottie Donovan	371	18.9	▲2.4
Green	Anne Power	315	16.0	▼0.5
Liberal Democrats	Lauren Coleman-Bennett	191	9.7	▲1.6
Liberal Democrats	Jamie Dwan	148	7.5	▼0.6
Conservative	Mike Hannon	111	5.6	▼0.4
Conservative	Rory Tinker	92	4.7	▼1.2
Majority		842	42.8	▼2.9
Rejected ballots		25	1.27	
Turnout		1,965	16.55	▼0.4
Registered electors		11,879		
Labour hold		Swing	▼3.75	
Labour hold		Swing		

==== May 2018 ====
2018 (3 vacancies; new boundaries)
Party	Candidate	Votes	%	±%
Labour	Grace Fletcher-Hackwood*	1,627	74.1	
Labour	Zahra Alijah*	1,608	73.3	
Labour	Ali Ilyas*	1,366	62.2	
Green	Adrian Thompson	363	16.5	
Liberal Democrats	Robin Grayson	213	9.7	
Liberal Democrats	Gemma Kilday	162	7.4	
Liberal Democrats	Jem Arpa	159	7.2	
Conservative	Nathan Denham	147	6.7	
Conservative	Rory Tinker	130	5.9	
Conservative	Adam Goldfine	118	5.4	
Majority				
Turnout		2,195	17	
Labour win (new boundaries)				
Labour win (new boundaries)				
Labour win (new boundaries)				

==== July 2017 (by-election) ====
By-election: 27 July 2017
Party	Candidate	Votes	%	±%
Labour	Ali Raza Ilyas	861	76.9	+15.3
Green	Adam Philip King	105	9.4	−12.6
Liberal Democrats	Alex Warren	82	7.3	+3.4
Conservative	David Robert Semple	72	6.4	−3.8
Majority		756	67.4	
Turnout		1,122	9.36	
Labour hold		Swing		

==== May 2016 ====
2016
Party	Candidate	Votes	%	±%
Labour	Zahra Alijah	1,932	71.2	−6.7
Green	Laura Alice Bannister	408	15.0	+6.1
Conservative	Luke Aidan Dyks	197	7.3	+0.8
Liberal Democrats	Christopher Jones	125	4.6	+1.0
TUSC	Aidan Ryan Matthews	53	2.0	−1.2
Majority		1,524	56.1	
Turnout		2,715	24.74	
Labour hold		Swing		

==== May 2015 ====
2015
Party	Candidate	Votes	%	±%
Labour	Grace Fletcher-Hackwood*	3,617	60.3	−8.8
Green	Laura Alice Bannister	1,367	22.8	+11.6
Conservative	Jack Murray	661	11.0	+0.2
Liberal Democrats	Sarah Louise Brown	269	4.5	−1.7
TUSC	Zoe Brunswick	86	1.4	−1.2
Majority		2,250	37.5	
Turnout		6,000	56.9	+28.3
Labour hold		Swing		

==== May 2014 ====
2014
Party	Candidate	Votes	%	±%
Labour	Mike Amesbury*	2,181	61.56	+30.57
Green	Catrin Louise Brock	780	22.02	+17.11
Conservative	Jack Murray	362	10.22	−1.44
Liberal Democrats	Dave Page	140	3.95	−29.13
TUSC	Zoe Frances Brunswick	80	2.26	N/A
Majority		1,401	39.5	
Turnout		3,543	30.62	
Labour hold		Swing		

==== May 2012 ====
2012
Party	Candidate	Votes	%	±%
Labour	David Royle*	1,733	77.9	+26.5
Green	Rosie Dammers	198	8.9	−0.1
Conservative	Charles Bailey	144	6.5	−5.0
Liberal Democrats	Ronan Stafford	80	3.6	−24.5
TUSC	Katen Verma	70	3.2	N/A
Majority		1,535	69	
Turnout		2,225	19.4	
Labour hold		Swing		

==== May 2011 ====
2011
Party	Candidate	Votes	%	±%
Labour	Grace Fletcher-Hackwood	2,167	69.1	+13.2
Green	Rebecca Simpson	351	11.2	−0.4
Conservative	Nick Kling	340	10.8	+0.2
Liberal Democrats	Saira Sadaf	196	6.2	−15.8
TUSC	Katen Verma	83	2.6	N/A
Majority		1,816	57.9	
Turnout		3,137	28.6	
Labour hold		Swing		

==== May 2010 ====
2010
Party	Candidate	Votes	%	±%
Labour Co-op	Mike Amesbury*	2,534	48.0	−3.4
Liberal Democrats	Dave Page	1,716	32.5	+4.4
Conservative	Nick Kling	746	14.1	+2.6
Green	Daniel Benjamin Lee	286	5.4	−3.6
Majority		818	15.5	−7.9
Turnout		5,282	50.3	+27.5
Labour hold		Swing	-3.9	

=== Elections in 2020s ===
==== May 2008 ====
2008
Party	Candidate	Votes	%	±%
Labour	David Royle*	1,178	51.4	−4.5
Liberal Democrats	Kas Afzal	643	28.1	+6.1
Conservative	Colin Power	263	11.5	+0.9
Green	Daniel Lee	207	9.0	−2.6
Majority		535	23.4	−10.5
Turnout		2,291	22.8	+2.8
Labour hold		Swing	-5.3	

==== May 2007 ====
2007
Party	Candidate	Votes	%	±%
Labour	Peter Morrison*	1,215	55.9	+9.5
Liberal Democrats	John-Paul Wilkins	478	22.0	−15.2
Green	Rachel Sills	251	11.6	+5.9
Conservative	Ashton Cull	230	10.6	+4.7
Majority		737	33.9	+24.6
Turnout		2,174	20.0	−8.1
Labour hold		Swing	+12.3	

==== May 2006 ====
2006
Party	Candidate	Votes	%	±%
Labour	Mike Amesbury	1,357	46.4	+4.1
Liberal Democrats	John-Paul Wilkins*	1,086	37.2	+0.6
Conservative	Cedric Beniston	171	5.9	−3.8
Green	Susan Somerville	168	5.7	−5.7
BNP	Joseph Gerard Marjella Finnon	140	4.8	+4.8
Majority		271	9.3	+3.5
Turnout		2,922	28.1	−2.4
Labour gain from Liberal Democrats		Swing	+1.7	

==== June 2004 ====
2004 (3 vacancies; new boundaries)
Party	Candidate	Votes	%	±%
Labour	David Royle*	1,233	39.7	
Labour	Peter Morrison*	1,121	36.1	
Liberal Democrats	John-Paul Wilkins	1,066	34.3	
Liberal Democrats	Paul Ankers	1,064	34.2	
Liberal Democrats	Rob Brettle	1,036	33.3	
Labour	Mike Amesbury	1,005	32.3	
Green	Bruce Bingham	331	10.6	
Green	Bernard Ekbery	299	9.6	
Green	Peter Dungey	294	9.5	
Conservative	Craig Lewel	283	9.1	
Conservative	Ahsanul Awan	269	8.7	
Conservative	David Vila	254	8.2	
Majority		2	0.1	
Turnout		3,108	30.5	
Labour win (new seat)				
Labour win (new seat)				
Liberal Democrats win (new seat)				

==== May 2003 ====
2003
Party	Candidate	Votes	%	±%
Labour	Bernice Reid*	853	48.3	−11.9
Liberal Democrats	John-Paul Wilkins	494	28.0	+9.0
Conservative	William Langton	239	13.5	+1.0
Green	Bruce Bingham	180	10.2	+2.0
Majority		359	20.3	−20.9
Turnout		1,766	15.0	−2.3
Labour hold		Swing	-10.4	

==== May 2002 ====
2002
Party	Candidate	Votes	%	±%
Labour	Peter Morrison*	1,238	60.2	−2.1
Liberal Democrats	Howard Totty	391	19.0	+5.7
Conservative	Simon Davenport	257	12.5	−4.4
Green	Bruce Bingham	169	8.2	+0.7
Majority		847	41.2	−4.2
Turnout		2,055	17.3	+3.5
Labour hold		Swing	-3.9	

==== May 2000 ====
2000
Party	Candidate	Votes	%	±%
Labour	David Royle*	1,013	62.3	+3.3
Conservative	Simon Davenport	275	16.9	+1.8
Liberal Democrats	Lynne Williams	217	13.3	−6.6
Green	Hannah Berry	122	7.5	+2.5
Majority		738	45.4	+6.3
Turnout		1,627	13.8	+0.2
Labour hold		Swing	+0.7	

=== Elections in 1990s ===
==== May 1999 ====
1999
Party	Candidate	Votes	%	±%
Labour	Bernice Reid*	1,005	59.0	+5.6
Liberal Democrats	Shakeel Ahmed	339	19.9	+4.1
Conservative	David Saville	257	15.1	−0.6
Green	Hannah Berry	85	5.0	+0.1
Independent Labour	Thomas Kelly	17	1.0	−5.4
Majority		666	39.1	+1.6
Turnout		1,703	13.6	
Labour hold		Swing	+0.7	

==== May 1998 ====
1998
Party	Candidate	Votes	%	±%
Labour	Peter Morrison*	900	53.4	−16.5
Liberal Democrats	David Hennigan	267	15.8	+5.4
Conservative	Simon Davenport	265	15.7	+2.2
Independent Labour	Tommy Kelly	108	6.4	+6.4
Green	Micheal Daw	83	4.9	−1.4
Socialist Labour	Paul Hepburn	63	3.7	+3.7
Majority		633	37.5	−18.9
Turnout		1,686		
Labour hold		Swing	-10.9	

==== May 1996 ====
1996
Party	Candidate	Votes	%	±%
Labour	David Royle*	1,584	69.9	+12.0
Conservative	Simon Davenport	306	13.5	+1.5
Liberal Democrats	James Graham	235	10.4	−0.2
Green	Michael Daw	142	6.3	−4.3
Majority		1,278	56.4	+10.5
Turnout		2,267		
Labour hold		Swing	+5.2	

==== May 1995 ====
1995 (2 vacancies)
Party	Candidate	Votes	%	±%
Labour	Bernice Reid	1,519	57.9	−5.7
Labour	David Royle	1,462		
Conservative	Simon Davenport	314	12.0	−2.8
Liberal Democrats	Robert Harrison	277	10.6	−2.2
Green	Micheal Daw	277	10.6	+5.9
Conservative	P. Newlove	268		
Independent	E. Fiander	234	8.9	+8.0
Liberal Democrats	Howard Totty	234		
Independent	P. Williamson	114		
Majority		1,205	45.9	−2.9
Turnout		2,621		
Labour hold		Swing		
Labour hold		Swing	-1.4	

==== May 1994 ====
1994
Party	Candidate	Votes	%	±%
Labour	P. Morrison*	1,824	63.6	+7.4
Conservative	J. Nelson	425	14.8	−12.2
Liberal Democrats	S. Ord	367	12.8	−4.2
Green	M. Daw	134	4.7	+4.7
Independent	S. King	92	3.2	+3.2
Independent	A. Fiander	27	0.9	+0.9
Majority		1,399	48.8	+19.6
Turnout		2,869		
Labour hold		Swing	+9.8	

==== May 1992 ====
1992
Party	Candidate	Votes	%	±%
Labour	S. Done	1,329	56.2	+5.3
Conservative	J. Nelson	638	27.0	−0.9
Liberal Democrats	B. Jones	396	17.0	+4.5
Majority		691	29.2	+6.2
Turnout		2,363		
Labour hold		Swing	+3.1	

==== May 1991 ====
1991
Party	Candidate	Votes	%	±%
Labour	R. N. Y. Khan	1,624	50.9	−7.5
Conservative	D. Smith	890	27.9	+8.0
Liberal Democrats	B. Jones	399	12.5	+3.3
Green	M. J. Daw	278	8.7	−3.8
Majority		734	23.0	−15.5
Turnout		3,191	29.1	
Labour hold		Swing	-7.7	

==== May 1990 ====
1990
Party	Candidate	Votes	%	±%
Labour	P. Morrison*	2,440	58.4	+7.4
Conservative	D. Smith	830	19.9	−9.1
Green	B. J. A. Doherty	524	12.5	+7.9
Liberal Democrats	R. G. Brown	386	9.2	+4.6
Majority		1,610	38.5	+16.6
Turnout		4,180		
Labour hold		Swing	+8.2	

=== Elections in 1980s ===
==== May 1988 ====
1988
Party	Candidate	Votes	%	±%
Labour	R. A. Graham*	2,054	51.0	+9.1
Conservative	S. W. Keegin	1,170	29.0	−6.0
SLD	E. A. Cross	622	15.4	−3.8
Green	J. Sturrock	184	4.6	+0.7
Majority		884	21.9	+14.9
Turnout		4,030		
Labour hold		Swing	+7.5	

==== May 1987 ====
1987
Party	Candidate	Votes	%	±%
Labour	Michael Harrison	1,720	41.9	−12.7
Conservative	Stephen Keegin	1,434	35.0	+13.8
SDP	Kevin Read	789	19.2	−0.7
Green	Jonathan Booty	158	3.9	−0.4
Majority		286	7.0	−26.3
Turnout		4,101		
Labour hold		Swing	-13.2	

==== May 1986 ====
1986
Party	Candidate	Votes	%	±%
Labour	P. Morrison*	2,180	54.6	+0.6
Conservative	S. Keegin	848	21.2	−13.6
SDP	G. Nevins	794	19.9	+8.7
Green	R. Waters	173	4.3	+4.3
Majority		1,332	33.3	+14.1
Turnout		3,995		
Labour hold		Swing	+7.1	

==== May 1984 ====
1984
Party	Candidate	Votes	%	±%
Labour	Rhona Graham	2,122	54.0	+5.9
Conservative	George Taylor	1,368	34.8	−3.5
SDP	George Nevins	439	11.2	−2.3
Majority		754	19.2	+9.4
Turnout		3,929		
Labour hold		Swing	+4.7	

==== May 1983 ====
1983
Party	Candidate	Votes	%	±%
Labour	Philip Openshaw*	1,993	48.1	+7.5
Conservative	John Hardman	1,587	38.3	+4.5
SDP	George Nevins	560	13.5	−12.0
Majority		406	9.8	+3.0
Turnout		4,140		
Labour hold		Swing	+1.5	

==== May 1982 ====
1982 (3 vacancies)
Party	Candidate	Votes	%	±%
Labour	Peter Morrison	1,696	39.1	
Labour	Joseph Holly	1,649	38.0	
Labour	Philip Openshaw	1,574	36.3	
Conservative	Paul Hackett	1,412	32.6	
Conservative	George Taylor	1,363	31.4	
Conservative	John Hardman	1,342	31.0	
SDP	Robert Davison	1,067	24.6	
SDP	James Bradley*	1,062	24.5	
SDP	Kenneth McKeon*	1,016	23.4	
Majority		162	3.7	
Turnout		4,335	38.5	
Labour win (new seat)				
Labour win (new seat)				
Labour win (new seat)				

== See also ==
- Manchester City Council
- Manchester City Council elections
