= Benchill (ward) =

Ward in Manchester, England

- Ward
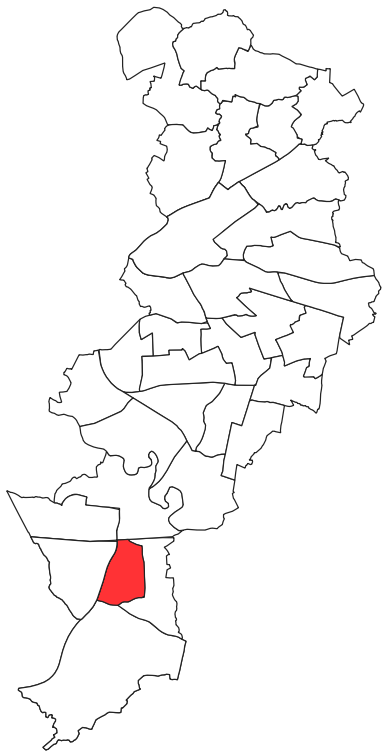
- Benchill (1994) within Manchester

- Coat of arms
- Country: United Kingdom
- Constituent country: England
- Region: North West England
- County: Greater Manchester
- Metropolitan borough: Manchester
- Created: May 1954, May 1982
- Named for: Benchill

Government
  - Type: Unicameral
  - Body: Manchester City Council
- UK Parliamentary Constituency: Manchester Wythenshawe

Benchill was an electoral division of Manchester City Council which was represented from 1954 until 1971, and again from 1982 until 2004. It covered the Benchill area of Wythenshawe.

== Overview ==
Benchill ward was created in 1954, following the City Council's successful application to create two new wards for the Wythenshawe estate. The ward covered the eastern portion of the former Wythenshawe ward and inherited its councillors. In 1971, the ward was abolished and its area was divided between the new Crossacres ward and Northenden ward.

After a city-wide boundary revision in 1982, the ward was revived. It would continue to cover the Benchill area until it was abolished again in 2004.

During both periods of its existence, the ward formed part of the Manchester Wythenshawe Parliamentary constituency.

== Councillors ==
Election	Councillor	Councillor	Councillor
1954	H. S. Gatley (Lab)	H. Lloyd (Lab)	W. Frost (Lab)
1955	H. S. Gatley (Lab)	H. Lloyd (Lab)	W. Frost (Lab)
1956	H. S. Gatley (Lab)	H. Lloyd (Lab)	R. L. Griffiths (Lab)
1957	H. S. Gatley (Lab)	H. Lloyd (Lab)	R. L. Griffiths (Lab)
1958	H. S. Gatley (Lab)	H. Lloyd (Lab)	R. L. Griffiths (Lab)
1959	H. S. Gatley (Lab)	H. Lloyd (Lab)	R. L. Griffiths (Lab)
1960	H. S. Gatley (Lab)	H. Lloyd (Lab)	A. Williamson (Con)
1961	H. S. Gatley (Lab)	D. L. Cooke (Con)	A. Williamson (Con)
1962	H. S. Gatley (Lab)	D. L. Cooke (Con)	A. Williamson (Con)
1963	H. S. Gatley (Lab)	D. L. Cooke (Con)	J. Hussey (Lab)
1964	H. S. Gatley (Lab)	H. Brown (Lab)	J. Hussey (Lab)
1965	B. B. Williams (Con)	H. Brown (Lab)	J. Hussey (Lab)
1966	B. B. Williams (Con)	H. Brown (Lab)	N. Pritchard (Con)
1967	B. B. Williams (Con)	A. A. O'Connor (Con)	N. Pritchard (Con)
1968	B. B. Williams (Con)	A. A. O'Connor (Con)	N. Pritchard (Con)
1969	B. B. Williams (Con)	A. A. O'Connor (Con)	N. Pritchard (Con)
1970	B. B. Williams (Con)	R. L. Griffiths (Lab)	N. Pritchard (Con)
Ward abolished (1971-1982)
1982	A. Home (Lab)	V. Myers (Lab)	N. Warren (Lab)
1983	A. Home (Lab)	V. Myers (Lab)	N. Warren (Lab)
1984	A. Home (Lab)	V. Myers (Lab)	N. Warren (Lab)
1986	A. Home (Lab)	V. Myers (Lab)	N. Warren (Lab)
1987	A. Home (Lab)	V. Myers (Lab)	N. Warren (Lab)
1988	A. Home (Lab)	V. Myers (Lab)	N. Warren (Lab)
1990	D. Lunts (Lab)	V. Myers (Lab)	N. Warren (Lab)
1991	D. Lunts (Lab)	V. Myers (Lab)	N. Warren (Lab)
1992	D. Lunts (Lab)	V. Myers (Lab)	N. Warren (Lab)
1994	A. Harding (Lab)	V. Myers (Lab)	N. Warren (Lab)
1995	A. Harding (Lab)	V. Myers (Lab)	N. Warren (Lab)
1996	A. Harding (Lab)	V. Myers (Lab)	N. Warren (Lab)
1998	A. Harding (Lab)	V. Myers (Lab)	N. Warren (Lab)
1999	A. Harding (Lab)	V. Myers (Lab)	N. Warren (Lab)
June 1999	I. Freeman (Lab)	V. Myers (Lab)	N. Warren (Lab)
2000	I. Freeman (Lab)	V. Myers (Lab)	N. Warren (Lab)
2002	I. Freeman (Lab)	V. Myers (Lab)	N. Warren (Lab)
June 2002	I. Freeman (Lab)	I. Wilmott (Lab)	N. Warren (Lab)
2003	R. Unwin (Lab)	I. Wilmott (Lab)	T. Cross (Lab)

== Elections ==
=== Elections in 1950s ===
==== May 1954 ====
1954
Party	Candidate	Votes	%	±%
Labour	W. Frost*	3,115	57.2	−6.1
Conservative	A. Williamson	2,206	40.5	+6.7
Communist	G. Taylor	125	2.3	N/A
Majority		909	16.7	−12.8
Turnout		5,446		
Labour hold		Swing		

==== May 1955 ====
1955
Party	Candidate	Votes	%	±%
Labour	H. Lloyd*	2,606	51.6	−5.6
Conservative	J. H. Prince	2,304	45.6	+5.1
Communist	G. Taylor	142	2.8	+0.5
Majority		302	6.0	−10.7
Turnout		5,052		
Labour hold		Swing		

==== May 1956 ====
1956 (2 vacancies)
Party	Candidate	Votes	%	±%
Labour	H. S. Gatley*	2,467	57.9	+6.3
Labour	R. L. Griffiths	2,357	55.3	+3.7
Conservative	R. Clarkson	1,665	39.0	−6.6
Conservative	E. Birley	1,658	38.9	−6.7
Communist	G. Taylor	190	4.5	+1.7
Majority		692	16.2	+10.2
Turnout		4,264		
Labour hold		Swing		
Labour hold		Swing		

==== May 1957 ====
1957
Party	Candidate	Votes	%	±%
Labour	R. L. Griffiths*	2,710	58.6	+0.7
Conservative	E. Birley	1,911	41.4	+2.4
Majority		799	17.2	+1.0
Turnout		4,621		
Labour hold		Swing		

==== May 1958 ====
1958
Party	Candidate	Votes	%	±%
Labour	H. Lloyd*	2,456	59.1	+0.5
Conservative	E. Birley	1,623	39.1	−2.3
Communist	G. Taylor	75	1.8	N/A
Majority		833	20.0	+2.8
Turnout		4,154		
Labour hold		Swing		

==== May 1959 ====
1959
Party	Candidate	Votes	%	±%
Labour	H. S. Gatley*	2,414	50.5	−8.6
Conservative	A. Williamson	2,225	46.5	+7.4
Communist	M. Taylor	141	3.0	+1.2
Majority		189	4.0	−16.0
Turnout		4,780		
Labour hold		Swing		

=== Elections in 1960s ===
==== May 1960 ====
1960
Party	Candidate	Votes	%	±%
Conservative	A. Williamson	2,441	49.9	+3.4
Labour	R. L. Griffiths*	2,339	47.8	−2.7
Communist	M. Taylor	116	2.3	−0.7
Majority		102	2.1	
Turnout		4,896		
Conservative gain from Labour		Swing		

==== May 1961 ====
1961
Party	Candidate	Votes	%	±%
Conservative	D. L. Cooke	2,813	49.5	−0.4
Labour	H. Lloyd*	2,747	48.4	+0.6
Communist	M. Taylor	118	2.1	−0.2
Majority		66	1.1	−1.0
Turnout		5,678		
Conservative gain from Labour		Swing		

==== May 1962 ====
1962
Party	Candidate	Votes	%	±%
Labour	H. S. Gatley*	3,303	51.8	+3.4
Conservative	B. Moore	1,890	29.6	−19.9
Liberal	J. Glithero	1,037	16.3	N/A
Communist	M. Taylor	151	2.3	+0.2
Majority		1,413	22.1	
Turnout		6,381		
Labour hold		Swing		

==== May 1963 ====
1963
Party	Candidate	Votes	%	±%
Labour	J. Hussey	3,445	52.6	+0.8
Conservative	A. Williamson*	1,974	30.1	+0.5
Liberal	J. Glithero	1,023	15.6	−0.7
Communist	M. Taylor	110	1.7	−0.6
Majority		1,471	22.5	+0.4
Turnout		6,552		
Labour gain from Conservative		Swing		

==== May 1964 ====
1964
Party	Candidate	Votes	%	±%
Labour	H. Brown	2,304	46.7	−5.9
Conservative	D. L. Cooke*	2,013	40.8	+10.7
Liberal	J. Glithero	523	10.6	−5.0
Communist	M. Taylor	96	1.9	+0.2
Majority		291	5.9	−16.6
Turnout		4,936		
Labour gain from Conservative		Swing		

==== May 1965 ====
1965
Party	Candidate	Votes	%	±%
Conservative	B. B. Williams	2,828	49.3	+8.5
Labour	A. A. Smith*	2,399	41.9	−4.8
Liberal	H. Horton	382	6.7	−3.9
Communist	M. Taylor	122	2.1	+0.2
Majority		429	7.4	
Turnout		5,731		
Conservative gain from Labour		Swing		

==== May 1966 ====
1966
Party	Candidate	Votes	%	±%
Conservative	N. Pritchard	2,630	50.4	+1.1
Labour	J. Hussey*	2,467	47.3	+5.4
Communist	M. Taylor	123	2.3	+0.2
Majority		163	3.1	−4.3
Turnout		5,220		
Conservative gain from Labour		Swing		

==== May 1967 ====
1967
Party	Candidate	Votes	%	±%
Conservative	A. A. O'Connor	2,839	58.4	+8.0
Labour	H. Brown*	1,933	39.7	−7.6
Communist	M. Taylor	93	1.9	−0.4
Majority		906	18.7	+15.6
Turnout		4,865		
Conservative gain from Labour		Swing		

==== May 1968 ====
1968
Party	Candidate	Votes	%	±%
Conservative	B. B. Williams*	3,112	61.4	+3.0
Labour	R. L. Griffiths	1,815	35.8	−3.9
Communist	M. Taylor	142	2.8	+0.9
Majority		1,297	25.6	+6.9
Turnout		5,069		
Conservative hold		Swing		

==== May 1969 ====
1969
Party	Candidate	Votes	%	±%
Conservative	N. Pritchard*	2,921	59.6	−1.8
Labour	R. L. Griffiths	1,860	38.0	+2.2
Communist	M. Taylor	120	2.4	−0.4
Majority		1,061	21.6	−4.0
Turnout		4,901		
Conservative hold		Swing		

=== Elections in 1970s ===
==== May 1970 ====
1970
Party	Candidate	Votes	%	±%
Labour	R. L. Griffiths	3,188	53.0	+15.0
Conservative	Y. I. Emery	2,716	45.2	−14.4
Communist	M. Taylor	107	1.8	−0.6
Majority		472	7.9	
Turnout		6,011		
Labour gain from Conservative		Swing		

=== Elections in 1980s ===
==== May 1982 ====
1982 (3 vacancies)
Party	Candidate	Votes	%	±%
Labour	Alfred Home	2,136	58.8	
Labour	Veronica Myers	2,125	58.5	
Labour	Neil Warren	2,050	56.4	
Liberal	Herbert Griffiths	827	22.8	
Liberal	Gilbert Stacey	751	20.7	
Liberal	Bridget Brannan	679	18.7	
Conservative	Valerie Corrigan	460	12.7	
Conservative	David Harrington	437	12.0	
Conservative	Tracey Dennett	422	11.6	
Majority		1,223	33.7	
Turnout		3,634	35.9	
Labour win (new seat)				
Labour win (new seat)				
Labour win (new seat)				

==== May 1983 ====
1983
Party	Candidate	Votes	%	±%
Labour	Neil Warren*	2,579	72.1	+9.7
Conservative	Mirjam Malbon	554	15.5	+2.0
Liberal	Gilbert Stacey	443	12.4	−11.8
Majority		2,025	56.6	+7.6
Turnout		3,576		
Labour hold		Swing	+3.8	

==== May 1984 ====
1984
Party	Candidate	Votes	%	±%
Labour	Veronica Myers*	2,147	75.7	+3.6
Conservative	Gladys Parry	425	15.0	−0.5
Liberal	Gilbert Stacey	264	9.3	−3.1
Majority		1,722	60.7	+4.1
Turnout		2,836		
Labour hold		Swing	+2.0	

==== May 1986 ====
1986
Party	Candidate	Votes	%	±%
Labour	A. Home*	2,157	72.4	−3.3
Independent	A. Bradshaw	567	19.0	+19.0
Conservative	D. Hurst	256	16.1	+1.1
Majority		1,590	53.4	−7.3
Turnout		2,980		
Labour hold		Swing	-11.1	

==== May 1987 ====
1987
Party	Candidate	Votes	%	±%
Labour	Neil Warren*	2,022	62.6	−9.8
Liberal	Ann Bradshaw	1,207	37.4	+37.4
Majority		815	25.2	−28.2
Turnout		3,229		
Labour hold		Swing	-23.6	

==== May 1988 ====
1988
Party	Candidate	Votes	%	±%
Labour	V. M. Myers*	1,735	60.0	−2.6
Independent	D. A. Morris	482	16.7	+16.7
SLD	A. Bradshaw	407	14.1	−23.3
Conservative	W. F. Hurst	267	9.2	+9.2
Majority		1,253	43.3	+18.1
Turnout		2,891		
Labour hold		Swing	-9.6	

=== Elections in 1990s ===
==== May 1990 ====
1990
Party	Candidate	Votes	%	±%
Labour	D. Lunts	2,147	71.9	+11.9
Independent	D. A. Morris	327	10.9	−5.8
Conservative	L. G. Maguire	213	7.1	−2.1
Liberal Democrats	A. Bradshaw	204	6.8	−7.3
Green	H. F. Bramwell	96	3.2	+3.2
Majority		1,820	60.9	+17.6
Turnout		2,987		
Labour hold		Swing	+8.8	

==== May 1991 ====
1991
Party	Candidate	Votes	%	±%
Labour	N. Warren*	1,714	71.8	−0.1
Liberal Democrats	A. Bradshaw	349	14.6	+7.8
Conservative	C. Roberts	323	13.5	+6.4
Majority		1,365	57.2	−3.7
Turnout		2,386	28.4	
Labour hold		Swing	-3.8	

==== May 1992 ====
1992
Party	Candidate	Votes	%	±%
Labour	V. Myers*	979	67.8	−4.0
Conservative	T. Roberts	311	21.5	+8.0
Liberal Democrats	M. Dunn	154	10.7	−3.9
Majority		668	46.3	−10.9
Turnout		1,444		
Labour hold		Swing	-6.0	

==== May 1994 ====
1994
Party	Candidate	Votes	%	±%
Labour	A. Harding	1,620	71.1	+3.3
Communist (ML)	L. Worthington	294	12.9	+12.9
Liberal Democrats	J. Redmond	228	10.0	−0.7
Conservative	M. Joyce	138	6.1	−15.4
Majority		1,326	58.2	+11.9
Turnout		2,280		
Labour hold		Swing	-4.8	

==== May 1995 ====
1995
Party	Candidate	Votes	%	±%
Labour	Niel Warren*	1,455	86.1	+15.0
Liberal Democrats	Janice Redmond	189	11.2	+1.2
Independent	J. Pickering	45	2.7	+2.7
Majority		1,266	75.0	+16.8
Turnout		1,689		
Labour hold		Swing	+6.9	

==== May 1996 ====
1996
Party	Candidate	Votes	%	±%
Labour	Veronica Myers*	1,037	77.7	−8.4
Liberal Democrats	Janice Redmond	124	9.3	−1.9
Conservative	Carol Roberts	101	7.6	+7.6
Socialist	T. Jefferies	72	5.4	+5.4
Majority		913	68.4	−6.6
Turnout		1,334		
Labour hold		Swing	-3.2	

==== May 1998 ====
1998
Party	Candidate	Votes	%	±%
Labour	George Harding*	791	76.1	−1.6
Liberal Democrats	Janice Redmond	178	17.1	+7.8
Conservative	Anthony Green	70	6.7	−0.9
Majority		613	60.0	−8.4
Turnout		1,039		
Labour hold		Swing	-4.7	

==== May 1999 ====
1999
Party	Candidate	Votes	%	±%
Labour	Niel Warren*	790	79.7	+3.6
Liberal Democrats	Janice Redmond	111	11.2	−5.9
Conservative	Brian Birchenough	90	9.1	+2.4
Majority		679	68.5	+8.5
Turnout		991	13.6	
Labour hold		Swing	+4.7	

==== June 1999 (by-election) ====
By-election: 10 June 1999
Party	Candidate	Votes	%	±%
Labour	Isobel Freeman	730	54.2	−25.5
Liberal Democrats	Ann Bradshaw	529	39.3	+28.1
Conservative	Brian Birchenough	88	6.5	−2.6
Majority		201	14.9	−53.6
Turnout		1,347	18.3	+4.7
Labour hold		Swing	-26.8	

=== Elections in 2000s ===
==== May 2000 ====
2000
Party	Candidate	Votes	%	±%
Labour	Veronica Myers*	556	69.3	−10.4
Liberal Democrats	Ann Bradshaw	109	13.6	+2.4
Conservative	Carol Roberts	99	12.3	+3.2
Socialist Labour	Paul Arnold	25	3.1	+3.1
Green	Roy Snape	13	1.6	+1.6
Majority		447	55.7	−12.8
Turnout		802	11.7	−1.9
Labour hold		Swing	-6.4	

==== May 2002 ====
2002
Party	Candidate	Votes	%	±%
Labour	Isobel Freeman*	765	69.9	+0.6
Liberal Democrats	Ann Bradshaw	165	15.1	+1.5
Conservative	Joyce Kaye	109	10.0	−2.3
Green	Hannah Berry	56	5.1	+3.5
Majority		600	54.8	−0.9
Turnout		1,095	15.4	+3.7
Labour hold		Swing	-0.4	

==== June 2002 (by-election) ====
By-election: 13 June 2002
Party	Candidate	Votes	%	±%
Labour	Ian Wilmott	440	70.5	+0.6
Liberal Democrats	Ann Bradshaw	85	13.6	−1.5
Conservative	Adrian Hutchinson	67	10.7	+0.7
Socialist Labour	Mervyn Drage	32	5.1	+5.1
Majority		355	56.9	+2.1
Turnout		624	8.8	−6.6
Labour hold		Swing	+1.0	

==== May 2003 ====
2003 (2 vacancies)
Party	Candidate	Votes	%	±%
Labour	Tony Cross	592	70.4	+0.5
Labour	Richard Unwin	564		
Liberal Democrats	William Fisher	102	12.1	−3.0
Conservative	Joyce Kaye	85	10.1	+0.1
Conservative	Carol Roberts	82		
Liberal Democrats	Richard Vann	67		
Green	Peter Powell	62	7.4	+2.3
Green	Stephen Walford	50		
Majority		462	58.3	+3.5
Turnout		841	12.8	−2.6
Labour hold		Swing		
Labour hold		Swing	+1.7	

== See also ==
- Manchester City Council
- Manchester City Council elections
