= Benchill =

Area of Greater Manchester, England

Coordinates: 53.38855°N 2.26309°W

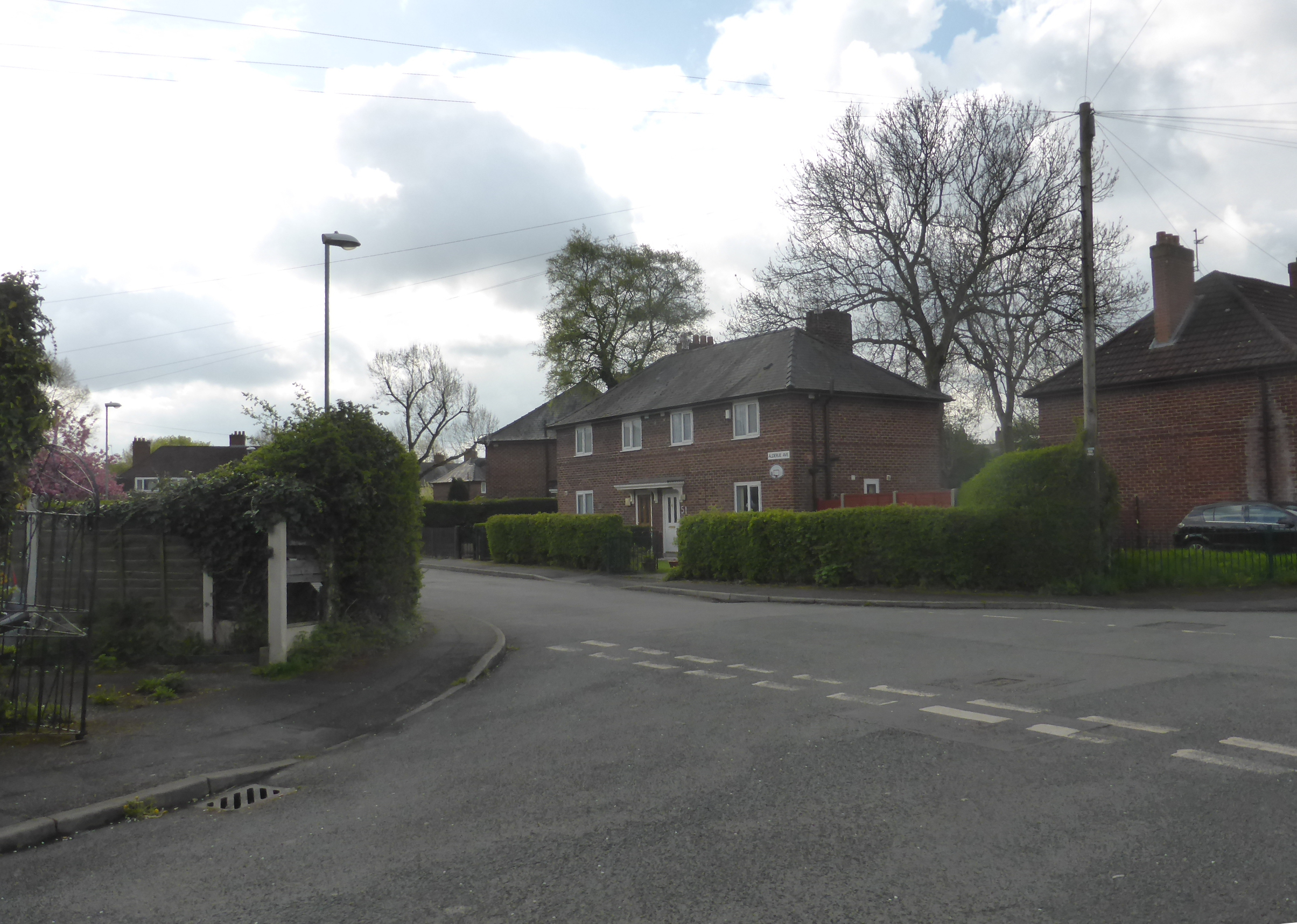
Alderue Avenue, Benchill

Benchill is an area in the Wythenshawe council estate 8 miles (13 km) south of Manchester city centre, in England.

In 2000, Benchill was named in the Index of Multiple Deprivation as the most deprived ward in England.

Following a review by the Boundary Committee for England, Benchill was disestablished as a local government ward in 2003, and the area divided between the neighbouring wards of Sharston, Woodhouse Park, and Northenden.

Benchill gained national media attention in February 2007 when then-Leader of the Opposition David Cameron visited the estate and was targeted by a group of youths, one of whom made a gun gesture with his hand towards him. The incident was photographed by the press.

== Services ==
Benchill tram stop, on the Airport Line, opened in 2014.

Benchill is policed by the Wythenshawe Neighbourhood Policing Team.
