= Harpurhey (ward) =

- Ward
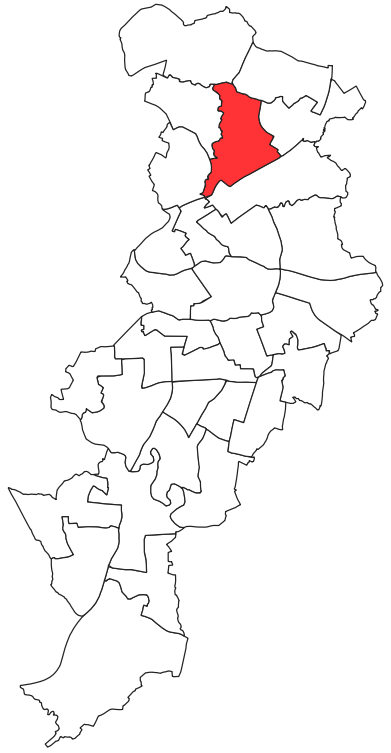
- Harpurhey ward (2018) within Manchester

- Coat of arms
- Country: United Kingdom
- Constituent country: England
- Region: North West England
- County: Greater Manchester
- Metropolitan borough: Manchester
- Created: November 1885
- Named for: Harpurhey

Government
  - Type: Unicameral
  - Body: Manchester City Council
- UK Parliamentary Constituency: Blackley and Middleton South

Harpurhey is an electoral division of Manchester City Council which has been represented since 1885. It covers the North Manchester suburb of Harpurhey.

== Overview ==
Harpurhey ward was created in 1885, following the Manchester City Extension Act 1885, which transferred the townships of Bradford, Harpurhey, and Rusholme to the Manchester corporation. Initially the ward covered the newly incorporated township of Harpurhey as well as that part of the existing St. Michael's ward to the north of Collyhurst Street. Boundary revisions in 1919 removed the southern portion of the ward to create a new Collyhurst ward, its boundaries were mostly unaffected by a further boundary revision in 1950. In 1971, the ward incorporated parts of the former Hugh Oldham ward and parts of the Miles Platting and Newton Heath wards to the west of the junction of the Caldervale and Huddersfield lines. In 1982, the ward's south eastern boundary became the Caldervale line, following another boundary revision in 2004, the ward incorporated the western portion of the former Lightbowne ward. At the latest revision in 2018, that part of the Cheetham and Crumpsall wards to the east of the River Irk were transferred to the ward.

From its creation until 1918, the ward formed part of the Manchester North Parliamentary constituency. From 1918 until 1950, it was part of the Manchester Platting Parliamentary constituency. From 1950 until 1974, it was part of the Manchester Cheetham Parliamentary constituency. From 1974 until 1983, it was part of the Manchester Central Parliamentary constituency. From 1983 until 2024, it was part of the Manchester Blackley Parliamentary constituency. From 2010 until 2024, it was part of the Blackley and Broughton Parliamentary constituency. Since 2024, it has formed part of the Blackley and Middleton South Parliamentary constituency.

== Councillors ==
Election	Councillor	Councillor	Councillor
1885	G. Needham (Con)	W. Sherratt (Lib)	J. Richards (Con)
1886	G. Needham (Con)	W. Sherratt (Lib)	J. Richards (Con)
1887	G. Needham (Con)	W. Sherratt (Lib)	J. Richards (Con)
1888	G. Needham (Con)	W. Sherratt (Lib)	J. Richards (Con)
1889	G. Needham (Con)	W. Sherratt (Lib)	J. Richards (Con)
1890	G. Needham (Con)	W. Sherratt (Lib)	J. Richards (Con)
1891	G. Needham (Con)	W. Sherratt (Lib)	J. Richards (Con)
1892	G. Needham (Con)	W. Sherratt (Lib)	J. Richards (Con)
1893	G. Needham (Con)	W. Sherratt (Lib)	J. Richards (Con)
1894	G. Needham (Con)	W. Sherratt (Lib)	J. Richards (Con)
1895	G. Needham (Con)	W. Sherratt (Lib)	J. Richards (Con)
1896	G. Needham (Con)	G. W. Chadwick (Con)	J. Richards (Con)
1897	F. Brocklehurst (ILP)	G. W. Chadwick (Con)	J. Richards (Con)
July 1897	F. Brocklehurst (ILP)	G. W. Chadwick (Con)	P. Whyman (Lib)
1898	F. Brocklehurst (ILP)	G. W. Chadwick (Con)	P. Whyman (Lib)
1899	F. Brocklehurst (ILP)	J. Faulkner (Con)	P. Whyman (Lib)
1900	F. Brocklehurst (Lab)	J. Faulkner (Con)	P. Whyman (Lib)
1901	F. Brocklehurst (Lab)	J. Faulkner (Con)	P. Whyman (Lib)
1902	F. Brocklehurst (Lab)	W. Holden (Con)	P. Whyman (Lib)
1903	W. T. Jackson (Lab)	W. Holden (Con)	P. Whyman (Lib)
1904	W. T. Jackson (Lab)	W. Holden (Con)	P. Whyman (Lib)
1905	W. T. Jackson (Lab)	W. Holden (Con)	P. Whyman (Lib)
1906	J. Hargreaves (Con)	W. Holden (Con)	P. Whyman (Lib)
1907	J. Hargreaves (Con)	W. Holden (Con)	W. T. Jackson (Lab)
1908	J. Hargreaves (Con)	W. Holden (Con)	W. T. Jackson (Lab)
1909	J. Hargreaves (Con)	W. Holden (Con)	W. T. Jackson (Lab)
1910	J. Hargreaves (Con)	W. Holden (Con)	W. T. Jackson (Lab)
1911	J. Hargreaves (Con)	W. Holden (Con)	W. T. Jackson (Lab)
1912	J. Hargreaves (Con)	W. Holden (Con)	W. T. Jackson (Lab)
1913	J. Hargreaves (Con)	W. Holden (Con)	W. T. Jackson (Lab)
November 1913	T. McRoy (Con)	W. Holden (Con)	W. T. Jackson (Lab)
1914	T. McRoy (Con)	W. Holden (Con)	W. T. Jackson (Lab)
October 1918	T. McRoy (Con)	W. Gilgryst (Con)	J. Whelan (NFDDSS)
1919	R. Lundy (Lab)	W. Gilgryst (Con)	J. Whelan (NFDDSS)
1920	R. Lundy (Lab)	W. Gilgryst (Con)	T. Hoyle (Con)
1921	R. Lundy (Lab)	W. Gilgryst (Con)	T. Hoyle (Con)
1922	R. Lundy (Lab)	W. Gilgryst (Con)	T. Hoyle (Con)
1923	R. Lundy (Lab)	W. Gilgryst (Con)	T. Hoyle (Con)
1924	R. Lundy (Lab)	W. Gilgryst (Con)	T. Hoyle (Con)
1925	R. Lundy (Lab)	W. Gilgryst (Con)	T. Hoyle (Con)
1926	R. Lundy (Lab)	W. Gilgryst (Con)	J. Howard (Lab)
1927	R. Lundy (Lab)	W. Onions (Lab)	J. Howard (Lab)
1928	R. Lundy (Lab)	W. Onions (Lab)	J. Howard (Lab)
1929	R. Lundy (Lab)	W. Onions (Lab)	J. Howard (Lab)
1930	R. Lundy (Lab)	C. F. Howarth (Con)	J. Howard (Lab)
1931	F. Sutton (Con)	C. F. Howarth (Con)	J. Howard (Lab)
February 1932	E. Shields (Con)	C. F. Howarth (Con)	J. Howard (Lab)
1932	E. Shields (Con)	C. F. Howarth (Con)	J. Howard (Lab)
1933	E. Shields (Con)	C. F. Howarth (Con)	J. Howard (Lab)
1934	E. Barnacott (Lab)	C. F. Howarth (Con)	J. Howard (Lab)
1935	E. Barnacott (Lab)	C. F. Howarth (Con)	J. Howard (Lab)
1936	E. Barnacott (Lab)	C. F. Howarth (Con)	J. Howard (Lab)
1937	E. Barnacott (Lab)	C. F. Howarth (Con)	J. Howard (Lab)
1938	E. Barnacott (Lab)	C. F. Howarth (Con)	E. Shaw (Con)
1945	E. Barnacott (Lab)	H. P. J. Hinderer (Lab)	E. Shaw (Con)
1946	E. Barnacott (Lab)	H. P. J. Hinderer (Lab)	E. Shaw (Con)
March 1947	A. L. Mansfield (Con)	H. P. J. Hinderer (Lab)	E. Shaw (Con)
1947	A. L. Mansfield (Con)	H. P. J. Hinderer (Lab)	J. Chatterton (Con)
1949	A. L. Mansfield (Con)	H. P. J. Hinderer (Lab)	J. Chatterton (Con)
1950	E. Grant (Lab)	H. P. J. Hinderer (Lab)	J. Chatterton (Con)
1951	E. Grant (Lab)	H. P. J. Hinderer (Lab)	J. Chatterton (Con)
1952	E. Grant (Lab)	H. P. J. Hinderer (Lab)	J. Chatterton (Con)
1953	E. Grant (Lab)	H. P. J. Hinderer (Lab)	J. Chatterton (Con)
1954	E. Grant (Lab)	H. P. J. Hinderer (Lab)	A. O'Toole (Lab)
1955	E. Grant (Lab)	H. P. J. Hinderer (Lab)	A. O'Toole (Lab)
1956	E. Grant (Lab)	H. P. J. Hinderer (Lab)	A. O'Toole (Lab)
1957	E. Grant (Lab)	H. P. J. Hinderer (Lab)	A. O'Toole (Lab)
1958	E. Grant (Lab)	H. P. J. Hinderer (Lab)	A. O'Toole (Lab)
1959	E. Grant (Lab)	H. P. J. Hinderer (Lab)	A. O'Toole (Lab)
1960	E. Grant (Lab)	H. P. J. Hinderer (Lab)	A. O'Toole (Lab)
1961	E. Grant (Lab)	H. Waddicor (Lab)	A. O'Toole (Lab)
1962	E. Grant (Lab)	H. P. J. Hinderer (Lab)	A. O'Toole (Lab)
1963	E. Grant (Lab)	H. Waddicor (Lab)	A. O'Toole (Lab)
1964	E. Grant (Lab)	H. Waddicor (Lab)	A. O'Toole (Lab)
1965	E. Grant (Lab)	H. P. J. Hinderer (Lab)	A. O'Toole (Lab)
1966	E. Grant (Lab)	H. Waddicor (Lab)	A. O'Toole (Lab)
1967	E. Grant (Lab)	K. Allday (Con)	A. O'Toole (Lab)
1968	E. F. Thornhill (Con)	K. Allday (Con)	A. O'Toole (Lab)
1969	E. F. Thornhill (Con)	K. Allday (Con)	V. M. Taylor (Con)
1970	E. F. Thornhill (Con)	J. Holden (Con)	V. M. Taylor (Con)
1971	J. B. Ogden (Lab)	A. Nicholson (Lab)	S. N. M. Moxley (Lab)
July 1971	R. K. Litherland (Lab)	A. Nicholson (Lab)	S. N. M. Moxley (Lab)
1972	R. K. Litherland (Lab)	A. Nicholson (Lab)	S. N. M. Moxley (Lab)
1973	R. K. Litherland (Lab)	A. Nicholson (Lab)	R. F. Delahunty (Lab)
July 1974	R. K. Litherland (Lab)	H. Reid (Lab)	R. F. Delahunty (Lab)
1975	R. K. Litherland (Lab)	H. Reid (Lab)	R. F. Delahunty (Lab)
1976	R. K. Litherland (Lab)	H. Reid (Lab)	R. F. Delahunty (Lab)
1978	R. K. Litherland (Lab)	H. Reid (Lab)	R. F. Delahunty (Lab)
1979	R. K. Litherland (Lab)	H. Reid (Lab)	R. F. Delahunty (Lab)
1980	H. Reid (Lab)	A. Lister (Lab)	R. F. Delahunty (Lab)
1982	P. Karney (Lab)	G. Stringer (Lab)	N. Siddiqi (Lab)
1983	P. Karney (Lab)	G. Stringer (Lab)	N. Siddiqi (Lab)
1984	P. Karney (Lab)	G. Stringer (Lab)	N. Siddiqi (Lab)
1986	P. Karney (Lab)	G. Stringer (Lab)	N. Siddiqi (Lab)
1987	P. Karney (Lab)	G. Stringer (Lab)	N. Siddiqi (Lab)
1988	P. Karney (Lab)	G. Stringer (Lab)	N. Siddiqi (Lab)
1990	P. Karney (Lab)	G. Stringer (Lab)	N. Siddiqi (Lab)
1991	P. Karney (Lab)	G. Stringer (Lab)	N. Siddiqi (Lab)
1992	P. Karney (Lab)	G. Stringer (Lab)	N. Siddiqi (Lab)
1994	P. Karney (Lab)	G. Stringer (Lab)	N. Siddiqi (Lab)
1995	P. Karney (Lab)	G. Stringer (Lab)	N. Siddiqi (Lab)
1996	P. Karney (Lab)	G. Stringer (Lab)	N. Siddiqi (Lab)
1998	P. Karney (Lab)	J. Green (Lab)	N. Siddiqi (Lab)
1999	P. Karney (Lab)	J. Green (Lab)	N. Siddiqi (Lab)
2000	P. Karney (Lab)	J. Green (Lab)	N. Siddiqi (Lab)
2002	P. Karney (Lab)	J. Green (Lab)	N. Siddiqi (Lab)
2003	P. Karney (Lab)	J. Green (Lab)	P. Fairweather (Lab)
2004	Patrick Karney (Lab)	Joanne Green (Lab)	Paul Fairweather (Lab)
2006	Patrick Karney (Lab)	Joanne Green (Lab)	Paul Fairweather (Lab)
2007	Patrick Karney (Lab)	Joanne Green (Lab)	Paul Fairweather (Lab)
2008	Patrick Karney (Lab)	Joanne Green (Lab)	Paul Fairweather (Lab)
2010	Patrick Karney (Lab)	Joanne Green (Lab)	Paul Fairweather (Lab)
2011	Patrick Karney (Lab)	Joanne Green (Lab)	Paul Fairweather (Lab)
2012	Patrick Karney (Lab)	Joanne Green (Lab)	Paul Fairweather (Lab)
2014	Patrick Karney (Lab)	Joanne Green (Lab)	Sandra Collins (Lab)
2015	Patrick Karney (Lab)	Joanne Green (Lab)	Sandra Collins (Lab)
2016	Patrick Karney (Lab)	Joanne Green (Lab)	Sandra Collins (Lab)
2018	Sandra Collins (Lab)	Joanne Green (Lab)	Patrick Karney (Lab)
2019	Sandra Collins (Lab)	Joanne Green (Lab)	Patrick Karney (Lab)
2021	Sandra Collins (Lab)	Joanne Green (Lab)	Patrick Karney (Lab)
2022	Sandra Collins (Lab)	Joanne Green (Lab)	Patrick Karney (Lab)
2023	Sandra Collins (Lab)	Joanne Green (Lab)	Patrick Karney (Lab)
2024	Sandra Collins (Lab)	Joanne Green (Lab)	Patrick Karney (Lab)
2026	David Godfrey (Lab)	Joanne Green (Lab)	Patrick Karney (Lab)

== Elections ==
=== Elections in 2020s ===
==== November 2026 (by-election) ====
By-election: 26 November 2026
Party	Candidate	Votes	%	±%
Reform	Ian Carter			
Green	Sean Duggan			
Independent	Declan Gleeson			
Restore	James Harvie			
Conservative	Sarah Haynes			
Liberal Democrats	Peter Matthews			
Labour	Abdul Sarfraz			
Majority				
Turnout				
		Swing		

==== May 2026 ====
2026
Party	Candidate	Votes	%	±%
Labour	David Godfrey	1,135	37.8	−36.2
Reform	John David	788	26.3	N/A
Green	Finn White	735	24.5	+16.5
Conservative	Gareth Brown	210	7.0	−5.9
Liberal Democrats	Maria Turner	132	4.4	+0.2
Majority		347	11.6	−49.5
Turnout		3,000	22.4	+4.7
Labour hold		Swing		

==== May 2024 ====
2024
Party	Candidate	Votes	%	±%
Labour	Joanne Mary Green*	1,879	69.4	0.7 ▲
Conservative	Gareth Joseph Brown	300	11.1	7.1 ▼
Green	Jean Betteridge	294	10.9	2.7 ▲
Liberal Democrats	Celia Mary Craske	114	4.2	0.7 ▼
TUSC	Sam Hey	81	3.0	
Majority		1,579	58.3	
Rejected ballots		41	1.5	
Turnout		2,709	20.37	
Registered electors		13,296		
Labour hold		Swing	3.9 ▲	

==== May 2023 ====
2023
Party	Candidate	Votes	%	±%
Labour	Pat Karney*	1,715	72.1	▲9.0
Conservative	Gareth Brown	307	12.9	▲3.7
Green	Sam Cook	216	9.1	▲0.1
Liberal Democrats	Celia Craske	140	5.9	▲1.6
Majority		1,408	59.2	▲9.4
Rejected ballots				
Turnout		2,378	18.77	▼0.47
Registered electors		12,813		
Labour hold		Swing		

==== May 2022 ====
2022
Party	Candidate	Votes	%	±%
Labour	Sandra Collins*	1,667	74.0	2.5 ▲
Conservative	Gareth Brown	291	12.9	3.5 ▼
Green	Billie Nagle	181	8.0	3.5 ▼
Liberal Democrats	Celia Craske	95	4.2	n/a
Majority		1,376	61.1	
Rejected ballots		20		
Turnout		2,254	17.7	2.4 ▼
Registered electors		12,707		
Labour hold		Swing	3.0 ▲	

==== May 2021 ====
2021
Party	Candidate	Votes	%	±%
Labour	Joanne Green*	1,901	68.7	8.8 ▼
Conservative	Gareth Brown	503	18.2	2.1 ▲
Green	Vicky Matthews	228	8.2	3.7 ▲
Liberal Democrats	Celia Craske	136	4.9	New
Majority		1,398	50.5	
Rejected ballots		41	1.5	
Turnout		2,809	22.1	2.0 ▲
Registered electors		12,710		
Labour hold		Swing	5.5 ▼	

=== Elections in 2010s ===
==== May 2019 ====
2019
Party	Candidate	Votes	%	±%
Labour	Pat Karney*	1,510	63.1	▲4.1
UKIP	Michael Felse	319	13.3	n/a
Conservative	Gareth Brown	232	9.7	▼6.7
Green	Vicky Matthews	215	9.0	▼2.5
Liberal Democrats	Lynne Williams	102	4.3	n/a
Majority		1,191	49.8	▲7.2
Rejected ballots		15	0.63	
Turnout		2,393	19.24	▼0.8
Registered electors		12,445		
Labour hold		Swing	▼4.6	

==== May 2018 ====
2018 (3 vacancies; new boundaries)
Party	Candidate	Votes	%	±%
Labour	Sandra Collins*	1,773	71.5	
Labour	Joanne Green*	1,656	66.7	
Labour	Pat Karney*	1,464	59.0	
Conservative	Gareth Brown	408	16.4	
Conservative	Jodie Goldfine	329	13.3	
Green	Vicky Matthews	285	11.5	
Conservative	Ivor Levy	279	11.2	
TUSC	Jack Metcalf	118	4.8	
Majority				
Turnout		2,481	20.1	
Labour win (new boundaries)				
Labour win (new boundaries)				
Labour win (new boundaries)				

==== May 2016 ====
2016
Party	Candidate	Votes	%	±%
Labour	Patrick Charles Karney*	1,791	64.3	−11.9
UKIP	Mandy Michelle Howard	552	19.8	n/a
Conservative	Alexandru Stelian Stancu	166	6.0	−4.1
Green	Mary Rosalind Candeland	132	4.7	−4.5
Liberal Democrats	Rodney Alan Isherwood	102	3.7	−0.8
TUSC	Emma Windefride	42	1.5	n/a
Majority		1,239	44.5	
Turnout		2,785	23.50	
Labour hold		Swing		

==== May 2015 ====
2015
Party	Candidate	Votes	%	±%
Labour	Joanne Mary Green*	3,431	61.8	+11.4
UKIP	Angela Robinson	1,284	23.1	N/A
Conservative	Calum Turud James Davies	455	8.2	−2.7
Green	Christina Amy Alexandra Knox	229	4.1	N/A
Liberal Democrats	Charles William Turner	92	1.6	−3.4
TUSC	Fiona Jane Stephens	65	1.2	N/A
Majority		2,147	38.7	
Turnout		5,556	45.3	+21.1
Labour hold		Swing		

==== May 2014 ====
2014
Party	Candidate	Votes	%	±%
Labour	Sandra Collins	2,174	68.56	
Green	Mildred Willner	552	17.41	
Conservative	Tom Clarke	341	10.75	
Liberal Democrats	Bernadette Ryan	104	3.28	
Majority		1,622	51.2	
Turnout		3,171	25.3	
Labour hold		Swing		

==== May 2012 ====
2012
Party	Candidate	Votes	%	±%
Labour	Pat Karney*	1,890	76.2	+18.9
Conservative	William Clapham	250	10.1	−9.3
Green	Simon Gibbins	227	9.2	−1.8
Liberal Democrats	Mellissa Houlding	112	4.5	−7.8
Majority		1,640	66	
Turnout		2,479	20.24	
Labour hold		Swing		

==== May 2011 ====
2011
Party	Candidate	Votes	%	±%
Labour	Joanne Green*	2,151	73.2	+14.3
Conservative	William Clapham	321	10.9	−0.7
BNP	Peter Brown	320	10.9	N/A
Liberal Democrats	Dominic Hardwick	147	5.0	−9.0
Majority		1,830	62.3	
Turnout		2,939	24.2	
Labour hold		Swing		

==== May 2010 ====
2010
Party	Candidate	Votes	%	±%
Labour	Paul Fairweather*	3,054	60.0	+2.7
Liberal Democrats	Andi Sidwell	684	13.4	+1.1
BNP	Peter Brown	627	12.3	+12.3
Conservative	Martin James Rosen	587	11.5	−7.9
Green	Arteth Jean Gray	141	2.8	−8.2
Majority		2,370	46.5	+8.6
Turnout		5,093	42.1	+21.0
Labour hold		Swing	+0.8	

=== Elections in 2000s ===
==== May 2008 ====
2008
Party	Candidate	Votes	%	±%
Labour	Patrick Karney*	1,475	57.3	−1.6
Conservative	Will Palmer	500	19.4	+7.8
Liberal Democrats	Dave Page	317	12.3	−1.7
Green	Katherine Smith	283	11.0	+5.8
Majority		975	37.9	−7.0
Turnout		2,575	21.1	+0.3
Labour hold		Swing	-4.7	

==== May 2007 ====
2007
Party	Candidate	Votes	%	±%
Labour	Joanne Green*	1,497	58.9	+3.6
Liberal Democrats	Robert Brettle	355	14.0	+1.5
Conservative	Harriet Holder	294	11.6	−0.2
UKIP	Roger P Bullock	264	10.4	−1.7
Green	Katherine Smith	133	5.2	−3.2
Majority		1,142	44.9	+2.1
Turnout		2,543	20.8	−1.3
Labour hold		Swing	+1.0	

==== May 2006 ====
2006
Party	Candidate	Votes	%	±%
Labour	Paul Fairweather*	1,420	55.3	−0.3
Liberal Democrats	Gareth David Aubrey	320	12.5	−11.5
UKIP	Roger Porter Bullock	312	12.1	+12.1
Conservative	Ian Beswick	302	11.8	−2.4
Green	Darren Jason Flynn	215	8.4	+8.4
Majority		1,100	42.8	+11.2
Turnout		2,569	22.1	−4.8
Labour hold		Swing	+5.6	

==== June 2004 ====
2004 (3 vacancies; new boundaries)
Party	Candidate	Votes	%	±%
Labour	Patrick Karney*	1,600	52.9	
Labour	Joanne Green*	1,431	47.3	
Labour	Paul Fairweather*	1,365	45.1	
Liberal Democrats	Robert Dyson	691	22.9	
Liberal Democrats	David Gordon	595	19.7	
Liberal Democrats	Barbara Argyropoulos	564	18.7	
Conservative	Sebastian Chowdhury	409	13.5	
Socialist Labour	Mervyn Drage	179	5.9	
Majority		674	22.2	
Turnout		3,024	27.0	
Labour win (new seat)				
Labour win (new seat)				
Labour win (new seat)				

==== May 2003 ====
2003
Party	Candidate	Votes	%	±%
Labour	Paul Fairweather	835	67.8	+1.4
Liberal Democrats	Rob Brettle	222	18.0	+5.3
Conservative	Sebastian Chowdhury	129	10.5	+1.1
Green	Darren Milton	45	3.7	+1.7
Majority		613	49.8	−3.9
Turnout		1,231	16.2	−2.8
Labour hold		Swing	-1.9	

==== May 2002 ====
2002
Party	Candidate	Votes	%	±%
Labour	Patrick Karney*	1,014	66.4	+2.7
Liberal Democrats	David Gordon	194	12.7	−4.7
Socialist Alliance	Kay Phillips	144	9.4	+9.4
Conservative	David Timson	144	9.4	−6.4
Green	Darren Milton	31	2.0	−1.2
Majority		820	53.7	+7.4
Turnout		1,527	19.0	+3.7
Labour hold		Swing	+3.7	

==== May 2000 ====
2000
Party	Candidate	Votes	%	±%
Labour	Joanne Green*	725	63.7	−3.3
Liberal Democrats	Daniel Campbell	198	17.4	−3.0
Conservative	Rodney Keller	180	15.8	+3.2
Green	Olive Bowers	36	3.2	+3.2
Majority		527	46.3	−0.3
Turnout		1,139	15.3	−0.0
Labour hold		Swing	-0.1	

=== Elections in 1990s ===
==== May 1999 ====
1999
Party	Candidate	Votes	%	±%
Labour	Nilofar Siddiqi*	799	67.0	+3.2
Liberal Democrats	Daniel Campbell	243	20.4	−3.4
Conservative	Rodney Keller	150	12.6	+0.2
Majority		556	46.6	+6.6
Turnout		1,192	15.3	
Labour hold		Swing	+3.3	

==== May 1998 ====
1998 (2 vacancies)
Party	Candidate	Votes	%	±%
Labour	Pat Karney*	804	63.8	−8.7
Labour	Joanne Green	761		
Liberal Democrats	Andrew Steele	300	23.8	+12.0
Liberal Democrats	Arthur Tozowonah	212		
Conservative	Joan Coombes	156	12.4	+3.2
Conservative	Henry Coombes	151		
Majority		461	40.0	−20.7
Turnout		1,260		
Labour hold		Swing		
Labour hold		Swing	-10.3	

==== May 1996 ====
1996
Party	Candidate	Votes	%	±%
Labour	Graham Stringer*	1,176	72.5	+3.1
Liberal Democrats	L. Dyke	192	11.8	−7.3
Conservative	Dorothy Keller	150	9.2	−2.3
Green	C. Maile	104	6.4	+6.4
Majority		984	60.7	+10.4
Turnout		1,622		
Labour hold		Swing	+5.2	

==== May 1995 ====
1995
Party	Candidate	Votes	%	±%
Labour	Nilofar Siddiqi*	1,237	69.4	+0.8
Liberal Democrats	B. Kerrigan	341	19.1	−1.7
Conservative	Vivienne Clarke	205	11.5	+1.0
Majority		896	50.3	+2.5
Turnout		1,783		
Labour hold		Swing	+1.2	

==== May 1994 ====
1994
Party	Candidate	Votes	%	±%
Labour	Patrick Karney*	1,497	68.6	+14.7
Liberal Democrats	D. Thame	454	20.8	+11.5
Conservative	J. Samson	230	10.5	−13.4
Majority		1,043	47.8	+17.8
Turnout		2,181		
Labour hold		Swing	+1.6	

==== May 1992 ====
1992
Party	Candidate	Votes	%	±%
Labour	G. Stringer*	1,096	53.9	−4.4
Conservative	D. Keller	486	23.9	+2.3
Independent Labour	A. Shannon	262	12.9	+12.9
Liberal Democrats	V. Towers	189	9.3	−6.0
Majority		610	30.0	−6.6
Turnout		2,033		
Labour hold		Swing	-3.3	

==== May 1991 ====
1991
Party	Candidate	Votes	%	±%
Labour	N. Siddiqi*	1,546	58.3	−11.5
Conservative	D. H. Keller	574	21.6	+4.9
Liberal Democrats	N. Towers	405	15.3	+6.6
Green	S. S. Fitzgibbon	128	4.8	0
Majority		972	36.6	−16.6
Turnout		2,653	31.1	
Labour hold		Swing	-8.2	

==== May 1990 ====
1990
Party	Candidate	Votes	%	±%
Labour	Patrick Karney*	2,202	69.8	+0.7
Conservative	D. H. Keller	526	16.7	−6.9
Liberal Democrats	N. Towers	275	8.7	+1.4
Green	M. J. Clark	150	4.8	+4.8
Majority		1,676	53.2	+7.7
Turnout		3,153		
Labour hold		Swing	+3.8	

=== Elections in 1980s ===
==== May 1988 ====
1988
Party	Candidate	Votes	%	±%
Labour	G. Stringer*	2,493	69.1	+22.1
Conservative	R. Chadwick	851	23.6	−6.6
SLD	V. Towers	264	7.3	−15.4
Majority		1,642	45.5	+28.7
Turnout		3,608		
Labour hold		Swing	+14.3	

==== May 1987 ====
1987
Party	Candidate	Votes	%	±%
Labour	Nilofar Siddiqi*	1,648	47.0	−23.4
Conservative	Reginald Chadwick	1,060	30.2	+15.9
SDP	Morris Lockwood	797	22.7	+7.4
Majority		588	16.8	−38.3
Turnout		3,505		
Labour hold		Swing	-19.6	

==== May 1986 ====
1986
Party	Candidate	Votes	%	±%
Labour	Patrick Karney*	2,002	70.4	+2.1
SDP	G. Landsman	435	15.3	+1.2
Conservative	E. Dimmock	407	14.3	−3.3
Majority		1,567	55.1	+4.4
Turnout		2,844		
Labour hold		Swing	+0.4	

==== May 1984 ====
1984
Party	Candidate	Votes	%	±%
Labour	Graham Stringer*	1,985	68.3	+9.8
Conservative	W. Smith	511	17.6	−7.2
SDP	Gerald Landsman	411	14.1	−2.6
Majority		1,474	50.7	+17.0
Turnout		2,907		
Labour hold		Swing	+8.5	

==== May 1983 ====
1983
Party	Candidate	Votes	%	±%
Labour	Nilofar Siddiqi*	2,086	58.5	+2.8
Conservative	Denise Jackson	883	24.8	−1.3
SDP	Edward Charnley	596	16.7	−1.4
Majority		1,203	33.7	+4.1
Turnout		3,565		
Labour hold		Swing	+2.0	

==== May 1982 ====
1982 (3 vacancies; new boundaries)
Party	Candidate	Votes	%	±%
Labour	Patrick Karney	1,839	55.7	
Labour	Graham Stringer	1,712	51.9	
Labour	Nilofar Siddiqi	1,656	50.2	
Conservative	Joyce Harding	862	26.1	
Conservative	Norman Jones	831	25.2	
Conservative	Richard Smith	785	23.8	
SDP	Edward Charnley	598	18.1	
SDP	Anthony Newman	595	18.0	
SDP	Thomas Jones	547	16.6	
Majority		794	24.1	
Turnout		3,299	38.6	
Labour win (new seat)				
Labour win (new seat)				
Labour win (new seat)				

==== May 1980 ====
1980 (2 vacancies)
Party	Candidate	Votes	%	±%
Labour	A. Lister	1,463	57.6	−7.0
Labour	H. Reid*	1,433	56.5	−8.1
Conservative	J. Harding	511	20.1	−9.2
Conservative	F. Meaden	449	17.7	−11.6
Liberal	J. Ashley	425	16.7	+10.6
Liberal	T. M. Broderick	387	15.2	+9.1
Majority		922	36.3	+1.0
Turnout		2,538	37.4	−28.0
Labour hold		Swing		
Labour hold		Swing	+2.2	

=== Elections in 1970s ===
==== May 1979 ====
1979
Party	Candidate	Votes	%	±%
Labour	R. F. Delahunty*	2,802	64.6	+2.1
Conservative	J. Harding	1,270	29.3	−8.2
Liberal	N. Towers	266	6.1	+6.1
Majority		1,532	35.3	+10.3
Turnout		4,338	65.4	+34.5
Labour hold		Swing	+5.1	

==== May 1978 ====
1978
Party	Candidate	Votes	%	±%
Labour	K. Litherland*	1,341	62.5	+3.9
Conservative	J. Harding	804	37.5	+0.9
Majority		537	25.0	+3.0
Turnout		2,145	30.9	
Labour hold		Swing	+1.5	

==== May 1976 ====
1976
Party	Candidate	Votes	%	±%
Labour	H. Reid*	1,131	58.6	+10.8
Conservative	D. Porter	706	36.6	−2.1
Liberal	P. Hannon	92	4.8	−8.7
Majority		425	22.0	+12.9
Turnout		1,929		
Labour hold		Swing	+6.4	

==== May 1975 ====
1975
Party	Candidate	Votes	%	±%
Labour	R. F. Delahunty*	520	47.8	−15.0
Conservative	D. Porter	421	38.7	+1.5
Liberal	R. Addison	147	13.5	+13.5
Majority		99	9.1	−16.4
Turnout		1,088		
Labour hold		Swing	-8.2	

==== July 1974 (by-election) ====
By-election: 25 July 1974
Party	Candidate	Votes	%	±%
Labour	H. Reid	1,119	62.6	−0.2
Conservative	D. Porter	343	19.2	−18.0
Liberal	R. Addison	325	18.2	+18.2
Majority		776	43.4	+17.9
Turnout		1,787		
Labour hold		Swing	+8.9	

==== May 1973 ====
1973 (3 vacancies; reorganisation)
Party	Candidate	Votes	%	±%
Labour	K. Litherland*	951	60.7	−1.4
Labour	A. Nicholson*	951	60.7	−1.4
Labour	R. F. Delahunty*	927	59.2	−2.9
Conservative	G. Cleworth	564	36.0	−1.9
Conservative	A. P. Osborn	556	35.5	−2.4
Conservative	M. Withers	532	34.0	−3.9
Majority		363	23.2	−1.0
Turnout		1,566		
Labour hold		Swing		
Labour hold		Swing		
Labour hold		Swing		

==== May 1972 ====
1972
Party	Candidate	Votes	%	±%
Labour	S. N. M. Moxley*	1,412	62.1	−8.8
Conservative	A. P. Osborn	860	37.9	+7.2
Majority		552	24.2	−13.0
Turnout		2,272		
Labour hold		Swing		

==== July 1971 (by-election) ====
By-election: 8 July 1971
Party	Candidate	Votes	%	±%
Labour	R. K. Litherland	1,305	76.8	+5.9
Conservative	F. W. Lever	395	23.2	−7.4
Majority		910	53.5	+16.3
Turnout		1,700		
Labour hold		Swing		

==== May 1971 ====
1971 (3 vacancies; new boundaries)
Party	Candidate	Votes	%	±%
Labour	J. B. Ogden*	2,553	70.9	
Labour	A. Nicholson*	2,503	69.5	
Labour	S. N. M. Moxley	2,447	67.9	
Conservative	F. W. Lever*	1,107	30.7	
Conservative	J. Holden*	1,042	28.9	
Conservative	V. M. Taylor*	1,016	28.2	
Communist	S. Cole	138	3.8	
Majority		1,340	37.2	
Turnout		3,602		
Labour win (new seat)				
Labour win (new seat)				
Labour win (new seat)				

==== May 1970 ====
1970
Party	Candidate	Votes	%	±%
Conservative	J. Holden	962	45.3	−13.2
Labour	S. N. M. Moxley	952	44.8	+3.3
Liberal	R. Jackson	195	9.2	N/A
Residents	L. George	15	0.7	N/A
Majority		10	0.5	−16.5
Turnout		2,124		
Conservative hold		Swing		

=== Elections in 1960s ===
==== May 1969 ====
1969
Party	Candidate	Votes	%	±%
Conservative	V. M. Taylor	1,209	58.5	−0.5
Labour	A. O'Toole*	858	41.5	+0.5
Majority		351	17.0	−1.0
Turnout		2,067		
Conservative gain from Labour		Swing		

==== May 1968 ====
1968
Party	Candidate	Votes	%	±%
Conservative	E. F. Thornhill	1,332	59.0	+4.5
Labour	E. Grant*	924	41.0	−4.5
Majority		408	18.0	+9.0
Turnout		2,256		
Conservative gain from Labour		Swing		

==== May 1967 ====
1967
Party	Candidate	Votes	%	±%
Conservative	K. Allday	1,578	54.5	+10.4
Labour	H. Waddicor*	1,318	45.5	−10.4
Majority		260	9.0	
Turnout		2,896		
Conservative gain from Labour		Swing		

==== May 1966 ====
1966
Party	Candidate	Votes	%	±%
Labour	A. O'Toole*	1,463	55.9	+4.6
Conservative	K. Allday	1,153	44.1	−4.6
Majority		310	11.8	+9.2
Turnout		2,616		
Labour hold		Swing		

==== May 1965 ====
1965
Party	Candidate	Votes	%	±%
Labour	E. Grant*	1,537	51.3	−11.5
Conservative	J. Egan	1,458	48.7	+11.5
Majority		79	2.6	−23.0
Turnout		2,995		
Labour hold		Swing		

==== May 1964 ====
1964
Party	Candidate	Votes	%	±%
Labour	H. Waddicor*	1,994	62.8	−4.7
Conservative	J. Egan	1,179	37.2	+4.7
Majority		815	25.6	−9.4
Turnout		3,173		
Labour hold		Swing		

==== May 1963 ====
1963
Party	Candidate	Votes	%	±%
Labour	A. O'Toole*	2,348	67.5	+2.9
Conservative	J. Egan	1,130	32.5	−0.9
Majority		1,218	35.0	+3.8
Turnout		3,478		
Labour hold		Swing		

==== May 1962 ====
1962
Party	Candidate	Votes	%	±%
Labour	E. Grant*	2,115	64.6	+9.8
Conservative	R. Hardy	1,092	33.4	−11.8
Union Movement	R. Kershaw	67	2.0	N/A
Majority		1,023	31.2	+21.6
Turnout		3,274		
Labour hold		Swing		

==== May 1961 ====
1961
Party	Candidate	Votes	%	±%
Labour	H. Waddicor	2,233	54.8	+1.1
Conservative	J. Chatterton	1,842	45.2	−1.1
Majority		391	9.6	+2.2
Turnout		4,075		
Labour hold		Swing		

==== May 1960 ====
1960
Party	Candidate	Votes	%	±%
Labour	A. O'Toole*	1,686	53.7	−7.5
Conservative	A. Jones	1,456	46.3	+7.5
Majority		230	7.4	−15.0
Turnout		3,142		
Labour hold		Swing		

=== Elections in 1950s ===
==== May 1959 ====
1959
Party	Candidate	Votes	%	±%
Labour	E. Grant*	2,473	61.2	−5.8
Conservative	A. Jones	1,568	38.8	+5.8
Majority		905	22.4	−11.6
Turnout		4,041		
Labour hold		Swing		

==== May 1958 ====
1958
Party	Candidate	Votes	%	±%
Labour	H. P. J. Hinderer*	2,466	67.0	+2.8
Conservative	D. Simms	1,212	33.0	−2.8
Majority		1,254	34.0	+5.6
Turnout		3,678		
Labour hold		Swing		

==== May 1957 ====
1957
Party	Candidate	Votes	%	±%
Labour	A. O'Toole*	2,702	64.2	+6.2
Conservative	J. C. Brearley	1,504	35.8	−6.2
Majority		1,198	28.4	+12.4
Turnout		4,206		
Labour hold		Swing		

==== May 1956 ====
1956
Party	Candidate	Votes	%	±%
Labour	E. Grant*	2,691	58.0	+4.2
Conservative	E. Bland	1,952	42.0	−4.2
Majority		739	16.0	+8.4
Turnout		4,643		
Labour hold		Swing		

==== May 1955 ====
1955
Party	Candidate	Votes	%	±%
Labour	H. P. J. Hinderer*	2,787	53.8	+2.5
Conservative	L. J. Naden	2,393	46.2	−2.5
Majority		394	7.6	+5.0
Turnout		5,180		
Labour hold		Swing		

==== May 1954 ====
1954
Party	Candidate	Votes	%	±%
Labour	A. O'Toole	3,389	51.3	−3.1
Conservative	J. Chatterton*	3,214	48.7	+3.1
Majority		175	2.6	−6.2
Turnout		6,603		
Labour gain from Conservative		Swing		

==== May 1953 ====
1953
Party	Candidate	Votes	%	±%
Labour	E. Grant*	3,617	54.4	−7.2
Conservative	P. H. Craig	3,038	45.6	+7.2
Majority		579	8.8	−14.4
Turnout		6,655		
Labour hold		Swing		

==== May 1952 ====
1952
Party	Candidate	Votes	%	±%
Labour	H. P. J. Hinderer*	4,383	61.6	+16.4
Conservative	T. Brunt	2,737	38.4	−16.4
Majority		1,646	23.2	
Turnout		7,120		
Labour hold		Swing		

==== May 1951 ====
1951
Party	Candidate	Votes	%	±%
Conservative	J. Chatterton*	3,754	54.8	+11.0
Labour	J. B. Ogden	3,097	45.2	−9.8
Majority		657	9.6	
Turnout		6,698		
Conservative hold		Swing		

==== May 1950 ====
1950 (new boundaries)
Party	Candidate	Votes	%	±%
Labour	E. Grant	3,682	55.0	
Conservative	A. L. Mansfield*	2,931	43.8	
Communist	R. F. G. Baughn	85	1.2	
Majority		751	11.2	
Turnout		6,698		
Labour gain from Conservative		Swing		

=== Elections in 1940s ===
==== May 1949 ====
1949
Party	Candidate	Votes	%	±%
Labour	H. P. J. Hinderer*	3,719	51.5	+4.9
Conservative	H. King	3,496	48.5	−3.1
Majority		223	3.0	
Turnout		7,215		
Labour hold		Swing		

==== November 1947 ====
1947
Party	Candidate	Votes	%	±%
Conservative	J. Chatterton	4,282	51.6	+8.3
Labour	C. Blackwell	3,871	46.6	−1.7
Communist	T. Royle	152	1.8	−0.8
Majority		411	5.0	
Turnout		8,305		
Conservative hold		Swing		

==== March 1947 (by-election) ====
By-election: 13 March 1947
Party	Candidate	Votes	%	±%
Conservative	A. L. Mansfield	2,748	54.8	+11.5
Labour	A. Barnacott	2,269	45.2	−3.1
Majority		479	9.6	
Turnout		5,017		
Conservative gain from Labour		Swing		

==== November 1946 ====
1946
Party	Candidate	Votes	%	±%
Labour	E. Barnacott*	3,007	48.3	−7.4
Conservative	C. F. Howarth	2,693	43.3	−1.0
Liberal	J. Mountford	361	5.8	N/A
Communist	T. Royle	159	2.6	N/A
Majority		314	5.0	−6.4
Turnout		6,220		
Labour hold		Swing		

==== November 1945 ====
1945
Party	Candidate	Votes	%	±%
Labour	H. P. J. Hinderer	3,408	55.7	+6.1
Conservative	C. F. Howarth*	2,713	44.3	−6.1
Majority		695	11.4	
Turnout		6,121	46.5	
Labour gain from Conservative		Swing		

=== Elections in 1930s ===
==== November 1938 ====
1938
Party	Candidate	Votes	%	±%
Conservative	E. Shaw	2,155	50.4	+0.8
Labour	J. Howard*	2,125	49.6	−0.8
Majority		30	0.8	
Turnout		4,280		
Conservative gain from Labour		Swing		

==== November 1937 ====
1937
Party	Candidate	Votes	%	±%
Labour	E. Barnacott*	2,305	50.4	+7.0
Conservative	E. Shaw	2,267	49.6	−7.0
Majority		38	0.8	
Turnout		4,572		
Labour hold		Swing		

==== November 1936 ====
1936
Party	Candidate	Votes	%	±%
Conservative	C. F. Howarth*	2,692	56.6	+8.8
Labour	E. Barnacott	2,061	43.4	−8.8
Majority		631	13.2	
Turnout		4,753		
Conservative hold		Swing		

==== November 1935 ====
1935
Party	Candidate	Votes	%	±%
Labour	J. Howard*	2,568	52.2	+1.6
Conservative	J. R. Spence	2,352	47.8	−1.6
Majority		216	4.4	+3.2
Turnout		4,920		
Labour hold		Swing		

==== November 1934 ====
1934
Party	Candidate	Votes	%	±%
Labour	E. Barnacott	2,691	50.6	+0.8
Conservative	A. Heald	2,623	49.4	−0.8
Majority		68	1.2	
Turnout		5,314		
Labour gain from Conservative		Swing		

==== November 1933 ====
1933
Party	Candidate	Votes	%	±%
Conservative	C. F. Howarth*	2,483	50.2	+0.4
Labour	E. Barnacott	2,461	49.8	−0.4
Majority		22	0.4	
Turnout		4,944		
Conservative hold		Swing		

==== November 1932 ====
1932
Party	Candidate	Votes	%	±%
Labour	J. Howard*	2,584	50.2	+14.6
Conservative	J. Chatterton	2,568	49.8	−14.6
Majority		16	0.4	
Turnout		5,152		
Labour hold		Swing		

==== February 1932 (by-election) ====
By-election: 2 February 1932
Party	Candidate	Votes	%	±%
Conservative	E. Shields	2,592	60.2	−4.2
Labour	E. Barnacott	1,714	39.8	+4.2
Majority		878	20.4	−8.4
Turnout		4,306	42.1	−14.0
Conservative hold		Swing		

==== November 1931 ====
1931
Party	Candidate	Votes	%	±%
Conservative	F. Sutton	3,696	64.4	+9.5
Labour	E. Barnacott	2,042	35.6	−9.5
Majority		1,654	28.8	+19.0
Turnout		5,738	56.1	
Conservative gain from Labour		Swing		

==== November 1930 ====
1930
Party	Candidate	Votes	%	±%
Conservative	C. F. Howarth	2,766	54.9	+8.4
Labour	W. Onions*	2,273	45.1	−8.4
Majority		493	9.8	
Turnout		5,039		
Conservative gain from Labour		Swing		

=== Elections in 1920s ===
==== November 1929 ====
1929
Party	Candidate	Votes	%	±%
Labour	J. Howard*	2,318	53.5	0
Conservative	F. Sutton	2,014	46.5	+1.5
Majority		304	7.0	−1.5
Turnout		4,332	41.3	−19.8
Labour hold		Swing		

==== November 1928 ====
1928
Party	Candidate	Votes	%	±%
Labour	R. Lundy*	3,230	53.5	+2.2
Conservative	C. F. Howarth	2,719	45.0	−3.7
Residents	J. A. P. Holmes	91	1.5	N/A
Majority		511	8.5	+5.9
Turnout		6,040	61.1	+8.6
Labour hold		Swing		

==== November 1927 ====
1927
Party	Candidate	Votes	%	±%
Labour	W. Onions	2,670	51.3	+0.1
Conservative	W. Gilgryst*	2,532	48.7	−0.1
Majority		138	2.6	+0.2
Turnout		5,202	52.5	−2.7
Labour gain from Conservative		Swing		

==== November 1926 ====
1926
Party	Candidate	Votes	%	±%
Labour	J. Howard	2,811	51.2	+0.8
Conservative	E. Eady	2,675	48.8	−0.8
Majority		136	2.4	+1.6
Turnout		5,486	55.2	−5.8
Labour gain from Conservative		Swing		

==== November 1925 ====
1925
Party	Candidate	Votes	%	±%
Labour	R. Lundy*	3,040	50.4	+5.2
Conservative	E. E. Walsh	2,992	49.6	−5.2
Majority		48	0.8	
Turnout		6,032	61.0	
Labour hold		Swing		

==== November 1924 ====
1924
Party	Candidate	Votes	%	±%
Conservative	W. Gilgryst*	3,189	54.8	−1.8
Labour	A. E. Wolstenholme	2,628	45.2	+1.8
Majority		561	9.6	−3.6
Turnout		5,817		
Conservative hold		Swing		

==== November 1923 ====
1923
Party	Candidate	Votes	%	±%
Conservative	T. Hoyle*	3,088	56.6	+7.5
Labour	A. E. Wolstenholme	2,369	43.4	−5.8
Majority		719	13.2	
Turnout		5,457		
Conservative hold		Swing		

==== November 1922 ====
1922
Party	Candidate	Votes	%	±%
Labour	R. Lundy*	2,287	49.2	+4.3
Conservative	E. E. Walsh	2,284	49.1	−5.1
National Unemployed Workers' Movement	P. Murphy	80	1.7	N/A
Majority		3	0.1	
Turnout		4,651	48.1	−1.1
Labour hold		Swing		

==== November 1921 ====
1921
Party	Candidate	Votes	%	±%
Conservative	W. Gilgryst*	2,575	54.2	+12.9
Labour	A. E. Wolstenholme	2,135	44.9	+17.4
Independent	G. A. Jones	44	0.9	N/A
Majority		440	9.3	−4.5
Turnout		4,754	49.2	−7.5
Conservative hold		Swing		

==== November 1920 ====
1920
Party	Candidate	Votes	%	±%
Conservative	T. Hoyle	2,210	41.3	+13.9
Labour	A. E. Wolstenholme	1,473	27.5	−45.1
Liberal	H. W. Irwin	860	16.1	N/A
NFDDSS	J. Whelan*	806	15.1	N/A
Majority		737	13.8	
Turnout		5,349	56.7	+21.7
Conservative gain from NFDDSS		Swing		

=== Elections in 1910s ===
==== November 1919 ====
1919 (new boundaries)
Party	Candidate	Votes	%	±%
Labour	R. Lundy	2,401	72.6	
Conservative	T. McRoy*	904	27.4	
Majority		1,497	45.3	
Turnout		3,305	35.0	
Labour gain from Conservative		Swing		

==== October 1918 (by-election) ====
By-election: 16 October 1918
Party	Candidate	Votes	%	±%
NFDDSS	J. Whelan	1,068	61.0	
Labour	F. Eccles	684	39.0	
Majority		384	22.0	
Turnout		1,752		
NFDDSS gain from Labour		Swing		

==== November 1914 ====
1914
Party	Candidate	Votes	%	±%
Conservative	W. Holden*	uncontested		
Conservative hold		Swing		

==== November 1913 (by-election) ====
By-election: 21 November 1913
Party	Candidate	Votes	%	±%
Conservative	T. McRoy	1,924	46.5	N/A
Labour	R. Bebbington	1,489	36.0	N/A
Liberal	J. Bailey	721	17.5	N/A
Majority		435	10.5	N/A
Turnout		4,134	53.5	N/A
Conservative hold		Swing		

==== November 1913 ====
1913
Party	Candidate	Votes	%	±%
Labour	W. T. Jackson*	uncontested		
Labour hold		Swing		

==== November 1912 ====
1912
Party	Candidate	Votes	%	±%
Conservative	J. Hargreaves*	1,913	44.2	−11.0
Labour	R. Bebbington	1,374	31.7	−13.1
Liberal	C. Peach	1,041	24.1	N/A
Majority		539	12.5	+2.1
Turnout		4,328		
Conservative hold		Swing		

==== November 1911 ====
1911
Party	Candidate	Votes	%	±%
Conservative	W. Holden*	2,523	55.2	+7.7
Labour	R. Bebbington	2,048	44.8	−7.7
Majority		475	10.4	
Turnout		4,571		
Conservative hold		Swing		

==== November 1910 ====
1910
Party	Candidate	Votes	%	±%
Labour	W. T. Jackson*	2,016	52.5	−3.1
Conservative	W. Gilgryst	1,822	47.5	−3.1
Majority		194	5.0	
Turnout		3,838		
Labour hold		Swing		

=== Elections in 1900s ===
==== November 1909 ====
1909
Party	Candidate	Votes	%	±%
Conservative	J. Hargreaves*	2,454	50.6	−4.2
Labour	J. Fogarty	2,399	49.4	+4.2
Majority		55	1.2	−8.4
Turnout		4,853		
Conservative hold		Swing		

==== November 1908 ====
1908
Party	Candidate	Votes	%	±%
Conservative	W. Holden*	2,844	54.8	+18.4
Labour	J. Fogarty	2,343	45.2	+0.6
Majority		501	9.6	
Turnout		5,187		
Conservative hold		Swing		

==== November 1907 ====
1907
Party	Candidate	Votes	%	±%
Labour	W. T. Jackson	1,986	44.6	−5.1
Conservative	A. Whitfield	1,619	36.4	−13.9
Liberal	J. Rickard	804	18.1	N/A
Independent	J. Stanton	39	0.9	N/A
Majority		367	8.2	
Turnout		4,448		
Labour gain from Liberal		Swing		

==== November 1906 ====
1906
Party	Candidate	Votes	%	±%
Conservative	J. Hargreaves	2,170	50.3	−4.5
Labour	W. T. Jackson*	2,147	49.7	+4.5
Majority		23	0.6	−9.0
Turnout		4,317		
Conservative gain from Labour		Swing		

==== November 1905 ====
1905
Party	Candidate	Votes	%	±%
Conservative	W. Holden*	2,384	54.8	N/A
Labour	T. D. Benson	1,967	45.2	N/A
Majority		417	9.6	
Turnout		4,351		
Conservative hold		Swing		

==== November 1904 ====
1904
Party	Candidate	Votes	%	±%
Liberal	P. Whyman*	1,743	56.2	N/A
Independent	W. Brown	1,361	43.8	N/A
Majority		382	12.4	
Turnout		3,104		
Liberal hold		Swing		

==== November 1903 ====
1903
Party	Candidate	Votes	%	±%
Labour	W. T. Jackson	2,305	55.4	+14.1
Conservative	C. Smith	1,852	44.6	−14.1
Majority		453	10.8	
Turnout		4,157		
Labour hold		Swing		

==== November 1902 ====
1902
Party	Candidate	Votes	%	±%
Conservative	W. Holden	2,783	58.7	N/A
Labour	T. Cook	1,956	41.3	N/A
Majority		827	17.4	N/A
Turnout		4,739		
Conservative hold		Swing		

==== November 1901 ====
1901
Party	Candidate	Votes	%	±%
Liberal	P. Whyman*	uncontested		
Liberal hold		Swing		

==== November 1900 ====
1900
Party	Candidate	Votes	%	±%
Labour	F. Brocklehurst*	3,003	57.8	+25.0
Conservative	G. W. Chadwick	2,195	42.2	−1.9
Majority		808	15.6	
Turnout		5,198		
Labour hold		Swing		

=== Elections in 1890s ===
==== November 1899 ====
1899
Party	Candidate	Votes	%	±%
Conservative	J. Faulkner	1,615	44.1	+2.5
Ind. Labour Party	T. Cook	1,201	32.8	N/A
Liberal	H. Noble	843	23.0	−32.9
Majority		414	11.4	
Turnout		3,659		
Conservative hold		Swing		

==== November 1898 ====
1898
Party	Candidate	Votes	%	±%
Liberal	P. Whyman*	2,452	55.9	N/A
Conservative	J. Hargreaves	1,826	41.6	−6.0
Independent	W. Brown	108	2.5	N/A
Majority		626	14.3	
Turnout		4,386		
Liberal hold		Swing		

==== November 1897 (by-election) ====
By-election: 5 November 1897
Party	Candidate	Votes	%	±%
Liberal	P. Whyman	2,972	61.4	N/A
Conservative	J. Hargreaves	1,870	38.6	−9.0
Majority		1,102	22.8	
Turnout		4,842		
Liberal gain from Conservative		Swing		

==== November 1897 ====
1897
Party	Candidate	Votes	%	±%
Ind. Labour Party	F. Brocklehurst	2,865	52.4	+21.4
Conservative	G. Needham*	2,606	47.6	+8.9
Majority		259	4.8	
Turnout		5,471		
Ind. Labour Party gain from Conservative		Swing		

==== November 1896 ====
1896
Party	Candidate	Votes	%	±%
Conservative	G. W. Chadwick	1,911	38.7	−23.6
Ind. Labour Party	J. Harker	1,533	31.0	−6.6
Liberal	W. Sherratt*	1,494	30.3	N/A
Majority		378	7.7	−16.9
Turnout		4,938		
Conservative gain from Liberal		Swing		

==== November 1895 ====
1895
Party	Candidate	Votes	%	±%
Conservative	J. Richards*	2,194	62.3	+7.5
Ind. Labour Party	J. Harker	1,326	37.7	+16.1
Majority		868	24.6	−6.6
Turnout		3,520		
Conservative hold		Swing		

==== November 1894 ====
1894
Party	Candidate	Votes	%	±%
Conservative	G. Needham*	2,616	54.8	+12.3
Liberal	G. W. Chadwick	1,125	23.6	−19.0
Ind. Labour Party	J. Harker	1,032	21.6	+6.7
Majority		1,491	31.2	
Turnout		4,773		
Conservative hold		Swing		

==== November 1893 ====
1893
Party	Candidate	Votes	%	±%
Liberal	W. Sherratt*	1,941	42.6	N/A
Conservative	G. W. Chadwick	1,935	42.5	−19.6
Ind. Labour Party	F. Connor	676	14.9	−20.0
Majority		6	0.1	
Turnout		4,552		
Liberal hold		Swing		

==== November 1892 ====
1892
Party	Candidate	Votes	%	±%
Conservative	J. Richards*	2,163	65.1	N/A
Ind. Labour Party	A. Settle	1,162	34.9	N/A
Majority		1,001	30.2	N/A
Turnout		3,325		
Conservative hold		Swing		

==== November 1891 ====
1891
Party	Candidate	Votes	%	±%
Conservative	G. Needham*	uncontested		
Conservative hold		Swing		

==== November 1890 ====
1890
Party	Candidate	Votes	%	±%
Liberal	W. Sherratt*	2,115	50.5	+12.5
Conservative	J. Faulkner	2,075	49.5	−12.5
Majority		40	1.0	
Turnout		4,190		
Liberal hold		Swing		

=== Elections in 1880s ===
==== November 1889 ====
1889
Party	Candidate	Votes	%	±%
Conservative	J. Richards*	2,104	62.0	N/A
Liberal	T. W. Foxcroft	1,288	38.0	N/A
Majority		816	24.0	N/A
Turnout		3,392		
Conservative hold		Swing		

==== November 1888 ====
1888
Party	Candidate	Votes	%	±%
Conservative	G. Needham*	uncontested		
Conservative hold		Swing		

==== November 1887 ====
1887
Party	Candidate	Votes	%	±%
Liberal	W. Sherratt*	2,032	54.2	+13.9
Conservative	R. Smith	1,716	45.8	−13.9
Majority		316	8.4	
Turnout		3,748		
Liberal hold		Swing		

==== November 1886 ====
1886
Party	Candidate	Votes	%	±%
Conservative	J. Richards*	2,084	59.7	−1.2
Liberal	J. R. Lancashire	1,409	40.3	−14.7
Majority		675	19.4	+14.8
Turnout		3,493		
Conservative hold		Swing		

==== November 1885 ====
1885 (3 vacancies)
Party	Candidate	Votes	%	±%
Conservative	G. Needham	2,052	60.9	
Liberal	W. Sharratt	1,855	55.0	
Conservative	J. Richards	1,755	52.1	
Conservative	A. Wilkinson	1,601	47.5	
Liberal	J. R. Lancashire	1,507	44.7	
Liberal	T. W. Foxcroft	1,343	39.8	
Majority		154	4.6	
Turnout		3,371		
Conservative win (new seat)				
Liberal win (new seat)				
Conservative win (new seat)				

== See also ==
- Manchester City Council
- Manchester City Council elections
