= 1900 Manchester City Council election =

Local election in Manchester

- 1 November 1900

26 of 104 seats to Manchester City Council 53 seats needed for a majority
	First party	Second party	Third party
Party	Conservative	Liberal	Labour
Last election	18 seats, 51.1%	8 seats, 39.7%	0 seats, 8.2%
Seats before	49	47	3
Seats won	14	8	2
Seats after	51	45	3
Seat change	▲2	▼2	Steady
Popular vote	15,785	11,880	8,547
Percentage	43.6%	32.8%	23.6%
Swing	▼7.5%	▼6.9%	▲15.4%
	Fourth party	Fifth party	Sixth party
Party	Liberal Unionist	Independent	Social Democratic Federation
Last election	0 seats, 0.0%	0 seats, 1.0%	0 seats, 0.0%
Seats before	3	1	1
Seats won	0	1	1
Seats after	3	1	1
Seat change	Steady	Steady	Steady
Popular vote	0	0	0
Percentage	0.0%	0.0%	0.0%
Swing	Steady	▼1.0%	Steady
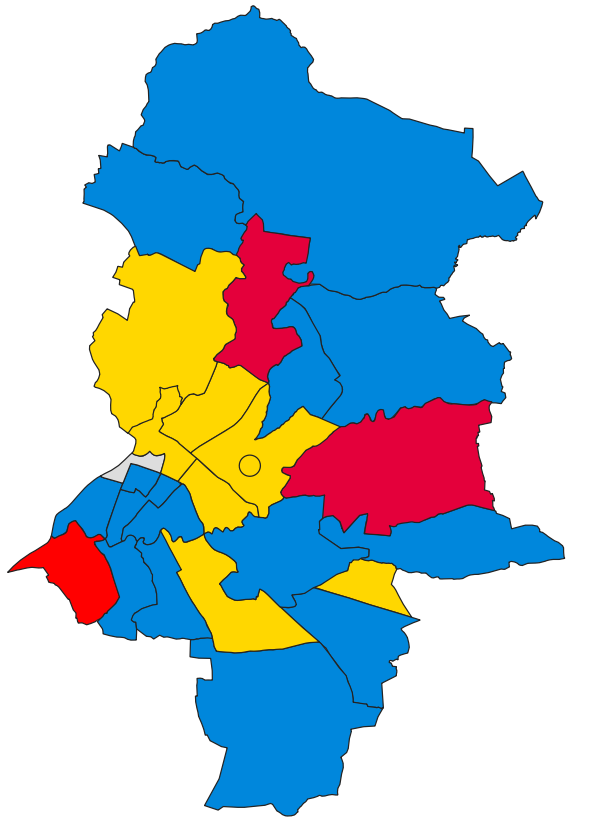
- Map of results of 1900 election
Leader of the Council before election
No overall control
Leader of the Council after election
No overall control

Elections to Manchester City Council were held on Thursday, 1 November 1900. One third of the councillors seats were up for election, with each successful candidate to serve a three-year term of office. The council remained under no overall control.

== Election result ==
Party	Votes		Seats			Full Council	
Conservative Party	15,785 (43.6%)	▼7.5	14 (53.8%)	14 / 26	▲2	51 (49.0%)	51 / 104
Liberal Party	11,880 (32.8%)	▼6.9	8 (30.8%)	8 / 26	▼2	45 (43.3%)	45 / 104
Labour Party	8,547 (23.6%)	▲15.4	2 (7.7%)	2 / 26	Steady	3 (2.9%)	3 / 104
Liberal Unionist	0 (0.0%)	Steady	0 (0.0%)	0 / 26	Steady	3 (2.9%)	3 / 104
Independent	0 (0.0%)	▼1.0	1 (3.8%)	1 / 26	Steady	1 (1.0%)	1 / 104
Social Democratic Federation	0 (0.0%)	Steady	1 (3.8%)	1 / 26	Steady	1 (1.0%)	1 / 104

=== Full council ===
↓
1	3	45	1	3	51

=== Aldermen ===
↓
15	3	8

=== Councillors ===
↓
1	3	30	1	43

== Ward results ==
=== All Saints' ===
All Saints'
Party	Candidate	Votes	%	±%
Conservative	C. Hornby*	uncontested		
Conservative hold		Swing		

=== Ardwick ===
Ardwick
Party	Candidate	Votes	%	±%
Conservative	J. Whittaker*	1,629	54.4	−3.5
Labour	G. Wearing	1,368	45.6	N/A
Majority		261	8.8	−7.0
Turnout		2,997		
Conservative hold		Swing		

=== Blackley and Moston ===
Blackley and Moston
Party	Candidate	Votes	%	±%
Conservative	T. Briggs*	uncontested		
Conservative hold		Swing		

=== Bradford ===
Bradford
Party	Candidate	Votes	%	±%
Labour	J. E. Sutton*	3,008	68.8	N/A
Conservative	G. Jennison	1,363	31.2	N/A
Majority		1,645	37.6	N/A
Turnout		4,371		
Labour hold		Swing		

=== Cheetham ===
Cheetham
Party	Candidate	Votes	%	±%
Liberal	J. Halliday*	1,447	55.4	N/A
Conservative	R. Oliver	1,166	44.6	−34.9
Majority		281	10.8	
Turnout		2,613		
Liberal hold		Swing		

=== Collegiate Church ===
Collegiate Church
Party	Candidate	Votes	%	±%
Liberal	J. Royle*	uncontested		
Liberal hold		Swing		

=== Crumpsall ===
Crumpsall
Party	Candidate	Votes	%	±%
Conservative	E. Holt*	uncontested		
Conservative hold		Swing		

=== Exchange ===
Exchange
Party	Candidate	Votes	%	±%
Independent	F. Moss*	uncontested		
Independent hold		Swing		

=== Harpurhey ===
Harpurhey
Party	Candidate	Votes	%	±%
Labour	F. Brocklehurst*	3,003	57.8	+25.0
Conservative	G. W. Chadwick	2,195	42.2	−1.9
Majority		808	15.6	
Turnout		5,198		
Labour hold		Swing		

=== Longsight ===
Longsight
Party	Candidate	Votes	%	±%
Conservative	J. Jones*	uncontested		
Conservative hold		Swing		

=== Medlock Street ===
Medlock Street
Party	Candidate	Votes	%	±%
Conservative	W. Kemp*	1,706	56.8	+16.3
Liberal	R. Carhart	1,299	43.2	−16.3
Majority		407	13.6	
Turnout		3,005		
Conservative hold		Swing		

=== Miles Platting ===
Miles Platting
Party	Candidate	Votes	%	±%
Conservative	S. Dixon*	uncontested		
Conservative hold		Swing		

=== New Cross ===
New Cross
Party	Candidate	Votes	%	±%
Liberal	D. Boyle*	2,917	63.3	+4.0
Liberal	J. Simpson*	2,914	63.2	+3.9
Conservative	E. G. Simpson	1,708	37.0	−7.9
Conservative	F. B. Smith	1,679	36.4	−8.5
Majority		1,206	26.2	+19.9
Turnout		4,610		
Liberal hold		Swing		
Liberal hold		Swing		

=== Newton Heath ===
Newton Heath
Party	Candidate	Votes	%	±%
Conservative	J. Garlick*	uncontested		
Conservative hold		Swing		

=== Openshaw ===
Openshaw
Party	Candidate	Votes	%	±%
Conservative	J. Pollitt*	1,779	60.4	+1.0
Labour	E. J. Hart	1,168	39.6	−1.0
Majority		611	20.8	+2.0
Turnout		2,947		
Conservative hold		Swing		

=== Oxford ===
Oxford
Party	Candidate	Votes	%	±%
Conservative	G. Simpson	325	51.9	N/A
Liberal	A. Burgon	301	48.1	N/A
Majority		24	3.8	N/A
Turnout		626		
Conservative gain from Liberal		Swing		

=== Rusholme ===
Rusholme
Party	Candidate	Votes	%	±%
Conservative	G. K. Ashton*	uncontested		
Conservative hold		Swing		

=== St. Ann's ===
St. Ann's
Party	Candidate	Votes	%	±%
Conservative	W. H. Vaudrey*	uncontested		
Conservative hold		Swing		

=== St. Clement's ===
St. Clement's
Party	Candidate	Votes	%	±%
Liberal	J. Harrop*	751	54.9	+9.2
Conservative	R. A. Kinder	616	45.1	−9.2
Majority		125	9.8	
Turnout		1,367		
Liberal hold		Swing		

=== St. George's ===
St. George's
Party	Candidate	Votes	%	±%
Social Democratic Federation	W. Maben*	uncontested		
Social Democratic Federation hold		Swing		

=== St. James' ===
St. James'
Party	Candidate	Votes	%	±%
Conservative	T. T. Shann*	uncontested		
Conservative hold		Swing		

=== St. John's ===
St. John's
Party	Candidate	Votes	%	±%
Conservative	J. Ingle	510	51.5	N/A
Liberal	M. Wells*	481	48.5	N/A
Majority		29	3.0	N/A
Turnout		991		
Conservative gain from Liberal		Swing		

=== St. Luke's ===
St. Luke's
Party	Candidate	Votes	%	±%
Liberal	A. H. Scott*	1,770	61.5	N/A
Conservative	W. Chapman	1,109	38.5	N.A
Majority		661	23.0	N/A
Turnout		2,879		
Liberal hold		Swing		

=== St. Mark's ===
St. Mark's
Party	Candidate	Votes	%	±%
Liberal	W. H. Wainwright*	uncontested		
Liberal hold		Swing		

=== St. Michael's ===
St. Michael's
Party	Candidate	Votes	%	±%
Liberal	T. Quinn Ruddin*	uncontested		
Liberal hold		Swing		

== Aldermanic elections ==
=== Aldermanic election, 5 December 1900 ===
Caused by the resignation on 5 November 1900 of Alderman Lloyd Higginbottom (Liberal, elected as an alderman by the council on 10 November 1890).

In his place, Councillor William Birkbeck (Liberal, New Cross, elected 17 November 1887) was elected as an alderman by the council on 5 December 1900.

Party	Alderman	Ward	Term expires
Liberal	William Birkbeck		1904

== By-elections between 1900 and 1901 ==
=== New Cross, 11 December 1900 ===
Caused by the election as an alderman of Councillor William Birkbeck (Liberal, New Cross, elected 17 November 1887) on 5 December 1900 following the resignation on 5 November 1900 of Alderman Lloyd Higginbottom (Liberal, elected as an alderman by the council on 10 November 1890).

New Cross
Party	Candidate	Votes	%	±%
Liberal	G. Howarth	uncontested		
Liberal hold		Swing		

=== St. George's, 22 January 1901 ===
Caused by the death of Councillor William Maben (Social Democratic Federation, St. George's, elected 1 November 1897) on 3 January 1901.

St. George's
Party	Candidate	Votes	%	±%
Liberal	F. W. Maxwell	1,669	61.2	N/A
Conservative	P. H. Jordan	1,060	38.8	N/A
Majority		609	22.4	N/A
Turnout		2,729		
Liberal gain from Social Democratic Federation		Swing		
