= 1877 Manchester City Council election =

Local election in Manchester

- 1 November 1877

16 of 64 seats to Manchester City Council 33 seats needed for a majority
	First party	Second party
Party	Liberal	Conservative
Last election	13 seats, 51.8%	3 seats, 48.2%
Seats before	42	22
Seats won	10	6
Seats after	44	20
Seat change	▲2	▼2
Popular vote	587	480
Percentage	55.0%	45.0%
Swing	▲3.2%	▼3.2%
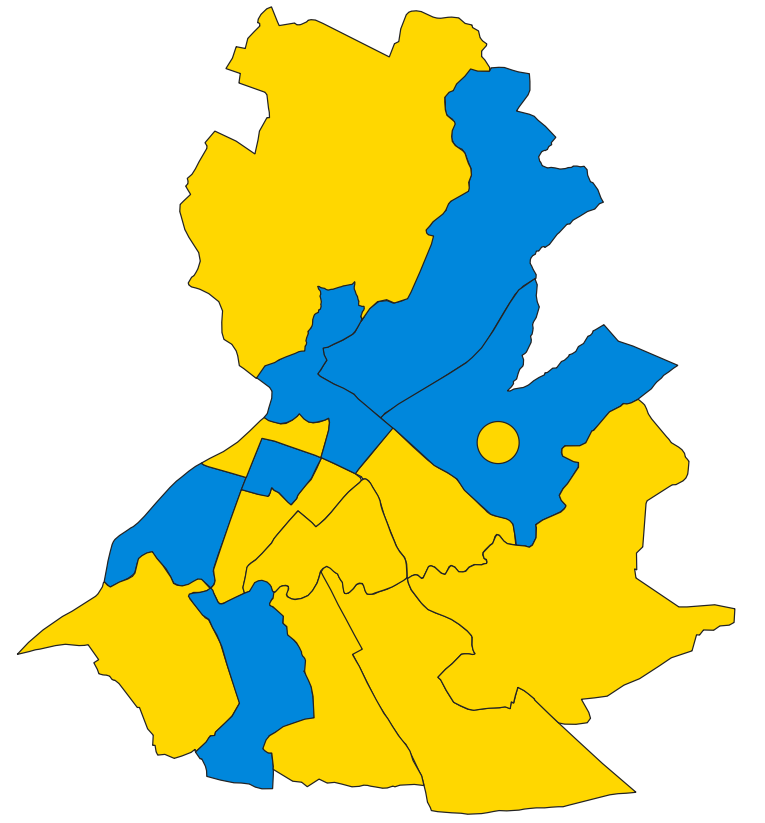
- Map of results of 1877 election
Leader of the Council before election
Liberal
Leader of the Council after election
Liberal

Elections to Manchester City Council took place on Thursday, 1 November 1877. One third of the councillors seats were up for election, with each successful candidate to serve a three-year term of office. The Liberal Party retained overall control of the council.

== Election result ==
Party	Votes		Seats			Full Council	
Liberal Party	587 (55.0%)	▲3.2	10 (62.5%)	10 / 16	▲2	44 (68.8%)	44 / 64
Conservative Party	480 (45.0%)	▼3.2	6 (37.5%)	6 / 16	▼2	20 (31.2%)	20 / 64

=== Full council ===
↓
44	20

=== Aldermen ===
↓
11	5

=== Councillors ===
↓
33	15

== Ward results ==
=== All Saints' ===
All Saints'
Party	Candidate	Votes	%	±%
Liberal	J. Little*	uncontested		
Liberal hold		Swing		

=== Ardwick ===
Ardwick
Party	Candidate	Votes	%	±%
Liberal	J. Thompson*	uncontested		
Liberal hold		Swing		

=== Cheetham ===
Cheetham
Party	Candidate	Votes	%	±%
Liberal	J. Ashton*	uncontested		
Liberal hold		Swing		

=== Collegiate Church ===
Collegiate Church
Party	Candidate	Votes	%	±%
Conservative	W. Griffin*	uncontested		
Conservative hold		Swing		

=== Exchange ===
Exchange
Party	Candidate	Votes	%	±%
Liberal	G. Booth*	uncontested		
Liberal hold		Swing		

=== Medlock Street ===
Medlock Street
Party	Candidate	Votes	%	±%
Conservative	J. Craven*	uncontested		
Conservative hold		Swing		

=== New Cross ===
New Cross
Party	Candidate	Votes	%	±%
Conservative	H. Shaw*	uncontested		
Liberal	W. Smith*	uncontested		
Conservative hold		Swing		
Liberal hold		Swing		

=== Oxford ===
Oxford
Party	Candidate	Votes	%	±%
Liberal	G. Watts	587	55.0	+2.8
Conservative	S. Redfern	480	45.0	−2.8
Majority		107	10.0	+5.6
Turnout		1,067		
Liberal gain from Conservative		Swing		

=== St. Ann's ===
St. Ann's
Party	Candidate	Votes	%	±%
Conservative	J. A. Birch*	uncontested		
Conservative hold		Swing		

=== St. Clement's ===
St. Clement's
Party	Candidate	Votes	%	±%
Liberal	J. W. Southern	uncontested		
Liberal gain from Conservative		Swing		

=== St. George's ===
St. George's
Party	Candidate	Votes	%	±%
Liberal	W. Mather*	uncontested		
Liberal hold		Swing		

=== St. James' ===
St. James'
Party	Candidate	Votes	%	±%
Liberal	J. Spencer*	uncontested		
Liberal hold		Swing		

=== St. John's ===
St. John's
Party	Candidate	Votes	%	±%
Conservative	W. Robinson	uncontested		
Conservative hold		Swing		

=== St. Luke's ===
St. Luke's
Party	Candidate	Votes	%	±%
Liberal	W. Scott Brown*	uncontested		
Liberal hold		Swing		

=== St. Michael's ===
St. Michael's
Party	Candidate	Votes	%	±%
Conservative	G. Moulton*	uncontested		
Conservative hold		Swing		
