= Cheetham (ward) =

- Ward
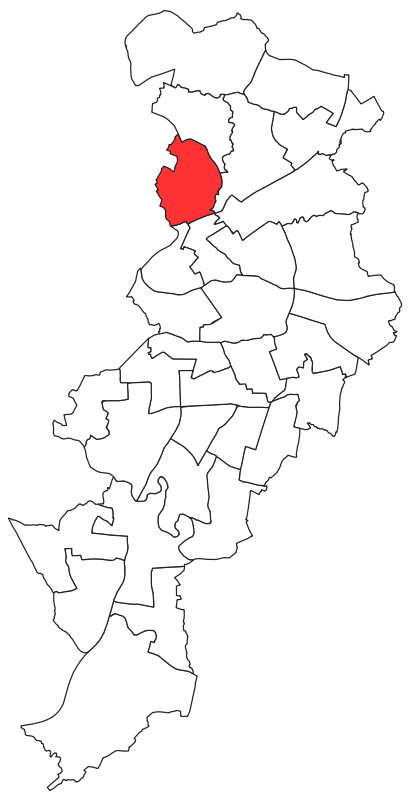
- Cheetham ward (2018) within Manchester

- Coat of arms
- Country: United Kingdom
- Constituent country: England
- Region: North West England
- County: Greater Manchester
- Metropolitan borough: Manchester
- Created: December 1838
- Named for: Cheetham

Government
  - Type: Unicameral
  - Body: Manchester City Council
- UK Parliamentary Constituency: Manchester Central

Cheetham is an electoral division of Manchester City Council which has been represented since 1838. It covers Cheetham to the north of Manchester city centre.

== Overview ==
Cheetham ward was one of the fifteen municipal wards created in 1838, when the Manchester Borough Council was granted a Charter of Incorporation under the provisions of the Municipal Corporations Act 1835.

Initially, the ward covered the former township of Cheetham, which had been absorbed into Manchester by the borough's Charter of Incorporation. Its original boundaries remained in place until 1919 when that part of the ward to the south of Elizabeth Street was transferred to the Collegiate Church ward. Further boundary revisions in 1950 and 1971 transferred more of Cheetham ward to the Collegiate Church ward. Another revision in 1982 transferred that part of the former Collegiate Church ward north of the Lancashire and Yorkshire Railway to the Cheetham ward, these boundaries were largely unaffected by the city-wide boundary revision of 2004. At the latest revision in 2018, the ward's north-eastern boundary became the Bury Line of the Manchester Metrolink.

From 1838 until 1885, the ward formed part of the Manchester Parliamentary constituency. From 1885 until 1918, it was part of the Manchester North West Parliamentary constituency. From 1918 until 1950, it was part of the Manchester Exchange Parliamentary constituency. From 1950 until 1974, it was part of the Manchester Cheetham Constituency before being transferred to the new Manchester Central constituency until 2010. From 2010 until 2024, it was part of the Blackley and Broughton Parliamentary constituency. As of 2024, it has returned to the Manchester Central Parliamentary constituency.

== Councillors ==
Election	Councillor	Councillor	Councillor
1838	Thomas Hopkins (Lib)	John Harrison (Lib)	George Heywood (Lib)
1839	Thomas Hopkins (Lib)	John Harrison (Lib)	George Heywood (Lib)
1840	Thomas Hopkins (Lib)	John Harrison (Lib)	George Heywood (Lib)
1841	Thomas Hopkins (Lib)	John Harrison (Lib)	George Heywood (Lib)
1842	Thomas Hopkins (Lib)	John Harrison (Lib)	William Shuttleworth (Lib)
1843	Thomas Hopkins (Lib)	James Bradford (Lib)	William Shuttleworth (Lib)
1844	Thomas Diggles (Lib)	James Bradford (Lib)	William Shuttleworth (Lib)
1845	Thomas Diggles (Lib)	James Bradford (Lib)	William Shuttleworth (Lib)
(1845–1872)
1872	J. Ashton (Lib)	J. Croston (Con)	J. J. Harwood (Lib)
1873	J. Ashton (Lib)	J. Croston (Con)	J. J. Harwood (Lib)
1874	J. Ashton (Lib)	J. Croston (Con)	J. J. Harwood (Lib)
1875	J. Ashton (Lib)	J. Croston (Con)	J. J. Harwood (Lib)
1876	J. Ashton (Lib)	J. Croston (Con)	J. J. Harwood (Lib)
1877	J. Ashton (Lib)	J. Croston (Con)	J. J. Harwood (Lib)
1878	J. Ashton (Lib)	J. Croston (Con)	J. J. Harwood (Lib)
1879	J. Ashton (Lib)	J. Croston (Con)	J. J. Harwood (Lib)
1880	J. Ashton (Lib)	J. Croston (Con)	J. J. Harwood (Lib)
1881	J. Ashton (Lib)	J. Croston (Con)	H. Boddington (Con)
1882	J. Ashton (Lib)	W. Holt (Lib)	H. Boddington (Con)
1883	J. Rushworth (Lib)	W. Holt (Lib)	H. Boddington (Con)
1884	J. Rushworth (Lib)	W. Holt (Lib)	H. Boddington (Con)
1885	J. Rushworth (Lib)	W. Holt (Lib)	H. Boddington (Con)
1886	J. Rushworth (Lib)	W. Holt (Lib)	H. Boddington (Con)
1887	J. Rushworth (Lib)	W. Holt (Lib)	H. Boddington (Con)
1888	J. Rushworth (Lib)	J. Hampson (Con)	H. Boddington (Con)
1889	J. Rushworth (Lib)	J. Hampson (Con)	H. Boddington (Con)
1890	J. Rushworth (Lib)	J. Hampson (Con)	H. Boddington (Con)
1891	J. Rushworth (Lib)	J. Hampson (Con)	H. Boddington (Con)
April 1892	J. Rushworth (Lib)	J. Hampson (Con)	C. H. Braddon (Con)
1892	J. Rushworth (Lib)	J. Hampson (Con)	C. H. Braddon (Con)
November 1892	J. E. Phythian (Lib)	J. Hampson (Con)	C. H. Braddon (Con)
1893	J. E. Phythian (Lib)	J. Hampson (Con)	C. H. Braddon (Con)
1894	J. E. Phythian (Lib)	J. Hampson (Con)	C. H. Braddon (Con)
1895	J. E. Phythian (Lib)	J. Hampson (Con)	C. H. Braddon (Con)
1896	J. E. Phythian (Lib)	J. Hampson (Con)	C. H. Braddon (Con)
1897	J. E. Phythian (Lib)	J. Hampson (Con)	C. H. Braddon (Con)
1898	J. Hodge (Lib)	J. Hampson (Con)	C. H. Braddon (Con)
1899	J. Hodge (Lib)	J. Hampson (Con)	C. H. Braddon (Con)
1900	J. Hodge (Lib)	J. Halliday (Lib)	C. H. Braddon (Con)
1901	J. Williams (Con)	J. Halliday (Lib)	C. H. Braddon (Con)
1902	J. Williams (Con)	J. Halliday (Lib)	R. Oliver (Con)
1903	J. Williams (Con)	J. Halliday (Lib)	R. Oliver (Con)
1904	J. Williams (Con)	J. Halliday (Lib)	R. Oliver (Con)
1905	J. Williams (Con)	J. Halliday (Lib)	R. Oliver (Con)
1906	J. Williams (Con)	C. A. Wood (Con)	R. Oliver (Con)
1907	J. Williams (Con)	C. A. Wood (Con)	R. Oliver (Con)
1908	J. Williams (Con)	C. A. Wood (Con)	H. E. Howell (Con)
November 1908	J. J. Kendall (Lib)	C. A. Wood (Con)	H. E. Howell (Con)
1909	J. J. Kendall (Lib)	C. A. Wood (Con)	H. E. Howell (Con)
1910	J. J. Kendall (Lib)	C. A. Wood (Con)	H. E. Howell (Con)
1911	J. J. Kendall (Lib)	C. A. Wood (Con)	A. Whitworth (Con)
1912	J. J. Kendall (Lib)	C. A. Wood (Con)	A. Whitworth (Con)
1913	J. J. Kendall (Lib)	C. A. Wood (Con)	A. Whitworth (Con)
1914	J. J. Kendall (Lib)	C. A. Wood (Con)	A. Whitworth (Con)
1919	J. J. Kendall (Lib)	C. A. Wood (Con)	A. Whitworth (Con)
1920	J. J. Kendall (Lib)	C. A. Wood (Con)	A. Whitworth (Con)
1921	J. J. Kendall (Lib)	C. A. Wood (Con)	A. Whitworth (Con)
1922	J. J. Kendall (Lib)	C. A. Wood (Con)	A. Whitworth (Con)
December 1922	J. J. Kendall (Lib)	J. C. Kidd (Con)	A. Whitworth (Con)
1923	J. J. Kendall (Lib)	J. C. Kidd (Con)	A. Whitworth (Con)
1924	J. J. Kendall (Lib)	J. C. Kidd (Con)	A. Whitworth (Con)
1925	J. J. Kendall (Lib)	J. C. Kidd (Con)	A. Whitworth (Con)
1926	J. J. Kendall (Lib)	J. C. Kidd (Con)	A. Whitworth (Con)
July 1927	J. C. Grime (Con)	J. C. Kidd (Con)	A. Whitworth (Con)
1927	J. C. Grime (Con)	J. C. Kidd (Con)	A. Whitworth (Con)
1928	J. C. Grime (Con)	J. C. Kidd (Con)	A. Whitworth (Con)
August 1929	J. C. Grime (Con)	J. C. Kidd (Con)	S. Laski (Lib)
1929	J. C. Grime (Con)	J. C. Kidd (Con)	S. Laski (Lib)
1930	J. C. Grime (Con)	J. C. Kidd (Con)	S. Laski (Lib)
1931	J. C. Grime (Con)	J. C. Kidd (Con)	S. Laski (Lib)
March 1932	H. Lomax (Con)	J. C. Kidd (Con)	S. Laski (Lib)
1932	H. Lomax (Con)	J. C. Kidd (Con)	S. Laski (Lib)
1933	H. Lomax (Con)	J. C. Kidd (Con)	S. Laski (Lib)
1934	H. Lomax (Con)	J. C. Kidd (Con)	S. Laski (Lib)
1935	H. Lomax (Con)	J. C. Kidd (Con)	S. Laski (Lib)
1936	H. Lomax (Con)	J. C. Kidd (Con)	S. Laski (Lib)
1937	H. Lomax (Con)	J. C. Kidd (Con)	S. Laski (Lib)
1938	H. Lomax (Con)	J. C. Kidd (Con)	S. Laski (Lib)
1945	F. H. A. Micklewright (Lab)	H. Lomax (Con)	H. Goldstone (Lab)
1946	F. H. A. Micklewright (Lab)	M. P. Pariser (Lab)	H. Goldstone (Lab)
1947	F. H. A. Micklewright (Lab)	M. P. Pariser (Lab)	H. Goldstone (Lab)
1947	F. H. A. Micklewright (Lab)	M. P. Pariser (Lab)	H. Goldstone (Lab)
1949	F. H. A. Micklewright (Lab)	M. P. Pariser (Lab)	H. Goldstone (Lab)
1950	R. B. Prain (Lab)	M. P. Pariser (Lab)	H. Goldstone (Lab)
1951	R. B. Prain (Lab)	M. P. Pariser (Lab)	H. Goldstone (Lab)
1952	R. B. Prain (Lab)	M. P. Pariser (Lab)	H. Goldstone (Lab)
1953	R. B. Prain (Lab)	M. P. Pariser (Lab)	H. Goldstone (Lab)
1954	R. B. Prain (Lab)	M. P. Pariser (Lab)	H. Goldstone (Lab)
1955	R. B. Prain (Lab)	M. P. Pariser (Lab)	H. Goldstone (Lab)
1956	R. B. Prain (Lab)	M. P. Pariser (Lab)	H. Goldstone (Lab)
1957	R. B. Prain (Lab)	M. P. Pariser (Lab)	H. Goldstone (Lab)
1958	R. B. Prain (Lab)	M. P. Pariser (Lab)	H. Goldstone (Lab)
1959	R. B. Prain (Lab)	M. P. Pariser (Lab)	H. Goldstone (Lab)
1960	S. Needoff (Lib)	M. P. Pariser (Lab)	H. Goldstone (Lab)
1961	S. Needoff (Lib)	M. P. Pariser (Lab)	H. Goldstone (Lab)
1962	S. Needoff (Lib)	M. P. Pariser (Lab)	H. Goldstone (Lab)
September 1962	S. Needoff (Lib)	M. P. Pariser (Lab)	M. Needoff (Lib)
1963	B. Lawson (Lab)	M. P. Pariser (Lab)	M. Needoff (Lib)
December 1963	B. Lawson (Lab)	J. Broderick (Lab)	M. Needoff (Lib)
1964	B. Lawson (Lab)	J. Broderick (Lab)	C. Creveul (Lab)
1965	B. Lawson (Lab)	J. Broderick (Lab)	C. Creveul (Lab)
1966	B. Lawson (Lab)	J. Broderick (Lab)	C. Creveul (Lab)
1967	B. Lawson (Lab)	J. Broderick (Lab)	F. E. Meaden (Con)
1968	B. Lawson (Lab)	A. J. Walker (Con)	F. E. Meaden (Con)
1969	A. Fildes (Con)	A. J. Walker (Con)	F. E. Meaden (Con)
1970	A. Fildes (Con)	A. J. Walker (Con)	D. G. Ford (Lab)
1971	D. G. Ford (Lab)	S. V. Shaw (Lab)	J. Broderick (Lab)
1972	D. G. Ford (Lab)	S. V. Shaw (Lab)	J. Broderick (Lab)
1973	J. Broderick (Lab)	D. G. Ford (Lab)	S. V. Shaw (Lab)
1975	J. Broderick (Lab)	D. G. Ford (Lab)	S. V. Shaw (Lab)
1976	J. Broderick (Lab)	D. G. Ford (Lab)	S. V. Shaw (Lab)
1978	J. Broderick (Lab)	D. G. Ford (Lab)	S. V. Shaw (Lab)
1979	J. Broderick (Lab)	D. G. Ford (Lab)	S. V. Shaw (Lab)
1980	J. Broderick (Lab)	D. G. Ford (Lab)	S. V. Shaw (Lab)
1982	S. V. Shaw (Lab)	J. Broderick (Lab)	N. Harris (Lab)
1983	S. V. Shaw (Lab)	J. Broderick (Lab)	N. Harris (Lab)
1984	S. V. Shaw (Lab)	J. McCardell (Lab)	N. Harris (Lab)
1986	S. V. Shaw (Lab)	J. McCardell (Lab)	N. Harris (Lab)
1987	S. V. Shaw (Lab)	J. McCardell (Lab)	N. Harris (Lab)
1988	S. V. Shaw (Lab)	J. McCardell (Lab)	N. Harris (Lab)
1990	M. Pagel (Lab)	J. McCardell (Lab)	N. Harris (Lab)
1991	M. Pagel (Lab)	J. McCardell (Lab)	N. Harris (Lab)
1992	M. Pagel (Lab)	A. Eko (Lab)	N. Harris (Lab)
1994	M. Pagel (Lab)	A. Eko (Lab)	N. Harris (Lab)
1995	M. Pagel (Lab)	A. Eko (Lab)	J. McGuinness (Lab)
1996	M. Pagel (Lab)	C. Olaniyan (Lab)	J. McGuinness (Lab)
1998	M. Pagel (Lab)	C. Olaniyan (Lab)	J. McGuinness (Lab)
September 1998	M. Pagel (Lab)	Q. Afzal (Lib Dem)	J. McGuinness (Lab)
1999	M. Pagel (Lab)	Q. Afzal (Lib Dem)	I. Rizvi (Lab)
2000	M. Pagel (Lab)	A. Khan (Lab)	I. Rizvi (Lab)
2002	M. Pagel (Lab)	A. Khan (Lab)	I. Rizvi (Lab)
2003	M. Pagel (Lab)	A. Khan (Lab)	Q. Afzal (Lib Dem)
2004	Martin Pagel (Lab)	Afzal Khan (Lab)	Imran Rizvi (Lab)
2006	Martin Pagel (Lab)	Afzal Khan (Lab)	Naeem Hassan (Lab)
2007	Martin Pagel (Lab)	Afzal Khan (Lab)	Naeem Hassan (Lab)
2008	Martin Pagel (Lab)	Afzal Khan (Lab)	Naeem Hassan (Lab)
2010	Martin Pagel (Lab)	Afzal Khan (Lab)	Naeem Hassan (Lab)
2011	Martin Pagel (Lab)	Afzal Khan (Lab)	Naeem Hassan (Lab)
2012	Shaukat Ali (Lab)	Afzal Khan (Lab)	Naeem Hassan (Lab)
2014	Shaukat Ali (Lab)	Afzal Khan (Lab)	Naeem Hassan (Lab)
2015	Shaukat Ali (Lab)	Julie Connolly (Lab)	Naeem Hassan (Lab)
2016	Shaukat Ali (Lab)	Julie Connolly (Lab)	Naeem Hassan (Lab)
2018	Naeem Hassan (Lab)	Shaukat Ali (Lab)	Julie Connolly (Lab)
2019	Naeem Hassan (Lab)	Shaukat Ali (Lab)	Shazia Butt (Lab)
2021	Naeem Hassan (Lab)	Shaukat Ali (Lab)	Shazia Butt (Lab)
2022	Naeem Hassan (Lab)	Shaukat Ali (Lab)	Shazia Butt (Lab)
2023	Naeem Hassan (Lab)	Shaukat Ali (Lab)	Shazia Butt (Lab)
2024	Naeem Hassan (Lab)	Shaukat Ali (Lab)	Shazia Butt (Lab)
2026	Naeem Hassan (Lab)	Shaukat Ali (Lab)	Shazia Butt (Lab)

== Elections ==
=== Elections in 2020s ===
==== May 2026 ====
2026
Party	Candidate	Votes	%	±%
Labour	Naeem Hassan*	1,398	33.7	▼49.0
Green	Brian Candeland	1,090	26.3	▲19.8
Independent	Mohammed Ali	943	22.8	New
Workers Party	Sabeena Khan	323	7.8	New
Reform	Samuel Jacobs	270	6.5	New
Liberal Democrats	Roderick Morrison	121	2.9	▼0.7
Majority		308	7.4	▼68.8
Turnout		4,145	29.7	▲5.7
Labour hold		Swing		

==== May 2024 ====
2024
Party	Candidate	Votes	%	±%
Labour	Shaukat Ali*	1,906	49.5	30.2 ▼
Independent	Dawud Ali	1,218	31.6	New
Green	Fesl Reza-Khan	315	8.2	1.7 ▲
Liberal Democrats	Roderick George Donald Morrison	191	5.0	0.9 ▲
Conservative	Patience Assam	150	3.9	5.7 ▼
Communist Future	Edmund Potts	31	0.8	New
Majority		688	17.9	
Rejected ballots		42	1.1	
Turnout		3,853	27.9	
Registered electors		13,818		
Labour hold		Swing	30.9 ▼	

==== May 2023 ====
2023
Party	Candidate	Votes	%	±%
Labour	Shazia Butt*	2,605	80.1	−0.9 ▼
Conservative	Iftikhar Ahmed	291	9.0	6.1 ▲
Green	Ben Dundas	202	6.2	1.3 ▲
Liberal Democrats	Roderick Morrison	128	3.9	0.8 ▲
Majority		2,314	71.1	−5.1 ▼
Rejected ballots		25	0.8	-0.1 ▼
Turnout		3,251	24.5	−5.9 ▼
Registered electors		13,263		
Labour hold		Swing	-6.0 ▼	

==== May 2022 ====
2022
Party	Candidate	Votes	%	±%
Labour	Naeem Hassan*	2,625	82.7	7.7 ▲
Green	Ben Dundas	207	6.5	0.4 ▼
Conservative	Paul Wan	206	6.5	1.0 ▲
Liberal Democrats	Roddy Morrison	113	3.6	1.5 ▼
Majority		2,418	76.2	
Rejected ballots		22		
Turnout		3,151	24.0	7.7 ▼
Registered electors		13,201		
Labour hold		Swing	4.1 ▲	

==== May 2021 ====
2021
Party	Candidate	Votes	%	±%
Labour	Shaukat Ali*	3,061	79.7	9.5 ▼
Conservative	Arbab Khan	369	9.6	3.9 ▲
Green	Ben Dundas	250	6.5	3.6 ▲
Liberal Democrats	Roddy Morrison	159	4.1	1.4 ▲
Majority		2692	70.1	
Rejected ballots		44		
Turnout		3,883	29.47	2.2 ▼
Registered electors		13,178		
Labour hold		Swing	6.7 ▼	

=== Elections in 2010s ===
==== May 2019 ====
2019
Party	Candidate	Votes	%	±%
Labour	Shazia Butt	3,047	81.0	▲10.4
Green	Dave Taylor	183	4.9	▼2.0
Independent	Rafique Malik	150	4.0	n/a
UKIP	James Miller	121	3.2	n/a
Liberal Democrats	Gary McKenna	117	3.1	▼2.0
Conservative	Azmat Husain	109	2.9	▼1.6
Majority		2,864	76.2	▲16.9
Rejected ballots		33	0.88	
Turnout		3,760	30.35	▼1.3
Registered electors		12,390		
Labour hold		Swing	▲6.2	

==== May 2018 ====
2018 (3 vacancies; new boundaries)
Party	Candidate	Votes	%	±%
Labour	Naeem-Ul Hassan*	2,943	75.0	
Labour	Shaukat Ali*	2,755	70.2	
Labour	Julie Connolly*	2,613	66.6	
Green	Dave Taylor	271	6.9	
Conservative	Pamela Goldfine	215	5.5	
Liberal Democrats	Paul Crane	202	5.1	
Conservative	Hannah Levy	186	4.7	
Conservative	Charalampos Kagkouras	132	3.4	
Majority				
Turnout		3,926	31.7	
Labour win (new boundaries)				
Labour win (new boundaries)				
Labour win (new boundaries)				

==== May 2016 ====
2016
Party	Candidate	Votes	%	±%
Labour	Shaukat Ali*	3,485	81.8	+19.5
Conservative	Peter Malcolm Schofield	318	7.5	+2.8
Green	Dave Taylor	225	5.3	−0.4
Liberal Democrats	Arthur Craig Whittall	121	2.8	+/−0.0
TUSC	Catherine Spencer	112	2.6	n/a
Majority		3,167	74.3	
Turnout		4,261	29.19	
Labour hold		Swing		

==== May 2015 ====
2015
Party	Candidate	Votes	%	±%
Labour	Julie Connolly	5,894	78.5	−5.9
Conservative	Peter Malcolm Schofield	783	10.4	+2.1
Green	Anne Vivienne Power	534	7.1	N/A
Liberal Democrats	Arthur Craig Whittall	197	2.6	−4.7
TUSC	Sam Gleaden	102	1.4	N/A
Majority		5,111	68.1	
Turnout		7,510	48.6	+18.4
Labour hold		Swing		

==== May 2014 ====
2014
Party	Candidate	Votes	%	±%
Labour	Naeem Ul Hassan*	3,734	79.62	+25.82
Green	Alex Ian Blythe	530	11.30	N/A
Conservative	Stuart Andrew McKenna	426	9.08	−13.22
Majority		3,204	68.3	
Turnout		4,690	30.5	
Labour hold		Swing		

==== May 2012 ====
2012
Party	Candidate	Votes	%	±%
Labour	Shaukat Ali	2,854	62.3	+12.4
Independent	Shazia Butt	1,121	24.5	N/A
Green	Luke Smith	261	5.7	+1.6
Conservative	Sham Akhtar	213	4.7	−14.6
Liberal Democrats	Rodney Isherwood	130	2.8	−9.5
Majority		1,733	38	
Turnout		4,579	30.64	
Labour hold		Swing		

==== May 2011 ====
2011
Party	Candidate	Votes	%	±%
Labour	Afzal Khan*	3,712	84.4	+19.8
Conservative	Samuel Jacobs	366	8.3	−2.2
Liberal Democrats	Nawaz Ahmed	320	7.3	−8.5
Majority		3,346	76.1	
Turnout		4,398	30.2	
Labour hold		Swing		

==== May 2010 ====
2010
Party	Candidate	Votes	%	±%
Labour	Naeem-Ul Hassan*	3,451	53.8	+3.9
Conservative	Imran Raza Rizvi	1,433	22.3	+3.0
Liberal Democrats	Liaqat Ali	929	14.5	+2.2
Respect	Kay Phillips	607	9.5	−4.9
Majority		2,018	31.4	+0.9
Turnout		6,420	47.9	+18.7
Labour hold		Swing	+0.4	

=== Elections in 2000s ===
==== May 2008 ====
2008
Party	Candidate	Votes	%	±%
Labour	Martin Pagel*	1,735	49.9	−14.7
Conservative	Wajid Ali	673	19.3	+8.8
Respect	Kay Phillips	502	14.4	+14.4
Liberal Democrats	Sham Raja	429	12.3	−3.5
Green	Luke Smith	141	4.1	−5.1
Majority		1,062	30.5	−18.3
Turnout		3,480	29.2	−2.3
Labour hold		Swing	-11.7	

==== May 2007 ====
2007
Party	Candidate	Votes	%	±%
Labour	Mohammed Khan*	2,340	64.6	+19.0
Liberal Democrats	Sham Raja	571	15.8	−27.2
Conservative	Wajid Ali	380	10.5	+5.4
Green	Jackie Smith	332	9.2	+2.9
Majority		1,769	48.8	+46.2
Turnout		3,623	31.5	−4.7
Labour hold		Swing	+23.1	

==== May 2006 ====
2006
Party	Candidate	Votes	%	±%
Labour	Naeem Ul Hassam*	1,707	45.6	+0.8
Liberal Democrats	Qassim Afzal	1,608	43.0	+5.9
Green	Jacqueline Smith	235	6.3	+6.3
Conservative	Kim Elvin Glasspole	191	5.1	+2.4
Majority		99	2.6	−5.1
Turnout		3,741	36.2	−11.0
Labour hold		Swing	-2.5	

==== June 2004 ====
2004 (3 vacancies; new boundaries)
Party	Candidate	Votes	%	±%
Labour	Martin Pagel*	2,184	46.9	
Labour	Mohammed Khan*	2,177	46.8	
Labour	Imran Rizvi	1,921	41.3	
Liberal Democrats	Qassim Afzal*	1,806	38.8	
Liberal Democrats	Mohammed Sabir	1,419	30.5	
Liberal Democrats	Ibrar Hussain	1,412	30.3	
Respect	Kay Phillips	519	11.1	
Conservative	Dorothy Keller	366	7.9	
Majority		115	2.5	
Turnout		4,655	47.2	
Labour win (new seat)				
Labour win (new seat)				
Labour win (new seat)				

==== May 2003 ====
2003
Party	Candidate	Votes	%	±%
Liberal Democrats	Qassim Afzal	1,522	49.4	+3.4
Labour	Imran Rizvi*	1,305	42.4	−8.5
Conservative	Adrian Glasspole	143	4.6	+4.6
Green	Charlotte Daws	110	3.6	+0.5
Majority		217	7.0	+2.1
Turnout		3,080	33.0	−3.0
Liberal Democrats gain from Labour		Swing	+5.9	

==== May 2002 ====
2002
Party	Candidate	Votes	%	±%
Labour	Martin Pagel*	1,702	50.9	−1.1
Liberal Democrats	Qassim Afzal	1,539	46.0	+1.1
Green	Joe Sheedy	105	3.1	0
Majority		163	4.9	−2.2
Turnout		3,346	36.0	+0.2
Labour hold		Swing	-1.1	

==== May 2000 ====
2000
Party	Candidate	Votes	%	±%
Labour	Mohammed Khan	1,602	52.0	−10.5
Liberal Democrats	Qassim Afzal*	1,382	44.9	+14.3
Green	Ashleigh Vincent	96	3.1	+1.3
Majority		220	7.1	−24.8
Turnout		3,080	35.8	+4.0
Labour gain from Liberal Democrats		Swing	-12.4	

=== Elections in 1990s ===
==== May 1999 ====
1999
Party	Candidate	Votes	%	±%
Labour	Imran Rizvi	1,799	62.5	+15.8
Liberal Democrats	Mohammed Sabir	882	30.6	−13.8
Conservative	Adam Gibson	132	4.6	−2.5
Green	Paddy McCloy	53	1.8	+1.8
Independent	Ahmed Zubair	13	0.5	−1.2
Majority		917	31.9	+29.6
Turnout		2,879	31.8	
Labour hold		Swing	+14.8	

==== September 1998 (by-election) ====
By-election: 24 September 1998
Party	Candidate	Votes	%	±%
Liberal Democrats	Qassim Afzal	1,394	48.5	+4.1
Labour	Imran Rizvi	1,342	46.6	−0.1
Conservative	Dorothy Keller	141	4.9	−2.2
Majority		52	1.9	−0.4
Turnout		2,877		
Liberal Democrats gain from Labour		Swing	+2.1	

==== May 1998 ====
1998
Party	Candidate	Votes	%	±%
Labour	Martin Pagel*	1,153	46.7	−36.4
Liberal Democrats	Qassim Afzal	1,096	44.4	+38.0
Conservative	Dorothy Keller	176	7.1	+7.1
Independent	Ahmed Zubair	42	1.7	+1.7
Majority		57	2.3	−70.3
Turnout		2,467		
Labour hold		Swing	-37.2	

==== May 1996 ====
1996
Party	Candidate	Votes	%	±%
Labour	Christopher Olaniyan	1,697	83.1	+4.7
Liberal	Richard Wilson	215	10.5	+4.9
Liberal Democrats	G. Epps	130	6.4	+1.8
Majority		1,482	72.6	+1.4
Turnout		2,042		
Labour hold		Swing	-0.1	

==== May 1995 ====
1995
Party	Candidate	Votes	%	±%
Labour	John McGuinness	1,806	78.4	−1.1
Conservative	Rodney Keller	166	7.2	−2.8
Liberal	Richard Wilson	129	5.6	+5.6
Liberal Democrats	Richard Clayton	106	4.6	−5.9
Independent	George Taylor	69	3.0	+3.0
Green	D. Wild	27	1.2	+1.2
Majority		1,640	71.2	+2.3
Turnout		2,303		
Labour hold		Swing	+0.8	

==== May 1994 ====
1994
Party	Candidate	Votes	%	±%
Labour	M. Pagel*	1,904	79.5	+10.7
Liberal Democrats	R. Clayton	252	10.5	−1.2
Conservative	M. Gifford	240	10.0	−9.4
Majority		1,652	68.9	+19.5
Turnout		2,396		
Labour hold		Swing	+5.9	

==== May 1992 ====
1992
Party	Candidate	Votes	%	±%
Labour	A. Eko	1,201	68.8	−4.5
Conservative	K. Hyde	339	19.4	+8.1
Liberal Democrats	R. Clayton	205	11.7	+1.6
Majority		862	49.4	−12.6
Turnout		1,745		
Labour hold		Swing	-6.3	

==== May 1991 ====
1991
Party	Candidate	Votes	%	±%
Labour	N. Harris*	1,938	73.3	−8.2
Conservative	D. K. Shenoy	299	11.3	+11.3
Liberal Democrats	V. Towers	267	10.1	−8.4
Green	B. J. A. Doherty	139	5.3	+5.3
Majority		1,639	62.0	−0.9
Turnout		2,643	28.1	
Labour hold		Swing	-9.7	

==== May 1990 ====
1990
Party	Candidate	Votes	%	±%
Labour	M. Pagel	2,460	81.5	+3.4
Liberal Democrats	S. A. Lewis	560	18.5	+10.8
Majority		1,900	62.9	−0.9
Turnout		3,020		
Labour hold		Swing	-3.7	

=== Elections in 1980s ===
==== May 1988 ====
1988
Party	Candidate	Votes	%	±%
Labour	J. McCardell*	2,484	78.1	+25.8
Conservative	R. T. L. Berg	453	14.2	+14.2
SLD	S. A. Lewis	245	7.7	−13.8
Majority		2,031	63.8	+37.7
Turnout		3,182		
Labour hold		Swing	+5.8	

==== May 1987 ====
1987
Party	Candidate	Votes	%	±%
Labour	Nicholas Harris*	1,452	52.3	−27.6
Independent	Sydney Laserson	727	26.2	+26.2
SDP	Barry McColgan	596	21.5	+1.4
Majority		725	26.1	−33.7
Turnout		2,775		
Labour hold		Swing	-26.9	

==== May 1986 ====
1986
Party	Candidate	Votes	%	±%
Labour	S. Shaw*	2,674	79.9	+11.9
SDP	R. Harrison	673	20.1	−2.8
Majority		2,001	59.8	+14.8
Turnout		3,347		
Labour hold		Swing	+7.3	

==== May 1984 ====
1984
Party	Candidate	Votes	%	±%
Labour	J. McCardell	2,560	68.0	+1.3
SDP	K. Evans	863	22.9	+4.0
Conservative	P. Martyniuk	344	9.1	−5.3
Majority		1,697	45.0	−2.8
Turnout		3,767		
Labour hold		Swing	-1.3	

==== May 1983 ====
1983
Party	Candidate	Votes	%	±%
Labour	Nick Harris*	2,560	66.7	+5.4
SDP	Muhammad Qureshi	726	18.9	−4.4
Conservative	Veronica Jones	551	14.4	−1.0
Majority		1,834	47.8	+9.9
Turnout		3,837		
Labour hold		Swing	+4.9	

==== May 1982 ====
1982 (3 vacancies; new boundaries)
Party	Candidate	Votes	%	±%
Labour	Sally Shaw*	2,031	58.8	
Labour	John Broderick*	1,996	57.8	
Labour	Nicholas Harris	1,912	55.3	
SDP	Mohammed Aslam	775	22.4	
SDP	John Czernenko	723	20.9	
SDP	John Whitman	656	19.0	
Conservative	Russell Berg	508	14.7	
Conservative	David Philip	492	14.2	
Conservative	David Sparrow	469	13.6	
Majority		1,137	32.9	
Turnout		3,455	34.1	
Labour win (new seat)				
Labour win (new seat)				
Labour win (new seat)				

==== May 1980 ====
1980
Party	Candidate	Votes	%	±%
Labour	D. G. Ford*	1,785	71.6	+5.5
Conservative	K. Taylor	613	24.6	−3.8
Liberal	R. A. Bell	94	3.8	−1.7
Majority		1,172	47.0	+9.3
Turnout		2,492	34.4	−31.1
Labour hold		Swing	+4.6	

=== Elections in 1970s ===
==== May 1979 ====
1979
Party	Candidate	Votes	%	±%
Labour	S. Shaw*	3,014	66.1	−0.5
Conservative	F. Meaden	1,294	28.4	−5.0
Liberal	S. O. Mousah	250	5.5	+5.5
Majority		1,720	37.7	+4.5
Turnout		4,558	65.5	+37.0
Labour hold		Swing	+2.2	

==== May 1978 ====
1978
Party	Candidate	Votes	%	±%
Labour	J. Broderick*	1,482	66.6	+4.1
Conservative	F. Meaden	743	33.4	−4.1
Majority		739	33.2	+8.2
Turnout		2,225	28.5	
Labour hold		Swing	+4.1	

==== May 1976 ====
1976
Party	Candidate	Votes	%	±%
Labour	D. G. Ford*	1,421	62.5	+0.3
Conservative	A. Goulding	852	37.5	−0.3
Majority		569	25.0	+0.6
Turnout		2,273		
Labour hold		Swing	+0.3	

==== May 1975 ====
1975
Party	Candidate	Votes	%	±%
Labour	S. Shaw*	1,130	62.2	−5.6
Conservative	N. Green	687	37.8	+5.6
Majority		443	24.4	−11.2
Turnout		1,817		
Labour hold		Swing	-5.6	

==== May 1973 ====
1973 (3 vacancies; reorganisation)
Party	Candidate	Votes	%	±%
Labour	J. Broderick*	1,182	65.5	+1.0
Labour	D. G. Ford*	1,158	64.2	−0.3
Labour	S. V. Shaw*	1,101	61.0	−3.5
Conservative	J. Bonsu	561	31.1	−4.4
Conservative	K. A. Hunt	561	31.1	−4.4
Conservative	R. A. Price	521	28.9	−6.6
Majority		540	29.9	+0.9
Turnout		1,804		
Labour hold		Swing		
Labour hold		Swing		
Labour hold		Swing		

==== May 1972 ====
1972
Party	Candidate	Votes	%	±%
Labour	J. Broderick*	1,297	64.5	−9.1
Conservative	F. E. Meaden	714	35.5	+8.1
Majority		583	29.0	−14.3
Turnout		2,011		
Labour hold		Swing		

==== May 1971 ====
1971 (3 vacancies; new boundaries)
Party	Candidate	Votes	%	±%
Labour	D. G. Ford*	2,100	73.6	
Labour	S. V. Shaw*	2,068	72.4	
Labour	J. Broderick*	2,018	70.7	
Conservative	A. Fildes	783	27.4	
Conservative	F. E. Meaden	772	27.0	
Conservative	A. E. Welsby	693	24.3	
Communist	M. E. Hooley	132	4.6	
Majority		1,235	43.3	
Turnout		2,855		
Labour win (new seat)				
Labour win (new seat)				
Labour win (new seat)				

==== May 1970 ====
1970
Party	Candidate	Votes	%	±%
Labour	D. G. Ford	1,068	51.3	+8.2
Conservative	F. E. Meaden*	919	44.1	−7.6
Communist	H. Ogden	62	3.0	−2.2
Residents	I. Mackin	33	1.6	N/A
Majority		149	7.2	
Turnout		2,082		
Labour gain from Conservative		Swing		

=== Elections in 1960s ===
==== May 1969 ====
1969
Party	Candidate	Votes	%	±%
Conservative	A. Fildes	1,118	51.7	−6.9
Labour	B. Lawson*	932	43.1	+8.0
Communist	H. Ogden	113	5.2	−1.1
Majority		186	8.6	−14.9
Turnout		2,163		
Conservative gain from Labour		Swing		

==== May 1968 ====
1968
Party	Candidate	Votes	%	±%
Conservative	A. J. Walker	1,171	58.6	+4.4
Labour	J. Broderick*	702	35.1	−5.1
Communist	H. Ogden	126	6.3	+0.7
Majority		469	23.5	+9.5
Turnout		1,999		
Conservative gain from Labour		Swing		

==== May 1967 ====
1967
Party	Candidate	Votes	%	±%
Conservative	F. E. Meaden	1,114	54.2	+27.0
Labour	R. E. Talbot	827	40.2	−8.6
Communist	H. Ogden	115	5.6	+2.5
Majority		287	14.0	
Turnout		2,056		
Conservative gain from Labour		Swing		

==== May 1966 ====
1966
Party	Candidate	Votes	%	±%
Labour	B. Lawson*	1,052	48.8	+7.3
Conservative	F. E. Meaden	586	27.2	+2.2
Liberal	A. F. Sullivan	450	20.9	−12.6
Communist	M. Jones	68	3.1	N/A
Majority		466	21.6	+13.6
Turnout		2,156		
Labour hold		Swing		

==== May 1965 ====
1965
Party	Candidate	Votes	%	±%
Labour	J. Broderick*	1,150	41.5	−5.9
Liberal	S. Needoff	927	33.5	−5.7
Conservative	F. E. Meaden	692	25.0	+11.6
Majority		223	8.0	−0.2
Turnout		2,769		
Labour hold		Swing		

==== May 1964 ====
1964
Party	Candidate	Votes	%	±%
Labour	C. Creveul	1,385	47.4	−1.3
Liberal	M. Needoff*	1,145	39.2	0
Conservative	A. Niman	390	13.4	+1.3
Majority		240	8.2	−1.3
Turnout		2,920		
Labour gain from Liberal		Swing		

==== December 1963 (by-election) ====
By-election: 12 December 1963
Party	Candidate	Votes	%	±%
Labour	J. Broderick	1,155	45.0	−3.7
Liberal	S. Needoff	1,016	39.6	+0.4
Conservative	I. Black	394	15.4	+3.3
Majority		139	5.4	−4.1
Turnout		2,565		
Labour hold		Swing		

==== May 1963 ====
1963
Party	Candidate	Votes	%	±%
Labour	B. Lawson	1,695	48.7	−0.2
Liberal	S. Needoff*	1,363	39.2	−5.4
Conservative	L. Black	423	12.1	+6.9
Majority		332	9.5	+5.2
Turnout		3,481		
Labour gain from Liberal		Swing		

==== September 1962 (by-election) ====
By-election: 13 September 1962
Party	Candidate	Votes	%	±%
Liberal	M. Needoff	1,289	45.6	+1.0
Labour	B. Lawson	1,227	43.4	−5.5
Conservative	K. Rydings	308	11.0	+5.8
Majority		62	2.2	
Turnout		2,824		
Liberal gain from Labour		Swing		

==== May 1962 ====
1962
Party	Candidate	Votes	%	±%
Labour	M. Pariser*	1,723	48.9	−3.1
Liberal	M. Needoff	1,571	44.6	−3.4
Conservative	K. Rydings	185	5.2	N/A
Union Movement	T. J. Kay	47	1.3	N/A
Majority		152	4.3	+0.3
Turnout		3,526		
Labour hold		Swing		

==== May 1961 ====
1961
Party	Candidate	Votes	%	±%
Labour	H. Goldstone*	1,700	52.0	+11.1
Liberal	M. Needoff	1,571	48.0	−11.1
Majority		129	4.0	
Turnout		3,271		
Labour hold		Swing		

==== May 1960 ====
1960
Party	Candidate	Votes	%	±%
Liberal	S. Needoff	2,105	59.1	+14.6
Labour	R. B. Prain*	1,458	40.9	−4.6
Majority		647	18.2	
Turnout		3,563		
Liberal gain from Labour		Swing		

=== Elections in 1950s ===
==== May 1959 ====
1959
Party	Candidate	Votes	%	±%
Labour	M. P. Pariser*	1,650	45.5	−8.8
Liberal	S. Needoff	1,614	44.5	−1.2
Conservative	F. Hargreaves	360	10.0	N/A
Majority		36	1.0	−7.6
Turnout		3,624		
Labour hold		Swing		

==== May 1958 ====
1958
Party	Candidate	Votes	%	±%
Labour	H. Goldstone*	2,095	54.3	+3.3
Liberal	S. Needoff	1,765	45.7	−3.3
Majority		330	8.6	+6.6
Turnout		3,860		
Labour hold		Swing		

==== May 1957 ====
1957
Party	Candidate	Votes	%	±%
Labour	R. B. Prain*	1,883	51.0	+0.7
Liberal	S. Needoff	1,807	49.0	+14.9
Majority		76	2.0	−14.2
Turnout		3,690		
Labour hold		Swing		

==== May 1956 ====
1956
Party	Candidate	Votes	%	±%
Labour	M. P. Pariser*	1,705	50.3	+2.8
Liberal	S. Needoff	1,157	34.1	+4.7
Conservative	M. J. McGregor	529	15.6	−7.5
Majority		548	16.2	−1.9
Turnout		3,391		
Labour hold		Swing		

==== May 1955 ====
1955
Party	Candidate	Votes	%	±%
Labour	H. Goldstone*	1,928	47.5	−2.7
Liberal	S. Needoff	1,192	29.4	+1.4
Conservative	M. V. Sparks	941	23.1	+1.4
Majority		736	18.1	−4.1
Turnout		4,061		
Labour hold		Swing		

==== May 1954 ====
1954
Party	Candidate	Votes	%	±%
Labour	R. B. Prain*	2,102	50.2	+1.3
Liberal	S. Needoff	1,172	28.0	+9.4
Conservative	A. Niman	916	21.8	−10.7
Majority		930	22.2	+5.8
Turnout		4,190		
Labour hold		Swing		

==== May 1953 ====
1953
Party	Candidate	Votes	%	±%
Labour	M. P. Pariser*	2,455	48.9	−14.1
Conservative	E. Mawdsley	1,634	32.5	−4.5
Liberal	S. Needoff	935	18.6	N/A
Majority		821	16.4	−9.6
Turnout		5,024		
Labour hold		Swing		

==== May 1952 ====
1952
Party	Candidate	Votes	%	±%
Labour	H. Goldstone*	3,326	63.0	+22.1
Conservative	E. Mawdsley	1,950	37.0	−3.6
Majority		1,376	26.0	+25.7
Turnout		5,276		
Labour hold		Swing		

==== May 1951 ====
1951
Party	Candidate	Votes	%	±%
Labour	R. B. Prain*	2,066	40.9	−21.1
Conservative	E. Mawdsley	2,052	40.6	−7.5
Liberal	S. Needoff	937	18.5	−16.2
Majority		14	0.3	−6.7
Turnout		5,055		
Labour hold		Swing		

==== May 1950 ====
1950 (2 vacancies; new boundaries)
Party	Candidate	Votes	%	±%
Labour	M. P. Pariser*	2,486	62.0	
Labour	R. B. Prain	2,209	55.1	
Conservative	N. Lee	1,927	48.1	
Liberal	S. Needoff	1,391	34.7	
Majority		282	7.0	
Turnout		4,007		
Labour hold		Swing		
Labour hold		Swing		

=== Elections in 1940s ===
==== May 1949 ====
1949
Party	Candidate	Votes	%	±%
Labour	H. Goldstone*	3,082	40.3	−4.2
Conservative	N. Lee	2,337	30.6	−8.6
Liberal	S. Needoff	1,959	25.6	+13.6
Communist	M. I. Druck	262	3.5	−0.8
Majority		745	9.8	+4.5
Turnout		7,640		
Labour hold		Swing		

==== November 1947 ====
1947
Party	Candidate	Votes	%	±%
Labour	F. H. A. Micklewright*	3,822	44.5	+6.0
Conservative	H. Green	3,365	39.2	+7.5
Liberal	S. Needoff	1,032	12.0	−7.3
Communist	M. I. Druck	371	4.3	−6.2
Majority		457	5.3	−1.5
Turnout		8,590		
Labour hold		Swing		

==== November 1946 ====
1946
Party	Candidate	Votes	%	±%
Labour	M. P. Pariser	2,547	38.5	−15.3
Conservative	P. Chadwick	2,093	31.7	+6.5
Liberal	S. Needoff	1,278	19.3	−1.7
Communist	B. J. Gershman	693	10.5	N/A
Majority		454	6.8	−19.3
Turnout		6,611		
Labour gain from Conservative		Swing		

==== November 1945 ====
1945 (2 vacancies)
Party	Candidate	Votes	%	±%
Labour	H. Goldstone	3,752	53.8	+31.2
Labour	F. H. A. Micklewright	3,578	51.3	+28.7
Conservative	H. G. S. Lorimer*	1,753	25.2	−22.0
Conservative	W. L. Goodfellow	1,748	25.1	−22.1
Liberal	S. Needoff*	1,465	21.0	−9.2
Liberal	R. Phelan	784	11.3	−18.9
Majority		1,825	26.1	
Turnout		6,970	44.3	
Labour gain from Liberal		Swing		
Labour gain from Conservative		Swing		

=== Elections in 1930s ===
==== November 1938 ====
1938
Party	Candidate	Votes	%	±%
Conservative	H. Lomax*	2,085	47.2	+2.2
Liberal	S. Needoff	1,333	30.2	−0.8
Labour	B. J. Gershman	998	22.6	−1.4
Majority		752	17.0	+3.0
Turnout		4,416		
Conservative hold		Swing		

==== November 1937 ====
1937
Party	Candidate	Votes	%	±%
Conservative	J. C. Kidd*	1,859	45.0	N/A
Liberal	S. Needoff	1,277	31.0	−41.7
Labour	R. P. Fisher	990	24.0	−3.3
Majority		582	14.0	
Turnout		4,126		
Conservative hold		Swing		

==== November 1936 ====
1936
Party	Candidate	Votes	%	±%
Liberal	S. Laski*	2,328	72.7	+25.0
Labour	F. Regan	873	27.3	N/A
Majority		1,455	45.4	
Turnout		3,201		
Liberal hold		Swing		

==== November 1935 ====
1935
Party	Candidate	Votes	%	±%
Conservative	H. Lomax*	1,463	52.3	−18.9
Liberal	G. A. Barrow	1,333	47.7	N/A
Majority		130	4.6	−37.8
Turnout		2,796		
Conservative hold		Swing		

==== November 1934 ====
1934
Party	Candidate	Votes	%	±%
Conservative	J. C. Kidd*	1,349	71.2	N/A
Independent	S. Hall	545	28.8	N/A
Majority		804	42.4	
Turnout		1,894		
Conservative hold		Swing		

==== November 1933 ====
1933
Party	Candidate	Votes	%	±%
Liberal	S. Laski*	2,203	82.7	N/A
Labour	H. Goldstone	460	17.3	+6.8
Majority		1,743	65.4	
Turnout		2,663		
Liberal hold		Swing		

==== November 1932 ====
1932
Party	Candidate	Votes	%	±%
Conservative	H. Lomax*	1,928	48.4	N/A
Liberal	P. Smith	1,638	41.1	N/A
Labour	H. Goldstone	416	10.5	N/A
Majority		290	7.3	N/A
Turnout		3,982		
Conservative hold		Swing		

==== March 1932 (by-election) ====
By-election: 15 March 1932
Party	Candidate	Votes	%	±%
Conservative	H. Lomax	1,460	62.4	N/A
Labour	M. Tyler	879	37.6	N/A
Majority		581	24.8	N/A
Turnout		2,339		
Conservative hold		Swing		

==== November 1931 ====
1931
Party	Candidate	Votes	%	±%
Conservative	J. C. Kidd*	uncontested		
Conservative hold		Swing		

==== November 1930 ====
1930
Party	Candidate	Votes	%	±%
Liberal	S. Laski*	3,240	82.3	N/A
Labour	C. E. P. Stott	696	17.7	N/A
Majority		2,544	64.6	N/A
Turnout		3,936		
Liberal hold		Swing		

=== Elections in 1920s ===
==== November 1929 ====
1929
Party	Candidate	Votes	%	±%
Conservative	J. C. Grime*	uncontested		
Conservative hold		Swing		

==== August 1929 (by-election) ====
By-election: 20 August 1929
Party	Candidate	Votes	%	±%
Liberal	S. Laski	1,937	46.6	N/A
Conservative	G. Grimshaw	1,512	36.3	N/A
Labour	A. McIlwrick	711	17.1	N/A
Majority		425	10.3	N/A
Turnout		4,160		
Liberal gain from Conservative		Swing		

==== November 1928 ====
1928
Party	Candidate	Votes	%	±%
Conservative	J. C. Kidd*	uncontested		
Conservative hold		Swing		

==== November 1927 ====
1927
Party	Candidate	Votes	%	±%
Conservative	A. Whitworth*	uncontested		
Conservative hold		Swing		

==== July 1927 (by-election) ====
By-election: 7 July 1927
Party	Candidate	Votes	%	±%
Conservative	J. C. Grime	2,268	47.7	N/A
Liberal	H. A. Nathan	1,480	31.1	−31.4
Labour	L. B. Harrison	1,006	21.2	−16.3
Majority		788	16.6	
Turnout		4,754	55.8	+16.8
Conservative gain from Liberal		Swing		

==== November 1926 ====
1926
Party	Candidate	Votes	%	±%
Liberal	J. J. Kendall*	2,324	62.5	N/A
Labour	L. B. Harrison	1,394	37.5	+1.8
Majority		930	25.0	N/A
Turnout		3,718	39.0	−16.0
Liberal hold		Swing		

==== November 1925 ====
1925
Party	Candidate	Votes	%	±%
Conservative	J. C. Kidd*	3,006	64.3	N/A
Labour	J. T. Abbott	1,672	35.7	N/A
Majority		1,334	28.6	N/A
Turnout		4,678	55.0	N/A
Conservative hold		Swing		

==== November 1924 ====
1924
Party	Candidate	Votes	%	±%
Conservative	A. Whitworth*	uncontested		
Conservative hold		Swing		

==== November 1923 ====
1923
Party	Candidate	Votes	%	±%
Liberal	J. J. Kendall*	uncontested		
Liberal hold		Swing		

==== December 1922 (by-election) ====
By-election: 19 December 1922
Party	Candidate	Votes	%	±%
Conservative	J. C. Kidd	1,707	59.3	N/A
Labour	E. J. Hookway	1,173	40.7	N/A
Majority		5344	18.6	N/A
Turnout		2,880		
Conservative hold		Swing		

==== November 1922 ====
1922
Party	Candidate	Votes	%	±%
Conservative	C. A. Wood*	uncontested		
Conservative hold		Swing		

==== November 1921 ====
1921
Party	Candidate	Votes	%	±%
Conservative	A. Whitworth*	2,694	61.7	N/A
Labour	C. Kean	1,671	38.3	+3.2
Majority		1,023	23.4	
Turnout		4,365	53.9	+0.4
Conservative hold		Swing		

==== November 1920 ====
1920
Party	Candidate	Votes	%	±%
Liberal	J. J. Kendall*	2,881	64.9	N/A
Labour	C. Kean	1,558	35.1	N/A
Majority		1,323	29.8	N/A
Turnout		4,439	53.5	N/A
Liberal hold		Swing		

=== Elections in 1910s ===
==== November 1919 ====
1919 (new boundaries)
Party	Candidate	Votes	%	±%
Conservative	C. A. Wood*	uncontested		
Conservative hold		Swing		

==== November 1914 ====
1914
Party	Candidate	Votes	%	±%
Conservative	A. Whitworth*	uncontested		
Conservative hold		Swing		

==== November 1913 ====
1913
Party	Candidate	Votes	%	±%
Liberal	J. J. Kendall*	uncontested		
Liberal hold		Swing		

==== November 1912 ====
1912
Party	Candidate	Votes	%	±%
Conservative	C. A. Wood*	uncontested		
Conservative hold		Swing		

==== November 1911 ====
1911
Party	Candidate	Votes	%	±%
Conservative	A. Whitworth*	1,616	59.7	N/A
Liberal	R. Lewis	1,089	40.3	N/A
Majority		527	19.4	N/A
Turnout		2,705		
Conservative hold		Swing		

==== November 1910 ====
1910
Party	Candidate	Votes	%	±%
Liberal	J. J. Kendall*	uncontested		
Liberal hold		Swing		

=== Elections in 1900s ===
==== November 1909 ====
1909
Party	Candidate	Votes	%	±%
Conservative	C. A. Wood*	1,627	53.0	+0.3
Liberal	E. M. Powell	1,440	47.0	+2.8
Majority		187	6.0	−1.5
Turnout		3,067		
Conservative hold		Swing		

==== November 1908 (by-election) ====
By-election: 27 November 1908
Party	Candidate	Votes	%	±%
Liberal	J. J. Kendall	1,774	56.8	+12.6
Conservative	R. E. Boardman	1,351	43.2	−9.5
Majority		423	13.6	
Turnout		3,125		
Liberal gain from Conservative		Swing		

==== November 1908 ====
1908
Party	Candidate	Votes	%	±%
Conservative	H. E. Howell*	1,719	52.7	N/A
Liberal	J. J. Kendall	1,441	44.2	N/A
Labour	M. Barritz	100	3.1	N/A
Majority		278	8.5	N/A
Turnout		3,260		
Conservative hold		Swing		

==== November 1907 ====
1907
Party	Candidate	Votes	%	±%
Conservative	J. Williams*	uncontested		
Conservative hold		Swing		

==== November 1906 ====
1906
Party	Candidate	Votes	%	±%
Conservative	C. A. Wood	1,488	53.1	N/A
Liberal	A. Porter*	1,312	46.9	N/A
Majority		176	6.2	N/A
Turnout		2,800		
Conservative gain from Liberal		Swing		

==== November 1905 ====
1905
Party	Candidate	Votes	%	±%
Conservative	R. Oliver*	uncontested		
Conservative hold		Swing		

==== November 1904 ====
1904
Party	Candidate	Votes	%	±%
Conservative	J. Williams*	uncontested		
Conservative hold		Swing		

==== November 1903 ====
1903
Party	Candidate	Votes	%	±%
Liberal	J. Halliday*	uncontested		
Liberal hold		Swing		

==== November 1902 ====
1902
Party	Candidate	Votes	%	±%
Conservative	R. Oliver*	uncontested		
Conservative hold		Swing		

==== November 1901 ====
1901
Party	Candidate	Votes	%	±%
Conservative	J. Williams	1,225	57.2	+12.6
Liberal	W. Bennett	916	42.8	−12.6
Majority		309	14.4	
Turnout		2,141		
Conservative gain from Liberal		Swing		

==== November 1900 ====
1900
Party	Candidate	Votes	%	±%
Liberal	J. Halliday*	1,447	55.4	N/A
Conservative	R. Oliver	1,166	44.6	−34.9
Majority		281	10.8	
Turnout		2,613		
Liberal hold		Swing		

=== Elections in 1890s ===
==== November 1899 ====
1899
Party	Candidate	Votes	%	±%
Conservative	C. H. Braddon*	1,127	79.5	N/A
Independent	H. Benoliel	290	20.5	−15.9
Majority		837	59.0	
Turnout		1,417		
Conservative hold		Swing		

==== November 1898 ====
1898
Party	Candidate	Votes	%	±%
Liberal	J. Hodge	715	63.6	N/A
Independent	T. Grindley	410	36.4	N/A
Majority		305	27.2	N/A
Turnout		1,125		
Liberal hold		Swing		

==== November 1897 ====
1897
Party	Candidate	Votes	%	±%
Conservative	J. Hampson*	uncontested		
Conservative hold		Swing		

==== November 1896 ====
1896
Party	Candidate	Votes	%	±%
Conservative	C. H. Braddon*	uncontested		
Conservative hold		Swing		

==== November 1895 ====
1895
Party	Candidate	Votes	%	±%
Liberal	J. E. Phythian*	uncontested		
Liberal hold		Swing		

==== November 1894 ====
1894
Party	Candidate	Votes	%	±%
Conservative	J. Hampson*	1,508	65.8	N/A
Liberal	R. Ramsbottom	784	34.2	N/A
Majority		724	31.6	N/A
Turnout		2,292		
Conservative hold		Swing		

==== November 1893 ====
1893
Party	Candidate	Votes	%	±%
Conservative	C. H. Braddon*	uncontested		
Conservative hold		Swing		

==== November 1892 (by-election) ====
By-election: 23 November 1892
Party	Candidate	Votes	%	±%
Liberal	J. E. Phythian	1,235	53.1	N/A
Conservative	W. E. Husband	1,092	46.9	N/A
Majority		143	6.2	N/A
Turnout		2,327		
Liberal hold		Swing		

==== November 1892 ====
1892
Party	Candidate	Votes	%	±%
Liberal	J. Rushworth*	uncontested		
Liberal hold		Swing		

==== April 1892 (by-election) ====
By-election: 13 April 1892
Party	Candidate	Votes	%	±%
Conservative	C. H. Braddon	uncontested		
Conservative hold		Swing		

==== November 1891 ====
1891
Party	Candidate	Votes	%	±%
Conservative	J. Hampson*	1,514	62.1	N/A
Liberal	G. Hampson	923	37.9	N/A
Majority		591	24.2	N/A
Turnout		2,436		
Conservative hold		Swing		

==== November 1890 ====
1890
Party	Candidate	Votes	%	±%
Conservative	H. Boddington*	uncontested		
Conservative hold		Swing		

=== Elections in 1880s ===
==== November 1889 ====
1889
Party	Candidate	Votes	%	±%
Liberal	J. Rushworth*	uncontested		
Liberal hold		Swing		

==== November 1888 ====
1888
Party	Candidate	Votes	%	±%
Conservative	J. Hampson	1,223	53.6	N/A
Liberal	W. H. Withingon	1,057	46.4	N/A
Majority		166	7.2	N/A
Turnout		2,280		
Conservative gain from Liberal		Swing		

==== November 1887 ====
1887
Party	Candidate	Votes	%	±%
Conservative	H. Boddington*	uncontested		
Conservative hold		Swing		

==== November 1886 ====
1886
Party	Candidate	Votes	%	±%
Liberal	J. Rushworth*	1,124	56.9	+3.6
Conservative	J. Hislop	852	43.1	−3.6
Majority		272	13.8	+7.2
Turnout		1,976		
Liberal hold		Swing		

==== November 1885 ====
1885
Party	Candidate	Votes	%	±%
Liberal	W. Holt*	1,278	53.3	+23.1
Conservative	S. P. Bidder	1,119	46.7	−23.1
Majority		159	6.6	
Turnout		2,397		
Liberal hold		Swing		

==== November 1884 ====
1884
Party	Candidate	Votes	%	±%
Conservative	H. Boddington*	1,531	69.8	N/A
Liberal	G. T. Stanley	663	30.2	N/A
Majority		868	39.6	N/A
Turnout		2,194		
Conservative hold		Swing		

==== November 1883 ====
1883
Party	Candidate	Votes	%	±%
Liberal	J. Rushworth*	uncontested		
Liberal hold		Swing		

==== November 1882 ====
1882
Party	Candidate	Votes	%	±%
Liberal	W. Holt	1,219	50.1	N/A
Conservative	J. Croston*	1,214	49.9	N/A
Majority		5	0.2	N/A
Turnout		2,433		
Liberal gain from Conservative		Swing		

==== November 1881 ====
1881
Party	Candidate	Votes	%	±%
Conservative	H. Boddington*	uncontested		
Conservative hold		Swing		

==== November 1880 ====
1880
Party	Candidate	Votes	%	±%
Liberal	J. Ashton*	uncontested		
Liberal hold		Swing		

=== Elections in 1870s ===
==== November 1879 ====
1879
Party	Candidate	Votes	%	±%
Conservative	J. Croston*	uncontested		
Conservative hold		Swing		

==== November 1878 ====
1878
Party	Candidate	Votes	%	±%
Liberal	J. J. Harwood*	uncontested		
Liberal hold		Swing		

==== November 1877 ====
1877
Party	Candidate	Votes	%	±%
Liberal	J. Ashton*	uncontested		
Liberal hold		Swing		

==== November 1876 ====
1876
Party	Candidate	Votes	%	±%
Conservative	J. Croston*	uncontested		
Conservative hold		Swing		

==== November 1875 ====
1875
Party	Candidate	Votes	%	±%
Liberal	J. J. Harwood*	uncontested		
Liberal hold		Swing		

==== November 1874 ====
1874
Party	Candidate	Votes	%	±%
Liberal	J. Ashton*	1,129	52.3	+4.6
Conservative	T. H. Drew	1,028	47.7	−4.6
Majority		101	4.6	
Turnout		2,157		
Liberal hold		Swing		

==== November 1873 ====
1873
Party	Candidate	Votes	%	±%
Conservative	J. Croston*	1,111	52.3	+37.7
Liberal	J. Phythian	1,015	47.7	−37.7
Majority		96	4.6	
Turnout		2,126		
Conservative hold		Swing		

==== November 1872 ====
1872
Party	Candidate	Votes	%	±%
Liberal	J. J. Harwood*	751	85.4	
Conservative	R. Bower	128	14.6	
Majority		623	70.8	
Turnout		879		
Liberal hold		Swing		

=== Elections in 1840s ===
==== November 1845 ====
1845
Party	Candidate	Votes	%	±%
Liberal	William Shuttleworth*	uncontested		
Liberal hold		Swing		

==== November 1844 ====
1844
Party	Candidate	Votes	%	±%
Liberal	Thomas Diggles*	uncontested		
Liberal hold		Swing		

==== November 1843 ====
1843
Party	Candidate	Votes	%	±%
Liberal	James Bradford	104	62.7	N/A
Liberal	John Harrison*	62	37.3	−37.1
Majority		42	25.4	
Turnout		166		
Liberal gain from Liberal		Swing		

==== November 1842 ====
1842
Party	Candidate	Votes	%	±%
Liberal	William Shuttleworth	134	74.4	N/A
Ind. Conservative	Thomas Sugden	46	25.6	N/A
Majority		88	48.8	N/A
Turnout		180		
Liberal hold		Swing		

==== November 1841 ====
1841
Party	Candidate	Votes	%	±%
Liberal	Thomas Hopkins*	uncontested		
Liberal hold		Swing		

==== November 1840 ====
1840
Party	Candidate	Votes	%	±%
Liberal	John Harrison*	uncontested		
Liberal hold		Swing		

=== Elections in 1830s ===
==== November 1839 ====
1839
Party	Candidate	Votes	%	±%
Liberal	George Heywood*	uncontested		
Liberal hold		Swing		

==== December 1838 ====
1838 (3 vacancies)
Party	Candidate	Votes	%	±%
Liberal	Thomas Hopkins	127	100.0	
Liberal	John Harrison	127	100.0	
Liberal	George Heywood	127	100.0	
Turnout		127		
Liberal win (new seat)				
Liberal win (new seat)				
Liberal win (new seat)				

== See also ==
- Manchester City Council
- Manchester City Council elections
