= Fred Brocklehurst =

British political activist

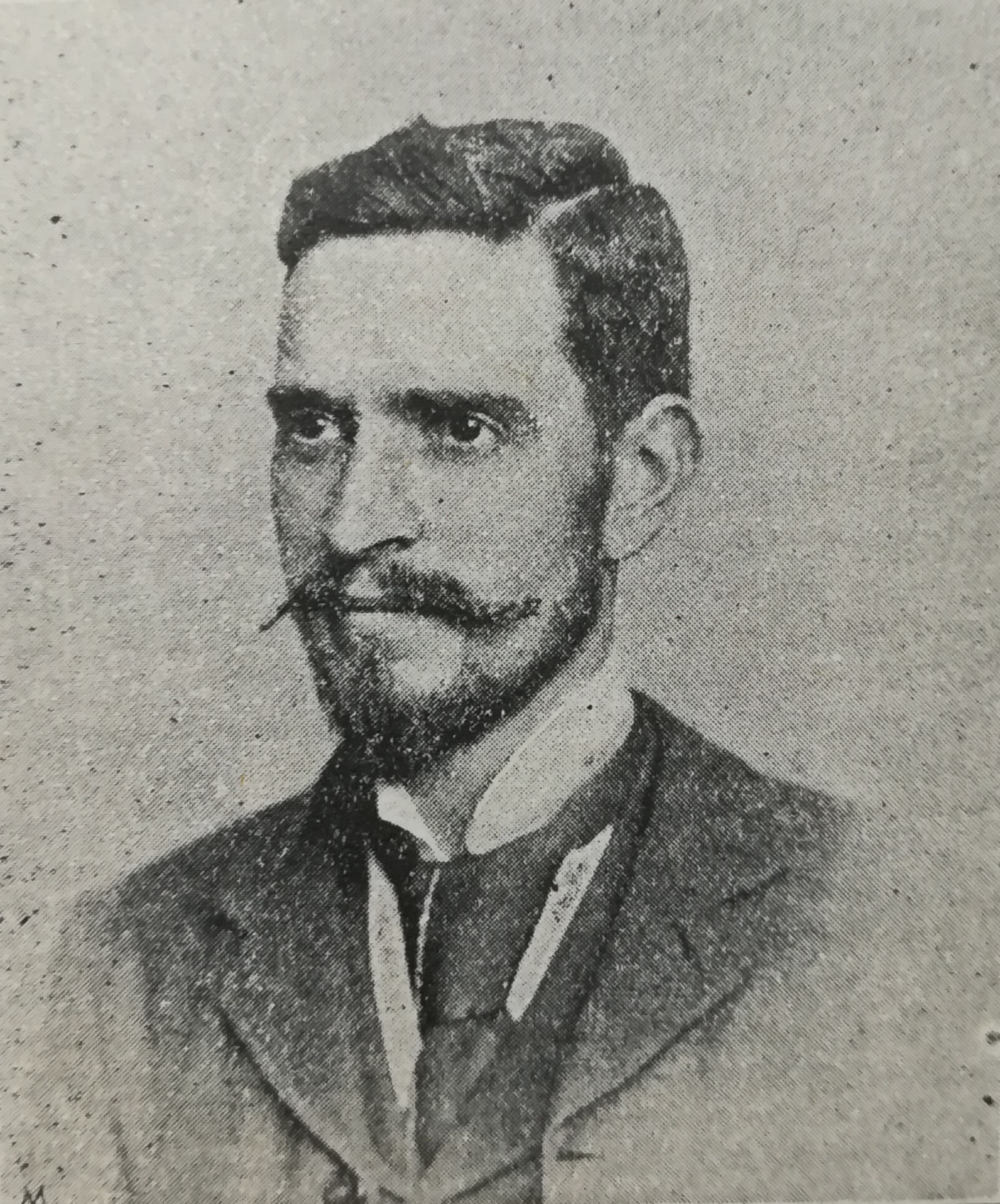
Brocklehurst in 1895

Frederick Brocklehurst (1866–1926) was a British political activist best known for his early involvement in the socialist movement.

Brocklehurst began working in a silk mill when only ten years old. He subsequently worked at the presses of the Manchester Courier newspaper, before obtaining a scholarship to Queens' College, Cambridge, where he graduated in law. An activist in the Labour Church, he returned to Manchester after John Trevor passed the church leadership to him. He was a founder member of the Independent Labour Party (ILP), and in 1894 was elected to its national council.

Brocklehurst stood for the ILP in Bolton at the 1895 general election. In 1896, Brocklehurst was arrested and imprisoned for giving a speech at Boggart Hole Clough Park, on behalf of the ILP. This was in contravention of a controversial new bylaw prohibiting public speaking in Manchester's parks. However, public opinion was with Brocklehurst and in 1897, he was elected to Manchester City Council for Harpurhey Ward, defeating the chairman of the Parks Committee. He was also elected to the Manchester School Board, on which he campaigned against school fees and subsidies for religious schools. He became well known for proposing improved sporting and recreational facilities for the city.

The ILP was one of the organisations which founded the Labour Representation Committee (LRC) in 1900; this organisation later became the Labour Party. Brocklehurst was initially proposed as its secretary, but he withdrew as he was unwilling to move to London, where the LRC would be based. Instead, the less experienced Ramsay MacDonald was chosen. At the 1900 general election, Brocklehurst stood for the Labour Representation Committee in Manchester South West. Brocklehurst advocated for a British victory in the Second Boer War, and this concerned many in the ILP. He was enthusiastically supported by the Manchester Guardian, but not by the official Liberal Party, and was not elected. He threatened to sue any opponent claiming that he was an atheist.

Later in the 1900s, Brocklehurst qualified as a barrister. He defected from the ILP to the Conservative Party, for which he stood unsuccessfully in Prestwich at the December 1910 general election. In 1917, he started a local antisemitic group named "Britain for the British".
