= Bradford (Manchester ward) =

- Ward
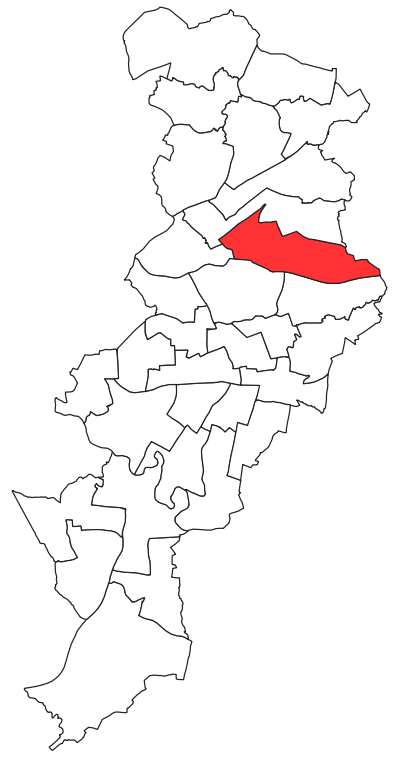
- Bradford ward (2004) within Manchester

- Coat of arms
- Country: United Kingdom
- Constituent country: England
- Region: North West England
- County: Greater Manchester
- Metropolitan borough: Manchester
- Created: November 1885
- Named for: Bradford

Government
  - Type: Unicameral
  - Body: Manchester City Council
- UK Parliamentary Constituency: Manchester Central

Bradford was an electoral division of Manchester City Council which was represented from 1885 until 2018. It covered the Bradford and Openshaw areas of East Manchester.

== Overview ==
Bradford ward was created in 1885, following the Manchester City Extension Act 1885, which transferred the townships of Bradford, Harpurhey, and Rusholme to the Manchester corporation. Initially the ward covered the newly incorporated township of Bradford as well as Beswick which was transferred from the existing Ardwick ward. In 1890, the ward was expanded to include the Clayton area which had been amalgamated with the city as a result of its extension scheme. City-wide boundary revisions in 1919 removed the western portion of the ward to create a new Beswick ward, these boundaries remained in place following a further boundary revision in 1950, while another revision in 1971 transferred most of the former Openshaw ward into Bradford ward. In 1982, that part of the ward to the north of the Ashton Canal was transferred to the new Beswick and Clayton ward, then, following the abolition of that ward in 2004, the Beswick area returned to Bradford ward. In 2018, the ward was abolished, and its remaining area was divided between the new Ancoats and Beswick and Clayton and Openshaw wards.

From its creation until 1918, the ward formed part of the Manchester East Parliamentary constituency. From 1918 until 1955, it was part of the Manchester Clayton Parliamentary constituency. From 1955 until 1983, it was part of the Manchester Openshaw Parliamentary constituency. From 1983 until its abolition, it was part of the Manchester Central Parliamentary constituency.

== Councillors ==
Election	Councillor	Councillor	Councillor
1885	E. Williams (Con)	J. Tunstall (Con)	J. Hutt (Lib)
1886	E. Williams (Con)	J. Tunstall (Con)	J. Hutt (Lib)
1887	E. Williams (Con)	J. Tunstall (Con)	J. Hutt (Lib)
1888	E. Williams (Con)	J. Tunstall (Con)	J. Hutt (Lib)
1889	E. Williams (Con)	J. Tunstall (Con)	J. Hutt (Lib)
1890	E. Williams (Con)	J. Tunstall (Con)	J. Hutt (Lib)
1891	E. Williams (Con)	J. Tunstall (Con)	J. Hutt (Lib)
1892	E. Williams (Con)	J. Tunstall (Con)	J. Hutt (Lib)
1893	E. Williams (Con)	J. Tunstall (Con)	J. Hutt (Lib)
1894	J. E. Sutton (ILP)	J. Tunstall (Con)	J. Hutt (Lib)
1895	J. E. Sutton (ILP)	J. Tunstall (Con)	J. Hutt (Lib)
1896	J. E. Sutton (ILP)	J. Tunstall (Con)	J. Hutt (Lib)
February 1897	J. E. Sutton (ILP)	C. Dreyfus (Con)	J. Hutt (Lib)
August 1897	J. E. Sutton (ILP)	C. Dreyfus (Con)	H. Grimshaw (Lib)
1897	J. E. Sutton (ILP)	C. Dreyfus (Con)	H. Grimshaw (Lib)
1898	J. E. Sutton (ILP)	C. Dreyfus (Con)	H. Grimshaw (Lib)
1899	J. E. Sutton (ILP)	C. Dreyfus (Con)	H. Grimshaw (Lib)
1900	J. E. Sutton (Lab)	C. Dreyfus (Con)	H. Grimshaw (Lib)
1901	J. E. Sutton (Lab)	C. Dreyfus (Con)	H. Grimshaw (Lib)
1902	J. E. Sutton (Lab)	C. Dreyfus (Con)	H. Grimshaw (Lib)
1903	J. E. Sutton (Lab)	C. Dreyfus (Con)	H. Grimshaw (Lib)
February 1904	J. E. Sutton (Lab)	C. Dreyfus (Con)	T. Fox (Lab)
1904	J. E. Sutton (Lab)	C. Dreyfus (Con)	T. Fox (Lab)
1905	J. E. Sutton (Lab)	J. Billam (Lab)	T. Fox (Lab)
1906	J. E. Sutton (Lab)	J. Billam (Lab)	T. Fox (Lab)
1907	J. E. Sutton (Lab)	J. Billam (Lab)	T. Fox (Lab)
1908	J. E. Sutton (Lab)	J. Billam (Lab)	T. Fox (Lab)
1909	J. E. Sutton (Lab)	J. Billam (Lab)	T. Fox (Lab)
1910	J. E. Sutton (Lab)	J. Billam (Lab)	T. Fox (Lab)
November 1910	T. L. Morris (Lib)	J. Billam (Lab)	T. Fox (Lab)
1911	T. L. Morris (Lib)	J. Billam (Lab)	T. Fox (Lab)
July 1912	G. W. Pendlebury (Con)	J. Billam (Lab)	T. Fox (Lab)
1912	G. W. Pendlebury (Con)	J. Billam (Lab)	T. Fox (Lab)
1913	G. W. Pendlebury (Con)	J. Billam (Lab)	T. Fox (Lab)
1914	G. W. Pendlebury (Con)	J. Billam (Lab)	T. Fox (Lab)
May 1919	G. W. Pendlebury (Con)	J. Binns (Lab)	E. J. Hart (Lab)
1919	J. W. Sutton (Lab)	J. Binns (Lab)	E. J. Hart (Lab)
1920	J. W. Sutton (Lab)	J. Binns (Lab)	E. J. Hart (Lab)
1921	J. W. Sutton (Lab)	J. Binns (Lab)	E. J. Hart (Lab)
1922	J. W. Sutton (Lab)	J. Binns (Lab)	E. J. Hart (Lab)
1923	J. W. Sutton (Lab)	J. Binns (Lab)	E. J. Hart (Lab)
1924	J. W. Sutton (Lab)	J. Binns (Lab)	E. J. Hart (Lab)
1925	J. W. Sutton (Lab)	J. Binns (Lab)	E. J. Hart (Lab)
1926	J. W. Sutton (Lab)	J. Binns (Lab)	E. J. Hart (Lab)
1927	J. W. Sutton (Lab)	J. Binns (Lab)	E. J. Hart (Lab)
1928	J. W. Sutton (Lab)	J. Binns (Lab)	E. J. Hart (Lab)
1929	J. W. Sutton (Lab)	J. Binns (Lab)	E. J. Hart (Lab)
1930	J. W. Sutton (Lab)	J. Binns (Lab)	E. J. Hart (Lab)
January 1931	J. W. Sutton (Lab)	S. Bloor (Con)	E. J. Hart (Lab)
1931	F. J. Riley (Con)	S. Bloor (Con)	E. J. Hart (Lab)
1932	F. J. Riley (Con)	S. Bloor (Con)	E. J. Hart (Lab)
1933	F. J. Riley (Con)	R. Malcolm (Lab)	E. J. Hart (Lab)
1934	H. Frankland (Lab)	R. Malcolm (Lab)	E. J. Hart (Lab)
1935	H. Frankland (Lab)	R. Malcolm (Lab)	E. J. Hart (Lab)
January 1936	H. Frankland (Lab)	R. Malcolm (Lab)	E. E. Beavan (Lab)
1936	H. Frankland (Lab)	R. Malcolm (Lab)	E. E. Beavan (Lab)
1937	H. Frankland (Lab)	R. Malcolm (Lab)	E. E. Beavan (Lab)
1938	H. Frankland (Lab)	R. Malcolm (Lab)	E. E. Beavan (Lab)
1945	H. Frankland (Lab)	R. Malcolm (Lab)	E. E. Beavan (Lab)
1946	H. Frankland (Lab)	R. Malcolm (Lab)	E. E. Beavan (Lab)
1947	H. Frankland (Lab)	R. Malcolm (Lab)	E. E. Beavan (Lab)
1949	H. Frankland (Lab)	R. Malcolm (Lab)	E. E. Beavan (Lab)
1950	H. Frankland (Lab)	R. Malcolm (Lab)	E. E. Beavan (Lab)
1951	H. Frankland (Lab)	R. Malcolm (Lab)	E. E. Beavan (Lab)
1952	H. Frankland (Lab)	T. Lomas (Lab)	E. E. Beavan (Lab)
1953	G. McCall (Lab)	T. Lomas (Lab)	E. E. Beavan (Lab)
1954	G. McCall (Lab)	T. Lomas (Lab)	E. E. Beavan (Lab)
July 1954	G. McCall (Lab)	T. Lomas (Lab)	J. Taylor (Lab)
1955	G. McCall (Lab)	T. Lomas (Lab)	J. Taylor (Lab)
1956	G. McCall (Lab)	T. Lomas (Lab)	J. Taylor (Lab)
1957	G. McCall (Lab)	T. Lomas (Lab)	J. Taylor (Lab)
1958	G. McCall (Lab)	T. Lomas (Lab)	J. Taylor (Lab)
1959	G. McCall (Lab)	T. Lomas (Lab)	J. Taylor (Lab)
1960	G. McCall (Lab)	T. Lomas (Lab)	J. Taylor (Lab)
1961	G. McCall (Lab)	T. Lomas (Lab)	J. Taylor (Lab)
1962	J. E. Jackson (Lab)	T. Lomas (Lab)	J. Taylor (Lab)
1963	J. E. Jackson (Lab)	T. Lomas (Lab)	J. Taylor (Lab)
November 1963	J. E. Jackson (Lab)	R. Massey (Lab)	J. Taylor (Lab)
1964	J. E. Jackson (Lab)	R. Massey (Lab)	J. Taylor (Lab)
1965	J. E. Jackson (Lab)	R. Massey (Lab)	J. Taylor (Lab)
1966	J. E. Jackson (Lab)	R. Massey (Lab)	J. Taylor (Lab)
1967	J. E. Jackson (Lab)	R. Massey (Lab)	J. Taylor (Lab)
1968	D. Silverman (Con)	R. Massey (Lab)	J. Taylor (Lab)
1969	D. Silverman (Con)	R. Massey (Lab)	J. Taylor (Lab)
1970	D. Silverman (Con)	R. Massey (Lab)	J. Taylor (Lab)
1971	J. Gilmore (Lab)	J. Taylor (Lab)	W. Egerton (Lab)
July 1971	J. Gilmore (Lab)	R. Massey (Lab)	W. Egerton (Lab)
1972	J. Gilmore (Lab)	R. Massey (Lab)	W. Egerton (Lab)
1973	J. Gilmore (Lab)	W. Egerton (Lab)	E. Grant (Lab)
1975	J. Gilmore (Lab)	W. Egerton (Lab)	E. Grant (Lab)
1976	J. Gilmore (Lab)	W. Egerton (Lab)	E. Grant (Lab)
1978	J. Gilmore (Lab)	W. Egerton (Lab)	E. Grant (Lab)
1979	J. Gilmore (Lab)	W. Egerton (Lab)	E. Grant (Lab)
1980	J. Gilmore (Lab)	W. Egerton (Lab)	E. Grant (Lab)
1982	J. Gilmore (Lab)	E. Grant (Lab)	M. Harrison (Lab)
1983	J. Gilmore (Lab)	E. Grant (Lab)	M. Harrison (Lab)
1984	J. Gilmore (Lab)	C. Heald (Lab)	M. Harrison (Lab)
1986	J. Gilmore (Lab)	C. Heald (Lab)	M. Harrison (Lab)
1987	J. Gilmore (Lab)	C. Heald (Lab)	M. Smith (Lab)
1988	J. Gilmore (Lab)	K. J. Rowswell (Lab)	M. Smith (Lab)
1990	J. Gilmore (Lab)	K. J. Rowswell (Lab)	M. Smith (Lab)
1991	J. Gilmore (Lab)	K. J. Rowswell (Lab)	M. Smith (Lab)
1992	J. Gilmore (Lab)	P. Kelly (Lab)	M. Smith (Lab)
1994	J. Gilmore (Lab)	P. Kelly (Lab)	M. Smith (Lab)
1995	J. Gilmore (Lab)	P. Kelly (Lab)	M. Smith (Lab)
1996	J. Gilmore (Lab)	P. Kelly (Lab)	M. Smith (Lab)
1998	N. Swannick (Lab)	P. Kelly (Lab)	M. Smith (Lab)
1999	N. Swannick (Lab)	P. Kelly (Lab)	P. Fairhurst (Lib Dem)
2000	N. Swannick (Lab)	J. Smith (Lab)	P. Fairhurst (Lib Dem)
2002	N. Swannick (Lab)	J. Smith (Lab)	P. Fairhurst (Lib Dem)
2003	N. Swannick (Lab)	J. Smith (Lab)	J. Longsden (Lab)
2004	Neil Swannick (Lab)	John Smith (Lab)	John Longsden (Lab)
2006	Neil Swannick (Lab)	John Smith (Lab)	John Longsden (Lab)
2007	Neil Swannick (Lab)	Rosa Battle (Lab)	John Longsden (Lab)
2008	Neil Swannick (Lab)	Rosa Battle (Lab)	John Longsden (Lab)
2010	Neil Swannick (Lab)	Rosa Battle (Lab)	John Longsden (Lab)
2011	Neil Swannick (Lab)	Rosa Battle (Lab)	John Longsden (Lab)
2012	Neil Swannick (Lab)	Rosa Battle (Lab)	John Longsden (Lab)
2014	Neil Swannick (Lab)	Rosa Battle (Lab)	John Longsden (Lab)
2015	Neil Swannick (Lab)	Rosa Battle (Lab)	John Longsden (Lab)
2016	Emma Taylor (Lab)	Rosa Battle (Lab)	John Longsden (Lab)

== Elections ==
=== Elections in 1880s ===
==== November 1885 ====
1885 (3 vacancies)
Party	Candidate	Votes	%	±%
Conservative	E. Williams	1,538	65.4	
Conservative	J. Tunstall	1,502	63.8	
Liberal	J. Hutt	1,196	50.8	
Liberal	C. Cooper	1,082	46.0	
Liberal	J. Maudsley	991	42.1	
Independent Liberal	R. W. Bird	749	31.8	
Majority		114	4.8	
Turnout		2,353		
Conservative win (new seat)				
Conservative win (new seat)				
Liberal win (new seat)				

==== November 1886 ====
1886
Party	Candidate	Votes	%	±%
Liberal	J. Hutt*	1,701	53.3	+2.5
Conservative	J. Hislop	1,488	46.7	−18.7
Majority		213	6.6	+1.8
Turnout		3,189		
Liberal hold		Swing		

==== November 1887 ====
1887
Party	Candidate	Votes	%	±%
Conservative	J. Tunstall*	uncontested		
Conservative hold		Swing		

==== November 1888 ====
1888
Party	Candidate	Votes	%	±%
Conservative	E. Williams*	1,562	76.5	N/A
Ind. Nationalist	F. Chappell	338	16.5	N/A
Liberal	W. Connell	143	7.0	N/A
Majority		1,224	60.0	N/A
Turnout		2,043		
Conservative hold		Swing		

==== November 1889 ====
1889
Party	Candidate	Votes	%	±%
Liberal	J. Hutt*	uncontested		
Liberal hold		Swing		

=== Elections in 1890s ===
==== November 1890 ====
1890 (new boundaries)
Party	Candidate	Votes	%	±%
Conservative	J. Tunstall*	uncontested		
Conservative hold		Swing		

==== November 1891 ====
1891
Party	Candidate	Votes	%	±%
Conservative	E. Williams*	uncontested		
Conservative hold		Swing		

==== November 1892 ====
1892
Party	Candidate	Votes	%	±%
Liberal	J. Hutt*	uncontested		
Liberal hold		Swing		

==== November 1893 ====
1893
Party	Candidate	Votes	%	±%
Conservative	J. Tunstall*	uncontested		
Conservative hold		Swing		

==== November 1894 ====
1894
Party	Candidate	Votes	%	±%
Ind. Labour Party	J. E. Sutton	2,072	54.4	N/A
Conservative	E. Williams*	1,737	45.6	N/A
Majority		335	8.8	N/A
Turnout		3,809		
Ind. Labour Party gain from Conservative		Swing		

==== November 1895 ====
1895
Party	Candidate	Votes	%	±%
Liberal	J. Hutt*	2,304	64.2	N/A
Ind. Labour Party	M. Atherton	771	21.5	−32.9
Conservative	J. Russell	515	14.3	−41.3
Majority		1,533	42.7	
Turnout		3,590		
Liberal hold		Swing		

==== November 1896 ====
1896
Party	Candidate	Votes	%	±%
Conservative	J. Tunstall*	uncontested		
Conservative hold		Swing		

==== February 1897 (by-election) ====
By-election: 2 February 1897
Party	Candidate	Votes	%	±%
Conservative	C. Dreyfus	1,992	65.1	N/A
Liberal	J. J. Kearns	1,066	34.9	N/A
Majority		926	30.2	N/A
Turnout		3,058		
Conservative hold		Swing		

==== August 1897 (by-election) ====
By-election: 19 August 1897
Party	Candidate	Votes	%	±%
Liberal	H. Grimshaw	1,487	50.9	+16.0
Conservative	S. L. Keymer	1,434	49.1	−16.0
Majority		53	1.8	
Turnout		2,921		
Liberal hold		Swing		

==== November 1897 ====
1897
Party	Candidate	Votes	%	±%
Ind. Labour Party	J. E. Sutton*	2,378	50.5	N/A
Conservative	S. L. Keymer	2,333	49.5	N/A
Majority		45	1.0	N/A
Turnout		4,711		
Ind. Labour Party hold		Swing		

==== November 1898 ====
1898
Party	Candidate	Votes	%	±%
Liberal	H. Grimshaw*	uncontested		
Liberal hold		Swing		

==== November 1899 ====
1899
Party	Candidate	Votes	%	±%
Conservative	C. Dreyfus*	uncontested		
Conservative hold		Swing		

=== Elections in 1900s ===
==== November 1900 ====
1900
Party	Candidate	Votes	%	±%
Labour	J. E. Sutton*	3,008	68.8	N/A
Conservative	G. Jennison	1,363	31.2	N/A
Majority		1,645	37.6	N/A
Turnout		4,371		
Labour hold		Swing		

==== November 1901 ====
1901
Party	Candidate	Votes	%	±%
Liberal	H. Grimshaw*	uncontested		
Liberal hold		Swing		

==== November 1902 ====
1902
Party	Candidate	Votes	%	±%
Conservative	C. Dreyfus*	2,466	53.9	N/A
Labour	T. Fox	2,110	46.1	N/A
Majority		356	7.8	N/A
Turnout		4,576		
Conservative hold		Swing		

==== November 1903 ====
1903
Party	Candidate	Votes	%	±%
Labour	J. E. Sutton*	2,924	73.8	+27.7
Independent	G. W. Laughton	1,038	26.2	N/A
Majority		1,886	47.6	
Turnout		3,962		
Labour hold		Swing		

==== February 1904 (by-election) ====
By-election: 16 February 1904
Party	Candidate	Votes	%	±%
Labour	T. Fox	2,231	62.7	−11.1
Liberal	A. Malcolm	1,325	37.3	N/A
Majority		906	25.4	−22.2
Turnout		3,556		
Labour gain from Liberal		Swing		

==== November 1904 ====
1904
Party	Candidate	Votes	%	±%
Labour	T. Fox*	uncontested		
Labour hold		Swing		

==== November 1905 ====
1905
Party	Candidate	Votes	%	±%
Labour	J. Billam	2,868	57.2	N/A
Conservative	C. Dreyfus*	2,144	42.8	N/A
Majority		724	14.4	N/A
Turnout		5,012		
Labour gain from Conservative		Swing		

==== November 1906 ====
1906
Party	Candidate	Votes	%	±%
Labour	J. E. Sutton*	uncontested		
Labour hold		Swing		

==== November 1907 ====
1907
Party	Candidate	Votes	%	±%
Labour	T. Fox*	uncontested		
Labour hold		Swing		

==== November 1908 ====
1908
Party	Candidate	Votes	%	±%
Labour	J. Billam*	3,080	53.0	N/A
Independent	G. B. Hertz	2,733	47.0	N/A
Majority		347	6.0	N/A
Turnout		5,813		
Labour hold		Swing		

==== November 1909 ====
1909
Party	Candidate	Votes	%	±%
Labour	J. E. Sutton*	uncontested		
Labour hold		Swing		

=== Elections in 1910s ===
==== November 1910 ====
1910
Party	Candidate	Votes	%	±%
Labour	T. Fox*	2,684	56.0	N/A
Conservative	G. W. Pendlebury	2,106	44.0	N/A
Majority		578	12.0	N/A
Turnout		4,790		
Labour hold		Swing		

==== November 1910 (by-election) ====
By-election: 8 November 1910
Party	Candidate	Votes	%	±%
Liberal	T. L. Morris	2,408	51.4	N/A
Labour	W. Davies	2,273	48.6	−7.4
Majority		135	2.8	
Turnout		4,681		
Liberal gain from Labour		Swing		

==== November 1911 ====
1911
Party	Candidate	Votes	%	±%
Labour	J. Billam*	3,178	57.5	+1.5
Conservative	G. W. Pendlebury	2,346	42.5	−1.5
Majority		832	15.0	+3.0
Turnout		5,524		
Labour hold		Swing		

==== July 1912 (by-election) ====
By-election: 31 July 1912
Party	Candidate	Votes	%	±%
Conservative	G. W. Pendlebury	2,302	57.1	+14.6
Labour	W. Davies	1,732	42.9	−14.6
Majority		570	14.2	
Turnout		4,034		
Conservative gain from Liberal		Swing		

==== November 1912 ====
1912
Party	Candidate	Votes	%	±%
Conservative	G. W. Pendlebury*	2,837	68.9	+26.4
Liberal	W. Davies	1,278	31.1	N/A
Majority		1,609	39.2	
Turnout		4,115		
Conservative hold		Swing		

==== November 1913 ====
1913
Party	Candidate	Votes	%	±%
Labour	T. Fox*	uncontested		
Labour hold		Swing		

==== November 1914 ====
1914
Party	Candidate	Votes	%	±%
Labour	J. Billam*	uncontested		
Labour hold		Swing		

==== May 1919 (by-election) ====
By-election: 28 May 1919
Party	Candidate	Votes	%	±%
Labour	E. J. Hart	2,330	56.3	
Conservative	F. Cornwall	1,809	43.7	
Majority		521	12.6	
Turnout		4,139		
Labour hold		Swing		

==== November 1919 ====
1919 (new boundaries)
Party	Candidate	Votes	%	±%
Labour	J. W. Sutton	2,263	57.1	
Conservative	G. W. Pendlebury*	1,699	42.9	
Majority		569	14.4	
Turnout		3,962	42.0	
Labour gain from Conservative		Swing		

=== Elections in 1920s ===
==== November 1920 ====
1920
Party	Candidate	Votes	%	±%
Labour	E. J. Hart*	uncontested		
Labour hold		Swing		

==== November 1921 ====
1921
Party	Candidate	Votes	%	±%
Labour	J. Binns*	2,875	58.0	N/A
Conservative	A. Ward	2,084	42.0	N/A
Majority		791	16.0	N/A
Turnout		4,959	52.3	N/A
Labour hold		Swing		

==== November 1922 ====
1922
Party	Candidate	Votes	%	±%
Labour	J. W. Sutton*	3,336	56.9	−1.1
Conservative	G. W. Leggott	2,523	43.1	+1.1
Majority		813	13.8	−2.2
Turnout		5,859	59.3	+7.0
Labour hold		Swing		

==== November 1923 ====
1923
Party	Candidate	Votes	%	±%
Labour	E. J. Hart*	3,302	51.4	−5.5
Conservative	G. W. Leggott	3,125	48.6	+5.5
Majority		179	2.8	−11.0
Turnout		6,427		
Labour hold		Swing		

==== November 1924 ====
1924
Party	Candidate	Votes	%	±%
Labour	J. Binns*	uncontested		
Labour hold		Swing		

==== November 1925 ====
1925
Party	Candidate	Votes	%	±%
Labour	J. W. Sutton*	3,700	59.9	N/A
Conservative	J. G. Kilbourne	2,482	40.1	N/A
Majority		1,218	19.8	N/A
Turnout		6,182	58.2	N/A
Labour hold		Swing		

==== November 1926 ====
1926
Party	Candidate	Votes	%	±%
Labour	E. J. Hart*	3,277	64.2	+4.3
Conservative	J. G. Kilbourne	1,829	35.8	−4.3
Majority		1,448	28.4	+8.6
Turnout		5,106	47.4	−10.8
Labour hold		Swing		

==== November 1927 ====
1927
Party	Candidate	Votes	%	±%
Labour	J. Binns*	uncontested		
Labour hold		Swing		

==== November 1928 ====
1928
Party	Candidate	Votes	%	±%
Labour	J. W. Sutton*	3,901	54.9	N/A
Conservative	F. J. Riley	3,181	44.8	N/A
Residents	W. T. Kilgariff	23	0.3	N/A
Majority		720	10.1	N/A
Turnout		7,105	66.8	N/A
Labour hold		Swing		

==== November 1929 ====
1929
Party	Candidate	Votes	%	±%
Labour	E. J. Hart*	uncontested		
Labour hold		Swing		

=== Elections in 1930s ===
==== November 1930 ====
1930
Party	Candidate	Votes	%	±%
Labour	J. Binns*	2,707	52.6	N/A
Conservative	S. Bloor	2,436	47.4	N/A
Majority		271	5.2	N/A
Turnout		5,143		
Labour hold		Swing		

==== January 1931 (by-election) ====
By-election: 20 January 1931
Party	Candidate	Votes	%	±%
Conservative	S. Bloor	2,701	54.5	+7.1
Labour	B. Clare	2,251	45.5	−7.1
Majority		450	9.0	
Turnout		4,952		
Conservative gain from Labour		Swing		

==== November 1931 ====
1931
Party	Candidate	Votes	%	±%
Conservative	F. J. Riley	3,596	59.0	+11.6
Labour	R. McKeon	2,503	41.0	−11.6
Majority		1,093	18.0	
Turnout		6,099	53.3	
Conservative gain from Labour		Swing		

==== November 1932 ====
1932
Party	Candidate	Votes	%	±%
Labour	E. J. Hart*	3,231	60.3	+19.3
Conservative	H. Poulter	1,987	37.1	−21.9
Communist	W. Dutson	137	2.6	N/A
Majority		1,244	23.2	
Turnout		5,355		
Labour hold		Swing		

==== November 1933 ====
1933
Party	Candidate	Votes	%	±%
Labour	R. Malcolm	3,460	60.6	+0.2
Conservative	S. Bloor*	2,251	39.4	+2.3
Majority		1,209	21.2	−2.0
Turnout		5,711		
Labour gain from Conservative		Swing		

==== November 1934 ====
1934
Party	Candidate	Votes	%	±%
Labour	H. Frankland	3,422	64.5	+3.9
Conservative	F. J. Riley*	1,884	35.5	−3.9
Majority		1,538	29.0	−7.8
Turnout		5,306		
Labour gain from Conservative		Swing		

==== November 1935 ====
1935
Party	Candidate	Votes	%	±%
Labour	E. J. Hart*	3,371	62.7	−1.8
Conservative	S. Bloor	2,006	37.3	+1.8
Majority		1,365	25.4	−3.6
Turnout		5,377		
Labour hold		Swing		

==== January 1936 (by-election) ====
By-election: 23 January 1936
Party	Candidate	Votes	%	±%
Labour	E. E. Beavan	2,071	63.2	+0.5
Conservative	H. Poulter	1,204	36.8	−0.5
Majority		867	26.4	+1.0
Turnout		3,275		
Labour hold		Swing		

==== November 1936 ====
1936
Party	Candidate	Votes	%	±%
Labour	R. Malcolm*	3,134	67.3	+4.6
Conservative	C. E. Holdnall	1,522	32.7	−4.6
Majority		1,612	34.6	+9.2
Turnout		4,656		
Labour hold		Swing		

==== November 1937 ====
1937
Party	Candidate	Votes	%	±%
Labour	H. Frankland*	2,766	64.1	−3.2
Conservative	C. E. Holdnall	1,546	35.9	+3.2
Majority		1,220	28.2	−6.4
Turnout		4,312		
Labour hold		Swing		

==== November 1938 ====
1938
Party	Candidate	Votes	%	±%
Labour	E. E. Beavan*	uncontested		
Labour hold		Swing		

=== Elections in 1940s ===
==== November 1945 ====
1945
Party	Candidate	Votes	%	±%
Labour	R. Malcolm*	4,163	74.9	N/A
Conservative	E. Griffiths	1,395	25.1	N/A
Majority		2,768	49.8	N/A
Turnout		5,558	31.6	
Labour hold		Swing		

==== November 1946 ====
1946
Party	Candidate	Votes	%	±%
Labour	H. Frankland*	3,633	63.3	−11.6
Conservative	W. Rose	2,105	36.7	+11.6
Majority		1,528	26.6	−23.2
Turnout		5,738		
Labour hold		Swing		

==== November 1947 ====
1947
Party	Candidate	Votes	%	±%
Labour	E. E. Beavan*	5,276	56.2	−7.1
Conservative	W. Rose	4,119	43.8	+7.1
Majority		1,157	12.4	−14.2
Turnout		9,395		
Labour hold		Swing		

==== May 1949 ====
1949
Party	Candidate	Votes	%	±%
Labour	R. Malcolm*	5,448	62.7	+6.5
Conservative	A. Gilbert	3,237	37.3	−6.5
Majority		2,211	25.4	+13.0
Turnout		8,685		
Labour hold		Swing		

=== Elections in 1950s ===
==== May 1950 ====
1950 (new boundaries)
Party	Candidate	Votes	%	±%
Labour	H. Frankland*	4,421	64.0	
Conservative	E. Rooney	2,488	36.0	
Majority		1,933	28.0	
Turnout		6,909		
Labour hold		Swing		

==== May 1951 ====
1951
Party	Candidate	Votes	%	±%
Labour	E. E. Beavan*	3,744	57.1	−6.9
Conservative	E. Rooney	2,808	42.9	+6.9
Majority		936	14.2	−13.8
Turnout		6,552		
Labour hold		Swing		

==== May 1952 ====
1952
Party	Candidate	Votes	%	±%
Labour	T. Lomas	5,366	72.3	+15.2
Conservative	E. Rooney	2,053	27.7	−15.2
Majority		3,313	44.6	+30.4
Turnout		7,419		
Labour hold		Swing		

==== May 1953 ====
1953
Party	Candidate	Votes	%	±%
Labour	G. McCall	4,291	71.6	−0.7
Conservative	J. Andrews	1,705	28.4	+0.7
Majority		2,586	43.2	−1.4
Turnout		5,996		
Labour hold		Swing		

==== May 1954 ====
1954
Party	Candidate	Votes	%	±%
Labour	E. E. Beavan*	3,917	71.9	+0.3
Conservative	F. H. Robinson	1,530	28.1	−0.3
Majority		2,387	43.8	+0.6
Turnout		5,447		
Labour hold		Swing		

==== July 1954 (by-election) ====
By-election: 15 July 1954
Party	Candidate	Votes	%	±%
Labour	J. Taylor	3,724	76.9	+5.0
Conservative	F. H. Robinson	1,118	23.1	−5.0
Majority		2,606	53.8	+10.0
Turnout		4,842		
Labour hold		Swing		

==== May 1955 ====
1955
Party	Candidate	Votes	%	±%
Labour	T. Lomas*	3,333	67.2	−4.7
Conservative	H. J. Caulfield	1,627	32.8	+4.7
Majority		1,706	34.4	−9.4
Turnout		4,960		
Labour hold		Swing		

==== May 1956 ====
1956
Party	Candidate	Votes	%	±%
Labour	G. McCall*	3,080	75.2	+8.0
Conservative	H. J. Caulfield	1,017	24.8	−8.0
Majority		2,063	50.4	+16.0
Turnout		4,097		
Labour hold		Swing		

==== May 1957 ====
1957
Party	Candidate	Votes	%	±%
Labour	J. Taylor*	3,776	81.8	+6.6
Conservative	A. P. Osborn	841	18.2	−6.6
Majority		2,935	63.6	+13.2
Turnout		4,617		
Labour hold		Swing		

==== May 1958 ====
1958
Party	Candidate	Votes	%	±%
Labour	T. Lomas*	3,081	79.1	−2.7
Conservative	D. Mawe	816	20.9	+2.7
Majority		2,265	58.2	−5.4
Turnout		3,897		
Labour hold		Swing		

==== May 1959 ====
1959
Party	Candidate	Votes	%	±%
Labour	G. McCall*	2,865	71.8	−7.3
Conservative	J. Mitton	1,124	28.2	+7.3
Majority		1,741	43.6	−14.6
Turnout		3,989		
Labour hold		Swing		

=== Elections in 1960s ===
==== May 1960 ====
1960
Party	Candidate	Votes	%	±%
Labour	J. Taylor*	2,306	67.5	−4.3
Conservative	P. Whitby	1,109	32.5	+4.3
Majority		1,197	35.0	−8.6
Turnout		3,415		
Labour hold		Swing		

==== May 1961 ====
1961
Party	Candidate	Votes	%	±%
Labour	T. Lomas*	2,754	74.2	+6.7
Conservative	L. N. Mallinson	959	25.8	−6.7
Majority		1,795	48.4	+13.4
Turnout		3,713		
Labour hold		Swing		

==== May 1962 ====
1962
Party	Candidate	Votes	%	±%
Labour	J. E. Jackson*	2,649	73.1	−1.1
Conservative	M. R. Chandler	974	26.9	+1.1
Majority		1,675	46.2	−2.2
Turnout		3,623		
Labour hold		Swing		

==== May 1963 ====
1963
Party	Candidate	Votes	%	±%
Labour	J. Taylor*	3,011	75.3	+2.2
Conservative	M. R. Chandler	859	21.5	−5.4
Communist	S. Cole	129	3.2	N/A
Majority		2,152	53.8	+7.6
Turnout		3,999		
Labour hold		Swing		

==== November 1963 (by-election) ====
By-election: 7 November 1963
Party	Candidate	Votes	%	±%
Labour	R. Massey	1,605	74.1	−1.2
Conservative	M. R. Chandler	478	22.1	+0.6
Communist	S. Cole	83	3.8	+0.6
Majority		1,127	52.0	−1.8
Turnout		2,166		
Labour hold		Swing		

==== May 1964 ====
1964
Party	Candidate	Votes	%	±%
Labour	R. Massey*	2,312	72.0	−3.3
Conservative	H. J. Caulfield	753	23.4	+1.9
Communist	S. Cole	147	4.6	+1.4
Majority		1,559	48.6	−5.2
Turnout		3,212		
Labour hold		Swing		

==== May 1965 ====
1965
Party	Candidate	Votes	%	±%
Labour	J. E. Jackson*	1,808	60.2	−11.8
Conservative	R. J. Chronnell	1,068	35.3	+11.9
Communist	S. Cole	137	4.6	0
Majority		748	24.9	−23.7
Turnout		3,005		
Labour hold		Swing		

==== May 1966 ====
1966
Party	Candidate	Votes	%	±%
Labour	J. Taylor*	1,974	68.7	+8.5
Conservative	L. D. Gann	823	28.6	−6.7
Communist	S. Cole	76	2.7	−1.9
Majority		1,151	40.1	+15.2
Turnout		2,873		
Labour hold		Swing		

==== May 1967 ====
1967
Party	Candidate	Votes	%	±%
Labour	R. Massey*	1,440	48.7	−20.0
Conservative	D. F. Silverman	1,418	47.9	+19.3
Communist	D. Maher	100	3.4	+0.7
Majority		22	0.8	−39.3
Turnout		2,958		
Labour hold		Swing		

==== May 1968 ====
1968
Party	Candidate	Votes	%	±%
Conservative	D. Silverman	1,963	53.0	+5.1
Labour	J. E. Jackson*	1,645	44.4	−4.3
Communist	D. Maher	97	2.6	−0.8
Majority		318	8.6	
Turnout		3,705		
Conservative gain from Labour		Swing		

==== May 1969 ====
1969
Party	Candidate	Votes	%	±%
Labour	J. Taylor*	2,404	59.7	+15.3
Conservative	A. W. Ash	1,623	40.3	−12.7
Majority		781	19.4	
Turnout		4,027		
Labour hold		Swing		

=== Elections in 1970s ===
==== May 1970 ====
1970
Party	Candidate	Votes	%	±%
Labour	R. Massey*	1,821	60.6	+0.9
Conservative	H. Horton	1,131	37.6	−2.7
Communist	P. Maher	43	1.4	N/A
Residents	J. Gidley	10	0.3	N/A
Majority		690	23.0	+3.6
Turnout		3,005		
Labour hold		Swing		

==== May 1971 ====
1971 (3 vacancies; new boundaries)
Party	Candidate	Votes	%	±%
Labour	J. Gilmore*	4,662	78.2	
Labour	J. Taylor*	4,433	74.4	
Labour	W. Egerton*	4,302	72.2	
Conservative	D. Lear	1,568	26.3	
Conservative	A. P. Osborn	1,345	22.6	
Conservative	M. Withers	1,303	21.9	
Communist	E. R. Prior	269	4.5	
Majority		2,734	45.9	
Turnout		5,961		
Labour win (new seat)				
Labour win (new seat)				
Labour win (new seat)				

==== July 1971 (by-election) ====
By-election: 8 July 1971
Party	Candidate	Votes	%	±%
Labour	R. Massey	2,133	65.6	−12.6
Conservative	D. F. Silverman	1,120	34.3	+8.1
Majority		1,013	31.1	−14.8
Turnout		3,253		
Labour hold		Swing		

==== May 1972 ====
1972
Party	Candidate	Votes	%	±%
Labour	W. Egerton*	2,784	64.1	−14.1
Conservative	D. Lear	1,559	35.9	+9.6
Majority		1,225	28.2	−17.7
Turnout		4,343		
Labour hold		Swing		

==== May 1973 ====
1973 (3 vacancies; reorganisation)
Party	Candidate	Votes	%	±%
Labour	J. Gilmore*	2,271	62.3	−1.8
Labour	W. Egerton*	2,230	61.1	−3.0
Labour	E. Grant	2,100	57.6	−6.5
Conservative	C. R. Ashton	1,239	34.0	−1.9
Conservative	H. Pickles	1,169	32.0	−3.9
Conservative	G. M. Farmer	1,161	31.8	−4.1
Majority		861	23.6	−4.6
Turnout		3,648		
Labour hold		Swing		
Labour hold		Swing		
Labour hold		Swing		

==== May 1975 ====
1975
Party	Candidate	Votes	%	±%
Labour	E. Grant*	1,525	48.7	−16.0
Conservative	C. R. Ashton	1,454	46.4	+11.1
Communist	M. Pearce	83	2.6	+2.6
Independent	J. Hulse	72	2.3	+2.3
Majority		71	2.3	−27.1
Turnout		3,134		
Labour hold		Swing	-13.5	

==== May 1976 ====
1976
Party	Candidate	Votes	%	±%
Labour	Bill Egerton*	2,376	53.6	+4.9
Conservative	C. R. Ashton	1,906	43.0	−3.4
Liberal	M. W. Powell	99	2.2	+2.2
Independent	J. Hulse	53	1.2	−1.1
Majority		470	10.6	+8.3
Turnout		4,434		
Labour hold		Swing	+4.1	

==== May 1978 ====
1978
Party	Candidate	Votes	%	±%
Labour	J. Gilmore*	2,398	58.8	+5.2
Conservative	L. Hockey	1,490	36.6	−6.4
National Front	J. Hulse	139	3.4	+3.4
Communist	M. Murray	49	1.2	+1.2
Majority		908	22.3	+11.7
Turnout		4,076	33.3	
Labour hold		Swing	+5.8	

==== May 1979 ====
1979
Party	Candidate	Votes	%	±%
Labour	E. Grant*	5,127	63.9	+5.1
Conservative	L. Hockey	2,459	30.6	−6.0
Liberal	P. Hanmer	440	5.5	+5.5
Majority		2,668	33.2	+10.9
Turnout		8,026	69.7	+36.4
Labour hold		Swing	+5.5	

=== Elections in 1980s ===
==== May 1980 ====
1980
Party	Candidate	Votes	%	±%
Labour	Bill Egerton*	2,691	70.0	+6.1
Conservative	L. Hockey	981	25.5	−5.1
Liberal	L. Towers	172	4.5	−1.0
Majority		1,710	44.5	+11.3
Turnout		3,844	32.6	−37.1
Labour hold		Swing	+5.6	

==== May 1982 ====
1982 (3 vacancies; new boundaries)
Party	Candidate	Votes	%	±%
Labour	John Gilmore*	2,190	67.1	
Labour	Edward Grant*	2,064	63.3	
Labour	Michael Harrison	1,928	59.1	
Conservative	David Eager	579	17.7	
Conservative	Geoffrey Glover	518	15.9	
Conservative	Stephen Ellwood	502	15.4	
Liberal	Charles Harris	417	12.8	
Liberal	Colin Dowse	354	10.8	
SDP	Peter Crichton-Gold	344	10.5	
Majority		1,349	41.3	
Turnout		3,263	33.6	
Labour win (new seat)				
Labour win (new seat)				
Labour win (new seat)				

==== May 1983 ====
1983
Party	Candidate	Votes	%	±%
Labour	Michael Harrison*	2,499	72.8	+4.0
Conservative	Clive Webb	615	17.9	−0.3
Liberal	Norman Towers	321	9.3	−3.7
Majority		1,884	54.8	+4.2
Turnout		3,435		
Labour hold		Swing	+2.1	

==== May 1984 ====
1984
Party	Candidate	Votes	%	±%
Labour	C. Heald	2,455	79.3	+6.5
Conservative	M. Payne	402	13.0	−4.9
Liberal	S. Donnelly	237	7.7	−1.6
Majority		2,053	66.4	+11.6
Turnout		3,094		
Labour hold		Swing	+5.7	

==== May 1986 ====
1986
Party	Candidate	Votes	%	±%
Labour	J. Gilmore*	2,175	78.8	−0.5
Conservative	M. Payne	334	12.1	−0.9
Liberal	S. Lewis	250	9.1	+1.4
Majority		1,841	66.7	+0.3
Turnout		2,759		
Labour hold		Swing	+0.2	

==== May 1987 ====
1987
Party	Candidate	Votes	%	±%
Labour	Margaret Smith	2,048	61.9	−16.9
Liberal	Simon Lewis	650	19.6	+10.5
Conservative	Margaret Payne	610	18.4	+6.3
Majority		1,398	42.3	−24.4
Turnout		3,308		
Labour hold		Swing	-13.7	

==== May 1988 ====
1988
Party	Candidate	Votes	%	±%
Labour	K. J. Rowswell	2,008	72.8	+10.9
Conservative	K. Hyde	531	19.2	+0.8
SLD	P. F. Allanson	220	8.0	−11.6
Majority		1,477	53.5	+11.2
Turnout		2,759		
Labour hold		Swing	+5.0	

=== Elections in 1990s ===
==== May 1990 ====
1990
Party	Candidate	Votes	%	±%
Labour	J. Gilmore*	2,299	78.1	+5.3
Conservative	K. Hyde	347	11.8	−7.4
Liberal Democrats	I. C. Donaldson	196	6.7	−1.3
Green	A. H. Kahan	100	3.4	+3.4
Majority		1,952	66.3	+12.8
Turnout		2,942		
Labour hold		Swing	+6.3	

==== May 1991 ====
1991
Party	Candidate	Votes	%	±%
Labour	M. S. Smith*	1,657	70.4	−7.7
Conservative	K. Hyde	366	15.5	+3.7
Liberal Democrats	J. R. Bridges	270	11.5	+4.8
Green	A. H. Kahan	61	2.6	−0.8
Majority		1,291	54.8	−11.5
Turnout		2,354	27.8	
Labour hold		Swing	-5.7	

==== May 1992 ====
1992
Party	Candidate	Votes	%	±%
Labour	P. Kelly	992	62.9	−7.5
Conservative	C. Birchenough	373	23.7	+8.2
Liberal Democrats	M. Dunican	163	10.3	−1.2
Green	M. Daw	48	3.0	+0.4
Majority		619	39.3	−15.5
Turnout		1,576		
Labour hold		Swing	-7.8	

==== May 1994 ====
1994
Party	Candidate	Votes	%	±%
Labour	J. Gilmore*	1,576	71.8	+8.9
Liberal Democrats	P. Fairhurst	432	19.7	+9.4
Conservative	K. Hyde	173	7.9	−15.8
Independent	C. Morris	15	0.7	+0.7
Majority		1,144	52.1	+12.8
Turnout		2,196		
Labour hold		Swing	-0.2	

==== May 1995 ====
1995
Party	Candidate	Votes	%	±%
Labour	Margaret Smith*	1,408	70.3	−1.5
Liberal Democrats	Peter Fairhurst	417	20.8	+1.1
Conservative	K. Hyde	119	5.9	−2.0
Green	Elaine Brown	58	2.9	+2.9
Majority		991	49.5	−2.6
Turnout		2,002		
Labour hold		Swing	-1.3	

==== May 1996 ====
1996
Party	Candidate	Votes	%	±%
Labour	Paul Kelly*	1,152	76.2	+5.9
Liberal Democrats	S. Kennedy	212	14.0	−6.8
Conservative	Elena Stars	98	6.5	+0.6
Green	Elaine Brown	50	3.3	+0.4
Majority		940	62.2	+12.7
Turnout		1,512		
Labour hold		Swing	+6.3	

==== May 1998 ====
1998
Party	Candidate	Votes	%	±%
Labour	Neil Swannick	759	58.4	−17.8
Liberal Democrats	Peter Fairhurst	449	34.5	+20.5
Conservative	Joyce Haydock	92	7.1	+0.6
Majority		310	23.8	−38.4
Turnout		1,300		
Labour hold		Swing	-19.1	

==== May 1999 ====
1999
Party	Candidate	Votes	%	±%
Liberal Democrats	Peter Fairhurst	978	54.6	+20.1
Labour	Margaret Smith*	761	42.5	−15.9
Conservative	Joyce Haycock	53	3.0	−4.1
Majority		217	12.1	−11.7
Turnout		1,792	24.6	
Liberal Democrats gain from Labour		Swing	+18.0	

=== Elections in 2000s ===
==== May 2000 ====
2000
Party	Candidate	Votes	%	±%
Labour	John Smith	842	50.6	+8.1
Liberal Democrats	Elaine Boyes	697	41.9	−12.7
Conservative	Brian Birchenough	97	5.8	+2.8
Green	Robert Allen	28	1.7	+1.7
Majority		145	8.7	−3.4
Turnout		1,664	24.0	−0.6
Labour hold		Swing	+10.4	

==== May 2002 ====
2002
Party	Candidate	Votes	%	±%
Labour	Neil Swannick*	1,332	60.8	+10.2
Liberal Democrats	Neil Trafford	753	34.4	−7.5
Conservative	Brian Birchenough	70	3.2	−2.6
Green	Antony Quinn	35	1.6	−0.1
Majority		579	26.4	+17.7
Turnout		2,190	31.6	+7.6
Labour hold		Swing	+8.8	

==== May 2003 ====
2003
Party	Candidate	Votes	%	±%
Labour	John Longsden	989	61.7	+0.9
Liberal Democrats	Peter Fairhurst*	518	32.3	−2.1
Conservative	Brian Birchenough	66	4.1	+0.9
Green	Elvis Presley	30	1.9	+0.3
Majority		471	29.4	+3.0
Turnout		1,603	23.9	−7.7
Labour gain from Liberal Democrats		Swing	+1.5	

==== June 2004 ====
2004 (3 vacancies; new boundaries)
Party	Candidate	Votes	%	±%
Labour	Neil Swannick*	1,537	60.2	
Labour	John Smith*	1,478	57.9	
Labour	John Longsden*	1,466	57.4	
Liberal Democrats	Lorraine Bowman	520	20.4	
Liberal Democrats	Peter Fairhurst	482	18.9	
Liberal Democrats	William Fisher	346	13.5	
Green	Christopher Waldon	215	8.4	
Conservative	Brian Birchenough	205	8.0	
Conservative	Christine Birchenough	205	8.0	
Conservative	Karen Abbad	188	7.4	
Majority		946	37.0	
Turnout		2,554	29.8	
Labour win (new seat)				
Labour win (new seat)				
Labour win (new seat)				

==== May 2006 ====
2006
Party	Candidate	Votes	%	±%
Labour	John Longsden*	1,525	69.8	+7.7
Liberal Democrats	Rob Brettle	316	14.5	+0.3
Conservative	Karen Abbad	188	8.6	−6.5
Green	Christopher Waldon	156	7.1	−1.6
Majority		1,209	55.3	+14.2
Turnout		2,185	25.3	−4.5
Labour hold		Swing	+3.7	

==== May 2007 ====
2007
Party	Candidate	Votes	%	±%
Labour	Rosa Battle	1,476	70.8	+1.0
Liberal Democrats	James Guise	288	13.8	−0.7
Conservative	Rodney Keller	190	9.1	+0.5
Green	Christopher Waldon	131	6.3	−0.8
Majority		1,188	57.0	+1.7
Turnout		2,085	22.3	−3.0
Labour hold		Swing	+0.8	

==== May 2008 ====
2008
Party	Candidate	Votes	%	±%
Labour	Neil Swannick*	1,467	67.1	−3.7
Liberal Democrats	Chris Jenkinson	286	13.1	−0.7
Conservative	Rod Keller	224	10.2	+1.1
Green	Andrew Bullen	209	9.6	+3.3
Majority		1,181	54.0	−3.0
Turnout		2,186	22.0	−0.3
Labour hold		Swing	-1.5	

=== Elections in 2010s ===
==== May 2010 ====
2010
Party	Candidate	Votes	%	±%
Labour	John Longsden*	2,890	63.9	−3.2
Liberal Democrats	Sarah McCulloch	906	20.0	+6.9
Conservative	Adam Shaw	513	11.3	+1.1
Green	Andrew James Bullen	214	4.7	−4.9
Majority		1,984	43.9	−10.1
Turnout		4,523	42.1	+20.1
Labour hold		Swing	-5.0	

==== May 2011 ====
2011
Party	Candidate	Votes	%	±%
Labour	Rosa Battle*	2,169	78.4	+7.6
Conservative	Sarah Bennett	248	9.0	−0.1
Green	Lorna Bowen	175	6.3	+0.0
Liberal Democrats	Emma Bean	173	6.3	−12.5
Majority		1,921	69.5	
Turnout		2,765	25.1	
Labour hold		Swing	+10.0	

==== May 2012 ====
2012
Party	Candidate	Votes	%	±%
Labour	Neil Swannick*	1,903	77.7	+10.6
Conservative	Sarah Bennett	159	6.5	−3.7
Green	Lorna Bowen	141	5.8	−3.8
Pirate	Loz Kaye	127	5.2	N/A
Liberal Democrats	Charles Turner	106	4.3	−8.8
Communist League	Peter Clifford	14	0.6	N/A
Majority		1,744	71.2	
Turnout		2,450	21.21	
Labour hold		Swing		

==== May 2014 ====
2014
Party	Candidate	Votes	%	±%
Labour	John Longsden*	2,215	70.74	+6.84
Green	George Czernuszka	367	11.72	+7.02
Conservative	Saira Khanum	296	9.45	−1.85
Liberal Democrats	Simon Mitchell	195	6.23	−13.77
Christian Democrat Party for a Consensus	Jonathan Cox	58	1.85	N/A
Majority		1,848	59	
Turnout		3,131	25.7	
Labour hold		Swing		

==== May 2015 ====
2015
Party	Candidate	Votes	%	±%
Labour	Rosa May Battle*	4,163	69.1	−9.3
Conservative	Barney Bradley Clarke Watson	804	13.3	+4.3
Green	Rachel Harper	625	10.4	+4.1
Liberal Democrats	Eve Friday	230	3.8	−2.5
TUSC	Alex Powell	97	1.6	N/A
Christian Democrat Party for a Consensus	Jonathan Cox	84	1.4	N/A
Communist League	Catharina Eva Gunela Tirsen	21	0.4	N/A
Majority		659	55.8	
Turnout		6,024	48.5	+23.4
Labour hold		Swing		

==== May 2016 ====
2016
Party	Candidate	Votes	%	±%
Labour	Emma Victoria Taylor	2,121	73.4	−4.3
Green	Rachel Harper	283	9.8	+4.0
Conservative	Michael Charles Barnes	249	8.6	+2.1
Liberal Democrats	Gary McKenna	105	3.6	−0.7
TUSC	Alexander Robert John Powell	75	2.6	N/A
Christian Democrat Party for a Consensus	Jonathan Cox	57	1.97	N/A
Majority		1,838	63.6	
Turnout		2,890	24.00	
Labour hold		Swing		

== See also ==
- Manchester City Council
- Manchester City Council elections
