= 1896 Manchester City Council election =

Local election in Manchester

- 2 November 1896

26 of 104 seats to Manchester City Council 53 seats needed for a majority
	First party	Second party	Third party
Party	Conservative	Liberal	Liberal Unionist
Last election	11 seats, 45.5%	15 seats, 40.8%	0 seats, 0.0%
Seats before	45	50	7
Seats won	16	9	1
Seats after	48	47	7
Seat change	▲3	▼3	Steady
Popular vote	13,385	13,012	1,306
Percentage	38.2%	37.1%	3.7%
Swing	▼7.3%	▼3.7%	▲3.7%
	Fourth party
Party	Ind. Labour Party
Last election	0 seats, 10.3%
Seats before	2
Seats won	0
Seats after	2
Seat change	Steady
Popular vote	5,936
Percentage	19.4%
Swing	▲9.1%
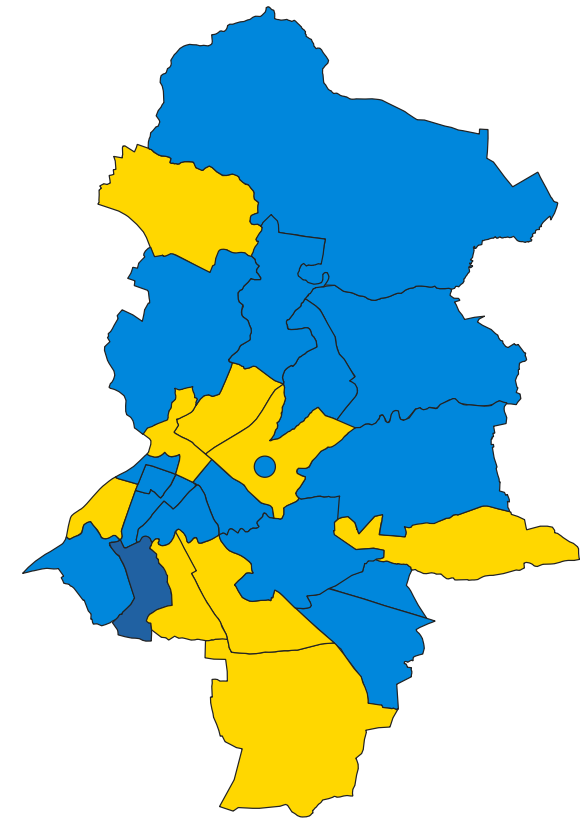
- Map of results of 1896 election
Leader of the Council before election
No overall control
Leader of the Council after election
No overall control

Elections to Manchester City Council were held on Monday, 2 November 1896. One third of the councillors seats were up for election, with each successful candidate to serve a three-year term of office. The council remained under no overall control.

== Election result ==
Party	Votes		Seats			Full Council	
Conservative Party	13,385 (38.2%)	▼7.3	16 (61.5%)	16 / 26	▲3	48 (46.2%)	48 / 104
Liberal Party	13,012 (37.1%)	▼3.7	9 (34.6%)	9 / 26	▼3	47 (45.2%)	47 / 104
Liberal Unionist	1,306 (3.7%)	▲3.7	1 (3.8%)	1 / 26	Steady	7 (6.7%)	7 / 104
Ind. Labour Party	5,936 (19.4%)	▲9.1	0 (0.0%)	0 / 26	Steady	2 (1.9%)	2 / 104
Social Democratic Federation	1,191 (3.4%)	▲2.0	0 (0.0%)	0 / 26	Steady	0 (0.0%)	0 / 104
Independent	203 (0.6%)	N/A	0 (0.0%)	0 / 26	N/A	0 (0.0%)	0 / 104

=== Full council ===
↓
2	47	7	48

=== Aldermen ===
↓
15	5	6

=== Councillors ===
↓
2	32	2	42

== Ward results ==
=== All Saints' ===
All Saints'
Party	Candidate	Votes	%	±%
Liberal	W. B. Pritchard*	uncontested		
Liberal hold		Swing		

=== Ardwick ===
Ardwick
Party	Candidate	Votes	%	±%
Conservative	W. Pollitt*	1,883	51.5	N/A
Liberal	J. Shaw	1,774	48.5	N/A
Majority		109	3.0	N/A
Turnout		3,657		
Conservative hold		Swing		

=== Blackley and Moston ===
Blackley and Moston
Party	Candidate	Votes	%	±%
Conservative	S. Mills*	1,110	52.9	+9.5
Liberal	G. Bennett	990	47.1	−9.5
Majority		120	5.8	
Turnout		2,100		
Conservative hold		Swing		

=== Bradford ===
Bradford
Party	Candidate	Votes	%	±%
Conservative	J. Tunstall*	uncontested		
Conservative hold		Swing		

=== Cheetham ===
Cheetham
Party	Candidate	Votes	%	±%
Conservative	C. H. Braddon*	uncontested		
Conservative hold		Swing		

=== Collegiate Church ===
Collegiate Church
Party	Candidate	Votes	%	±%
Liberal	W. E. Cary*	uncontested		
Liberal hold		Swing		

=== Crumpsall ===
Crumpsall
Party	Candidate	Votes	%	±%
Liberal	W. Bradley*	uncontested		
Liberal hold		Swing		

=== Exchange ===
Exchange
Party	Candidate	Votes	%	±%
Conservative	T. Smethurst	379	51.0	+2.6
Liberal	R. Ramsbottom	364	49.0	−2.6
Majority		15	2.0	
Turnout		743		
Conservative gain from Liberal		Swing		

=== Harpurhey ===
Harpurhey
Party	Candidate	Votes	%	±%
Conservative	G. W. Chadwick	1,911	38.7	−23.6
Ind. Labour Party	J. Harker	1,533	31.0	−6.6
Liberal	W. Sherratt*	1,494	30.3	N/A
Majority		378	7.7	−16.9
Turnout		4,938		
Conservative gain from Liberal		Swing		

=== Longsight ===
Longsight
Party	Candidate	Votes	%	±%
Conservative	C. Jennison*	uncontested		
Conservative hold		Swing		

=== Medlock Street ===
Medlock Street
Party	Candidate	Votes	%	±%
Liberal Unionist	N. Bradley*	1,306	56.9	N/A
Ind. Labour Party	J. Johnston	991	43.1	+20.1
Majority		315	13.8	
Turnout		2,297		
Liberal Unionist hold		Swing		

=== Miles Platting ===
Miles Platting
Party	Candidate	Votes	%	±%
Conservative	T. Milnes	1,065	51.3	+9.6
Lib-Lab	G. D. Kelley	1,013	48.7	+1.7
Majority		52	2.6	
Turnout		2,078		
Conservative hold		Swing		

=== New Cross ===
New Cross
Party	Candidate	Votes	%	±%
Liberal	R. Bishop	2,524	70.3	+10.1
Conservative	W. Holland*	2,329	64.9	+20.7
Ind. Labour Party	G. G Beresford	1,162	32.4	N/A
Majority		1,167	32.5	
Turnout		3,589		
Liberal hold		Swing		
Conservative hold		Swing		

=== Newton Heath ===
Newton Heath
Party	Candidate	Votes	%	±%
Conservative	W. T. Rothwell*	1,343	72.5	N/A
Ind. Labour Party	A. Mear	509	27.5	N/A
Majority		834	45.0	N/A
Turnout		1,852		
Conservative hold		Swing		

=== Openshaw ===
Openshaw
Party	Candidate	Votes	%	±%
Liberal	J. Saxon*	1,813	65.8	+39.7
Ind. Labour Party	E. J. Hart	944	34.2	+10.8
Majority		869	31.6	
Turnout		2,757		
Liberal hold		Swing		

=== Oxford ===
Oxford
Party	Candidate	Votes	%	±%
Conservative	J. J. Lambert*	uncontested		
Conservative hold		Swing		

=== Rusholme ===
Rusholme
Party	Candidate	Votes	%	±%
Liberal	E. Holt*	uncontested		
Liberal hold		Swing		

=== St. Ann's ===
St. Ann's
Party	Candidate	Votes	%	±%
Conservative	A. G. Copeland*	uncontested		
Conservative hold		Swing		

=== St. Clement's ===
St. Clement's
Party	Candidate	Votes	%	±%
Conservative	W. Spurr	798	55.6	+5.0
Liberal	T. C. Abbott*	637	44.4	−5.0
Majority		161	11.2	+10.0
Turnout		1,435		
Conservative gain from Liberal		Swing		

=== St. George's ===
St. George's
Party	Candidate	Votes	%	±%
Conservative	R. A. S. Daly*	1,208	46.4	−28.9
Social Democratic Federation	W. Maben	1,191	45.8	+21.1
Independent	D. Mounsey	203	7.8	N/A
Majority		17	0.6	−50.0
Turnout		2,602		
Conservative hold		Swing		

=== St. James' ===
St. James'
Party	Candidate	Votes	%	±%
Conservative	H. Samson*	uncontested		
Conservative hold		Swing		

=== St. John's ===
St. John's
Party	Candidate	Votes	%	±%
Liberal	M. W. Southern*	575	55.8	+25.4
Conservative	W. H. Huddleston	455	44.2	−3.5
Majority		120	11.6	
Turnout		1,030		
Liberal hold		Swing		

=== St. Luke's ===
St. Luke's
Party	Candidate	Votes	%	±%
Liberal	J. W. Southern*	1,828	58.0	N/A
Conservative	J. Grime	1,323	42.0	N/A
Majority		505	16.0	
Turnout		3,151		
Liberal hold		Swing		

=== St. Mark's ===
St. Mark's
Party	Candidate	Votes	%	±%
Conservative	J. Phythian*	904	53.1	N/A
Ind. Labour Party	W. H. Griffiths	797	46.9	N/A
Majority		107	6.2	N/A
Turnout		1,701		
Conservative hold		Swing		

=== St. Michael's ===
St. Michael's
Party	Candidate	Votes	%	±%
Liberal	J. H. Wells*	uncontested		
Liberal hold		Swing		

== Aldermanic elections ==
=== Aldermanic election, 6 January 1897 ===
Caused by the death on 24 December 1896 of Alderman George Clay (Liberal Unionist, elected as an alderman by the council on 15 February 1893).

In his place, Councillor James Wilson Southern (Liberal, St. Luke's, elected 1 November 1884; previously 1877–83) was elected as an alderman by the council on 6 January 1897.

Party	Alderman	Ward	Term expires
Liberal	James Wilson Southern		1901

=== Aldermanic election, 20 January 1897 ===
Caused by the resignation on 6 January 1897 of Alderman Sir Anthony Marshall (Conservative, elected as an alderman by the council on 9 November 1892).

In his place, Councillor James Tunstall (Conservative, Bradford, elected 2 November 1885) was elected as an alderman by the council on 20 January 1897.

Party	Alderman	Ward	Term expires
Conservative	James Tunstall		1898

=== Aldermanic election, 20 October 1897 ===
Caused by the resignation on 6 October 1897 of Alderman John Mark (Liberal Unionist, elected as an alderman by the council on 30 October 1889).

In his place, Councillor John Richards (Conservative, Harpurhey, elected 2 November 1885) was elected as an alderman by the council on 20 October 1897.

Party	Alderman	Ward	Term expires
Conservative	John Richards		1901

== By-elections between 1896 and 1897 ==
=== St. Luke's, 11 January 1897 ===
Caused by the election as an alderman of Councillor James Wilson Southern (Liberal, St. Luke's, elected 1 November 1884; previously 1877–83) on 6 January 1897 following the death on 24 December 1896 of Alderman George Clay (Liberal Unionist, elected as an alderman by the council on 15 February 1893).

St. Luke's
Party	Candidate	Votes	%	±%
Liberal	H. Marsden	uncontested		
Liberal hold		Swing		

=== Bradford, 2 February 1897 ===
Caused by the election as an alderman of Councillor James Tunstall (Conservative, Bradford, elected 2 November 1885) on 20 January 1897 following the resignation on 6 January 1897 of Alderman Sir Anthony Marshall (Conservative, elected as an alderman by the council on 9 November 1892).

Bradford
Party	Candidate	Votes	%	±%
Conservative	C. Dreyfus	1,992	65.1	N/A
Liberal	J. J. Kearns	1,066	34.9	N/A
Majority		926	30.2	N/A
Turnout		3,058		
Conservative hold		Swing		

=== Ardwick, 16 March 1897 ===
Caused by the resignation of Councillor Dr. Robert Charnley Smith (Conservative, Ardwick, elected 22 September 1891) on 3 March 1897.

Ardwick
Party	Candidate	Votes	%	±%
Conservative	S. Chesters Thompson	2,630	79.0	+27.5
Liberal	R. A. Brown	698	21.0	−27.5
Majority		1,932	58.0	+55.0
Turnout		3,328		
Conservative hold		Swing		

=== Bradford, 19 August 1897 ===
Caused by the resignation of Councillor John Hutt (Liberal, Bradford, elected 2 November 1885) on 3 August 1897.

Bradford
Party	Candidate	Votes	%	±%
Liberal	H. Grimshaw	1,487	50.9	+16.0
Conservative	S. L. Keymer	1,434	49.1	−16.0
Majority		53	1.8	
Turnout		2,921		
Liberal hold		Swing		
