= Beswick and Clayton =

- Ward
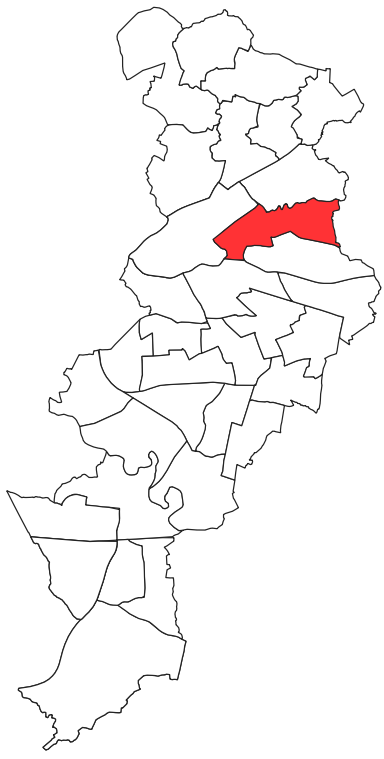
- Beswick and Clayton ward (1994) within Manchester

- Coat of arms
- Country: United Kingdom
- Constituent country: England
- Region: North West England
- County: Greater Manchester
- Metropolitan borough: Manchester
- Created: May 1982
- Named for: Beswick, Clayton

Government
  - Type: Unicameral
  - Body: Manchester City Council
- UK Parliamentary Constituency: Manchester Exchange

Beswick and Clayton was an electoral division of Manchester City Council which was represented from 1982 until 2004. It covered Beswick, Clayton, and parts of Ancoats.

== Overview ==
Beswick and Clayton ward was created in 1982, from the area of the former Beswick ward and the northern part of the Bradford ward. The ward was abolished in 2004 and its remaining area was divided between Bradford ward and the new Ancoats and Clayton ward.

Initially, the ward formed part of the Manchester Exchange Parliamentary constituency. From 1983 until its abolition, it was part of the Manchester Central Parliamentary constituency.

== Councillors ==
Election	Councillor	Councillor	Councillor
1982	W. Egerton (Lab)	J. Flanagan (Lab)	S. Silverman (Lab)
1983	W. Egerton (Lab)	J. Flanagan (Lab)	S. Silverman (Lab)
1984	W. Egerton (Lab)	J. Flanagan (Lab)	S. Silverman (Lab)
1986	W. Egerton (Lab)	J. Flanagan (Lab)	S. Silverman (Lab)
1987	W. Egerton (Lab)	J. Flanagan (Lab)	S. Silverman (Lab)
1988	W. Egerton (Lab)	J. Flanagan (Lab)	S. Silverman (Lab)
1990	W. Egerton (Lab)	J. Flanagan (Lab)	S. Silverman (Lab)
1991	W. Egerton (Lab)	J. Flanagan (Lab)	S. Silverman (Lab)
1992	W. Egerton (Lab)	J. Flanagan (Lab)	S. Silverman (Lab)
February 1993	W. Egerton (Lab)	J. Flanagan (Lab)	K. Dobson (Lib Dem)
1994	M. Dunican (Lib Dem)	J. Flanagan (Lab)	K. Dobson (Lib Dem)
1995	M. Dunican (Lib Dem)	J. Flanagan (Lab)	K. Dobson (Lib Dem)
1996	M. Dunican (Lib Dem)	M. Clayton (Lib Dem)	K. Dobson (Lib Dem)
1998	A. Harland (Lab)	M. Clayton (Lib Dem)	K. Dobson (Lib Dem)
1999	A. Harland (Lab)	M. Clayton (Lib Dem)	M. Carmody (Lab)
2000	A. Harland (Lab)	M. Clayton (Lib Dem)	M. Carmody (Lab)
June 2001	M. Loughman (Lab)	M. Clayton (Lib Dem)	M. Carmody (Lab)
2002	M. Loughman (Lab)	M. Clayton (Lib Dem)	M. Carmody (Lab)
2003	M. Loughman (Lab)	M. Clayton (Lib Dem)	M. Carmody (Lab)

== Elections ==
=== Elections in 1980s ===
==== May 1982 ====
1982 (3 vacancies)
Party	Candidate	Votes	%	±%
Labour	Bill Egerton	2,167	65.4	
Labour	Jack Flanagan*	2,116	63.9	
Labour	Sidney Silverman*	1,979	59.7	
Conservative	Leonard Hockey	710	21.4	
Conservative	Keith West	536	16.2	
Conservative	Joan Swatton	533	16.1	
SDP	Susan Birtwistle	318	9.6	
SDP	Charles Hill	276	8.3	
SDP	Ruth Levy	251	7.6	
Majority		1,269	38.3	
Turnout		3,314	36.5	
Labour win (new seat)				
Labour win (new seat)				
Labour win (new seat)				

==== May 1983 ====
1983
Party	Candidate	Votes	%	±%
Labour	Sidney Silverman*	2,498	68.9	+1.1
Conservative	Leonard Hockey	797	22.0	−0.2
SDP	Angus Bateman	244	6.7	−3.2
National Front	Alfred Coles	84	2.3	+2.3
Majority		1,701	47.0	+1.3
Turnout		3,623		
Labour hold		Swing	+0.6	

==== May 1984 ====
1984
Party	Candidate	Votes	%	±%
Labour	Jack Flanagan*	2,432	76.2	+7.3
Conservative	David Eager	543	17.0	−5.0
SDP	Angus Bateman	148	4.6	−2.1
National Front	Alfred Coles	68	2.1	−0.2
Majority		1,889	59.2	+12.2
Turnout		3,191		
Labour hold		Swing	+6.1	

==== May 1986 ====
1986
Party	Candidate	Votes	%	±%
Labour	Bill Egerton*	2,046	74.0	−2.2
Conservative	D. Eager	392	14.2	−2.8
SDP	V. Cahill	146	5.3	+0.7
Independent	F. Wolstencroft	115	4.2	+4.2
National Front	J. Hulse	64	2.3	+0.2
Majority		1,654	59.9	+0.7
Turnout		2,763		
Labour hold		Swing	+0.3	

==== May 1987 ====
1987
Party	Candidate	Votes	%	±%
Labour	Sidney Silverman*	1,867	56.2	−17.8
Conservative	Leonard Hockey	885	26.6	+12.4
SDP	Valerie Cahill	572	17.2	+11.9
Majority		982	29.5	−30.4
Turnout		3,324		
Labour hold		Swing	-15.1	

==== May 1988 ====
1988
Party	Candidate	Votes	%	±%
Labour	J. Flanagan*	2,157	75.0	+18.8
Conservative	B. H. Brooks	548	19.1	−7.5
SLD	V. M. Cahill	171	5.9	−11.3
Majority		1,253	43.6	+14.1
Turnout		2,876		
Labour hold		Swing	+13.1	

=== Elections in 1990s ===
==== May 1990 ====
1990
Party	Candidate	Votes	%	±%
Labour	W. Egerton*	2,480	79.6	+4.6
Conservative	M. D. Payne	324	10.4	−8.7
Liberal Democrats	V. M. Muir	202	6.5	+0.6
Green	K. M. Castle	109	3.5	+3.5
Majority		2,156	69.2	+25.6
Turnout		3,115		
Labour hold		Swing	+6.6	

==== May 1991 ====
1991
Party	Candidate	Votes	%	±%
Labour	S. C. Silverman*	1,517	65.8	−13.8
Conservative	D. V. Russell	440	19.1	+8.7
Liberal Democrats	C. W. Turner	264	11.4	+4.9
Independent	F. Wolstencroft	86	3.7	+3.7
Majority		1,077	46.7	−22.5
Turnout		2,307	31.2	
Labour hold		Swing	-11.2	

==== May 1992 ====
1992
Party	Candidate	Votes	%	±%
Labour	J. Flanagan*	1,182	63.1	−2.7
Liberal Democrats	K. Dobson	376	20.1	+8.7
Conservative	D. Russell	315	16.8	−2.3
Majority		806	43.0	−3.7
Turnout		1,873		
Labour hold		Swing	-5.7	

==== February 1993 (by-election) ====
By-election: 4 February 1993
Party	Candidate	Votes	%	±%
Liberal Democrats	K. Dobson	1,824	65.1	+45.0
Labour	A. Harland	886	31.6	−31.5
Conservative	D. Russell	92	3.3	−13.5
Majority		938	33.5	−9.5
Turnout		2,802		
Liberal Democrats gain from Labour		Swing		

==== May 1994 ====
1994
Party	Candidate	Votes	%	±%
Liberal Democrats	M. Dunican	1,652	55.3	+35.2
Labour	W. Egerton*	1,240	41.5	−21.6
Conservative	D. Russell	95	3.2	−13.6
Majority		412	13.8	−29.2
Turnout		2,987		
Liberal Democrats gain from Labour		Swing	+28.4	

==== May 1995 ====
1995
Party	Candidate	Votes	%	±%
Liberal Democrats	Ken Dobson*	1,622	58.6	+3.3
Labour	D. Parkes	1,073	38.8	−2.7
Conservative	Richard West	60	2.2	−1.0
Independent	H. Woodcock	13	0.5	+0.5
Majority		549	19.8	+6.0
Turnout		2,768		
Liberal Democrats hold		Swing	+3.0	

==== May 1996 ====
1996
Party	Candidate	Votes	%	±%
Liberal Democrats	Mark Clayton	1,133	47.9	−10.7
Labour	John Flanagan*	1,091	46.1	+7.3
Residents	K. Corcoran	73	3.1	+3.1
Conservative	Jeffrey Leach	70	3.0	+0.8
Majority		42	1.8	−18.0
Turnout		2,367		
Liberal Democrats gain from Labour		Swing	-9.0	

==== May 1998 ====
1998
Party	Candidate	Votes	%	±%
Labour	Andrew Harland	960	52.4	+6.3
Liberal Democrats	Martina Dunican*	805	44.0	−3.9
Conservative	Elena Stars	66	3.6	+0.6
Majority		155	8.5	+6.7
Turnout		1,831		
Labour gain from Liberal Democrats		Swing	+5.1	

==== May 1999 ====
1999
Party	Candidate	Votes	%	±%
Labour	Michael Carmody	1,024	56.4	+4.0
Liberal Democrats	Kenneth Dobson*	706	38.9	−5.1
Conservative	Albert Walsh	84	4.6	+1.0
Majority		318	17.5	+9.0
Turnout		1,814	24.8	
Labour gain from Liberal Democrats		Swing	+4.5	

=== Elections in 2000s ===
==== May 2000 ====
2000
Party	Candidate	Votes	%	±%
Liberal Democrats	Mark Clayton*	832	47.9	+9.0
Labour	Mick Loughman	807	46.4	−10.0
Conservative	Raymond Wattenbach	87	5.0	+0.4
Green	Michael Brennan	12	0.7	+0.7
Majority		25	1.5	−16.0
Turnout		1,738	25.2	+0.4
Liberal Democrats hold		Swing	+9.5	

==== June 2001 (by-election) ====
By-election: 10 June 2001
Party	Candidate	Votes	%	±%
Labour	Michael Loughman	1,850	61.9	+15.5
Liberal Democrats	Elaine Boyes	988	33.0	−14.9
Conservative	Richard West	153	5.1	+0.1
Majority		862	28.9	+27.4
Turnout		2,991		
Labour hold		Swing	+15.2	

==== May 2002 ====
2002
Party	Candidate	Votes	%	±%
Labour	Michael Loughman*	1,001	48.0	+2.2
Liberal Democrats	Elaine Boyes	879	42.1	−6.3
Independent Labour	Fred Bates	79	3.8	+3.8
Conservative	Christine Birchenough	69	3.3	−1.8
Independent	John Hulse	31	1.5	+1.5
Green	Susan Fairweather	27	1.3	+0.6
Majority		122	5.8	+3.2
Turnout		2,086	29.6	+4.4
Labour hold		Swing	+4.2	

==== May 2003 ====
2003
Party	Candidate	Votes	%	±%
Labour	Michael Carmody*	883	49.9	+1.9
Liberal Democrats	Elaine Boyes	748	42.3	+0.2
Conservative	Christine Birchenough	66	3.7	+0.4
Independent Labour	Fred Bates	41	2.3	−1.5
Green	Susan Fairweather	31	1.8	+0.5
Majority		135	7.6	+1.8
Turnout		1,769	26.4	−3.2
Labour hold		Swing	+0.8	

== See also ==
- Manchester City Council
- Manchester City Council elections
