= 2000 Manchester City Council election =

2000 UK local government election

- 4 May 2000

33 of 99 seats to Manchester City Council 50 seats needed for a majority
| | First party | Second party |
|---|---|---|
| Leader | Richard Leese | Simon Ashley |
| Party | Labour | Liberal Democrats |
| Leader's seat | Crumpsall | Gorton South |
| Last election | 27 seats, 53.4% | 7 seats, 30.3% |
| Seats before | 80 | 19 |
| Seats won | 24 | 9 |
| Seats after | 78 | 21 |
| Seat change | ▼2 | ▲2 |
| Popular vote | 31,378 | 20,605 |
| Percentage | 49.1% | 32.2% |
| Swing | ▼4.3% | ▲1.9% |
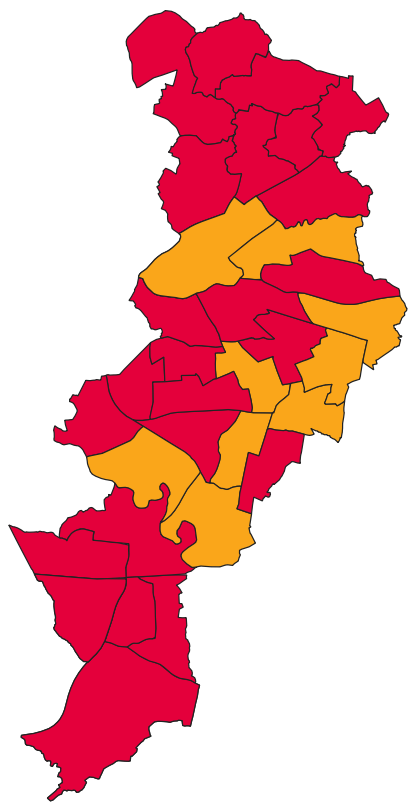
- Map of results of 2000 election
Leader of the Council before election
Richard Leese
Labour
Leader of the Council after election
Richard Leese
Labour

Elections to Manchester City Council were held on Thursday, 4 May 2000. One third of the council was up for election, with each successful candidate to serve a four-year term of office, expiring in 2004. The two Independent Labour candidates stood again as "Peace 2000 England's Republican". Overall turnout fell slightly to 20.5% and the Labour Party retained overall control of the council.

== Election result ==
| Party | Votes | | Seats | | | Full Council | |
| Labour Party | 31,378 (49.1%) | ▼4.3 | 24 (72.7%) | 24 / 33 | ▼2 | 78 (78.8%) | 78 / 99 |
| Liberal Democrats | 20,605 (32.2%) | ▲1.9 | 9 (27.3%) | 9 / 33 | ▲2 | 21 (21.2%) | 21 / 99 |
| Conservative Party | 7,684 (12.0%) | ▲0.3 | 0 (0.0%) | 0 / 33 | Steady | 0 (0.0%) | 0 / 99 |
| Green Party | 3,839 (6.0%) | ▲2.1 | 0 (0.0%) | 0 / 33 | Steady | 0 (0.0%) | 0 / 99 |
| Independent | 138 (0.2%) | Steady | 0 (0.0%) | 0 / 33 | Steady | 0 (0.0%) | 0 / 99 |
| Socialist Labour | 110 (0.2%) | Steady | 0 (0.0%) | 0 / 33 | Steady | 0 (0.0%) | 0 / 99 |
| Residents | 100 (0.1%) | N/A | 0 (0.0%) | 0 / 33 | N/A | 0 (0.0%) | 0 / 99 |
| Independent Liberal | 32 (0.0%) | Steady | 0 (0.0%) | 0 / 33 | Steady | 0 (0.0%) | 0 / 99 |
| Independent Labour | 25 (0.0%) | Steady | 0 (0.0%) | 0 / 33 | Steady | 0 (0.0%) | 0 / 99 |
| Communist League | 22 (0.0%) | Steady | 0 (0.0%) | 0 / 33 | Steady | 0 (0.0%) | 0 / 99 |

↓
| 78 | 21 |

== Ward results ==
=== Ardwick ===
Ardwick
| Party | Candidate | Votes | % | ±% |
|---|---|---|---|---|
| Labour | Thomas O'Callaghan* | 776 | 76.3 | +0.0 |
| Liberal Democrats | Karen Farnen | 95 | 9.3 | −0.9 |
| Conservative | Paul Kierman | 90 | 8.8 | −0.3 |
| Green | Bruce Bingham | 56 | 5.5 | +1.1 |
| Majority | | 681 | 67.0 | +1.0 |
| Turnout | | 1,017 | 13.3 | −0.3 |
| Labour hold | | Swing | +0.4 | |

=== Baguley ===
Baguley
| Party | Candidate | Votes | % | ±% |
|---|---|---|---|---|
| Labour | Anthony Burns* | 971 | 65.4 | −7.3 |
| Conservative | Ralph Ellerton | 297 | 20.0 | +2.6 |
| Liberal Democrats | William Fisher | 183 | 12.3 | +2.4 |
| Green | Gareth Pittam | 33 | 2.2 | +2.2 |
| Majority | | 674 | 45.4 | −9.9 |
| Turnout | | 1,484 | 18.3 | −0.9 |
| Labour hold | | Swing | -4.9 | |

=== Barlow Moor ===
Barlow Moor
| Party | Candidate | Votes | % | ±% |
|---|---|---|---|---|
| Liberal Democrats | Simon Wheale* | 1,258 | 56.2 | +0.7 |
| Labour | Jonathan Whitehead | 574 | 25.7 | −9.8 |
| Conservative | Thomas Bumby | 271 | 12.1 | +6.6 |
| Green | Brian Candeland | 79 | 3.5 | +0.0 |
| Residents | David Aldred | 55 | 2.5 | +2.5 |
| Majority | | 684 | 30.6 | +10.6 |
| Turnout | | 2,237 | 21.0 | −5.6 |
| Liberal Democrats hold | | Swing | +5.2 | |

=== Benchill ===
Benchill
| Party | Candidate | Votes | % | ±% |
|---|---|---|---|---|
| Labour | Veronica Myers* | 556 | 69.3 | −10.4 |
| Liberal Democrats | Ann Bradshaw | 109 | 13.6 | +2.4 |
| Conservative | Carol Roberts | 99 | 12.3 | +3.2 |
| Socialist Labour | Paul Arnold | 25 | 3.1 | +3.1 |
| Green | Roy Snape | 13 | 1.6 | +1.6 |
| Majority | | 447 | 55.7 | −12.8 |
| Turnout | | 802 | 11.7 | −1.9 |
| Labour hold | | Swing | -6.4 | |

=== Beswick and Clayton ===
Beswick and Clayton
| Party | Candidate | Votes | % | ±% |
|---|---|---|---|---|
| Liberal Democrats | Mark Clayton* | 832 | 47.9 | +9.0 |
| Labour | Mick Loughman | 807 | 46.4 | −10.0 |
| Conservative | Raymond Wattenbach | 87 | 5.0 | +0.4 |
| Green | Michael Brennan | 12 | 0.7 | +0.7 |
| Majority | | 25 | 1.5 | −16.0 |
| Turnout | | 1,738 | 25.2 | +0.4 |
| Liberal Democrats hold | | Swing | +9.5 | |

=== Blackley ===
Blackley
| Party | Candidate | Votes | % | ±% |
|---|---|---|---|---|
| Labour | Kenneth Barnes* | 934 | 56.3 | −3.6 |
| Liberal Democrats | Carol Connell | 445 | 26.8 | −1.4 |
| Conservative | Dorothy Keller | 238 | 14.4 | +2.4 |
| Green | Michael Shaw | 41 | 2.5 | +2.5 |
| Majority | | 489 | 29.5 | −2.2 |
| Turnout | | 1,658 | 20.7 | +1.7 |
| Labour hold | | Swing | -1.1 | |

=== Bradford ===
Bradford
| Party | Candidate | Votes | % | ±% |
|---|---|---|---|---|
| Labour | John Smith | 842 | 50.6 | +8.1 |
| Liberal Democrats | Elaine Boyes | 697 | 41.9 | −12.7 |
| Conservative | Brian Birchenough | 97 | 5.8 | +2.8 |
| Green | Robert Allen | 28 | 1.7 | +1.7 |
| Majority | | 145 | 8.7 | −3.4 |
| Turnout | | 1,664 | 24.0 | −0.6 |
| Labour hold | | Swing | +10.4 | |

=== Brooklands ===
Brooklands
| Party | Candidate | Votes | % | ±% |
|---|---|---|---|---|
| Labour | Susan Cooley* | 948 | 50.8 | −6.7 |
| Conservative | John Kenny | 733 | 39.3 | +9.2 |
| Liberal Democrats | Peter Rothery | 133 | 7.1 | −5.3 |
| Green | Zoe Whiteman | 53 | 2.8 | +2.8 |
| Majority | | 215 | 11.5 | −15.9 |
| Turnout | | 1,867 | 23.0 | +3.0 |
| Labour hold | | Swing | -7.9 | |

=== Burnage ===
Burnage
| Party | Candidate | Votes | % | ±% |
|---|---|---|---|---|
| Labour | Kathleen Robinson* | 956 | 45.4 | −15.3 |
| Liberal Democrats | John Cameron | 567 | 26.9 | +11.6 |
| Conservative | Peter Schofield | 372 | 17.7 | −1.7 |
| Green | Adrian Crawford | 210 | 10.0 | +6.6 |
| Majority | | 389 | 18.5 | −22.7 |
| Turnout | | 2,105 | 21.9 | +0.6 |
| Labour hold | | Swing | -13.4 | |

=== Central ===
Central
| Party | Candidate | Votes | % | ±% |
|---|---|---|---|---|
| Liberal Democrats | Marc Ramsbottom | 991 | 56.4 | +30.0 |
| Labour | Frank Duffy | 630 | 35.8 | −25.2 |
| Conservative | Nicholas Davis | 80 | 4.6 | −3.8 |
| Green | Elvis Presley | 49 | 2.8 | −1.4 |
| Independent | Jason Ripley | 8 | 0.5 | +0.5 |
| Majority | | 361 | 20.5 | −14.2 |
| Turnout | | 1,758 | 19.0 | +5.8 |
| Liberal Democrats gain from Labour | | Swing | +27.6 | |

=== Charlestown ===
Charlestown
| Party | Candidate | Votes | % | ±% |
|---|---|---|---|---|
| Labour | Mark Hackett* | 924 | 57.0 | −4.9 |
| Liberal Democrats | Rodney Isherwood | 605 | 37.3 | +12.2 |
| Green | Claudia French | 92 | 5.7 | +5.7 |
| Majority | | 319 | 19.7 | −17.2 |
| Turnout | | 1,621 | 19.6 | +0.4 |
| Labour hold | | Swing | -8.5 | |

=== Cheetham ===
Cheetham
| Party | Candidate | Votes | % | ±% |
|---|---|---|---|---|
| Labour | Mohammed Khan | 1,602 | 52.0 | −10.5 |
| Liberal Democrats | Qassim Afzal* | 1,382 | 44.9 | +14.3 |
| Green | Ashleigh Vincent | 96 | 3.1 | +1.3 |
| Majority | | 220 | 7.1 | −24.8 |
| Turnout | | 3,080 | 35.8 | +4.0 |
| Labour gain from Liberal Democrats | | Swing | -12.4 | |

=== Chorlton ===
Chorlton
| Party | Candidate | Votes | % | ±% |
|---|---|---|---|---|
| Labour | Valerie Stevens* | 1,505 | 47.5 | −1.1 |
| Conservative | Ian Paley | 656 | 20.7 | +0.9 |
| Green | Anne Power | 536 | 16.9 | −2.1 |
| Liberal Democrats | Antony Bethell | 474 | 14.9 | +2.3 |
| Majority | | 849 | 26.8 | −2.0 |
| Turnout | | 3,171 | 27.0 | −1.4 |
| Labour hold | | Swing | -1.0 | |

=== Crumpsall ===
Crumpsall
| Party | Candidate | Votes | % | ±% |
|---|---|---|---|---|
| Labour | Richard Leese | 1,447 | 66.4 | −2.4 |
| Conservative | Jacqueline Rowland | 444 | 20.4 | +3.8 |
| Liberal Democrats | Andrew Steele | 210 | 9.6 | −1.6 |
| Green | Julian Parry | 78 | 3.6 | +0.1 |
| Majority | | 1,003 | 46.0 | −6.2 |
| Turnout | | 2,179 | 24.6 | +0.9 |
| Labour hold | | Swing | -3.1 | |

=== Didsbury ===
Didsbury
| Party | Candidate | Votes | % | ±% |
|---|---|---|---|---|
| Liberal Democrats | Tony Parkinson | 1,706 | 44.5 | −0.1 |
| Labour | Frances Ives | 1,212 | 31.6 | −1.0 |
| Conservative | Peter Hilton | 751 | 19.6 | −3.2 |
| Green | Michael Daw | 163 | 4.3 | +4.3 |
| Majority | | 494 | 12.9 | +0.9 |
| Turnout | | 3,832 | 34.1 | −1.0 |
| Liberal Democrats gain from Labour | | Swing | +0.5 | |

=== Fallowfield ===
Fallowfield
| Party | Candidate | Votes | % | ±% |
|---|---|---|---|---|
| Labour | David Royle* | 1,013 | 62.3 | +3.3 |
| Conservative | Simon Davenport | 275 | 16.9 | +1.8 |
| Liberal Democrats | Lynne Williams | 217 | 13.3 | −6.6 |
| Green | Hannah Berry | 122 | 7.5 | +2.5 |
| Majority | | 738 | 45.4 | +6.3 |
| Turnout | | 1,627 | 13.8 | +0.2 |
| Labour hold | | Swing | +0.7 | |

=== Gorton North ===
Gorton North
| Party | Candidate | Votes | % | ±% |
|---|---|---|---|---|
| Liberal Democrats | Iain Donaldson* | 1,060 | 46.1 | −8.4 |
| Labour | Richard Unwin | 942 | 40.9 | +0.6 |
| Conservative | Joyce Haydock | 137 | 6.0 | +0.7 |
| Independent | Trevor Mooney | 122 | 5.3 | +5.3 |
| Green | Paul Slater | 40 | 1.7 | +1.7 |
| Majority | | 118 | 5.1 | −9.1 |
| Turnout | | 2,301 | 24.8 | −1.4 |
| Liberal Democrats hold | | Swing | -4.5 | |

=== Gorton South ===
Gorton South
| Party | Candidate | Votes | % | ±% |
|---|---|---|---|---|
| Liberal Democrats | Simon Ashley* | 1,178 | 61.2 | +0.3 |
| Labour | Kenneth Strath | 625 | 32.5 | −3.4 |
| Conservative | Ann Hodkinson | 68 | 3.5 | +0.3 |
| Green | Penelope Collins | 54 | 2.8 | +2.8 |
| Majority | | 553 | 28.7 | +3.6 |
| Turnout | | 1,925 | 21.8 | −3.2 |
| Liberal Democrats hold | | Swing | +1.8 | |

=== Harpurhey ===
Harpurhey
| Party | Candidate | Votes | % | ±% |
|---|---|---|---|---|
| Labour | Joanne Green* | 725 | 63.7 | −3.3 |
| Liberal Democrats | Daniel Campbell | 198 | 17.4 | −3.0 |
| Conservative | Rodney Keller | 180 | 15.8 | +3.2 |
| Green | Olive Bowers | 36 | 3.2 | +3.2 |
| Majority | | 527 | 46.3 | −0.3 |
| Turnout | | 1,139 | 15.3 | −0.0 |
| Labour hold | | Swing | -0.1 | |

=== Hulme ===
Hulme
| Party | Candidate | Votes | % | ±% |
|---|---|---|---|---|
| Labour | Gerry Diamond | 504 | 52.6 | −2.7 |
| Green | Vanessa Hall | 359 | 37.4 | +20.1 |
| Conservative | David Conway | 64 | 6.7 | +0.9 |
| Independent Liberal | Charles Lyn-Lloyd | 32 | 3.3 | +1.4 |
| Majority | | 145 | 15.1 | −20.4 |
| Turnout | | 959 | 10.6 | −3.0 |
| Labour hold | | Swing | -11.4 | |

=== Levenshulme ===
Levenshulme
| Party | Candidate | Votes | % | ±% |
|---|---|---|---|---|
| Liberal Democrats | John Commons* | 1,419 | 58.6 | +1.4 |
| Labour | Nicholas Macgregor | 693 | 28.6 | −2.0 |
| Conservative | Richard West | 150 | 6.2 | +2.5 |
| Green | Philip Maile | 139 | 5.7 | +2.7 |
| Communist League | Paul Galloway | 22 | 0.9 | +0.9 |
| Majority | | 726 | 30.0 | +3.3 |
| Turnout | | 2,423 | 24.9 | −1.0 |
| Liberal Democrats hold | | Swing | +1.7 | |

=== Lightbowne ===
Lightbowne
| Party | Candidate | Votes | % | ±% |
|---|---|---|---|---|
| Labour | William Risby* | 987 | 64.6 | −7.1 |
| Liberal Democrats | David Gordon | 428 | 28.0 | +15.4 |
| Green | Simon Chislett | 114 | 7.5 | +7.5 |
| Majority | | 559 | 36.6 | −19.3 |
| Turnout | | 1,529 | 19.2 | −0.9 |
| Labour hold | | Swing | -11.2 | |

=== Longsight ===
Longsight
| Party | Candidate | Votes | % | ±% |
|---|---|---|---|---|
| Labour | Aftab Ahmed | 1,461 | 62.1 | +13.0 |
| Green | Spencer Fitzgibbon | 382 | 16.2 | −0.1 |
| Conservative | Karen Abbad | 268 | 11.4 | +2.9 |
| Liberal Democrats | Rashid Ahmed | 233 | 9.9 | −15.8 |
| Independent | Comrade Ibrahim | 8 | 0.3 | −0.1 |
| Majority | | 1,079 | 45.9 | +22.5 |
| Turnout | | 2,352 | 18.1 | −4.2 |
| Labour hold | | Swing | +6.5 | |

=== Moss Side ===
Moss Side
| Party | Candidate | Votes | % | ±% |
|---|---|---|---|---|
| Labour | Fergal McCullough | 989 | 75.2 | −2.1 |
| Conservative | Mary Barnes | 134 | 10.2 | +1.1 |
| Liberal Democrats | Peter Jinks | 113 | 8.6 | +1.8 |
| Green | Michelle Allen | 79 | 6.0 | −0.8 |
| Majority | | 855 | 65.0 | −3.2 |
| Turnout | | 1,315 | 15.8 | −0.7 |
| Labour hold | | Swing | -1.6 | |

=== Moston ===
Moston
| Party | Candidate | Votes | % | ±% |
|---|---|---|---|---|
| Labour | Patrick Mullins* | 1,004 | 59.3 | −9.9 |
| Liberal Democrats | Andrew Appleyard | 554 | 32.7 | +16.1 |
| Socialist Labour | Kenneth Barr | 85 | 5.0 | +5.0 |
| Green | Barry McAtarsney | 50 | 3.0 | +3.0 |
| Majority | | 450 | 26.6 | −26.0 |
| Turnout | | 1,693 | 17.6 | −4.3 |
| Labour hold | | Swing | -13.0 | |

=== Newton Heath ===
Newton Heath
| Party | Candidate | Votes | % | ±% |
|---|---|---|---|---|
| Labour | Christine Carroll | 836 | 70.3 | −8.3 |
| Conservative | Albert Walsh | 191 | 16.1 | +6.5 |
| Liberal Democrats | Ann Rodgers | 115 | 9.7 | +0.3 |
| Green | Rachel Harper | 47 | 4.0 | +1.6 |
| Majority | | 645 | 54.2 | −14.8 |
| Turnout | | 1,189 | 15.0 | −2.5 |
| Labour hold | | Swing | -7.4 | |

=== Northenden ===
Northenden
| Party | Candidate | Votes | % | ±% |
|---|---|---|---|---|
| Labour | Steven Conquest | 945 | 50.9 | −9.1 |
| Conservative | Helen Goldthorpe | 458 | 24.7 | +7.0 |
| Liberal Democrats | Janice Redmond | 231 | 12.5 | +1.3 |
| Green | Lance Crookes | 221 | 11.9 | −0.2 |
| Majority | | 487 | 26.3 | −15.0 |
| Turnout | | 1,855 | 19.6 | −1.5 |
| Labour hold | | Swing | -8.0 | |

=== Old Moat ===
Old Moat
| Party | Candidate | Votes | % | ±% |
|---|---|---|---|---|
| Labour | Brian Harrison* | 1,523 | 47.1 | −2.5 |
| Liberal Democrats | Yasmin Zalzala | 1,413 | 43.7 | +2.7 |
| Conservative | Graham Betton | 139 | 4.3 | −1.1 |
| Green | Ernest Roberts | 104 | 3.2 | −0.9 |
| Residents | Thomas Franklin | 45 | 1.4 | +1.4 |
| Independent Labour | Kevin Robinson | 10 | 0.3 | +0.3 |
| Majority | | 110 | 3.4 | −5.2 |
| Turnout | | 3,234 | 26.0 | +0.4 |
| Labour hold | | Swing | -2.6 | |

=== Rusholme ===
Rusholme
| Party | Candidate | Votes | % | ±% |
|---|---|---|---|---|
| Liberal Democrats | Paul Shannon | 1,613 | 58.1 | +14.0 |
| Labour | Jawaid Chaudhry | 930 | 33.5 | −11.8 |
| Conservative | Daniel Bunting | 116 | 4.2 | −1.8 |
| Green | Adam Higgin | 100 | 3.6 | −1.1 |
| Independent Labour | Michael Robinson | 15 | 0.5 | +0.5 |
| Majority | | 683 | 24.6 | +23.4 |
| Turnout | | 2,774 | 22.3 | +0.9 |
| Liberal Democrats gain from Labour | | Swing | +12.9 | |

=== Sharston ===
Sharston
| Party | Candidate | Votes | % | ±% |
|---|---|---|---|---|
| Labour | Griffith Berry* | 683 | 62.7 | −9.1 |
| Conservative | David Russell | 214 | 19.7 | +5.3 |
| Liberal Democrats | David Kierman | 148 | 13.6 | +2.8 |
| Green | Steven Anderson | 44 | 4.0 | +1.0 |
| Majority | | 469 | 43.1 | −14.4 |
| Turnout | | 1,089 | 14.9 | −1.8 |
| Labour hold | | Swing | -7.2 | |

=== Whalley Range ===
Whalley Range
| Party | Candidate | Votes | % | ±% |
|---|---|---|---|---|
| Labour | Kathleen Fry* | 1,482 | 56.3 | +5.9 |
| Conservative | John Kershaw | 716 | 27.2 | +5.5 |
| Liberal Democrats | Howard Toity | 261 | 9.9 | −13.1 |
| Green | Mary Candeland | 175 | 6.6 | +6.6 |
| Majority | | 766 | 29.1 | +1.7 |
| Turnout | | 2,634 | 26.8 | −2.1 |
| Labour hold | | Swing | +0.2 | |

=== Withington ===
Withington
| Party | Candidate | Votes | % | ±% |
|---|---|---|---|---|
| Liberal Democrats | Alison Firth* | 1,586 | 61.3 | +3.9 |
| Labour | Pamela Smyth | 595 | 23.0 | −8.7 |
| Conservative | Jonathan Smith | 209 | 8.1 | +2.3 |
| Green | Susan Thorpe | 198 | 7.7 | +2.5 |
| Majority | | 991 | 38.3 | +12.6 |
| Turnout | | 2,588 | 21.9 | −4.1 |
| Liberal Democrats hold | | Swing | +6.3 | |

=== Woodhouse Park ===
Woodhouse Park
| Party | Candidate | Votes | % | ±% |
|---|---|---|---|---|
| Labour | Leo Collins* | 757 | 69.3 | −8.0 |
| Conservative | Ruby Raynor | 159 | 14.5 | +3.2 |
| Liberal Democrats | Derek Mellor | 141 | 12.9 | +1.6 |
| Green | Barbara Lally | 36 | 3.3 | +3.3 |
| Majority | | 598 | 54.7 | −11.3 |
| Turnout | | 1,093 | 14.3 | −1.6 |
| Labour hold | | Swing | -5.6 | |

== By-elections between 2000 and 2002 ==
Baguley By-Election 25 January 2001
| Party | Candidate | Votes | % | ±% |
|---|---|---|---|---|
| Labour | Edward McCulley | 685 | 60.0 | −5.4 |
| Liberal Democrats | William Fisher | 241 | 21.1 | +8.8 |
| Conservative | David Timson | 216 | 18.9 | −1.1 |
| Majority | | 444 | 38.9 | −6.5 |
| Turnout | | 1,142 | 13.0 | −5.3 |
| Labour hold | | Swing | -7.1 | |

Beswick and Clayton 10 June 2001
| Party | Candidate | Votes | % | ±% |
|---|---|---|---|---|
| Labour | Michael Loughman | 1,850 | 61.9 | +15.5 |
| Liberal Democrats | Elaine Boyes | 988 | 33.0 | −14.9 |
| Conservative | Richard West | 153 | 5.1 | +0.1 |
| Majority | | 862 | 28.9 | +27.4 |
| Turnout | | 2,991 | | |
| Labour hold | | Swing | +15.2 | |

Sharston By-Election 10 June 2001
| Party | Candidate | Votes | % | ±% |
|---|---|---|---|---|
| Labour | Thomas Judge | 2,170 | 69.8 | +7.1 |
| Conservative | David Timson | 497 | 16.0 | −3.7 |
| Liberal Democrats | David Kierman | 440 | 14.2 | +0.6 |
| Majority | | 1,673 | 53.8 | +10.7 |
| Turnout | | 3,107 | | |
| Labour hold | | Swing | +5.4 | |

Whalley Range By-Election 10 June 2001
| Party | Candidate | Votes | % | ±% |
|---|---|---|---|---|
| Labour | Anthony Dale | 3,266 | 62.4 | +6.1 |
| Liberal Democrats | John Grant | 1,221 | 23.3 | +13.4 |
| Conservative | John Kershaw | 744 | 14.2 | −13.0 |
| Majority | | 2,045 | 39.1 | +10.0 |
| Turnout | | 5,231 | | |
| Labour hold | | Swing | -3.6 | |
