= Joseph Massel =

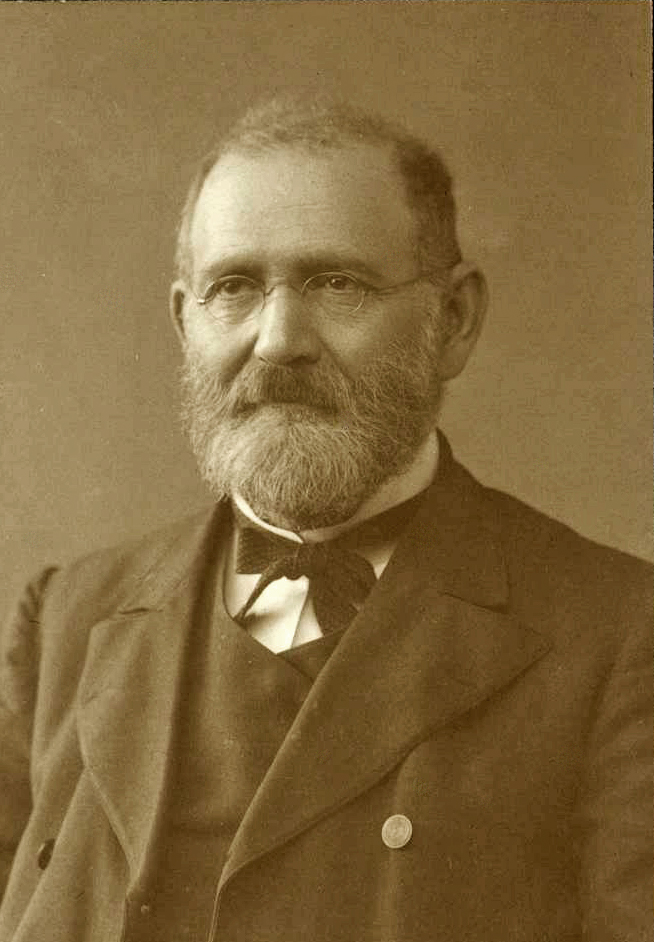
Joseph Massel

Joseph Massel (also Yoysef Yechezkel Mazl), born in Wjasin near Vilna, Russia, 1850; d. Manchester, 1912) was a Zionist activist, writer, Hebrew poet and translator.

== Biography ==
Massel emigrated from Russia to Manchester, England in 1895 where he worked as a printer.

Massel was a pioneer in the promotion of Hebrew as the national language, publishing works by Israel Cohen and Harry Sacher among others. He wrote Hebrew poems and translated English classics into Hebrew, including Milton's Samon Agonistes, Longfellow's Judas Maccabaeus and Fitzgerald's Omar Khayyam. He also spent two years preparing a unique collection of 94 portraits called A Gallery of Hebrew Poets; 1725–1903.

By the time Chaim Weizmann arrived in Manchester in 1904, Massel was living in a small street of the lower end of Cheetham Hill Road (where his Hebrew printing works was based) across from Red Bank and not far from the Central Synagogue. He was much part of Manchester's Zionist community and was a vice-president of the Manchester Zionist Association. At that time he was the only person Weizmann knew in Manchester.

Massel attended the First Zionist Congress (Basle, 1897) and had probably met Weizmann at the Second Zionist Congress (Basle, 1898). Showing Weizmann hospitality he never forgot, Massel collected him from the train station, put him up for the night and arranged lodgings for him the next day. Massel also introduced Weizmann to Charles Dreyfus. Weizmann was later to refer to Massel as a "veritable angel" and described his Friday evening visits to the Massel household as "the highlights of my life".
