= 1992 Manchester City Council election =

1992 UK local government election

- 7 May 1992

34 of 99 seats to Manchester City Council 50 seats needed for a majority
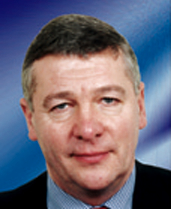
	First party	Second party	Third party
Leader	Graham Stringer	Keith Whitmore	Peter Hilton
Party	Labour	Liberal Democrats	Conservative
Leader's seat	Harpurhey	Levenshulme	Didsbury
Last election	27 seats, 50.3%	5 seats, 19.6%	2 seats, 24.3%
Seats before	83	9	5
Seats won	27	5	2
Seats after	80	12	5
Seat change	▼3	▲3	Steady
Popular vote	43,405	16,727	25,841
Percentage	48.9%	18.8%	29.1%
Swing	▼1.4%	▼0.8%	▲4.8%
	Fourth party
Leader	Margaret Manning
Party	Independent Labour
Leader's seat	Rusholme
Last election	did not contest
Seats before	2
Seats won	0
Seats after	2
Seat change	Steady
Popular vote	262
Percentage	0.3%
Swing	N/A
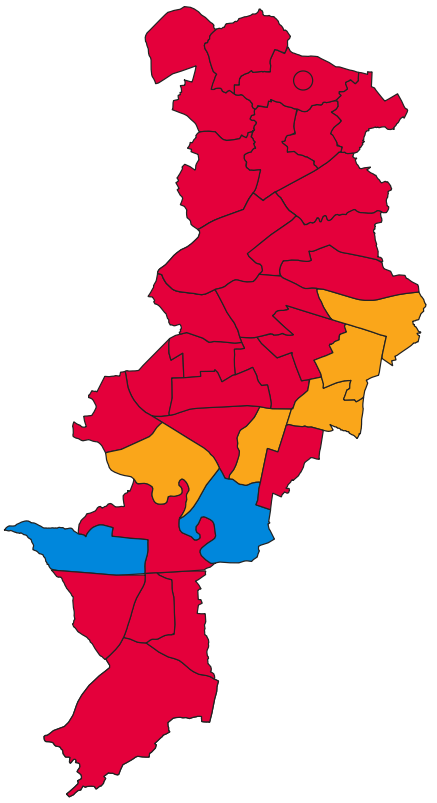
- Map of results of 1992 election
Leader of the Council before election
Graham Stringer
Labour
Leader of the Council after election
Graham Stringer
Labour

Elections to Manchester City Council were held on Thursday, 7 May 1992. One third of the council was up for election, with each successful candidate to serve a four-year term of office, expiring in 1996. The Labour Party retained overall control of the Council.

== Election result ==
Party	Votes		Seats			Full Council	
Labour Party	43,405 (48.9%)	▼1.4	27 (79.4%)	27 / 34	▼3	80 (80.8%)	80 / 99
Liberal Democrats	16,727 (18.8%)	▼0.8	5 (14.7%)	5 / 34	▲3	12 (12.1%)	12 / 99
Conservative Party	25,841 (24.3%)	▲4.8	2 (5.9%)	2 / 34	Steady	5 (5.1%)	5 / 99
Independent Labour	262 (0.3%)	N/A	0 (0.0%)	0 / 34	Steady	2 (2.0%)	2 / 99
Green Party	2,562 (2.9%)	▼1.3	0 (0.0%)	0 / 34	Steady	0 (0.0%)	0 / 99

↓
2	80	12	5

== Ward results ==
=== Ardwick ===
Ardwick
Party	Candidate	Votes	%	±%
Labour	E. Hopkins*	1,010	72.6	+1.7
Conservative	M. Payne	206	14.8	+2.4
Liberal Democrats	L. Ford	115	8.3	−3.2
Green	A. Salter	61	4.4	−0.8
Majority		804	57.8	−0.7
Turnout		1,392		
Labour hold		Swing	-0.3	

=== Baguley ===
Baguley
Party	Candidate	Votes	%	±%
Labour	A. Burns*	1,285	53.3	−11.9
Conservative	V. Kirby	912	37.8	+3.0
Liberal Democrats	A. Leech	170	7.0	+7.0
Green	J. Booty	45	1.9	+1.9
Majority		373	15.5	−15.0
Turnout		2,412		
Labour hold		Swing	-7.4	

=== Barlow Moor ===
Barlow Moor
Party	Candidate	Votes	%	±%
Liberal Democrats	S. Wheale	1,644	48.5	+2.6
Labour	G. Betney	1,128	33.3	+1.2
Conservative	N. Murphy	489	14.4	−1.5
Green	H. Bramwell	127	3.7	−2.4
Majority		516	15.2	+1.4
Turnout		3,388		
Liberal Democrats gain from Labour		Swing	+0.7	

=== Benchill ===
Benchill
Party	Candidate	Votes	%	±%
Labour	V. Myers*	979	67.8	−4.0
Conservative	T. Roberts	311	21.5	+8.0
Liberal Democrats	M. Dunn	154	10.7	−3.9
Majority		668	46.3	−10.9
Turnout		1,444		
Labour hold		Swing	-6.0	

=== Beswick and Clayton ===
Beswick and Clayton
Party	Candidate	Votes	%	±%
Labour	J. Flanagan*	1,182	63.1	−2.7
Liberal Democrats	K. Dobson	376	20.1	+8.7
Conservative	D. Russell	315	16.8	−2.3
Majority		806	43.0	−3.7
Turnout		1,873		
Labour hold		Swing	-5.7	

=== Blackley ===
Blackley
Party	Candidate	Votes	%	±%
Labour	K. Barnes*	1,228	54.4	−1.9
Conservative	K. Potter	792	35.1	+11.5
Liberal Democrats	K. Wadsworth	239	10.6	−9.5
Majority		436	19.3	−13.3
Turnout		2,259		
Labour hold		Swing	-6.7	

=== Bradford ===
Bradford
Party	Candidate	Votes	%	±%
Labour	P. Kelly	992	62.9	−7.5
Conservative	C. Birchenough	373	23.7	+8.2
Liberal Democrats	M. Dunican	163	10.3	−1.2
Green	M. Daw	48	3.0	+0.4
Majority		619	39.3	−15.5
Turnout		1,576		
Labour hold		Swing	-7.8	

=== Brooklands ===
Brooklands
Party	Candidate	Votes	%	±%
Conservative	H. Cummins*	2,033	54.3	+8.7
Labour	A. Harding	1,426	38.1	−2.9
Liberal Democrats	H. McKay	207	5.5	−4.4
Green	R. Cooke	76	2.0	−1.6
Majority		607	16.2	+11.6
Turnout		3,742		
Conservative hold		Swing	+5.8	

=== Burnage ===
Burnage
Party	Candidate	Votes	%	±%
Labour	A. Williams	1,363	43.0	−3.5
Conservative	J. Leach	1,282	40.5	+5.3
Liberal Democrats	R. Harrison	418	13.2	−1.2
Green	P. Thompson	104	3.3	−0.6
Majority		81	3.0	−8.3
Turnout		3,167		
Labour hold		Swing	-4.4	

=== Central ===
Central
Party	Candidate	Votes	%	±%
Labour	G. Conquest*	883	72.5	+0.2
Conservative	A. Hudson	172	14.1	+3.1
Liberal Democrats	J. Bridges	111	9.1	−2.0
Green	P. Harrison	52	4.3	−1.3
Majority		711	58.4	−2.8
Turnout		1,218		
Labour hold		Swing	-1.4	

=== Charlestown ===
Charlestown
Party	Candidate	Votes	%	±%
Labour	M. Hackett	1,294	53.5	−1.8
Labour	E. Curley*	1,288		
Conservative	V. Clarke	892	36.9	+9.9
Conservative	H. Coombes	800		
Liberal Democrats	J. Laslett	231	9.6	−8.1
Liberal Democrats	L. Thornhill	200		
Majority		396	16.6	−11.6
Turnout		2,417		
Labour hold		Swing		
Labour hold		Swing	-5.8	

=== Cheetham ===
Cheetham
Party	Candidate	Votes	%	±%
Labour	A. Eko	1,201	68.8	−4.5
Conservative	K. Hyde	339	19.4	+8.1
Liberal Democrats	R. Clayton	205	11.7	+1.6
Majority		862	49.4	−12.6
Turnout		1,745		
Labour hold		Swing	-6.3	

=== Chorlton ===
Chorlton
Party	Candidate	Votes	%	±%
Labour	M. Langford	2,214	50.7	+10.9
Conservative	I. Bradshaw	1,548	35.5	+2.2
Liberal Democrats	S. Oliver	310	7.1	−6.1
Green	B. Candeland	294	6.7	−7.0
Majority		666	15.3	+8.8
Turnout		4,366		
Labour hold		Swing	+4.3	

=== Crumpsall ===
Crumpsall
Party	Candidate	Votes	%	±%
Labour	R. Leese*	1,575	52.0	+5.8
Conservative	P. Wells	1,224	40.4	+2.2
Liberal Democrats	D. Gordon	231	7.6	−3.0
Majority		351	11.6	+3.6
Turnout		3,030		
Labour hold		Swing	+1.8	

=== Didsbury ===
Didsbury
Party	Candidate	Votes	%	±%
Conservative	P. Hilton*	2,514	50.2	−1.3
Labour	G. Bridson	1,586	31.7	−0.7
Liberal Democrats	J. Lawley	778	15.5	+3.6
Green	R. Goater	131	2.6	−1.6
Majority		928	18.5	−0.5
Turnout		5,009		
Conservative hold		Swing	-0.3	

=== Fallowfield ===
Fallowfield
Party	Candidate	Votes	%	±%
Labour	S. Done	1,329	56.2	+5.3
Conservative	J. Nelson	638	27.0	−0.9
Liberal Democrats	B. Jones	396	17.0	+4.5
Majority		691	29.2	+6.2
Turnout		2,363		
Labour hold		Swing	+3.1	

=== Gorton North ===
Gorton North
Party	Candidate	Votes	%	±%
Liberal Democrats	I. Donaldson	1,763	50.5	−2.5
Labour	T. Hamnett*	1,403	40.2	+7.4
Conservative	R. West	278	8.0	+1.8
Green	S. Fitzgibbon	45	1.3	+0.3
Majority		360	10.3	−9.9
Turnout		3,489		
Liberal Democrats gain from Labour		Swing	-4.9	

=== Gorton South ===
Gorton South
Party	Candidate	Votes	%	±%
Liberal Democrats	S. Ashley	1,559	49.5	−3.2
Labour	B. Stone*	1,331	42.2	+2.4
Conservative	R. Ignatowicz	188	6.0	+0.7
Green	M. Shaw	73	2.3	+0.1
Majority		228	7.2	−5.7
Turnout		3,151		
Liberal Democrats gain from Labour		Swing	-2.8	

=== Harpurhey ===
Harpurhey
Party	Candidate	Votes	%	±%
Labour	G. Stringer*	1,096	53.9	−4.4
Conservative	D. Keller	486	23.9	+2.3
Independent Labour	A. Shannon	262	12.9	+12.9
Liberal Democrats	V. Towers	189	9.3	−6.0
Majority		610	30.0	−6.6
Turnout		2,033		
Labour hold		Swing	-3.3	

=== Hulme ===
Hulme
Party	Candidate	Votes	%	±%
Labour	K. Rowswell	763	68.3	+0.0
Conservative	D. Williams	150	13.4	+3.6
Green	P. Williamson	117	10.5	−2.5
Liberal Democrats	I. Newton	87	7.8	−1.1
Majority		613	54.9	−0.4
Turnout		1,117		
Labour hold		Swing	-1.8	

=== Levenshulme ===
Levenshulme
Party	Candidate	Votes	%	±%
Liberal Democrats	J. Commons*	2,105	56.6	−5.0
Labour	J. Brown	1,024	27.5	+1.4
Conservative	A. Soane	408	11.0	+3.3
Green	L. Crookes	185	5.0	+0.5
Majority		1,081	29.0	−6.5
Turnout		3,722		
Liberal Democrats hold		Swing	-3.2	

=== Lightbowne ===
Lightbowne
Party	Candidate	Votes	%	±%
Labour	W. Risby*	1,709	58.4	+4.1
Conservative	M. Steadman	929	31.7	+4.2
Liberal Democrats	P. Matthews	288	9.8	−8.5
Majority		780	26.7	−0.1
Turnout		2,926		
Labour hold		Swing	-0.0	

=== Longsight ===
Longsight
Party	Candidate	Votes	%	±%
Labour	K. Robinson*	1,673	54.0	+1.9
Conservative	M. Naqui	976	31.5	+6.1
Liberal Democrats	B. Pierce	265	8.6	−1.9
Green	J. Denham	184	5.9	−5.4
Majority		697	22.5	−4.9
Turnout		3,098		
Labour hold		Swing	-2.1	

=== Moss Side ===
Moss Side
Party	Candidate	Votes	%	±%
Labour	V. Young*	1,331	74.4	−8.4
Liberal Democrats	G. Neal	308	17.2	+9.6
Green	P. Boast	149	8.3	+8.3
Majority		1,023	57.2	−16.1
Turnout		1,788		
Labour hold		Swing	-9.0	

=== Moston ===
Moston
Party	Candidate	Votes	%	±%
Labour	M. Enderby	1,546	50.4	+0.5
Conservative	F. Frost	1,269	41.3	+5.6
Liberal Democrats	N. Towers	254	8.3	−6.1
Majority		277	9.0	−5.2
Turnout		3,069		
Labour hold		Swing	-2.5	

=== Newton Heath ===
Newton Heath
Party	Candidate	Votes	%	±%
Labour	J. Smith*	1,153	63.6	−0.4
Conservative	P. Leach	469	25.9	+6.3
Liberal Democrats	C. Turner	192	10.6	−1.8
Majority		684	37.7	−6.6
Turnout		1,814		
Labour hold		Swing	-3.3	

=== Northenden ===
Northenden
Party	Candidate	Votes	%	±%
Labour	S. Bracegirdle	1,733	49.9	+2.2
Conservative	R. Caddick	1,426	41.0	+26.0
Liberal Democrats	M. Ford	240	6.9	+0.5
Green	G. Otten	76	2.2	+0.1
Majority		307	8.8	−10.2
Turnout		3,475		
Labour hold		Swing	-11.9	

=== Old Moat ===
Old Moat
Party	Candidate	Votes	%	±%
Labour	B. Harrison*	1,828	51.3	+2.6
Conservative	G. Betton	1,096	30.7	+0.0
Liberal Democrats	R. Johnston	450	12.6	−2.1
Green	S. Buchan	191	5.4	−0.5
Majority		732	20.5	+2.5
Turnout		3,565		
Labour hold		Swing	+1.3	

=== Rusholme ===
Rusholme
Party	Candidate	Votes	%	±%
Labour	Y. Mambu*	1,104	43.5	−9.8
Liberal Democrats	A. Chowdhury	799	31.5	+10.1
Conservative	R. Norris	444	17.5	+4.2
Green	B. Bingham	192	7.6	−4.5
Majority		305	12.0	−19.9
Turnout		2,539		
Labour hold		Swing	-9.9	

=== Sharston ===
Sharston
Party	Candidate	Votes	%	±%
Labour	G. Berry*	1,149	47.3	−6.9
Conservative	A. Bourne	943	38.8	+13.4
Liberal Democrats	S. Toole	235	9.7	−4.9
Green	G. Lawson	104	4.3	−1.5
Majority		206	8.5	−20.3
Turnout		2,431		
Labour hold		Swing	-10.1	

=== Whalley Range ===
Whalley Range
Party	Candidate	Votes	%	±%
Labour	K. Fry*	1,763	49.7	+0.5
Conservative	J. Kershaw	1,454	41.0	−0.3
Liberal Democrats	R. West	224	6.3	−3.2
Green	C. Collis	109	3.1	+3.1
Majority		309	8.7	+0.9
Turnout		3,550		
Labour hold		Swing	+0.4	

=== Withington ===
Withington
Party	Candidate	Votes	%	±%
Liberal Democrats	A. Firth*	1,642	44.5	+2.2
Labour	H. Smith	1,078	29.2	−4.7
Conservative	P. Davies	769	20.9	+3.5
Green	B. Ekbery	199	5.4	−1.1
Majority		564	15.3	+7.0
Turnout		3,688		
Liberal Democrats hold		Swing	+3.4	

=== Woodhouse Park ===
Woodhouse Park
Party	Candidate	Votes	%	±%
Labour	V. Dunn	1,046	53.9	−19.8
Conservative	A. Langan	516	26.6	+0.3
Liberal Democrats	W. Ford	379	19.5	+19.5
Majority		530	27.3	−20.1
Turnout		1,941		
Labour hold		Swing	-10.0	

== By-elections between 1992 and 1994 ==
=== Beswick and Clayton, 4 February 1993 ===
Caused by the resignation of Councillor Sidney Silverman (Labour, Beswick and Clayton, elected 4 May 1978; previously 1971-75) on 24 December 1993.

Beswick and Clayton
Party	Candidate	Votes	%	±%
Liberal Democrats	K. Dobson	1,824	65.1	+45.0
Labour	A. Harland	886	31.6	−31.5
Conservative	D. Russell	92	3.3	−13.5
Majority		938	33.5	−9.5
Turnout		2,802		
Liberal Democrats gain from Labour		Swing		

=== Gorton South, 25 March 1993 ===
Caused by the death of Councillor Dennis Barker (Labour, Gorton South, elected 7 May 1970; previously 1962-69) on 7 February 1993.

Gorton South
Party	Candidate	Votes	%	±%
Liberal Democrats	J. Bridges	2,005	58.1	+8.6
Labour	B. Stone	1,360	39.4	−2.8
Conservative	R. Ignatowicz	86	2.5	−3.5
Majority		645	18.7	+11.5
Turnout		3,451		
Liberal Democrats gain from Labour		Swing		

=== Chorlton, 29 April 1993 ===
Caused by the death of Councillor Chris Rogers (Labour, Chorlton, elected 2 May 1991) on 21 February 1993.

Chorlton
Party	Candidate	Votes	%	±%
Labour	G. Betney	2,092	48.5	−2.2
Liberal Democrats	B. Pierce	1,061	24.6	+17.5
Conservative	F. Roche	969	22.5	−13.0
Green	M. Steel	147	3.4	−3.3
Independent Labour	M. Scantlebury	40	0.9	N/A
Majority		1,031	23.9	+8.6
Turnout		4,309		
Labour hold		Swing		
