= 1991 Manchester City Council election =

1991 UK local government election

- 2 May 1991

34 of 99 seats to Manchester City Council 50 seats needed for a majority
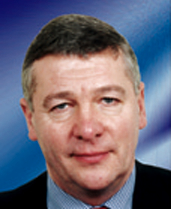
	First party	Second party	Third party
Leader	Graham Stringer	Keith Whitmore	Peter Hilton
Party	Labour	Liberal Democrats	Conservative
Leader's seat	Harpurhey	Levenshulme	Didsbury
Last election	31 seats, 58.6%	2 seats, 14.9%	1 seats, 19.3%
Seats before	79	8	10
Seats won	27	5	2
Seats after	85	9	5
Seat change	▲6	▲1	▼5
Popular vote	59,144	23,004	28,622
Percentage	50.3%	19.6%	24.3%
Swing	▼8.3%	▲4.7%	▲5.0%
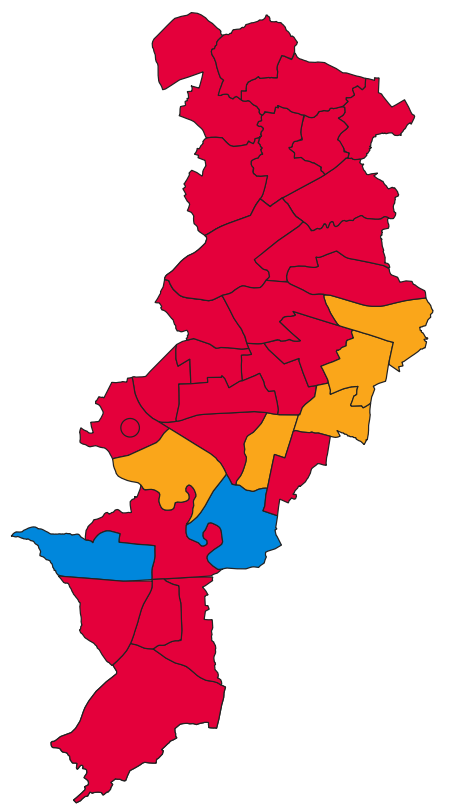
- Map of results of 1991 election
Leader of the Council before election
Graham Stringer
Labour
Leader of the Council after election
Graham Stringer
Labour

Elections to Manchester City Council were held on Thursday, 2 May 1991. One third of the council was up for election, with each successful candidate to serve a four-year term of office, expiring in 1995. The Labour Party retained overall control of the Council.

== Election results ==
Party	Votes		Seats			Full Council	
Labour Party	59,144 (50.3%)	▼8.3	27 (79.4%)	27 / 34	▲6	85 (85.8%)	85 / 99
Liberal Democrats	23,004 (19.6%)	▲4.7	5 (14.7%)	5 / 34	▲1	9 (9.1%)	9 / 99
Conservative Party	28,622 (24.3%)	▲5.0	2 (5.9%)	2 / 34	▼5	5 (5.1%)	5 / 99
Green Party	4,966 (4.2%)	▼2.4	0 (0.0%)	0 / 34	Steady	0 (0.0%)	0 / 99
Independent Conservative	1,346 (1.1%)	▲1.1	0 (0.0%)	0 / 34	▼1	0 (0.0%)	0 / 99
Independent	432 (0.4%)	Steady	0 (0.0%)	0 / 34	Steady	0 (0.0%)	0 / 99

↓
85	9	5

== Ward results ==
=== Ardwick ===
Ardwick
Party	Candidate	Votes	%	±%
Labour	N. I. Finley*	1,443	70.9	−7.8
Conservative	D. K. Lawrence	252	12.4	+3.6
Liberal Democrats	R. A. J. Axtell	235	11.5	+5.7
Green	P. E. Harrison	106	5.2	−1.5
Majority		1,191	58.5	−11.5
Turnout		2,036	25.5	
Labour hold		Swing	-5.7	

=== Baguley ===
Baguley
Party	Candidate	Votes	%	±%
Labour	W. Smith*	2,065	65.2	+2.0
Conservative	V. C. Kirby	1,100	34.8	+12.3
Majority		965	30.5	−10.2
Turnout		3,165	34.3	
Labour hold		Swing	-5.1	

=== Barlow Moor ===
Barlow Moor
Party	Candidate	Votes	%	±%
Liberal Democrats	S. A. Gluck*	1,799	45.9	+10.4
Labour	A. Harland	1,258	32.1	−10.2
Conservative	J. P. Baldwin	624	15.9	+0.1
Green	H. F. Bramwell	238	6.1	−0.3
Majority		541	13.8	+7.0
Turnout		3,919	38.0	
Liberal Democrats hold		Swing	+10.3	

=== Benchill ===
Benchill
Party	Candidate	Votes	%	±%
Labour	N. Warren*	1,714	71.8	−0.1
Liberal Democrats	A. Bradshaw	349	14.6	+7.8
Conservative	C. Roberts	323	13.5	+6.4
Majority		1,365	57.2	−3.7
Turnout		2,386	28.4	
Labour hold		Swing	-3.8	

=== Beswick and Clayton ===
Beswick and Clayton
Party	Candidate	Votes	%	±%
Labour	S. C. Silverman*	1,517	65.8	−13.8
Conservative	D. V. Russell	440	19.1	+8.7
Liberal Democrats	C. W. Turner	264	11.4	+4.9
Independent	F. Wolstencroft	86	3.7	+3.7
Majority		1,077	46.7	−22.5
Turnout		2,307	31.2	
Labour hold		Swing	-11.2	

=== Blackley ===
Blackley
Party	Candidate	Votes	%	±%
Labour	E. Kelly*	1,872	56.3	−10.4
Conservative	L. M. Brandolani	786	23.6	+2.5
Liberal Democrats	A. D. Kay	669	20.1	+13.1
Majority		1,086	32.6	−13.1
Turnout		3,327	36.3	
Labour hold		Swing	-6.4	

=== Bradford ===
Bradford
Party	Candidate	Votes	%	±%
Labour	M. S. Smith*	1,657	70.4	−7.7
Conservative	K. Hyde	366	15.5	+3.7
Liberal Democrats	J. R. Bridges	270	11.5	+4.8
Green	A. H. Kahan	61	2.6	−0.8
Majority		1,291	54.8	−11.5
Turnout		2,354	27.8	
Labour hold		Swing	-5.7	

=== Brooklands ===
Brooklands
Party	Candidate	Votes	%	±%
Conservative	M. B. Beaugeard	2,001	45.6	+7.1
Labour	A. S. Wood	1,799	41.0	−9.9
Liberal Democrats	S. A. Oliver	435	9.9	+2.8
Green	R. Clancy	156	3.6	0
Majority		202	4.6	−7.8
Turnout		4,391	45.4	
Conservative hold		Swing	+8.5	

=== Burnage ===
Burnage
Party	Candidate	Votes	%	±%
Labour	R. Boyle	1,968	46.5	−7.0
Conservative	J. Leach*	1,491	35.2	+6.2
Liberal Democrats	R. Harrison	611	14.4	+2.3
Green	J. Foster	166	3.9	−1.5
Majority		477	11.3	−13.2
Turnout		4,236	41.3	
Labour gain from Conservative		Swing	-6.6	

=== Central ===
Central
Party	Candidate	Votes	%	±%
Labour	P. Conquest*	1,286	72.3	−7.4
Liberal Democrats	K. H. Lambert	198	11.1	+5.9
Conservative	A. E. W. Hudson	195	11.0	+1.9
Green	P. J. Boast	100	5.6	−0.3
Majority		1,088	61.2	−9.4
Turnout		1,779	26.3	
Labour hold		Swing	-6.6	

=== Charlestown ===
Charlestown
Party	Candidate	Votes	%	±%
Labour	N. Tilley	1,835	55.3	−8.4
Conservative	F. D. Borg	898	27.0	+4.2
Liberal Democrats	J. Laslett	587	17.7	+9.7
Majority		937	28.2	−12.7
Turnout		3,320	35.0	
Labour hold		Swing	-6.3	

=== Cheetham ===
Cheetham
Party	Candidate	Votes	%	±%
Labour	N. Harris*	1,938	73.3	−8.2
Conservative	D. K. Shenoy	299	11.3	+11.3
Liberal Democrats	V. Towers	267	10.1	−8.4
Green	B. J. A. Doherty	139	5.3	+5.3
Majority		1,639	62.0	−0.9
Turnout		2,643	28.1	
Labour hold		Swing	-9.7	

=== Chorlton ===
Chorlton
Party	Candidate	Votes	%	±%
Labour	C. M. Rogers	2,187	39.8	−12.4
Labour	B. D. Selby	1,979		
Conservative	J. Bradshaw	1,829	33.3	+2.2
Conservative	W. I. Bradshaw	1,816		
Green	B. A. Candeland	751	13.7	+3.1
Liberal Democrats	H. D. McKay	723	13.2	+7.1
Liberal Democrats	J. Redmond	512		
Majority		150	6.5	−14.6
Turnout		5,490	48.3	
Labour gain from Conservative		Swing		
Labour hold		Swing	-7.3	

=== Crumpsall ===
Crumpsall
Party	Candidate	Votes	%	±%
Labour	V. Edwards	1,782	46.2	−4.7
Conservative	A. E. Walsh	1,474	38.2	+2.1
Liberal Democrats	D. I. Gordon	408	10.6	+4.7
Green	P. R. Lewis	190	4.9	−2.1
Majority		308	8.0	−6.8
Turnout		3,854	41.7	
Labour gain from Conservative		Swing	-3.4	

=== Didsbury ===
Didsbury
Party	Candidate	Votes	%	±%
Conservative	W. H. Aikman	3,003	51.5	+4.5
Labour	G. Bridson	1,893	32.4	−6.6
Liberal Democrats	E. Allen	692	11.9	+3.5
Green	R. W. Goater	248	4.2	−1.3
Majority		1,110	19.0	+11.0
Turnout		5,836	52.0	
Conservative hold		Swing	+5.5	

=== Fallowfield ===
Fallowfield
Party	Candidate	Votes	%	±%
Labour	R. N. Y. Khan	1,624	50.9	−7.5
Conservative	D. Smith	890	27.9	+8.0
Liberal Democrats	B. Jones	399	12.5	+3.3
Green	M. J. Daw	278	8.7	−3.8
Majority		734	23.0	−15.5
Turnout		3,191	29.1	
Labour hold		Swing	-7.7	

=== Gorton North ===
Gorton North
Party	Candidate	Votes	%	±%
Liberal Democrats	J. Pearcey	2,619	53.0	+11.2
Labour	A. Unwin*	1,621	32.8	−9.0
Independent	T. Mooney	346	7.0	+7.0
Conservative	A. Bourne	305	6.2	−0.6
Green	M. R. Shaw	49	1.0	−1.5
Majority		998	20.2	+13.1
Turnout		4,940	45.9	
Liberal Democrats gain from Labour		Swing	+10.1	

=== Gorton South ===
Gorton South
Party	Candidate	Votes	%	±%
Liberal Democrats	J. Ashley*	2,125	52.7	+19.4
Labour	B. Whitehead	1,606	39.8	−14.3
Conservative	D. Jones	212	5.3	−3.3
Green	T. E. Romagnuolo	88	2.2	−1.8
Majority		519	12.9	−7.8
Turnout		4,031	40.9	
Liberal Democrats hold		Swing	+16.8	

=== Harpurhey ===
Harpurhey
Party	Candidate	Votes	%	±%
Labour	N. Siddiqi*	1,546	58.3	−11.5
Conservative	D. H. Keller	574	21.6	+4.9
Liberal Democrats	N. Towers	405	15.3	+6.6
Green	S. S. Fitzgibbon	128	4.8	0
Majority		972	36.6	−16.6
Turnout		2,653	31.1	
Labour hold		Swing	-8.2	

=== Hulme ===
Hulme
Party	Candidate	Votes	%	±%
Labour	P. R. Dungey	1,183	68.3	−4.1
Green	V. Greenfield	225	13.0	−2.6
Conservative	A. Pollitt	170	9.8	+3.0
Liberal Democrats	D. P. Rudge	155	8.9	+3.7
Majority		958	55.3	−1.5
Turnout		1,733	25.5	
Labour hold		Swing	-0.7	

=== Levenshulme ===
Levenshulme
Party	Candidate	Votes	%	±%
Liberal Democrats	M. T. Rowles	2,911	61.6	+6.6
Labour	H. Smith	1,235	26.1	−7.7
Conservative	A. Malpas	366	7.7	+2.2
Green	P. N. Thompson	211	4.5	−1.2
Majority		1,676	35.5	+14.3
Turnout		4,723	46.2	
Liberal Democrats gain from Liberal		Swing	-7.1	

=== Lightbowne ===
Lightbowne
Party	Candidate	Votes	%	±%
Labour	C. M. Inchbold*	2,081	54.3	−11.1
Conservative	M. P. Steadman	1,054	27.5	+8.9
Liberal Democrats	P. G. Matthews	700	18.3	+7.4
Majority		1,027	26.8	−20.0
Turnout		3,835	39.9	
Labour hold		Swing	-10.0	

=== Longsight ===
Longsight
Party	Candidate	Votes	%	±%
Labour	K. S. Strath*	2,107	52.1	−12.1
Conservative	M. Naqui	1,013	25.4	+10.7
Green	J. E. Denham	453	11.3	−3.1
Liberal Democrats	B. I. Pierce	421	10.5	+3.9
Majority		1,094	27.4	−22.1
Turnout		3,994	35.5	
Labour hold		Swing	-11.4	

=== Moss Side ===
Moss Side
Party	Candidate	Votes	%	±%
Labour	C. M. M. Nangle	2,382	82.8	+8.9
Conservative	M. G. Barnes	274	9.5	0
Liberal Democrats	I. C. Donaldson	220	7.6	+1.6
Majority		2,108	73.3	+8.9
Turnout		2,876	30.4	
Labour hold		Swing	+4.4	

=== Moston ===
Moston
Party	Candidate	Votes	%	±%
Labour	H. Cooper	2,167	49.9	−7.1
Conservative	F. Frost	1,549	35.7	+3.9
Liberal Democrats	E. L. B. Slater	624	14.4	+7.0
Majority		618	14.2	−11.0
Turnout		4,340	43.9	
Labour gain from Conservative		Swing	-5.5	

=== Newton Heath ===
Newton Heath
Party	Candidate	Votes	%	±%
Labour	D. Rathbone	1,820	64.0	−13.0
Conservative	R. Caddick	559	19.6	+6.9
Liberal Democrats	K. W. Wadsworth	353	12.4	+6.6
Green	S. Boulton	113	4.0	−0.5
Majority		1,261	44.3	−20.0
Turnout		2,845	30.2	
Labour hold		Swing	-9.9	

=== Northenden ===
Northenden
Party	Candidate	Votes	%	±%
Labour	Mike Kane	2,233	47.7	−8.0
Ind. Conservative	A. A. Carroll*	1,346	28.8	+28.8
Conservative	G. Parry	701	15.0	−18.6
Liberal Democrats	J. P. Spurway	301	6.4	−0.3
Green	G. Otten	96	2.1	−1.8
Majority		887	19.0	−3.1
Turnout		4,677	47.8	
Labour gain from Ind. Conservative		Swing	-18.4	

=== Old Moat ===
Old Moat
Party	Candidate	Votes	%	±%
Labour	A. J. Spencer*	2,158	48.7	−7.6
Conservative	G. H. Betton	1,360	30.7	+7.6
Liberal Democrats	M. J. Sowemimo	651	14.7	+3.3
Green	J. G. Booty	260	5.9	−3.2
Majority		798	18.0	−15.2
Turnout		4,429	40.8	
Labour hold		Swing	-7.6	

=== Rusholme ===
Rusholme
Party	Candidate	Votes	%	±%
Labour	M. Manning	1,848	53.3	−11.4
Liberal Democrats	C. F. L. McGrath	742	21.4	+1.8
Conservative	R. S. Norris	460	13.3	+13.3
Green	B. S. Bingham	418	12.1	−3.6
Majority		1,106	31.9	−13.1
Turnout		3,468	35.9	
Labour gain from Liberal Democrats		Swing	-6.6	

=== Sharston ===
Sharston
Party	Candidate	Votes	%	±%
Labour	J. E. Keller	1,746	54.2	+0.1
Conservative	T. J. Roberts	819	25.4	+5.3
Liberal Democrats	I. G. Davies	472	14.6	+1.8
Green	G. A. Lawson	186	5.8	−7.1
Majority		927	28.8	−5.2
Turnout		3,223	35.7	
Labour hold		Swing	-2.6	

=== Whalley Range ===
Whalley Range
Party	Candidate	Votes	%	±%
Labour	H. Johnson	2,058	49.2	−4.9
Conservative	J. Kershaw*	1,731	41.3	+9.1
Liberal Democrats	S. C. Ashley	398	9.5	+3.2
Majority		327	7.8	−14.1
Turnout		4,187	45.2	
Labour gain from Conservative		Swing	-7.0	

=== Withington ===
Withington
Party	Candidate	Votes	%	±%
Liberal Democrats	D. J. Sandiford*	2,001	42.3	−1.1
Labour	G. Betney	1,606	33.9	−2.6
Conservative	P. W. Davies	823	17.4	+3.4
Green	B. J. Ekbery	306	6.5	+0.3
Majority		395	8.3	+1.4
Turnout		4,736	44.8	
Liberal Democrats hold		Swing	+0.7	

=== Woodhouse Park ===
Woodhouse Park
Party	Candidate	Votes	%	±%
Labour	M. Bullows*	1,909	73.7	−0.9
Conservative	L. Maguire	681	26.3	+26.3
Majority		1,228	47.4	−9.7
Turnout		2,590	29.8	
Labour hold		Swing	-13.6	
