= Bill Egerton =

British politician (1944–2019)

William Terence Egerton JP (1944-12 September 2019) was a politician in Manchester, England.

He was Leader of Manchester City Council between 1982 and 1984, and served as Lord Mayor in 1992/3. He has also been Chairman of North Manchester NHS Healthcare Trust and held a wide variety of other official positions.

He was first elected as Councillor for the St Luke's Ward in May 1970 and then for the Bradford Ward and Beswick and Clayton Ward until May 1994. He was then elected as Councillor for the City Centre Ward in 1999 and served until 2003. The Manchester Labour group announced on their Twitter account that Bill Egerton died on 12 September 2019, following a sudden heart attack.

Political offices
Preceded by Norman Morris	Leader of Manchester City Council; 1982–1984	Succeeded by Graham Stringer
Honorary titles
Preceded by George Chadwick	Lord Mayor of Manchester; 1992–1993	Succeeded by William T Risby
