= Charles Dreyfus =

French-born British Zionist activist

Charles Dreyfus (1848, Alsace – 11 December 1935, Menton) was a French-born British Zionist activist and the President of the Manchester Zionist Society, a member of Manchester City Council and a leading figure in the East Manchester Conservative Association during the time that Arthur Balfour was Member of Parliament for the constituency and Prime Minister. In 1876 Dreyfus founded the Clayton Aniline Company and was Elected to membership of the Manchester Literary and Philosophical Society on 8 January 1885

== Biography ==
Dreyfus studied chemistry in Strasbourg. He emigrated to Manchester in 1869, where he established the Clayton Aniline Company in 1876. As a councillor he led the campaign for a Jewish hospital.

At Dreyfus' suggestion Balfour and the Zionist leader Chaim Weizmann (later first President of the State of Israel) first met at a constituency meeting on 27 January 1905. Dreyfus had been introduced to Weizmann by the Zionist activist and writer Joseph Massel. Dreyfus was Weizmann's employer in Manchester and remained a friend until his death.

Charles Dreyfus was a distant relative of Alfred Dreyfus, the young Jewish artillery officer at the centre of the notorious French political scandal, the Dreyfus affair.
