= Levenshulme (ward) =

- Ward
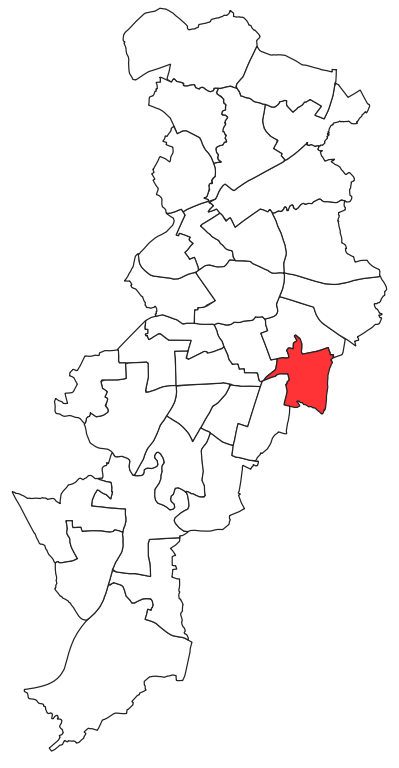
- Levenshulme ward (2018) within Manchester

- Coat of arms
- Country: United Kingdom
- Constituent country: England
- Region: North West England
- County: Greater Manchester
- Metropolitan borough: Manchester
- Created: November 1919
- Named for: Levenshulme

Government
  - Type: Unicameral
  - Body: Manchester City Council
- UK Parliamentary Constituency: Gorton and Denton

Levenshulme is an electoral division of Manchester City Council which has been represented since 1919. It covers the South Manchester suburb of Levenshulme.

== Overview ==
Levenshulme ward was created in 1919, from the area of the former Levenshulme North and Levenshulme South wards. The ward was unaffected by city-wide boundary revisions in 1950, however, further revisions in 1971, transferred a part of the Gorton South ward near Crowcroft Park to the ward. In 1982, a large section of the north of the ward was transferred to the Gorton South ward. In 2004, the ward's western boundary was extended to Wilmslow Road. At the latest revision in 2018, that part of the former Gorton South ward to the south of the Nico Ditch was transferred to the ward, while that part of the ward to the west of the Styal Line was transferred to the Fallowfield ward.

From its creation until 1950, the ward formed part of the Manchester Rusholme Parliamentary constituency. From 1950 until 1955, it was part of the Manchester Gorton Parliamentary constituency. From 1955 until 1974, it was part of the Manchester Withington Parliamentary constituency. From 1974 until 1983, it was part of the Manchester Ardwick Parliamentary constituency. In 1983, it returned to the Manchester Gorton Parliamentary constituency. Since 2024, it has formed part of the Gorton and Denton Parliamentary constituency.

== Councillors ==
Election	Councillor	Councillor	Councillor
1919	M. E. Mitchell (Lib)	R. S. Harper (Lib)	J. Harrison (Ind)
1920	M. E. Mitchell (Lib)	R. S. Harper (Lib)	J. Harrison (Ind)
1921	M. E. Mitchell (Lib)	R. S. Harper (Ind)	J. Harrison (Ind)
1922	M. E. Mitchell (Lib)	R. S. Harper (Ind)	J. Harrison (Ind)
1923	M. E. Mitchell (Lib)	R. S. Harper (Ind)	J. Harrison (Ind)
1924	M. E. Mitchell (Lib)	R. S. Harper (Ind)	J. Harrison (Ind)
1925	M. E. Mitchell (Lib)	R. S. Harper (Ind)	J. Harrison (Ind)
1926	M. E. Mitchell (Lib)	R. S. Harper (Con)	J. Harrison (Ind)
July 1927	C. R. de la Wyche (Lib)	R. S. Harper (Con)	J. Harrison (Ind)
1927	C. R. de la Wyche (Lib)	R. S. Harper (Con)	J. Harrison (Ind
May 1928	C. R. de la Wyche (Lib)	R. S. Harper (Con)	H. M. Emery (Con)
June 1928	C. R. de la Wyche (Lib)	S. R. Fairfoull (Con)	H. M. Emery (Con)
1928	C. R. de la Wyche (Lib)	S. R. Fairfoull (Con)	H. M. Emery (Con)
1929	C. R. de la Wyche (Lib)	S. R. Fairfoull (Con)	H. M. Emery (Con)
1930	C. R. de la Wyche (Lib)	S. R. Fairfoull (Con)	H. M. Emery (Con)
1931	C. R. de la Wyche (Lib)	S. R. Fairfoull (Con)	H. M. Emery (Con)
1932	C. R. de la Wyche (Lib)	S. R. Fairfoull (Con)	H. M. Emery (Con)
1933	C. R. de la Wyche (Lib)	S. R. Fairfoull (Con)	H. M. Emery (Con)
1934	C. R. de la Wyche (Lib)	S. R. Fairfoull (Con)	H. M. Emery (Con)
1935	C. R. de la Wyche (Lib)	S. R. Fairfoull (Con)	H. M. Emery (Con)
1936	C. R. de la Wyche (Lib)	S. R. Fairfoull (Con)	H. M. Emery (Con)
1937	C. R. de la Wyche (Lib)	S. R. Fairfoull (Con)	H. M. Emery (Con)
1938	C. R. de la Wyche (Lib)	S. R. Fairfoull (Con)	H. M. Emery (Con)
1945	C. R. de la Wyche (Lib)	J. Bowes (Con)	O. Lodge (Con)
1946	R. A. Fieldhouse (Con)	J. Bowes (Con)	O. Lodge (Con)
1947	R. A. Fieldhouse (Con)	J. Bowes (Con)	O. Lodge (Con)
1949	R. A. Fieldhouse (Con)	J. Bowes (Con)	O. Lodge (Con)
1950	R. A. Fieldhouse (Con)	J. Bowes (Con)	O. Lodge (Con)
1951	R. A. Fieldhouse (Con)	J. Bowes (Con)	O. Lodge (Con)
1952	R. A. Fieldhouse (Con)	J. Bowes (Con)	O. Lodge (Con)
1953	R. A. Fieldhouse (Con)	J. Bowes (Con)	O. Lodge (Con)
1954	R. A. Fieldhouse (Con)	J. Bowes (Con)	O. Lodge (Con)
1955	R. A. Fieldhouse (Con)	J. Bowes (Con)	O. Lodge (Con)
1956	R. A. Fieldhouse (Con)	J. Bowes (Con)	O. Lodge (Con)
1957	R. A. Fieldhouse (Con)	J. Bowes (Con)	O. Lodge (Con)
1958	R. A. Fieldhouse (Con)	J. Bowes (Con)	O. Lodge (Con)
1959	R. A. Fieldhouse (Con)	J. Bowes (Con)	O. Lodge (Con)
1960	R. A. Fieldhouse (Con)	J. Bowes (Con)	O. Lodge (Con)
1961	R. A. Fieldhouse (Con)	J. Bowes (Con)	O. Lodge (Con)
1962	R. A. Fieldhouse (Con)	J. Bowes (Con)	O. Lodge (Con)
1963	R. A. Fieldhouse (Con)	J. Bowes (Con)	O. Lodge (Con)
1964	R. A. Fieldhouse (Con)	A. Williamson (Con)	O. Lodge (Con)
1965	R. A. Fieldhouse (Con)	A. Williamson (Con)	O. Lodge (Con)
September 1965	R. A. Fieldhouse (Con)	A. Williamson (Con)	C. S. Robb (Con)
1966	R. A. Fieldhouse (Con)	A. Williamson (Con)	C. S. Robb (Con)
June 1966	J. K. Barber (Con)	A. Williamson (Con)	C. S. Robb (Con)
1967	J. K. Barber (Con)	A. Williamson (Con)	C. S. Robb (Con)
1968	J. K. Barber (Con)	A. Williamson (Con)	C. S. Robb (Con)
1969	J. K. Barber (Con)	A. Williamson (Con)	C. S. Robb (Con)
1970	J. K. Barber (Con)	A. Williamson (Con)	C. S. Robb (Con)
1971	C. Brierley (Lab)	N. I. Finley (Lab)	A. E. Jones (Lab)
1972	C. Brierley (Lab)	N. I. Finley (Lab)	J. K. Barber (Con)
1973	J. K. Barber (Con)	W. Carlton (Con)	S. D. Alexander (Con)
1975	J. K. Barber (Con)	W. Carlton (Con)	S. D. Alexander (Con)
1976	J. K. Barber (Con)	W. Carlton (Con)	S. D. Alexander (Con)
1978	J. K. Barber (Con)	W. Carlton (Con)	S. D. Alexander (Con)
1979	J. K. Barber (Con)	W. Carlton (Con)	K. Whitmore (Lib)
1980	J. K. Barber (Con)	H. Smith (Lib)	K. Whitmore (Lib)
1982	K. Whitmore (Lib)	J. Blessing (Lib)	H. Smith (Lib)
1983	K. Whitmore (Lib)	J. Blessing (Lib)	A. Greaves (Lib)
1984	K. Whitmore (Lib)	J. Blessing (Lib)	A. Greaves (Lib)
1986	K. Whitmore (Lib)	J. Blessing (Lib)	A. Greaves (Lib)
1987	K. Whitmore (Lib)	J. Blessing (Lib)	A. Greaves (Lib)
1988	K. Whitmore (SLD)	J. Commons (SLD)	A. Greaves (Lib)
1990	K. Whitmore (Lib Dem)	J. Commons (Lib Dem)	A. Greaves (Lib)
1991	K. Whitmore (Lib Dem)	J. Commons (Lib Dem)	M. T. Rowles (Lib Dem)
1992	K. Whitmore (Lib Dem)	J. Commons (Lib Dem)	M. T. Rowles (Lib Dem)
1994	K. Whitmore (Lib Dem)	J. Commons (Lib Dem)	M. T. Rowles (Lib Dem)
1995	K. Whitmore (Lib Dem)	J. Commons (Lib Dem)	M. T. Rowles (Lib Dem)
1996	K. Whitmore (Lib Dem)	J. Commons (Lib Dem)	M. T. Rowles (Lib Dem)
1998	K. Whitmore (Lib Dem)	J. Commons (Lib Dem)	M. T. Rowles (Lib Dem)
1999	K. Whitmore (Lib Dem)	J. Commons (Lib Dem)	D. Hennigan (Lib Dem)
2000	K. Whitmore (Lib Dem)	J. Commons (Lib Dem)	D. Hennigan (Lib Dem)
2002	K. Whitmore (Lib Dem)	J. Commons (Lib Dem)	D. Hennigan (Lib Dem)
2003	K. Whitmore (Lib Dem)	J. Commons (Lib Dem)	D. Hennigan (Lib Dem)
2004	Keith Whitmore (Lib Dem)	John Commons (Lib Dem)	Alexander Cowan (Lib Dem)
2006	Keith Whitmore (Lib Dem)	John Commons (Lib Dem)	Alexander Cowan (Lib Dem)
2007	Keith Whitmore (Lib Dem)	John Commons (Lib Dem)	Alexander Cowan (Lib Dem)
2008	Keith Whitmore (Lib Dem)	John Commons (Lib Dem)	Alexander Cowan (Lib Dem)
2010	Keith Whitmore (Lib Dem)	John Commons (Lib Dem)	James Hennigan (Lib Dem)
2011	Keith Whitmore (Lib Dem)	Aftab Ahmed (Lab)	James Hennigan (Lib Dem)
2012	Nasrin Ali (Lab)	Aftab Ahmed (Lab)	James Hennigan (Lib Dem)
2014	Nasrin Ali (Lab)	Aftab Ahmed (Lab)	Dzidra Noor (Lab)
2015	Nasrin Ali (Lab)	Basat Sheikh (Lab)	Dzidra Noor (Lab)
2016	Nasrin Ali (Lab)	Basat Sheikh (Lab)	Dzidra Noor (Lab)
2018	Dzidra Noor (Lab)	Bernard Stone (Lab)	Basat Sheikh (Lab)
2019	Dzidra Noor (Lab)	Bernard Stone (Lab)	Basat Sheikh (Lab)
2021	Dzidra Noor (Lab)	Zahid Hussain (Lab)	Basat Sheikh (Lab)
2022	Dzidra Noor (Lab)	Zahid Hussain (Lab)	Basat Sheikh (Lab)
2023	Dzidra Noor (Lab)	Zahid Hussain (Lab)	Basat Sheikh (Lab)
2024	Dzidra Noor (Lab)	Zahid Hussain (Lab)	Basat Sheikh (Lab)
2026	Fesl Reza-Khan (Grn)	Zahid Hussain (Lab)	Basat Sheikh (Lab)

== Elections ==
=== Elections in 2020s ===
==== May 2026 ====
2026
Party	Candidate	Votes	%	±%
Green	Fesl Reza-Khan	3,073	55.5	+42.3
Labour	Dzidra Noor*	1,052	19.0	−45.0
Workers Party	Muhammad Iqbal	649	11.7	N/A
Reform	Christian Sky	378	6.8	N/A
Independent	Jeremy Hoad	286	5.2	−7.2
Liberal Democrats	Liaquat Ali	68	1.2	−4.3
TUSC	Emma Woods	33	0.6	N/A
Majority		2,021	36.5	N/A
Turnout		5,539	38.1	+8.0
Green gain from Labour		Swing		

==== May 2024 ====
2024
Party	Candidate	Votes	%	±%
Labour	Zahid Hussain*	1,958	37.8	28.5 ▼
Workers Party	Muhammad Iqbal	1,200	23.2	New
Green	Amanda Gardner	863	16.7	4.0 ▲
Independent	Jeremy Edward Hoad	761	14.7	3.3 ▲
Liberal Democrats	John Bridges	224	4.3	0.9 ▼
Conservative	Chan Ben Kin	120	2.3	20 ▼
Majority		758	14.6	
Rejected ballots		57	1.1	
Turnout		5,183	37.30	
Registered electors		13,895		
Labour hold		Swing	25.8 ▼	

==== May 2023 ====
2023
Party	Candidate	Votes	%	±%
Labour	Basat Sheikh*	2,425	59.5	4.7 ▼
Green	Amanda Gardner	762	18.7	0.2 ▲
Independent	Jeremy Hoad	484	11.9	N/A
Liberal Democrats	John Bridges	265	6.5	6.8 ▼
Conservative	Patience Assam	108	2.6	1.8 ▼
Northern Heart	Alim Haider	34	0.8	N/A
Majority		1,663		
Rejected ballots		24		
Turnout		4,078	30.9	
Registered electors		13,284		
Labour hold		Swing		

==== May 2022 ====
2022
Party	Candidate	Votes	%	±%
Labour	Dzidra Noor*	2,543	64.0	7.9 ▼
Green	Brian Candeland	525	13.2	5.3 ▼
Independent	Jeremy Hoad	492	12.4	n/a
Liberal Democrats	Greg Sammons	217	5.5	7.7 ▼
Conservative	Jason McLeod	175	4.4	Steady
Majority		2,018	50.8	
Rejected ballots		23		
Turnout		3,975	30.1	3.9 ▼
Registered electors		13,206		
Labour hold		Swing	1.3 ▼	

==== May 2021 ====
2021
Party	Candidate	Votes	%	±%
Labour	Zareen Hussain	3,136	66.3	11.6 ▼
Green	Dick Venes	599	12.7	5.8 ▲
Independent	Jeremy Hoad	540	11.4	New
Liberal Democrats	Greg Sammons	248	5.2	4.7 ▼
Conservative	Alexandru Stancu	205	4.3	0.5 ▲
Majority		2,537	53.6	
Rejected ballots		46	1.0	
Turnout		4,774	36.4	2.4 ▲
Registered electors		13,125		
Labour hold		Swing	9.7 ▼	

=== Elections in 2010s ===
==== May 2019 ====
2019
Party	Candidate	Votes	%	±%
Labour	Basat Mahmood Sheikh*	2,524	65.9	▲0.8
Green	Dick Venes	604	15.8	▼2.7
Liberal Democrats	Andrew Hickey	370	9.7	▲0.9
UKIP	Bob Catterall	218	5.7	▲1.9
Conservative	James Smith	88	2.3	▼1.0
Majority		1,920	50.2	▲3.6
Rejected ballots		24	0.63	
Turnout		3,828	31.02	▼2.9
Registered electors		12,344		
Labour hold		Swing	▲1.75	

==== May 2018 ====
2018 (3 vacancies; new boundaries)
Party	Candidate	Votes	%	±%
Labour	Dzidra Noor*	3,031	71.9	
Labour	Bernard Stone*	2,995	71.1	
Labour	Basat Sheikh*	2,745	65.1	
Green	Ieuan Hall	779	18.5	
Liberal Democrats	Charles Glover	558	13.2	
Liberal Democrats	Mark Saunders	319	7.6	
Liberal Democrats	Nicholas Saunders	239	5.7	
Conservative	Lawrence Rosenberg	187	4.4	
UKIP	Bob Catterall	161	3.8	
Conservative	James Smith	138	3.3	
Conservative	Elisheva Walker	106	2.5	
Majority				
Turnout		4,213	34	
Labour win (new boundaries)				
Labour win (new boundaries)				
Labour win (new boundaries)				

==== May 2016 ====
2016
Party	Candidate	Votes	%	±%
Labour	Nasrin Bibi Ali*	2,066	54.5	+4.2
Green	Dick Venes	764	20.2	+0.5
Independent	Mark Breeze	470	12.4	n/a
Liberal Democrats	Liaqat Ali	285	7.5	−20.4
Conservative	Calum Tudur James Davies	164	4.3	+2.2
TUSC	Joe McArdle	40	1.1	n/a
Majority		1,302	34.4	
Turnout		3,789	35.2	
Labour hold		Swing		

==== May 2015 ====
2015
Party	Candidate	Votes	%	±%
Labour	Basat Mahmood Sheikh	3,194	49.1	−3.1
Liberal Democrats	John Patrick Bryans Commons	1,298	20.0	−8.4
Green	Dick Venes	1,290	19.9	+5.1
Conservative	Khawar Iqbal	515	7.9	+3.3
TUSC	Fiona Penelope Higgins	202	3.1	N/A
Majority		1,896	29.1	
Turnout		6,499	60.7	+22.8
Labour hold		Swing		

==== May 2014 ====
2014
Party	Candidate	Votes	%	±%
Labour	Dzidra Noor	1,885	43.83	
Liberal Democrats	James Hennigan*	1,551	36.06	
Green	Dick Venes	718	16.69	
Conservative	Shaden Jaradat	147	3.42	
Majority		334	7.8	
Turnout		4,301	38.4	
Labour gain from Liberal Democrats		Swing		

==== May 2012 ====
2012
Party	Candidate	Votes	%	±%
Labour	Nasrin Ali	1,722	50.3	+24.3
Liberal Democrats	John Commons	955	27.9	−27.8
Green	David Mottram	674	19.7	+7.8
Conservative	Ryan El-Idrissi	73	2.1	−9.8
Majority		767	22	
Turnout		3,424	30.6	
Labour gain from Liberal Democrats		Swing		

==== May 2011 ====
2011
Party	Candidate	Votes	%	±%
Labour	Aftab Ahmed	2,210	52.2	+24.8
Liberal Democrats	John Commons*	1,204	28.4	−22.8
Green	David Mottram	627	14.8	+2.5
Conservative	Ryan El-Idrissi	194	4.6	−4.5
Majority		1,006	23.8	
Turnout		4,235	37.9	
Labour gain from Liberal Democrats		Swing		

==== May 2010 ====
2010
Party	Candidate	Votes	%	±%
Liberal Democrats	James Hennigan	2,546	41.7	−14.0
Labour	Aftab Ahmed	2,340	38.3	+12.3
Green	David William Mottram	664	10.9	−1.0
Conservative	Rob Manning	556	9.1	+2.7
Majority		206	3.4	−26.3
Turnout		6,106	56.7	+30.0
Liberal Democrats hold		Swing	-13.1	

=== Elections in 2000s ===
==== May 2008 ====
2008
Party	Candidate	Votes	%	±%
Liberal Democrats	Keith Whitmore*	1,530	55.7	+4.5
Labour	Quammer Ahmad	715	26.0	−1.4
Green	Justine Hall	327	11.9	−0.4
Conservative	Abbas Khurshid	175	6.4	−2.7
Majority		815	29.7	+5.9
Turnout		2,747	26.7	−0.3
Liberal Democrats hold		Swing	+2.9	

==== May 2007 ====
2007
Party	Candidate	Votes	%	±%
Liberal Democrats	John Commons*	1,388	51.2	+1.1
Labour	Dermot Zafar	742	27.4	−0.5
Green	Peter Thompson	334	12.3	−2.0
Conservative	Anne Carroll	248	9.1	+1.3
Majority		646	23.8	+1.5
Turnout		2,712	27.0	−1.4
Liberal Democrats hold		Swing	+0.8	

==== May 2006 ====
2006
Party	Candidate	Votes	%	±%
Liberal Democrats	Alexander Cowan*	1,402	50.1	−3.1
Labour	Dermot Sean Zafar	779	27.9	+3.8
Green	Peter Norman Thompson	399	14.3	−2.1
Conservative	William Moore	217	7.8	+1.5
Majority		623	22.3	−6.9
Turnout		2,797	28.4	−4.1
Liberal Democrats hold		Swing	-3.4	

==== June 2004 ====
2004 (3 vacancies; new boundaries)
Party	Candidate	Votes	%	±%
Liberal Democrats	Keith Whitmore*	2,026	57.5	
Liberal Democrats	John Commons*	1,906	54.1	
Liberal Democrats	Alexander Cowan	1,865	52.9	
Labour	Patrick McGuinness	918	26.1	
Green	Peter Thompson	623	17.7	
Labour	Patrick Perry	608	17.3	
Labour	Nicholas Macgregor	524	14.9	
Conservative	Julie Gilbody	239	6.8	
Conservative	David Gilbody	227	6.4	
Conservative	William Moore	225	6.4	
Majority		947	26.9	
Turnout		3,523	32.5	
Liberal Democrats win (new seat)				
Liberal Democrats win (new seat)				
Liberal Democrats win (new seat)				

==== May 2003 ====
2003
Party	Candidate	Votes	%	±%
Liberal Democrats	David Hennigan*	1,625	60.8	+5.8
Labour	Michael Amesbury	667	25.0	−5.4
Green	Sean Hughes	153	5.7	−0.1
Conservative	Ann Hodkinson	128	4.8	+0.6
Socialist Alliance	Sabrina Nutter	100	3.7	−0.9
Majority		958	35.8	+11.2
Turnout		2,673	26.1	−1.1
Liberal Democrats hold		Swing	+5.6	

==== May 2002 ====
2002
Party	Candidate	Votes	%	±%
Liberal Democrats	Keith Whitmore*	1,557	55.0	−3.6
Labour	Michael Amesbury	861	30.4	+1.8
Green	Michael Brennan	163	5.8	+0.1
Socialist Alliance	Sabrina Nutter	130	4.6	+4.6
Conservative	Raymond Wattenbach	118	4.2	−2.0
Majority		696	24.6	−5.4
Turnout		2,829	27.2	+2.3
Liberal Democrats hold		Swing	-2.7	

==== May 2000 ====
2000
Party	Candidate	Votes	%	±%
Liberal Democrats	John Commons*	1,419	58.6	+1.4
Labour	Nicholas Macgregor	693	28.6	−2.0
Conservative	Richard West	150	6.2	+2.5
Green	Philip Maile	139	5.7	+2.7
Communist League	Paul Galloway	22	0.9	+0.9
Majority		726	30.0	+3.3
Turnout		2,423	24.9	−1.0
Liberal Democrats hold		Swing	+1.7	

=== Elections in 1990s ===
==== May 1999 ====
1999
Party	Candidate	Votes	%	±%
Liberal Democrats	David Hennigan	1,504	57.2	−0.5
Labour	Nicholas Macgregor	803	30.6	+1.9
Independent	John Howard	125	4.8	+4.8
Conservative	Paul Kierman	98	3.7	−1.8
Green	Michael Daw	79	3.0	0
Communist League	Paul Galloway	19	0.7	+0.7
Majority		701	26.7	−2.3
Turnout		2,628	25.9	
Liberal Democrats hold		Swing	-1.2	

==== May 1998 ====
1998
Party	Candidate	Votes	%	±%
Liberal Democrats	Keith Whitmore*	1,550	57.7	+0.5
Labour	Nicholas Macgregor	771	28.7	−5.7
Conservative	Paul Davies	148	5.5	+1.2
Socialist Labour	John Garratt	104	3.9	+3.9
Green	Simon Chislett	81	3.0	−0.2
Socialist	Andrew Pitts	32	1.2	+1.2
Majority		779	29.0	+6.3
Turnout		2,686		
Liberal Democrats hold		Swing	+3.1	

==== May 1996 ====
1996
Party	Candidate	Votes	%	±%
Liberal Democrats	John Commons*	1,908	57.2	−0.7
Labour	Zafar Mir	1,149	34.4	−0.5
Conservative	Paul Mostyn	142	4.3	+0.5
Green	A. Mohamood	107	3.2	+3.2
Communist League	A. Howie	32	1.0	+1.0
Majority		759	22.7	−0.3
Turnout		3,338		
Liberal Democrats hold		Swing	-0.1	

==== May 1995 ====
1995
Party	Candidate	Votes	%	±%
Liberal Democrats	Maria Rowles*	2,050	57.9	−3.3
Labour	Christopher Lowe	1,236	34.9	+4.4
Conservative	S. Peel	135	3.8	−0.7
Independent	K. Harkavy	87	2.5	+2.5
Natural Law	P. Mitchell	19	0.5	+0.5
Independent	D. Delange	16	0.5	+0.5
Majority		814	23.0	−7.7
Turnout		3,543		
Liberal Democrats hold		Swing	-3.8	

==== May 1994 ====
1994
Party	Candidate	Votes	%	±%
Liberal Democrats	Keith Whitmore*	2,529	61.2	+4.6
Labour	H. Pare	1,261	30.5	+3.0
Conservative	R. West	188	4.5	−6.5
Green	P. Thompson	154	3.7	−1.3
Majority		1,268	30.7	+1.7
Turnout		4,132		
Liberal Democrats hold		Swing	+0.8	

==== May 1992 ====
1992
Party	Candidate	Votes	%	±%
Liberal Democrats	J. Commons*	2,105	56.6	−5.0
Labour	J. Brown	1,024	27.5	+1.4
Conservative	A. Soane	408	11.0	+3.3
Green	L. Crookes	185	5.0	+0.5
Majority		1,081	29.0	−6.5
Turnout		3,722		
Liberal Democrats hold		Swing	-3.2	

==== May 1991 ====
1991
Party	Candidate	Votes	%	±%
Liberal Democrats	M. T. Rowles	2,911	61.6	+6.6
Labour	H. Smith	1,235	26.1	−7.7
Conservative	A. Malpas	366	7.7	+2.2
Green	P. N. Thompson	211	4.5	−1.2
Majority		1,676	35.5	+14.3
Turnout		4,723	46.2	
Liberal Democrats gain from Liberal		Swing	-7.1	

==== May 1990 ====
1990
Party	Candidate	Votes	%	±%
Liberal Democrats	Keith Whitmore*	2,918	55.0	+13.8
Labour	C. M. R. Rogers	1,794	33.8	−3.0
Green	P. N. Thompson	303	5.7	+2.2
Conservative	R. Colledge	293	5.5	−13.1
Majority		1,124	21.2	+16.8
Turnout		5,308		
Liberal Democrats hold		Swing	+8.4	

=== Elections in 1980s ===
==== May 1988 ====
1988
Party	Candidate	Votes	%	±%
SLD	J. Commons	2,038	41.2	−14.2
Labour	D. J. Power	1,821	36.8	+9.3
Conservative	R. Colledge	919	18.6	+4.8
Green	A. R. King	172	3.5	+0.2
Majority		217	4.4	−23.5
Turnout		4,950		
SLD hold		Swing	-11.7	

==== May 1987 ====
1987
Party	Candidate	Votes	%	±%
Liberal	Audrey Greaves*	2,974	55.4	+2.1
Labour	Vincent Young	1,474	27.5	−4.3
Conservative	Victoria Colledge	741	13.8	+1.3
Green	Beryl Clarke	178	3.3	+1.0
Majority		1,500	27.9	+6.5
Turnout		5,367		
Liberal hold		Swing	+3.2	

==== May 1986 ====
1986
Party	Candidate	Votes	%	±%
Liberal	Keith Whitmore*	2,637	53.3	+7.2
Labour	G. Sharpe	1,576	31.8	−4.5
Conservative	V. Colledge	621	12.5	−5.1
Green	C. Shearman	116	2.3	+2.3
Majority		1,061	21.4	+11.7
Turnout		4,950		
Liberal hold		Swing	+5.8	

==== May 1984 ====
1984
Party	Candidate	Votes	%	±%
Liberal	Janet Blessing*	2,404	46.1	+8.3
Labour	John Rimington	1,897	36.3	+5.0
Conservative	Gerald Carey	918	17.6	−13.3
Majority		507	9.7	+3.2
Turnout		5,219		
Liberal hold		Swing	+1.6	

==== May 1983 ====
1983
Party	Candidate	Votes	%	±%
Liberal	Audrey Greaves	1,913	37.8	−4.4
Labour	John Rimington	1,583	31.3	+6.3
Conservative	John Monks	1,564	30.9	−1.8
Majority		330	6.5	−3.0
Turnout		5,060		
Liberal hold		Swing	-5.3	

==== May 1982 ====
1982 (3 vacancies; new boundaries)
Party	Candidate	Votes	%	±%
Liberal	Keith Whitmore*	2,029	41.8	
Liberal	Janet Blessing	1,792	36.9	
Liberal	Howard Smith*	1,743	35.9	
Conservative	John Barber*	1,573	32.4	
Conservative	Winifrede Carlton	1,484	30.6	
Conservative	John Monks	1,394	28.7	
Labour	Alison Jones	1,200	24.7	
Labour	John Rimington	1,189	24.5	
Labour	Rachel Pollard	1,177	24.3	
Majority		170	3.5	
Turnout		4,851	47.5	
Liberal win (new seat)				
Liberal win (new seat)				
Liberal win (new seat)				

==== May 1980 ====
1980
Party	Candidate	Votes	%	±%
Liberal	H. Smith	2,105	40.2	+3.6
Labour	R. M. Pilkington	1,962	37.5	+3.4
Conservative	W. Carlton*	1,171	22.4	−6.9
Majority		143	2.7	+0.2
Turnout		5,238	42.2	−30.0
Liberal gain from Conservative		Swing	+0.1	

=== Elections in 1970s ===
==== May 1979 ====
1979
Party	Candidate	Votes	%	±%
Liberal	Keith Whitmore	3,180	36.6	+14.5
Labour	R. A. Reddington	2,959	34.1	−3.1
Conservative	S. Alexander*	2,544	29.3	−11.4
Majority		221	2.5	−1.0
Turnout		8,683	72.2	+33.8
Liberal gain from Conservative		Swing	+8.8	

==== May 1978 ====
1978
Party	Candidate	Votes	%	±%
Conservative	J. K. Barber*	2,001	40.7	−10.9
Labour	S. Loughlin	1,827	37.2	−1.0
Liberal	K. Whitmore	1,085	22.1	+13.7
Majority		174	3.5	−9.9
Turnout		4,913	38.4	
Conservative hold		Swing	-4.9	

==== May 1976 ====
1976
Party	Candidate	Votes	%	±%
Conservative	W. Carlton*	2,506	51.6	−4.7
Labour	P. Hildrew	1,856	38.2	+4.7
Liberal	K. Whitmore	408	8.4	−1.8
Independent	P. J. Cassidy	86	1.8	+1.8
Majority		650	13.4	−9.4
Turnout		4,856		
Conservative hold		Swing	-4.7	

==== May 1975 ====
1975
Party	Candidate	Votes	%	±%
Conservative	S. Alexander*	2,406	56.3	−2.9
Labour	P. Hildrew	1,432	33.5	−7.3
Liberal	K. Osbourne	437	10.2	+10.2
Majority		974	22.8	+4.3
Turnout		4,275		
Conservative hold		Swing	+2.2	

==== May 1973 ====
1973 (3 vacancies; reorganisation)
Party	Candidate	Votes	%	±%
Conservative	J. K. Barber*	2,414	58.3	+4.0
Conservative	W. Carlton	2,253	54.4	+0.1
Conservative	S. D. Alexander	2,239	54.0	−0.3
Labour	E. H. Spencer	1,663	40.1	−5.6
Labour	F. Done	1,646	39.7	−6.0
Labour	J. Flanagan	1,597	38.5	−7.2
Majority		576	13.9	+5.3
Turnout		4,144		
Conservative hold		Swing		
Conservative gain from Labour		Swing		
Conservative gain from Labour		Swing		

==== May 1972 ====
1972
Party	Candidate	Votes	%	±%
Conservative	J. K. Barber	2,531	54.3	+10.0
Labour	A. E. Jones*	2,132	45.7	−9.9
Majority		399	8.6	
Turnout		4,663		
Conservative gain from Labour		Swing		

==== May 1971 ====
1971 (3 vacancies; new boundaries)
Party	Candidate	Votes	%	±%
Labour	C. Brierley	3,049	55.6	
Labour	N. I. Finley	3,047	55.8	
Labour	A. E. Jones	2,945	53.9	
Conservative	M. M. Hart*	2,420	44.3	
Conservative	J. K. Barber*	2,404	44.0	
Conservative	A. Williamson	2,307	42.3	
Communist	M. T. Worrall	214	3.9	
Majority		525	9.6	
Turnout		5,459		
Labour win (new seat)				
Labour win (new seat)				
Labour win (new seat)				

==== May 1970 ====
1970
Party	Candidate	Votes	%	±%
Conservative	A. Williamson*	2,251	64.7	−11.8
Labour	A. E. Jones	1,170	44.6	+10.1
Residents	F. F. Kienzler	56	1.7	N/A
Majority		1,081	31.1	−21.9
Turnout		3,477		
Conservative hold		Swing		

=== Elections in 1960s ===
==== May 1969 ====
1969
Party	Candidate	Votes	%	±%
Conservative	C. R. Robb*	2,755	76.5	+2.3
Labour	A. E. Jones	844	23.5	+6.4
Majority		1,911	53.0	−4.1
Turnout		3,599		
Conservative hold		Swing		

==== May 1968 ====
1968
Party	Candidate	Votes	%	±%
Conservative	J. K. Barber*	2,997	74.2	−0.5
Labour	S. Rimmer	691	17.1	−8.2
Liberal	R. P. Shippen	350	8.7	N/A
Majority		2,306	57.1	+7.7
Turnout		4,038		
Conservative hold		Swing		

==== May 1967 ====
1967
Party	Candidate	Votes	%	±%
Conservative	A. Williamson*	2,621	74.7	+12.8
Labour	H. N. Ebrey	889	25.3	−12.8
Majority		1,732	49.4	+25.6
Turnout		3,510		
Conservative hold		Swing		

==== June 1966 (by-election) ====
By-election: 23 June 1966
Party	Candidate	Votes	%	±%
Conservative	J. K. Barber	1,901	67.8	+5.9
Labour	H. N. Ebrey	904	32.2	−5.9
Majority		997	35.6	+11.8
Turnout		2,805		
Conservative hold		Swing		

==== May 1966 ====
1966
Party	Candidate	Votes	%	±%
Conservative	C. R. Robb*	2,478	61.9	+1.4
Labour	H. N. Ebrey	1,526	38.1	+10.8
Majority		952	23.8	−9.3
Turnout		4,004		
Conservative hold		Swing		

==== September 1965 (by-election) ====
By-election: 30 September 1965
Party	Candidate	Votes	%	±%
Conservative	C. S. Robb	1,996	55.6	−4.9
Labour	H. N. Ebrey	1,037	28.9	+1.6
Liberal	R. P. Shippen	554	15.5	+3.3
Majority		959	26.7	−6.4
Turnout		3,587		
Conservative hold		Swing		

==== May 1965 ====
1965
Party	Candidate	Votes	%	±%
Conservative	R. A. Fieldhouse*	2,917	60.5	+15.5
Labour	H. N. Ebrey	1,319	27.3	−9.7
Liberal	R. P. Shippen	587	12.2	−5.8
Majority		1,598	33.1	+25.1
Turnout		4,823		
Conservative hold		Swing		

==== May 1964 ====
1964
Party	Candidate	Votes	%	±%
Conservative	A. Williamson	2,204	45.0	+0.8
Labour	J. T. Morgan	1,815	37.0	−2.6
Liberal	G. S. Norris	883	18.0	+1.8
Majority		389	8.0	+3.4
Turnout		4,902		
Conservative hold		Swing		

==== May 1963 ====
1963
Party	Candidate	Votes	%	±%
Conservative	O. Lodge*	2,347	44.2	+6.0
Labour	R. Hardisty	2,101	39.6	+15.5
Liberal	S. W. Chinn	863	16.2	−2.4
Majority		246	4.6	−9.5
Turnout		5,311		
Conservative hold		Swing		

==== May 1962 ====
1962
Party	Candidate	Votes	%	±%
Conservative	R. A. Fieldhouse*	2,139	38.2	+0.9
Labour	A. Hardisty	1,349	24.1	+6.0
Ratepayers	J. A. Gannon	1,057	18.9	−10.2
Liberal	S. W. Chinn	1,043	18.6	+3.1
Union Movement	W. Hesketh	51	0.9	N/A
Majority		790	14.1	+5.9
Turnout		5,593		
Conservative hold		Swing		

==== May 1961 ====
1961
Party	Candidate	Votes	%	±%
Conservative	J. Bowes*	2,095	37.3	−3.0
Ratepayers	J. A. Gannon	1,632	29.1	−4.1
Labour	A. Hardisty	1,017	18.1	+4.8
Liberal	J. Berisford	867	15.5	+2.4
Majority		463	8.2	+1.1
Turnout		5,611		
Conservative hold		Swing		

==== May 1960 ====
1960
Party	Candidate	Votes	%	±%
Conservative	O. Lodge*	1,980	40.3	−7.3
Ratepayers	J. A. Gannon	1,633	33.2	N/A
Labour	A. E. Bowden	656	13.3	−14.3
Liberal	J. Berisford	646	13.1	−11.7
Majority		347	7.1	−12.9
Turnout		4,915		
Conservative hold		Swing		

=== Elections in 1950s ===
==== May 1959 ====
1959
Party	Candidate	Votes	%	±%
Conservative	R. A. Fieldhouse*	2,602	47.6	+2.7
Labour	A. E. Bowden	1,508	27.6	−4.5
Liberal	G. E. Sharp	1,357	24.8	+1.8
Majority		1,094	20.0	+7.2
Turnout		5,467		
Conservative hold		Swing		

==== May 1958 ====
1958
Party	Candidate	Votes	%	±%
Conservative	J. Bowes*	2,341	44.9	−19.2
Labour	A. E. Bowden	1,672	32.1	−3.8
Liberal	G. W. Oliver	1,198	23.0	N/A
Majority		1,143	12.8	−15.4
Turnout		5,211		
Conservative hold		Swing		

==== May 1957 ====
1957
Party	Candidate	Votes	%	±%
Conservative	O. Lodge*	2,748	64.1	−1.2
Labour	D. Barker	1,536	35.9	+1.2
Majority		1,212	28.2	−2.4
Turnout		4,284		
Conservative hold		Swing		

==== May 1956 ====
1956
Party	Candidate	Votes	%	±%
Conservative	R. A. Fieldhouse*	2,597	65.3	−7.4
Labour	W. Pearlman	1,380	34.7	+7.4
Majority		1,217	30.6	−14.8
Turnout		3,977		
Conservative hold		Swing		

==== May 1955 ====
1955
Party	Candidate	Votes	%	±%
Conservative	J. Bowes*	3,578	72.7	+19.5
Labour	S. Carter	1,346	27.3	−5.1
Majority		2,232	45.4	+24.6
Turnout		4,924		
Conservative hold		Swing		

==== May 1954 ====
1954
Party	Candidate	Votes	%	±%
Conservative	O. Lodge*	3,134	53.2	+5.2
Labour	H. J. Wimbury	1,908	32.4	−4.2
Liberal	E. Quiligotti	852	14.4	−1.0
Majority		1,226	20.8	+9.4
Turnout		5,894		
Conservative hold		Swing		

==== May 1953 ====
1953
Party	Candidate	Votes	%	±%
Conservative	R. A. Fieldhouse*	3,115	48.0	−9.1
Labour	F. Hatton	2,371	36.6	−6.3
Liberal	G. P. Robinson	1,001	15.4	N/A
Majority		744	11.4	−2.8
Turnout		6,487		
Conservative hold		Swing		

==== May 1952 ====
1952
Party	Candidate	Votes	%	±%
Conservative	J. Bowes*	4,384	57.1	−13.9
Labour	F. Hatton	3,298	42.9	+13.9
Majority		1,086	14.2	−27.8
Turnout		7,682		
Conservative hold		Swing		

==== May 1951 ====
1951
Party	Candidate	Votes	%	±%
Conservative	O. Lodge*	4,638	71.0	+6.8
Labour	B. Coulan	1,890	29.0	−5.6
Majority		2,748	42.0	+12.4
Turnout		6,528		
Conservative hold		Swing		

==== May 1950 ====
1950 (new boundaries)
Party	Candidate	Votes	%	±%
Conservative	R. A. Fieldhouse*	4,500	64.2	
Labour	F. Hatton	2,422	34.6	
Communist	M. J. Farrington	85	1.2	
Majority		2,078	29.6	
Turnout		7,007		
Conservative hold		Swing		

=== Elections in 1940s ===
==== May 1949 ====
1949
Party	Candidate	Votes	%	±%
Conservative	J. Bowes*	4,747	55.1	+4.5
Labour	F. Hatton	2,829	32.9	+0.2
Liberal	W. Fleetwood	1,032	12.0	−4.7
Majority		1,918	22.2	+4.3
Turnout		8,608		
Conservative hold		Swing		

==== November 1947 ====
1947
Party	Candidate	Votes	%	±%
Conservative	O. Lodge*	4,979	50.6	+13.6
Labour	S. Freeman	3,214	32.7	+3.8
Liberal	C. R. de la Wyche	1,642	16.7	−11.3
Majority		1,765	17.9	+9.8
Turnout		9,835		
Conservative hold		Swing		

==== November 1946 ====
1946
Party	Candidate	Votes	%	±%
Conservative	R. A. Fieldhouse	2,895	37.0	+1.8
Labour	C. Madden	2,262	28.9	+3.1
Liberal	C. R. de la Wyche*	2,194	28.0	−6.3
Ind. Labour Party	F. Hatton	473	6.1	+1.5
Majority		633	8.1	
Turnout		7,824		
Conservative gain from Liberal		Swing		

==== November 1945 ====
1945 (3 vacancies)
Party	Candidate	Votes	%	±%
Conservative	J. Bowes*	3,821	35.2	−27.0
Conservative	O. Lodge*	3,786	34.9	−27.3
Liberal	C. R. de la Wyche*	3,721	34.3	N/A
Labour	C. Bamber	2,801	25.8	−12.0
Labour	M. Geliher	2,754	25.4	−12.4
Labour	V. Wilson	2,613	24.1	−13.7
Ind. Labour Party	F. Hatton	499	4.6	N/A
Ind. Labour Party	W. Kelly	323	3.0	N/A
Majority		920	8.5	
Turnout		10,842	72.7	
Conservative hold		Swing		
Conservative hold		Swing		
Liberal hold		Swing		

=== Elections in 1930s ===
==== November 1938 ====
1938
Party	Candidate	Votes	%	±%
Conservative	H. M. Emery*	2,640	62.2	N/A
Labour	B. de Courcey Ireland	1,602	37.8	+0.6
Majority		1,038	24.4	
Turnout		4,242		
Conservative hold		Swing		

==== November 1937 ====
1937
Party	Candidate	Votes	%	±%
Liberal	C. R. de la Wyche*	2,584	62.8	N/A
Labour	M. Knight	1,528	37.2	+3.2
Majority		1,056	25.6	
Turnout		4,112		
Liberal hold		Swing		

==== November 1936 ====
1936
Party	Candidate	Votes	%	±%
Conservative	S. R. Fairfoull*	2,832	66.0	N/A
Labour	M. Knight	1,456	34.0	N/A
Majority		1,376	32.0	N/A
Turnout		4,288		
Conservative hold		Swing		

==== November 1935 ====
1935
Party	Candidate	Votes	%	±%
Conservative	H. M. Emery*	uncontested		
Conservative hold		Swing		

==== November 1934 ====
1934
Party	Candidate	Votes	%	±%
Liberal	C. R. de la Wyche*	1,979	62.0	N/A
Labour	G. Darling	1,213	38.0	N/A
Majority		766	24.0	N/A
Turnout		3,192		
Liberal hold		Swing		

==== November 1933 ====
1933
Party	Candidate	Votes	%	±%
Conservative	S. R. Fairfoull*	uncontested		
Conservative hold		Swing		

==== November 1932 ====
1932
Party	Candidate	Votes	%	±%
Conservative	H. M. Emery*	2,881	69.2	N/A
Labour	J. Moohan	1,280	30.8	N/A
Majority		1,601	38.4	N/A
Turnout		4,161		
Conservative hold		Swing		

==== November 1931 ====
1931
Party	Candidate	Votes	%	±%
Liberal	C. R. de la Wyche*	uncontested		
Liberal hold		Swing		

==== November 1930 ====
1930
Party	Candidate	Votes	%	±%
Conservative	S. R. Fairfoull*	2,819	71.7	+5.5
Labour	W. N. Bayes	1,110	28.3	−5.5
Majority		1,709	43.4	+11.0
Turnout		3,929		
Conservative hold		Swing		

=== Elections in 1920s ===
==== November 1929 ====
1929
Party	Candidate	Votes	%	±%
Conservative	H. M. Emery*	2,510	66.2	N/A
Labour	W. N. Bayes	1,281	33.8	+5.9
Majority		1,229	32.4	
Turnout		3,791	36.5	−10.9
Conservative hold		Swing		

==== November 1928 ====
1928
Party	Candidate	Votes	%	±%
Liberal	C. R. de la Wyche*	2,987	65.5	N/A
Labour	W. N. Bayes	1,272	27.9	N/A
Co-operative Party	E. C. Arundale	270	5.9	N/A
Residents	E. Walker	32	0.7	N/A
Majority		1,715	37.6	N/A
Turnout		4,288	47.4	N/A
Liberal hold		Swing		

==== June 1928 (by-election) ====
By-election: 19 June 1928
Party	Candidate	Votes	%	±%
Conservative	S. R. Fairfoull	1,919	44.1	−7.5
Liberal	A. Heywood	1,685	38.7	+10.6
Labour	W. H. Holding	745	17.1	−3.0
Majority		234	5.4	−18.1
Turnout		4,349		
Conservative hold		Swing		

==== May 1928 (by-election) ====
By-election: 15 May 1928
Party	Candidate	Votes	%	±%
Conservative	H. M. Emery	2,530	51.6	N/A
Liberal	A. Heywood	1,380	28.1	N/A
Labour	W. H. Holding	984	20.1	N/A
Residents	A. R. Edwards	12	0.2	N/A
Majority		1,150	23.5	N/A
Turnout		4,906		
Conservative gain from Independent		Swing		

==== November 1927 ====
1927
Party	Candidate	Votes	%	±%
Conservative	R. S. Harper*	uncontested		
Conservative hold		Swing		

==== July 1927 (by-election) ====
By-election: 7 July 1927
Party	Candidate	Votes	%	±%
Liberal	C. R. de la Wyche	2,597	81.6	N/A
Labour	A. Woolley	585	18.4	N/A
Majority		2,012	63.2	N/A
Turnout		3,182		
Liberal hold		Swing		

==== November 1926 ====
1926
Party	Candidate	Votes	%	±%
Independent	J. Harrison*	uncontested		
Independent hold		Swing		

==== November 1925 ====
1925
Party	Candidate	Votes	%	±%
Liberal	M. E. Mitchell*	uncontested		
Liberal hold		Swing		

==== November 1924 ====
1924
Party	Candidate	Votes	%	±%
Independent	R. S. Harper*	uncontested		
Independent hold		Swing		

==== November 1923 ====
1923
Party	Candidate	Votes	%	±%
Independent	J. Harrison*	3,384	64.1	N/A
Labour	W. Davis	1,899	35.9	N/A
Majority		1,485	28.2	N/A
Turnout		5,457		
Independent hold		Swing		

==== November 1922 ====
1922
Party	Candidate	Votes	%	±%
Liberal	M. E. Mitchell*	uncontested		
Liberal hold		Swing		

==== November 1921 ====
1921
Party	Candidate	Votes	%	±%
Independent	R. S. Harper*	3,728	84.6	+21.4
Labour	W. H. Depledge	678	15.4	−21.4
Majority		3,050	69.2	+42.9
Turnout		4,406	48.8	−5.4
Independent hold		Swing		

==== November 1920 ====
1920
Party	Candidate	Votes	%	±%
Independent	J. Harrison*	3,277	63.2	+12.8
Labour	L. B. Cox	1,911	36.8	−7.4
Majority		1,366	26.3	+20.3
Turnout		5,188	54.2	+10.6
Independent hold		Swing		

=== Elections in 1910s ===
==== November 1919 ====
1919 (3 vacancies)
Party	Candidate	Votes	%	±%
Liberal	M. E. Mitchell*	2,221	53.2	
Liberal	R. S. Harper*	2,191	52.5	
Independent	J. Harrison*	2,104	50.4	
Labour	L. B. Cox	1,854	44.4	
Co-operative Party	E. C. Arundale	1,432	34.3	
Conservative	L. Dobson*	1,381	33.1	
Conservative	F. Fenn*	1,333	32.0	
Majority		250	6.0	
Turnout		4,172	43.6	
Liberal win (new seat)				
Liberal win (new seat)				
Independent win (new seat)				

== See also ==
- Manchester City Council
- Manchester City Council elections
