= 1996 Manchester City Council election =

Local elections

- 2 May 1996

35 of 99 seats to Manchester City Council 50 seats needed for a majority
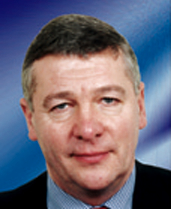
	First party	Second party
Leader	Graham Stringer	Keith Whitmore
Party	Labour	Liberal Democrats
Leader's seat	Harpurhey	Levenshulme
Last election	30 seats, 63.2%	4 seats, 20.7%
Seats before	83	14
Seats won	29	6
Seats after	84	15
Seat change	▲1	▲1
Popular vote	48,518	17,753
Percentage	60.1%	22.0%
Swing	▼3.1%	▲1.3%
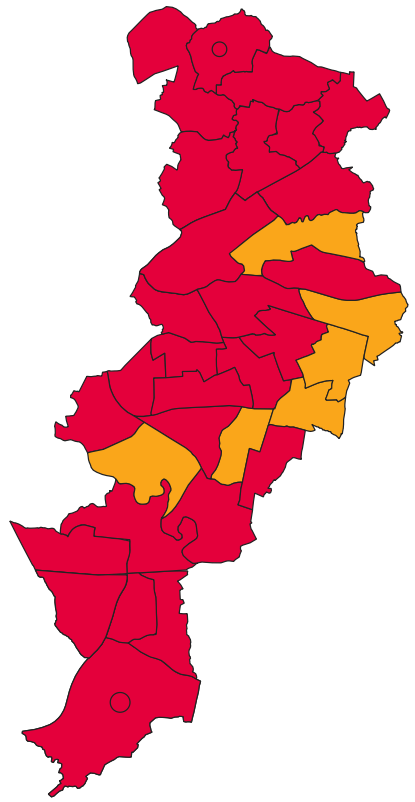
- Map of results of 1996 election
Leader of the Council before election
Graham Stringer
Labour
Leader of the Council after election
Graham Stringer
Labour

Elections to Manchester City Council were held on Thursday, 2 May 1996. One third of the council was up for election, with each successful candidate to serve a four-year term of office, expiring in 2000. There were also two vacancies being contested; one in Blackley and the other in Woodhouse Park. The Labour Party retained overall control of the Council.

== Election result ==
Party	Votes		Seats			Full Council	
Labour Party	48,518 (60.1%)	▼3.1	29 (82.8%)	29 / 35	▲1	84 (84.8%)	84 / 99
Liberal Democrats	17,753 (22.0%)	▲1.3	6 (17.1%)	6 / 35	▲1	15 (15.2%)	15 / 99
Conservative Party	10,512 (13.0%)	▲1.3	0 (0.0%)	0 / 35	▼2	0 (0.0%)	0 / 99
Green Party	2,353 (2.9%)	▲1.0	0 (0.0%)	0 / 35	Steady	0 (0.0%)	0 / 99
Residents	436 (0.5%)	N/A	0 (0.0%)	0 / 35	N/A	0 (0.0%)	0 / 99
Socialist Alternative	405 (0.5%)	N/A	0 (0.0%)	0 / 35	N/A	0 (0.0%)	0 / 99
Independent	231 (0.3%)	▼1.5	0 (0.0%)	0 / 35	Steady	0 (0.0%)	0 / 99
Independent Labour	225 (0.3%)	▼0.1	0 (0.0%)	0 / 35	Steady	0 (0.0%)	0 / 99
Liberal	215 (0.3%)	▲0.2	0 (0.0%)	0 / 35	Steady	0 (0.0%)	0 / 99
Communist League	55 (0.1%)	N/A	0 (0.0%)	0 / 35	N/A	0 (0.0%)	0 / 99
Independent Liberal	33 (0.0%)	N/A	0 (0.0%)	0 / 35	N/A	0 (0.0%)	0 / 99

↓
84	15

== Ward results ==
=== Ardwick ===
Ardwick
Party	Candidate	Votes	%	±%
Labour	Thomas O'Callaghan	1,054	76.5	−0.9
Liberal Democrats	David Gray	144	10.5	+0.6
Conservative	John Davenport	133	9.7	+3.2
Green	Bruce Bingham	46	3.3	+3.3
Majority		910	66.1	−1.4
Turnout		1,377		
Labour hold		Swing	-0.7	

=== Baguley ===
Baguley
Party	Candidate	Votes	%	±%
Labour	Anthony Burns*	1,468	74.1	−3.8
Conservative	Trevor Roberts	307	15.5	+3.4
Liberal Democrats	Cath Hall	152	7.7	−0.3
Residents	Hannah Berry	53	2.7	+2.7
Majority		1,161	58.6	−7.5
Turnout		1,980		
Labour hold		Swing	-3.6	

=== Barlow Moor ===
Barlow Moor
Party	Candidate	Votes	%	±%
Liberal Democrats	Simon Wheale*	1,570	48.5	+14.5
Labour	Valerie Dunn	1,339	41.4	−12.2
Conservative	Bill Moore	229	7.1	−1.0
Green	A. Kulpa	100	3.1	−1.2
Majority		231	7.1	−12.5
Turnout		3,238		
Liberal Democrats hold		Swing	+13.3	

=== Benchill ===
Benchill
Party	Candidate	Votes	%	±%
Labour	Veronica Myers*	1,037	77.7	−8.4
Liberal Democrats	Janice Redmond	124	9.3	−1.9
Conservative	Carol Roberts	101	7.6	+7.6
Socialist	T. Jefferies	72	5.4	+5.4
Majority		913	68.4	−6.6
Turnout		1,334		
Labour hold		Swing	-3.2	

=== Beswick and Clayton ===
Beswick and Clayton
Party	Candidate	Votes	%	±%
Liberal Democrats	Mark Clayton	1,133	47.9	−10.7
Labour	John Flanagan*	1,091	46.1	+7.3
Residents	K. Corcoran	73	3.1	+3.1
Conservative	Jeffrey Leach	70	3.0	+0.8
Majority		42	1.8	−18.0
Turnout		2,367		
Liberal Democrats gain from Labour		Swing	-9.0	

=== Blackley ===
Blackley
Party	Candidate	Votes	%	±%
Labour	Kenneth Barnes*	1,573	63.5	−13.0
Labour	Harold Lyons	1,317		
Conservative	Henry Coombes	322	13.0	+1.0
Liberal Democrats	Peter Matthews	267	10.8	+1.2
Independent	Carol Connell	231	9.3	+9.3
Liberal Democrats	Graham Shaw	124		
Green	R. Maile	84	3.4	+3.4
Majority		995	50.5	−14.0
Turnout		2,477		
Labour hold		Swing		
Labour hold		Swing	-7.0	

=== Bradford ===
Bradford
Party	Candidate	Votes	%	±%
Labour	Paul Kelly*	1,152	76.2	+5.9
Liberal Democrats	S. Kennedy	212	14.0	−6.8
Conservative	Elena Stars	98	6.5	+0.6
Green	Elaine Brown	50	3.3	+0.4
Majority		940	62.2	+12.7
Turnout		1,512		
Labour hold		Swing	+6.3	

=== Brooklands ===
Brooklands
Party	Candidate	Votes	%	±%
Labour	Susan Cooley	1,152	56.4	−10.7
Conservative	Paul Cummins*	672	32.9	+11.7
Liberal Democrats	Anthony McGarr	182	8.9	−1.2
Residents	J. Hamilton	35	1.7	+1.7
Majority		480	23.5	−22.4
Turnout		2,041		
Labour gain from Conservative		Swing	-11.2	

=== Burnage ===
Burnage
Party	Candidate	Votes	%	±%
Labour	Kathleen Robinson	1,834	66.8	−4.8
Liberal Democrats	J. Parkinson	434	15.8	+1.1
Conservative	Christopher Brown	415	15.1	+3.9
Residents	C. Mumford	63	2.3	+2.3
Majority		1,400	51.0	−5.9
Turnout		2,746		
Labour hold		Swing	-2.9	

=== Central ===
Central
Party	Candidate	Votes	%	±%
Labour	Gordon Conquest*	975	77.7	−4.4
Conservative	Ann Hodkinson	150	12.0	+5.2
Liberal Democrats	W. Tew	109	8.7	+1.7
Green	L. Maile	21	1.7	+1.7
Majority		825	65.7	−9.4
Turnout		1,255		
Labour hold		Swing	-4.8	

=== Charlestown ===
Charlestown
Party	Candidate	Votes	%	±%
Labour	Mark Hackett*	1,635	76.2	−0.2
Conservative	Christine Saunders	266	12.4	−0.7
Liberal Democrats	Vera Towers	200	9.3	+0.6
Residents	H. Baker	44	2.1	+2.1
Majority		1,369	63.8	+0.4
Turnout		2,145		
Labour hold		Swing	+0.2	

=== Cheetham ===
Cheetham
Party	Candidate	Votes	%	±%
Labour	Christopher Olaniyan	1,697	83.1	+4.7
Liberal	Richard Wilson	215	10.5	+4.9
Liberal Democrats	G. Epps	130	6.4	+1.8
Majority		1,482	72.6	+1.4
Turnout		2,042		
Labour hold		Swing	-0.1	

=== Chorlton ===
Chorlton
Party	Candidate	Votes	%	±%
Labour	Mary Humphreys	2,796	68.1	+0.2
Conservative	Malcolm Cleall-Hill	734	17.9	+2.7
Liberal Democrats	Helen Fisher	309	7.5	−2.8
Green	Brian Candeland	269	6.5	+0.0
Majority		2,062	50.2	−2.5
Turnout		4,108		
Labour hold		Swing	-1.2	

=== Crumpsall ===
Crumpsall
Party	Candidate	Votes	%	±%
Labour	Richard Leese*	1,913	74.2	−0.4
Conservative	Teresa Skorsewski	398	15.4	+1.4
Liberal Democrats	J. Spurway	201	7.8	−1.1
Residents	J. Riemer	65	2.5	+2.5
Majority		1,515	58.8	−1.8
Turnout		2,577		
Labour hold		Swing	-0.9	

=== Didsbury ===
Didsbury
Party	Candidate	Votes	%	±%
Labour	Pamela Smythe	1,834	38.2	−5.2
Conservative	Peter Hilton*	1,559	32.4	+3.5
Liberal Democrats	David Sandiford	1,352	28.1	+1.8
Residents	K. Harkavy	62	1.3	+1.3
Majority		275	5.7	−8.8
Turnout		4,807		
Labour gain from Conservative		Swing	-4.3	

=== Fallowfield ===
Fallowfield
Party	Candidate	Votes	%	±%
Labour	David Royle*	1,584	69.9	+12.0
Conservative	Simon Davenport	306	13.5	+1.5
Liberal Democrats	James Graham	235	10.4	−0.2
Green	Michael Daw	142	6.3	−4.3
Majority		1,278	56.4	+10.5
Turnout		2,267		
Labour hold		Swing	+5.2	

=== Gorton North ===
Gorton North
Party	Candidate	Votes	%	±%
Liberal Democrats	Iain Donaldson*	1,795	52.2	+1.2
Labour	Bill Egerton	1,466	42.6	−1.9
Conservative	M. Higginbottom	155	4.5	+1.1
Residents	Melanie Jarman	23	0.7	+0.7
Majority		329	9.6	+3.1
Turnout		3,439		
Liberal Democrats hold		Swing	+1.5	

=== Gorton South ===
Gorton South
Party	Candidate	Votes	%	±%
Liberal Democrats	Simon Ashley*	1,733	57.3	+7.6
Labour	B. Whitehead	1,167	38.6	−7.7
Conservative	D. Davenport	90	3.0	−0.0
Green	A. Salter	34	1.1	+1.1
Majority		566	18.7	+15.3
Turnout		3,024		
Liberal Democrats hold		Swing	+7.6	

=== Harpurhey ===
Harpurhey
Party	Candidate	Votes	%	±%
Labour	Graham Stringer*	1,176	72.5	+3.1
Liberal Democrats	L. Dyke	192	11.8	−7.3
Conservative	Dorothy Keller	150	9.2	−2.3
Green	C. Maile	104	6.4	+6.4
Majority		984	60.7	+10.4
Turnout		1,622		
Labour hold		Swing	+5.2	

=== Hulme ===
Hulme
Party	Candidate	Votes	%	±%
Labour	Kevin Rowswell*	708	74.0	−5.3
Green	Robin Goater	75	7.8	+7.8
Liberal Democrats	S. Oliver	72	7.5	+2.0
Conservative	Paul Kierman	69	7.2	+1.3
Independent Liberal	Charles Lyn-Lloyd	33	3.4	+1.3
Majority		633	66.1	−7.3
Turnout		957		
Labour hold		Swing	-6.5	

=== Levenshulme ===
Levenshulme
Party	Candidate	Votes	%	±%
Liberal Democrats	John Commons*	1,908	57.2	−0.7
Labour	Zafar Mir	1,149	34.4	−0.5
Conservative	Paul Mostyn	142	4.3	+0.5
Green	A. Mohamood	107	3.2	+3.2
Communist League	A. Howie	32	1.0	+1.0
Majority		759	22.7	−0.3
Turnout		3,338		
Liberal Democrats hold		Swing	-0.1	

=== Lightbowne ===
Lightbowne
Party	Candidate	Votes	%	±%
Labour	William Risby*	1,757	75.8	+2.0
Conservative	M. Steadman	315	13.6	−0.1
Liberal Democrats	David Gordon	186	8.0	−1.6
Green	Philip Maile	60	2.6	−0.3
Majority		1,442	62.2	+2.1
Turnout		2,318		
Labour hold		Swing	+1.0	

=== Longsight ===
Longsight
Party	Candidate	Votes	%	±%
Labour	Mohammed Akhtar	1,520	46.9	−10.6
Conservative	Muhammed Naqui	788	24.3	−2.3
Liberal Democrats	Abu Chowdhury	414	12.8	+5.1
Green	Spencer Fitzgibbon	293	9.0	+0.8
Independent Labour	M. Middleton	225	6.9	+6.9
Majority		732	22.6	−8.3
Turnout		3,240		
Labour hold		Swing	-4.1	

=== Moss Side ===
Moss Side
Party	Candidate	Votes	%	±%
Labour	Vince Young*	1,437	79.5	+3.3
Liberal Democrats	Richard Powell	139	7.7	+2.5
Conservative	Mary Barnes	137	7.6	−0.6
Green	Lucy Fogarty	95	5.3	−1.5
Majority		1,298	71.8	+3.8
Turnout		1,808		
Labour hold		Swing	+0.4	

=== Moston ===
Moston
Party	Candidate	Votes	%	±%
Labour	Patrick Mullin	1,762	72.9	−3.2
Conservative	Gregory Skorzewski	368	15.2	+0.8
Liberal Democrats	Howard Totty	269	11.1	+5.9
Residents	R. Conibere	18	0.7	+0.7
Majority		1,394	57.7	−4.0
Turnout		2,417		
Labour hold		Swing	-2.0	

=== Newton Heath ===
Newton Heath
Party	Candidate	Votes	%	±%
Labour	John Smith*	1,349	80.2	−2.8
Conservative	E. Fisher	169	10.0	+0.6
Liberal Democrats	C. Turner	118	7.0	+0.8
Green	P. Brown	47	2.8	+2.8
Majority		1,180	70.1	−3.5
Turnout		1,683		
Labour hold		Swing	-1.7	

=== Northenden ===
Northenden
Party	Candidate	Votes	%	±%
Labour	Sandra Bracegirdle*	1,816	69.0	−0.9
Conservative	K. McKenna	476	18.1	+2.6
Liberal Democrats	Ronald Axtell	226	8.6	−3.9
Green	Lance Crookes	113	4.3	+4.3
Majority		1,340	50.9	−3.4
Turnout		2,631		
Labour hold		Swing	-1.7	

=== Old Moat ===
Old Moat
Party	Candidate	Votes	%	±%
Labour	Brian Harrison*	2,126	67.0	−3.8
Conservative	Graham Betton	433	13.6	+2.0
Liberal Democrats	Yasmen Zalzala	324	10.2	−2.7
Green	Teresa Romagnuolo	196	6.2	+1.5
Socialist	J. White	94	3.0	+3.0
Majority		1,693	53.4	−4.6
Turnout		3,173		
Labour hold		Swing	-2.9	

=== Rusholme ===
Rusholme
Party	Candidate	Votes	%	±%
Labour	Yomi Mambu*	1,224	49.9	+7.4
Liberal Democrats	Shakeel Ahmad	732	29.9	−4.0
Socialist	Margaret Manning	239	9.7	+9.7
Conservative	Daniel Bunting	232	9.5	+6.6
Communist League	T. Rigby	23	0.9	+0.9
Majority		492	20.0	+11.4
Turnout		2,450		
Labour hold		Swing	+5.7	

=== Sharston ===
Sharston
Party	Candidate	Votes	%	±%
Labour	Griffith Berry*	1,298	75.7	−3.6
Conservative	Robert Caddick	186	10.9	+0.9
Liberal Democrats	S. Toole	180	10.5	+1.6
Green	P. Johnson	50	2.9	+2.9
Majority		1,112	64.9	−4.4
Turnout		1,714		
Labour hold		Swing	-2.2	

=== Whalley Range ===
Whalley Range
Party	Candidate	Votes	%	±%
Labour	Kath Fry*	1,755	60.2	+4.5
Conservative	Richard West	657	22.5	−5.8
Liberal Democrats	John Leech	338	11.6	+0.1
Green	Mary Candeland	164	5.6	+1.1
Majority		1,098	64.6	+37.1
Turnout		2,914		
Labour hold		Swing	+5.1	

=== Withington ===
Withington
Party	Candidate	Votes	%	±%
Liberal Democrats	Alison Firth*	2,187	53.2	+10.1
Labour	Joanne Green	1,532	37.3	−7.1
Conservative	J. Callaghan	249	6.1	−2.5
Green	Bernard Ekbery	142	3.5	−0.5
Majority		655	15.9	+14.5
Turnout		4,110		
Liberal Democrats hold		Swing	+8.6	

=== Woodhouse Park ===
Woodhouse Park
Party	Candidate	Votes	%	±%
Labour	Leo Collins	1,142	70.3	−11.2
Labour	Paul Andrews	1,103		
Liberal Democrats	William Fisher	186	11.4	−7.1
Liberal Democrats	Robert Harrison	178		
Green	G. Lawson	161	9.9	+9.9
Conservative	L. Maguire	136	8.4	+8.4
Majority		917	58.9	−4.2
Turnout		2,906		
Labour hold		Swing		
Labour hold		Swing	-2.0	

== By-elections between 1996 and 1998 ==
Hulme By-Election 2 May 1997
Party	Candidate	Votes	%	±%
Labour	Mary Murphy	1,937	69.4	−4.6
Liberal Democrats	James Graham	561	20.1	+12.5
Conservative	Paul Kierman	293	10.5	+3.3
Majority		1,376	49.3	−16.8
Turnout		2,791	51.1	
Labour hold		Swing	-8.5	

Old Moat By-Election 2 May 1997
Party	Candidate	Votes	%	±%
Labour	Jeffrey Smith	3,790	51.9	−15.9
Liberal Democrats	Yasmin Zalzala	1,690	22.8	+12.6
Conservative	Christopher Brown	1,256	17.0	+3.3
Independent Labour	Michael Robinson	511	6.9	+6.9
Socialist Labour	Julie White	163	2.2	+2.2
Majority		2,100	29.1	−24.3
Turnout		7,410	61.6	
Labour hold		Swing	-14.2	
