= 1995 Manchester City Council election =

1995 UK local government election

- 4 May 1995

34 of 99 seats to Manchester City Council 50 seats needed for a majority
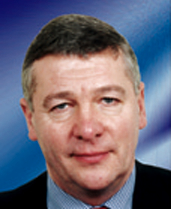
	First party	Second party	Third party
Leader	Graham Stringer	Keith Whitmore	Peter Hilton
Party	Labour	Liberal Democrats	Conservative
Leader's seat	Harpurhey	Levenshulme	Didsbury
Last election	28 seats, 59.2%	5 seats, 24.0%	0 seats, 13.5%
Seats before	78	16	4
Seats won	30	4	0
Seats after	83	14	2
Seat change	▲5	▼2	▼2
Popular vote	57,270	18,759	10,636
Percentage	63.2%	20.7%	11.7%
Swing	▲4.0%	▼3.3%	▼1.8%
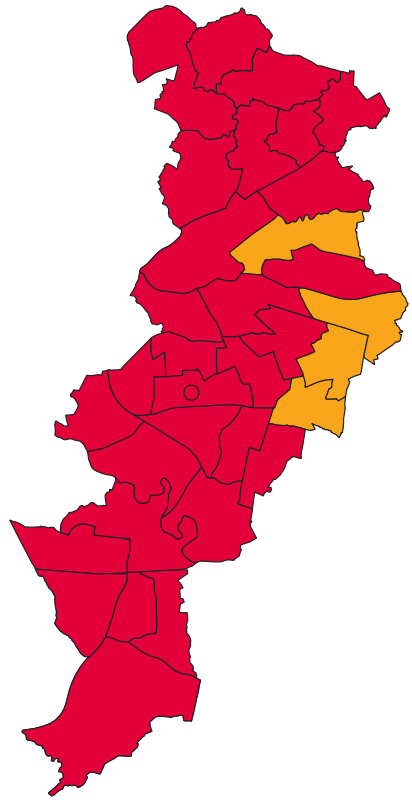
- Map of results of 1995 election
Leader of the Council before election
Graham Stringer
Labour
Leader of the Council after election
Graham Stringer
Labour

Elections to Manchester City Council were held on Thursday, 4 May 1995. One third of the council was up for election, with each successful candidate to serve a four-year term of office, expiring in 1999. The Labour Party retained overall control of the Council.

== Election result ==
Party	Votes		Seats			Full Council	
Labour Party	57,270 (63.2%)	▲4.0	30 (88.2%)	30 / 34	▲5	83 (83.8%)	83 / 99
Liberal Democrats	18,759 (20.7%)	▼3.3	4 (11.7%)	4 / 34	▼2	14 (14.1%)	14 / 99
Conservative Party	10,636 (11.7%)	▼1.8	0 (0.0%)	0 / 34	▼2	2 (2.0%)	2 / 99
Green Party	1,753 (1.9%)	Steady	0 (0.0%)	0 / 34	Steady	0 (0.0%)	0 / 99
Independent	1,690 (1.8%)	▲1.0	0 (0.0%)	0 / 34	Steady	0 (0.0%)	0 / 99
Independent Labour	371 (0.4%)	▲0.2	0 (0.0%)	0 / 34	▼1	0 (0.0%)	0 / 99
Liberal	129 (0.1%)	N/A	0 (0.0%)	0 / 34	N/A	0 (0.0%)	0 / 99
Natural Law	19 (0.0%)	N/A	0 (0.0%)	0 / 34	N/A	0 (0.0%)	0 / 99

↓
83	14	2

== Ward results ==
=== Ardwick ===
Ardwick
Party	Candidate	Votes	%	±%
Labour	Irene Summers	1,222	77.4	+2.2
Liberal Democrats	S. Oliver	157	9.9	−8.2
Conservative	Ann Hodkinson	102	6.5	−0.2
Independent	S. O'Sullivan	97	6.1	+6.1
Majority		1,065	67.5	+10.3
Turnout		1,578		
Labour hold		Swing	+5.2	

=== Baguley ===
Baguley
Party	Candidate	Votes	%	±%
Labour	Gerald Jones	1,836	77.9	+6.1
Conservative	Trevor Roberts	286	12.1	−3.0
Liberal Democrats	V. Purcell	188	8.0	−5.0
Independent	Emma Hamilton	46	2.0	+2.0
Majority		1,550	65.8	+9.1
Turnout		2,356		
Labour hold		Swing	+4.5	

=== Barlow Moor ===
Barlow Moor
Party	Candidate	Votes	%	±%
Labour	Kathleen Bloch	1,775	53.6	+5.1
Liberal Democrats	V. Bingham	1,126	34.0	−4.4
Conservative	M. Higginbottom	268	8.1	−0.2
Green	Robin Goater	142	4.3	−0.5
Majority		649	19.6	+9.5
Turnout		3,311		
Labour gain from Liberal Democrats		Swing	+4.7	

=== Benchill ===
Benchill
Party	Candidate	Votes	%	±%
Labour	Niel Warren*	1,455	86.1	+15.0
Liberal Democrats	Janice Redmond	189	11.2	+1.2
Independent	J. Pickering	45	2.7	+2.7
Majority		1,266	75.0	+16.8
Turnout		1,689		
Labour hold		Swing	+6.9	

=== Beswick and Clayton ===
Beswick and Clayton
Party	Candidate	Votes	%	±%
Liberal Democrats	Ken Dobson*	1,622	58.6	+3.3
Labour	D. Parkes	1,073	38.8	−2.7
Conservative	Richard West	60	2.2	−1.0
Independent	H. Woodcock	13	0.5	+0.5
Majority		549	19.8	+6.0
Turnout		2,768		
Liberal Democrats hold		Swing	+3.0	

=== Blackley ===
Blackley
Party	Candidate	Votes	%	±%
Labour	Eileen Kelly*	1,953	76.5	+1.6
Conservative	A. Slack	307	12.0	−1.3
Liberal Democrats	Peter Matthews	246	9.6	−2.2
Independent	Cath Hall	46	1.8	+1.8
Majority		1,646	64.5	+2.9
Turnout		2,552		
Labour hold		Swing	+1.4	

=== Bradford ===
Bradford
Party	Candidate	Votes	%	±%
Labour	Margaret Smith*	1,408	70.3	−1.5
Liberal Democrats	Peter Fairhurst	417	20.8	+1.1
Conservative	K. Hyde	119	5.9	−2.0
Green	Elaine Brown	58	2.9	+2.9
Majority		991	49.5	−2.6
Turnout		2,002		
Labour hold		Swing	-1.3	

=== Brooklands ===
Brooklands
Party	Candidate	Votes	%	±%
Labour	S. Calloway	1,783	67.1	+8.5
Conservative	Gladys Parry	564	21.2	−7.0
Liberal Democrats	Anthony McGarr	269	10.1	−3.1
Independent	P. Styles	42	1.6	+1.6
Majority		1,219	45.9	+15.6
Turnout		2,658		
Labour gain from Conservative		Swing	+7.7	

=== Burnage ===
Burnage
Party	Candidate	Votes	%	±%
Labour	Michael Green	2,260	71.6	+11.6
Liberal Democrats	J. Parkinson	464	14.7	−0.4
Conservative	Jeffrey Leach	353	11.2	−8.6
Independent	Z. Elford	78	2.5	−2.6
Majority		1,796	56.9	+16.7
Turnout		3,155		
Labour hold		Swing	+6.0	

=== Central ===
Central
Party	Candidate	Votes	%	±%
Labour	Patricia Conquest*	1,296	82.1	+4.4
Liberal Democrats	L. Dunn	110	7.0	−6.3
Conservative	A. Keller	108	6.8	−2.3
Independent	P. Lawrence	50	3.2	+3.2
Independent	C. Morris	15	0.9	+0.9
Majority		1,186	75.1	+10.7
Turnout		1,579		
Labour hold		Swing	+5.3	

=== Charlestown ===
Charlestown
Party	Candidate	Votes	%	±%
Labour	Eric Hobin	1,873	76.4	+5.3
Conservative	Christine Saunders	320	13.1	−2.5
Liberal Democrats	Robert West	212	8.7	−4.6
Independent	J. Miller	45	1.8	+1.8
Majority		1,553	63.4	+8.0
Turnout		2,450		
Labour hold		Swing	+3.9	

=== Cheetham ===
Cheetham
Party	Candidate	Votes	%	±%
Labour	John McGuinness	1,806	78.4	−1.1
Conservative	Rodney Keller	166	7.2	−2.8
Liberal	Richard Wilson	129	5.6	+5.6
Liberal Democrats	Richard Clayton	106	4.6	−5.9
Independent	George Taylor	69	3.0	+3.0
Green	D. Wild	27	1.2	+1.2
Majority		1,640	71.2	+2.3
Turnout		2,303		
Labour hold		Swing	+0.8	

=== Chorlton ===
Chorlton
Party	Candidate	Votes	%	±%
Labour	Valerie Stevens	2,903	67.9	+9.0
Conservative	Jonathan Smith	651	15.2	−4.7
Liberal Democrats	Helen Fisher	440	10.3	−3.6
Green	Brian Candeland	279	6.5	−0.8
Majority		2,252	52.7	+13.6
Turnout		4,273		
Labour hold		Swing	+6.8	

=== Crumpsall ===
Crumpsall
Party	Candidate	Votes	%	±%
Labour	Val Edwards*	2,079	74.6	+9.9
Conservative	Gregory Skorsewski	389	14.0	−5.8
Liberal Democrats	J. Spurway	248	8.9	−6.5
Independent	Melanie Jarman	71	2.5	+2.5
Majority		1,690	60.6	+15.7
Turnout		2,787		
Labour hold		Swing	+7.8	

=== Didsbury ===
Didsbury
Party	Candidate	Votes	%	±%
Labour	Richard Masztalerz	2,179	43.4	+3.3
Conservative	William Aikman*	1,452	28.9	−3.0
Liberal Democrats	J. Lawley	1,323	26.3	+0.5
Independent	P. Howell	71	1.4	+1.4
Majority		727	14.5	+6.3
Turnout		5,025		
Labour gain from Conservative		Swing	+3.1	

=== Fallowfield ===
Fallowfield
Party	Candidate	Votes	%	±%
Labour	Bernice Reid	1,519	57.9	−5.7
Labour	David Royle	1,462		
Conservative	Simon Davenport	314	12.0	−2.8
Liberal Democrats	Robert Harrison	277	10.6	−2.2
Green	Micheal Daw	277	10.6	+5.9
Conservative	P. Newlove	268		
Independent	E. Fiander	234	8.9	+8.0
Liberal Democrats	Howard Totty	234		
Independent	P. Williamson	114		
Majority		1,205	45.9	−2.9
Turnout		2,621		
Labour hold		Swing		
Labour hold		Swing	-1.4	

=== Gorton North ===
Gorton North
Party	Candidate	Votes	%	±%
Liberal Democrats	Jackie Pearcey*	1,865	51.0	−0.4
Labour	Colin Brierley	1,626	44.5	+1.7
Conservative	Paul Davies	123	3.4	−0.9
Independent	A. Cooper	43	1.2	+1.2
Majority		239	6.5	−2.1
Turnout		3,657		
Liberal Democrats hold		Swing	-1.0	

=== Gorton South ===
Gorton South
Party	Candidate	Votes	%	±%
Liberal Democrats	James Ashley*	1,494	49.7	−4.1
Labour	B. Whitehead	1,393	46.3	+5.6
Conservative	D. Davenport	91	3.0	−0.7
Independent	C. Walsh	31	1.0	+1.0
Majority		101	3.4	−9.7
Turnout		3,009		
Liberal Democrats hold		Swing	-4.8	

=== Harpurhey ===
Harpurhey
Party	Candidate	Votes	%	±%
Labour	Nilofar Siddiqi*	1,237	69.4	+0.8
Liberal Democrats	B. Kerrigan	341	19.1	−1.7
Conservative	Vivienne Clarke	205	11.5	+1.0
Majority		896	50.3	+2.5
Turnout		1,783		
Labour hold		Swing	+1.2	

=== Hulme ===
Hulme
Party	Candidate	Votes	%	±%
Labour	Peter Dungey*	832	79.3	+8.6
Conservative	Paul Kierman	62	5.9	−3.0
Liberal Democrats	A. Rogers	58	5.5	−4.2
Independent	A. Jones	39	3.7	+3.7
Independent	Rachel Harper	36	3.4	+3.4
Independent	Charles Lyn-Lloyd	22	2.1	+2.1
Majority		770	73.4	+13.4
Turnout		1,049		
Labour hold		Swing	+5.8	

=== Levenshulme ===
Levenshulme
Party	Candidate	Votes	%	±%
Liberal Democrats	Maria Rowles*	2,050	57.9	−3.3
Labour	Christopher Lowe	1,236	34.9	+4.4
Conservative	S. Peel	135	3.8	−0.7
Independent	K. Harkavy	87	2.5	+2.5
Natural Law	P. Mitchell	19	0.5	+0.5
Independent	D. Delange	16	0.5	+0.5
Majority		814	23.0	−7.7
Turnout		3,543		
Liberal Democrats hold		Swing	-3.8	

=== Lightbowne ===
Lightbowne
Party	Candidate	Votes	%	±%
Labour	Cath Inchbold*	1,853	73.8	−1.4
Conservative	Henry Coombes	344	13.7	+0.7
Liberal Democrats	David Gordon	242	9.6	−2.2
Green	A. Salter	73	2.9	+2.9
Majority		1,509	60.1	−2.1
Turnout		2,512		
Labour hold		Swing	-1.0	

=== Longsight ===
Longsight
Party	Candidate	Votes	%	±%
Labour	Ken Strath*	1,922	57.5	−11.1
Conservative	Muhammed Naqui	890	26.6	+13.6
Green	Spencer Fitzgibbon	275	8.2	+3.9
Liberal Democrats	M. Dunn	257	7.7	−5.3
Majority		1,032	30.9	−24.7
Turnout		3,344		
Labour hold		Swing	-12.3	

=== Moss Side ===
Moss Side
Party	Candidate	Votes	%	±%
Labour	Claire Nangle*	1,701	76.2	−2.5
Conservative	Mary Barnes	183	8.2	+1.3
Green	C. Collis	152	6.8	+0.3
Liberal Democrats	Lauriston Ford	117	5.2	−2.8
Independent	M. Miller	80	3.6	+3.6
Majority		1,518	68.0	−2.7
Turnout		2,233		
Labour hold		Swing	-1.9	

=== Moston ===
Moston
Party	Candidate	Votes	%	±%
Labour	Henry Cooper*	2,444	76.1	+5.8
Conservative	Dorothy Keller	463	14.4	−2.0
Liberal Democrats	Vera Towers	270	8.4	−4.9
Independent	J. Bird	33	1.0	+1.0
Majority		1,981	61.7	+7.8
Turnout		3,210		
Labour hold		Swing	+3.9	

=== Newton Heath ===
Newton Heath
Party	Candidate	Votes	%	±%
Labour	Damien O'Connor	1,867	83.0	+9.5
Conservative	E. Fisher	212	9.4	−3.7
Liberal Democrats	C. Turner	140	6.2	−7.2
Independent	H. Routh	31	1.4	+1.4
Majority		1,655	73.6	+13.5
Turnout		2,250		
Labour hold		Swing	+6.6	

=== Northenden ===
Northenden
Party	Candidate	Votes	%	±%
Labour	Mike Kane*	2,190	69.9	+2.7
Conservative	K. McKenna	487	15.5	−4.1
Liberal Democrats	Kenneth Lightowler	392	12.5	−0.8
Independent	Lance Crookes	66	2.1	+2.1
Majority		1,703	54.3	+6.7
Turnout		3,135		
Labour hold		Swing	+3.4	

=== Old Moat ===
Old Moat
Party	Candidate	Votes	%	±%
Labour	Arnold Spencer*	2,325	70.8	+14.0
Liberal Democrats	Yasmen Zalzala	422	12.9	−7.8
Conservative	Graham Betton	381	11.6	−0.6
Green	Teresa Romagnuolo	154	4.7	+0.5
Majority		1,903	58.0	+21.9
Turnout		3,282		
Labour hold		Swing	+10.9	

=== Rusholme ===
Rusholme
Party	Candidate	Votes	%	±%
Labour	Jawaid Chaudhry	1,270	42.5	+3.2
Liberal Democrats	Marc Ramsbottom	1,014	33.9	−1.8
Independent Labour	Margaret Manning*	371	12.4	+12.4
Independent	Micheal Robinson	248	8.3	+5.4
Conservative	R. Norris	86	2.9	−12.3
Majority		256	8.6	+5.0
Turnout		2,989		
Labour gain from Independent Labour		Swing	+2.5	

=== Sharston ===
Sharston
Party	Candidate	Votes	%	±%
Labour	Joyce Keller*	1,593	79.3	+9.0
Conservative	I. Hollins	201	10.0	−3.0
Liberal Democrats	Cath Hall	179	8.9	−3.1
Independent	R. Garside	36	1.8	+1.8
Majority		1,392	69.3	+12.0
Turnout		2,009		
Labour hold		Swing	+6.0	

=== Whalley Range ===
Whalley Range
Party	Candidate	Votes	%	±%
Labour	Dorothy Rathbone	1,901	55.7	−6.5
Conservative	John Kershaw	964	28.3	+9.1
Liberal Democrats	John Leech	392	11.5	−5.5
Green	Bruce Bingham	154	4.5	+4.5
Majority		937	27.5	−15.5
Turnout		3,411		
Labour hold		Swing	-7.8	

=== Withington ===
Withington
Party	Candidate	Votes	%	±%
Labour	Andrew Simcock	1,816	44.4	+5.1
Liberal Democrats	David Sandiford*	1,760	43.1	−6.1
Conservative	J. Callaghan	350	8.6	+1.0
Green	Bernard Ekbery	162	4.0	+0.0
Majority		56	1.4	−8.4
Turnout		4,088		
Labour gain from Liberal Democrats		Swing	+5.6	

=== Woodhouse Park ===
Woodhouse Park
Party	Candidate	Votes	%	±%
Labour	Brian O'Neil	1,644	81.5	+13.1
Liberal Democrats	William Fisher	372	18.5	−4.3
Majority		1,272	63.1	+17.6
Turnout		2,016		
Labour hold		Swing	+8.7	

== By-elections between 1995 and 1996 ==
Moston By-Election 27 July 1995
Party	Candidate	Votes	%	±%
Labour	Patrick Mullin	1,445	69.0	−7.1
Liberal Democrats	Patrick Leech	381	18.2	+9.8
Conservative	Gregory Skorsewski	267	12.7	−1.7
Majority		1,064	50.8	−10.9
Turnout		2,093		
Labour hold		Swing	-8.4	
