= 1994 Manchester City Council election =

1994 UK local government election

- 5 May 1994

33 of 99 seats to Manchester City Council 50 seats needed for a majority
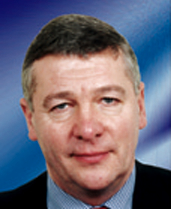
	First party	Second party	Third party
Leader	Graham Stringer	Keith Whitmore	Peter Hilton
Party	Labour	Liberal Democrats	Conservative
Leader's seat	Harpurhey	Levenshulme	Didsbury
Last election	27 seats, 48.9%	5 seats, 18.8%	2 seats, 29.1%
Seats before	78	14	5
Seats won	28	5	0
Seats after	78	16	4
Seat change	Steady	▲2	▼1
Popular vote	61,037	24,726	13,962
Percentage	59.2%	24.0%	13.5%
Swing	▲10.3%	▲5.2%	▼15.6%
	Fourth party
Leader	Margaret Manning
Party	Independent Labour
Leader's seat	Rusholme
Last election	0 seats, 0.3%
Seats before	2
Seats won	0
Seats after	1
Seat change	▼1
Popular vote	196
Percentage	0.2%
Swing	▼0.1%
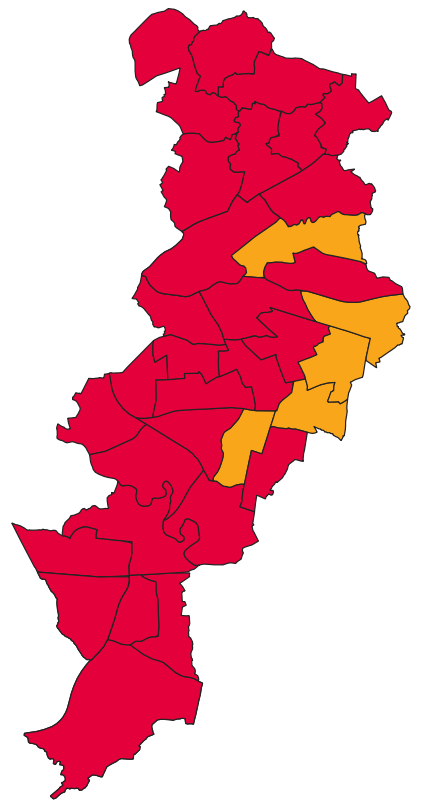
- Map of results of 1994 election
Leader of the Council before election
Graham Stringer
Labour
Leader of the Council after election
Graham Stringer
Labour

Elections to Manchester City Council were held on Thursday, 5 May 1994. One third of the council was up for election, with each successful candidate to serve a four-year term of office, expiring in 1998. The Labour Party retained overall control of the council.

== Election result ==
Party	Votes		Seats			Full Council	
Labour Party	61,037 (59.2%)	▲10.3	28 (82.3%)	28 / 33	Steady	78 (78.8%)	78 / 99
Liberal Democrats	24,726 (24.0%)	▲5.2	5 (14.7%)	5 / 33	▲2	16 (16.2%)	16 / 99
Conservative Party	13,962 (13.5%)	▼15.6	0 (0.0%)	0 / 33	▼1	4 (4.0%)	4 / 99
Independent Labour	196 (0.2%)	▼0.1	0 (0.0%)	0 / 33	▼1	1 (1.0%)	1 / 99
Green Party	2,004 (1.9%)	▼1.0	0 (0.0%)	0 / 33	Steady	0 (0.0%)	0 / 99
Independent	809 (0.8%)	N/A	0 (0.0%)	0 / 33	N/A	0 (0.0%)	0 / 99
Communist (ML)	294 (0.3%)	N/A	0 (0.0%)	0 / 33	N/A	0 (0.0%)	0 / 99

↓
1	78	16	4

== Ward results ==
=== Ardwick ===
Ardwick
Party	Candidate	Votes	%	±%
Labour	L. Murphy	1,231	75.2	+2.6
Liberal Democrats	L. Ford	296	18.1	+9.8
Conservative	F. Roche	109	6.7	−8.1
Majority		935	57.2	−0.6
Turnout		1,636		
Labour hold		Swing	-3.6	

=== Baguley ===
Baguley
Party	Candidate	Votes	%	±%
Labour	T. Farrell	1,949	71.8	+18.5
Conservative	P. Fitzsimons	411	15.1	−22.7
Liberal Democrats	G. Hall	353	13.0	+6.0
Majority		1,538	56.7	+41.2
Turnout		2,713		
Labour hold		Swing	+20.6	

=== Barlow Moor ===
Barlow Moor
Party	Candidate	Votes	%	±%
Labour	A. Maloney*	1,762	48.5	+15.2
Liberal Democrats	R. Harrison	1,394	38.4	−10.1
Conservative	D. Smith	301	8.3	−6.1
Green	R. Goater	174	4.8	+1.1
Majority		368	10.1	−5.1
Turnout		3,631		
Labour hold		Swing	+12.6	

=== Benchill ===
Benchill
Party	Candidate	Votes	%	±%
Labour	A. Harding	1,620	71.1	+3.3
Communist (ML)	L. Worthington	294	12.9	+12.9
Liberal Democrats	J. Redmond	228	10.0	−0.7
Conservative	M. Joyce	138	6.1	−15.4
Majority		1,326	58.2	+11.9
Turnout		2,280		
Labour hold		Swing	-4.8	

=== Beswick and Clayton ===
Beswick and Clayton
Party	Candidate	Votes	%	±%
Liberal Democrats	M. Dunican	1,652	55.3	+35.2
Labour	W. Egerton*	1,240	41.5	−21.6
Conservative	D. Russell	95	3.2	−13.6
Majority		412	13.8	−29.2
Turnout		2,987		
Liberal Democrats gain from Labour		Swing	+28.4	

=== Blackley ===
Blackley
Party	Candidate	Votes	%	±%
Labour	G. Chadwick*	2,144	74.9	+20.5
Conservative	V. Clarke	380	13.3	−21.8
Liberal Democrats	K. Wadsworth	339	11.8	+1.2
Majority		1,764	61.6	+42.3
Turnout		2,863		
Labour hold		Swing	+21.1	

=== Bradford ===
Bradford
Party	Candidate	Votes	%	±%
Labour	J. Gilmore*	1,576	71.8	+8.9
Liberal Democrats	P. Fairhurst	432	19.7	+9.4
Conservative	K. Hyde	173	7.9	−15.8
Independent	C. Morris	15	0.7	+0.7
Majority		1,144	52.1	+12.8
Turnout		2,196		
Labour hold		Swing	-0.2	

=== Brooklands ===
Brooklands
Party	Candidate	Votes	%	±%
Labour	G. Evans	1,817	58.6	+20.5
Conservative	A. Langan	876	28.2	−26.1
Liberal Democrats	H. McKay	410	13.2	+7.7
Majority		941	30.3	+14.1
Turnout		3,103		
Labour hold		Swing	+23.3	

=== Burnage ===
Burnage
Party	Candidate	Votes	%	±%
Labour	M. Taylor	2,308	60.0	+17.0
Conservative	J. Leach	761	19.8	−20.7
Liberal Democrats	J. Lawley	581	15.1	+1.9
Independent Labour	R. Whyte*	196	5.1	+5.1
Majority		1,547	40.2	+37.2
Turnout		3,846		
Labour gain from Independent Labour		Swing	+18.8	

=== Central ===
Central
Party	Candidate	Votes	%	±%
Labour	T. Findlow*	1,276	77.7	+5.2
Liberal Democrats	L. Jarrett	218	13.3	+4.2
Conservative	W. Bradshaw	149	9.1	−5.0
Majority		1,058	64.4	+6.0
Turnout		1,643		
Labour hold		Swing	+0.5	

=== Charlestown ===
Charlestown
Party	Candidate	Votes	%	±%
Labour	E. Curley*	2,049	71.1	+17.6
Conservative	C. Saunders	451	15.6	−21.3
Liberal Democrats	J. Parkinson	382	13.3	+3.7
Majority		1,598	55.4	+38.8
Turnout		2,882		
Labour hold		Swing	+19.4	

=== Cheetham ===
Cheetham
Party	Candidate	Votes	%	±%
Labour	M. Pagel*	1,904	79.5	+10.7
Liberal Democrats	R. Clayton	252	10.5	−1.2
Conservative	M. Gifford	240	10.0	−9.4
Majority		1,652	68.9	+19.5
Turnout		2,396		
Labour hold		Swing	+5.9	

=== Chorlton ===
Chorlton
Party	Candidate	Votes	%	±%
Labour	B. Selby*	2,722	58.9	+8.2
Conservative	J. Smith	917	19.9	−15.6
Liberal Democrats	B. Pierce	643	13.9	+6.8
Green	B. Candeland	337	7.3	+0.6
Majority		1,805	39.1	+23.8
Turnout		4,619		
Labour hold		Swing	+11.9	

=== Crumpsall ===
Crumpsall
Party	Candidate	Votes	%	±%
Labour	A. Spinks*	2,062	64.7	+12.7
Conservative	G. Mellyng	631	19.8	−20.6
Liberal Democrats	P. Matthews	492	15.4	+7.8
Majority		1,431	44.9	+33.3
Turnout		3,185		
Labour hold		Swing	+16.6	

=== Didsbury ===
Didsbury
Party	Candidate	Votes	%	±%
Labour	G. Bridson	2,319	40.1	+8.4
Conservative	J. Hill*	1,844	31.9	−18.3
Liberal Democrats	J. Lawley	1,494	25.8	+10.3
Green	B. Doherty	125	2.2	−0.4
Majority		475	8.2	−10.3
Turnout		5,782		
Labour gain from Conservative		Swing	+13.3	

=== Fallowfield ===
Fallowfield
Party	Candidate	Votes	%	±%
Labour	P. Morrison*	1,824	63.6	+7.4
Conservative	J. Nelson	425	14.8	−12.2
Liberal Democrats	S. Ord	367	12.8	−4.2
Green	M. Daw	134	4.7	+4.7
Independent	S. King	92	3.2	+3.2
Independent	A. Fiander	27	0.9	+0.9
Majority		1,399	48.8	+19.6
Turnout		2,869		
Labour hold		Swing	+9.8	

=== Gorton North ===
Gorton North
Party	Candidate	Votes	%	±%
Liberal Democrats	W. Helsby	2,054	51.4	+0.9
Labour	C. Brierley*	1,712	42.8	+2.6
Conservative	P. Davies	170	4.3	−3.7
Green	D. Wild	61	1.5	+0.2
Majority		342	8.6	−1.7
Turnout		3,997		
Liberal Democrats gain from Labour		Swing	-0.8	

=== Gorton South ===
Gorton South
Party	Candidate	Votes	%	±%
Liberal Democrats	J. Bridges*	1,918	53.8	+4.3
Labour	B. Whitehead	1,451	40.7	−1.5
Conservative	D. Davenport	132	3.7	−2.3
Green	A. Salter	66	1.9	−0.4
Majority		467	13.1	+5.9
Turnout		3,567		
Liberal Democrats hold		Swing	+1.4	

=== Harpurhey ===
Harpurhey
Party	Candidate	Votes	%	±%
Labour	Patrick Karney*	1,497	68.6	+14.7
Liberal Democrats	D. Thame	454	20.8	+11.5
Conservative	J. Samson	230	10.5	−13.4
Majority		1,043	47.8	+17.8
Turnout		2,181		
Labour hold		Swing	+1.6	

=== Hulme ===
Hulme
Party	Candidate	Votes	%	±%
Labour	D. Lunts	938	70.7	+2.4
Independent	C. Osigwe	142	10.7	+10.7
Liberal Democrats	S. Oliver	128	9.7	+1.9
Conservative	J. Baker	118	8.9	−4.5
Majority		796	60.0	+5.1
Turnout		1,326		
Labour hold		Swing	-4.1	

=== Levenshulme ===
Levenshulme
Party	Candidate	Votes	%	±%
Liberal Democrats	Keith Whitmore*	2,529	61.2	+4.6
Labour	H. Pare	1,261	30.5	+3.0
Conservative	R. West	188	4.5	−6.5
Green	P. Thompson	154	3.7	−1.3
Majority		1,268	30.7	+1.7
Turnout		4,132		
Liberal Democrats hold		Swing	+0.8	

=== Lightbowne ===
Lightbowne
Party	Candidate	Votes	%	±%
Labour	K. Franklin*	2,395	75.2	+16.8
Conservative	M. Steadman	413	13.0	−18.7
Liberal Democrats	D. Gordon	376	11.8	+2.0
Majority		1,982	62.2	+35.5
Turnout		3,184		
Labour hold		Swing	+17.7	

=== Longsight ===
Longsight
Party	Candidate	Votes	%	±%
Labour	N. Moghal*	2,334	68.6	+14.6
Liberal Democrats	M. Dunn	443	13.0	+4.4
Conservative	D. Carroll	442	13.0	−18.5
Green	S. Fitzgibbon	146	4.3	−1.6
Independent	T. Rigby	36	1.1	+1.1
Majority		1,891	55.6	+33.1
Turnout		3,401		
Labour hold		Swing	+5.1	

=== Moss Side ===
Moss Side
Party	Candidate	Votes	%	±%
Labour	V. Cunningham	2,005	78.7	+4.3
Liberal Democrats	W. Tew	204	8.0	−9.2
Conservative	M. Barnes	175	6.9	+6.9
Green	K. Molteno	165	6.5	−1.8
Majority		1,801	70.7	+13.5
Turnout		2,549		
Labour hold		Swing	+6.7	

=== Moston ===
Moston
Party	Candidate	Votes	%	±%
Labour	D. Shaw*	2,406	70.3	+19.9
Conservative	J. Bradshaw	562	16.4	−24.9
Liberal Democrats	V. Towers	455	13.3	+5.0
Majority		1,844	53.9	+44.9
Turnout		3,423		
Labour hold		Swing	+22.4	

=== Newton Heath ===
Newton Heath
Party	Candidate	Votes	%	±%
Labour	A. Garside*	1,655	73.5	+9.9
Liberal Democrats	C. Turner	302	13.4	+2.8
Conservative	P. Leach	294	13.1	−12.8
Majority		1,353	60.1	+22.4
Turnout		2,251		
Labour hold		Swing	+3.5	

=== Northenden ===
Northenden
Party	Candidate	Votes	%	±%
Labour	G. Carroll*	2,490	67.2	+17.3
Conservative	K. McKenna	725	19.6	−21.4
Liberal Democrats	M. Ford	493	13.3	+6.4
Majority		1,765	47.6	+38.8
Turnout		3,708		
Labour hold		Swing	+19.3	

=== Old Moat ===
Old Moat
Party	Candidate	Votes	%	±%
Labour	A. Fender*	2,319	56.8	+5.5
Liberal Democrats	Y. Zalzala	845	20.7	+8.1
Conservative	K. Hussain	497	12.2	−18.5
Independent	M. Robinson	250	6.1	+6.1
Green	T. Romagnuolo	170	4.2	−1.2
Majority		1,474	36.1	+15.6
Turnout		4,081		
Labour hold		Swing	-1.3	

=== Rusholme ===
Rusholme
Party	Candidate	Votes	%	±%
Labour	J. Byrne*	1,451	39.3	−4.2
Liberal Democrats	M. Ramsbottom	1,318	35.7	+4.2
Conservative	M. Naqui	561	15.2	−2.3
Green	B. Bingham	178	4.8	−2.8
Independent	K. Robinson	107	2.9	+2.9
Independent	I. Ferguson	81	2.2	+2.2
Majority		133	3.6	−8.4
Turnout		3,696		
Labour hold		Swing	-4.2	

=== Sharston ===
Sharston
Party	Candidate	Votes	%	±%
Labour	H. Barrett	1,680	70.3	+23.0
Conservative	I. Hollins	310	13.0	−25.8
Liberal Democrats	W. Fisher	286	12.0	+2.3
Green	G. Lawson	114	4.8	+0.5
Majority		1,370	57.3	+48.5
Turnout		2,390		
Labour hold		Swing	+24.4	

=== Whalley Range ===
Whalley Range
Party	Candidate	Votes	%	±%
Labour	B. Stone	2,248	62.2	+12.5
Conservative	R. Ignatowicz	694	19.2	−21.8
Liberal Democrats	J. Leech	615	17.0	+10.7
Independent	R. Harper	59	1.6	+1.6
Majority		1,554	43.0	+34.3
Turnout		3,616		
Labour hold		Swing	+17.1	

=== Withington ===
Withington
Party	Candidate	Votes	%	±%
Liberal Democrats	A. Jones*	2,238	49.2	+4.7
Labour	A. Simcock	1,791	39.3	+10.1
Conservative	C. Brown	344	7.6	−13.3
Green	B. Ekbery	180	4.0	−1.4
Majority		447	9.8	−5.5
Turnout		4,553		
Liberal Democrats hold		Swing	-2.7	

=== Woodhouse Park ===
Woodhouse Park
Party	Candidate	Votes	%	±%
Labour	A. Ryan	1,601	68.4	+14.5
Liberal Democrats	W. Ford	535	22.8	+3.3
Conservative	M. Coban	206	8.8	−17.8
Majority		1,066	45.5	+18.2
Turnout		2,342		
Labour hold		Swing	+5.6	
