= 1998 Manchester City Council election =

1998 UK local government election

- 7 May 1998

35 of 99 seats to Manchester City Council 50 seats needed for a majority
	First party	Second party
Leader	Richard Leese	Simon Ashley
Party	Labour	Liberal Democrats
Leader's seat	Crumpsall	Gorton South
Last election	29 seats, 60.1%	6 seats, 22.0%
Seats before	84	15
Seats won	30	5
Seats after	84	15
Seat change	Steady	Steady
Popular vote	34,027	18,294
Percentage	52.9%	28.5%
Swing	▼7.2%	▲6.5%
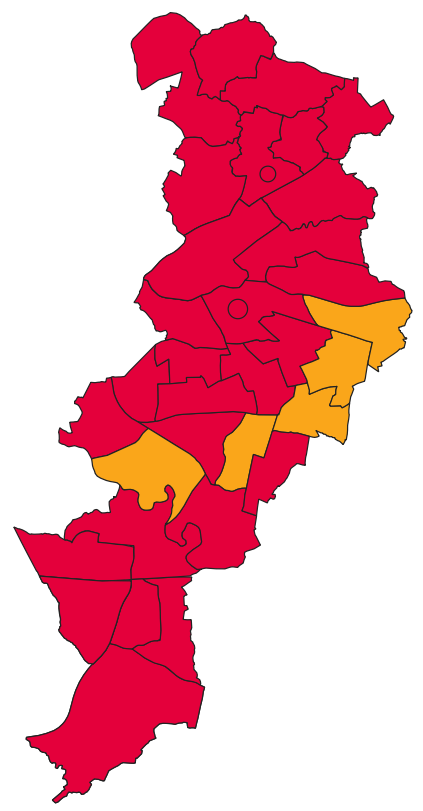
- Map of results of 1998 election
Leader of the Council before election
Richard Leese
Labour
Leader of the Council after election
Richard Leese
Labour

Elections to Manchester City Council were held on Thursday, 7 May 1998. One third of the council was up for election, with each successful candidate to serve a four-year term of office, expiring in 2002. A vacancy each in Ardwick and Harpurhey were also being contested. There were two Labour candidates for Barlow Moor ward, the result of de-selected Labour Councillor Arthur Maloney securing an official Labour Party nomination before he was replaced by a new candidate. The Independent Labour candidates stood as Labour Peace 2000. Overall turnout was 20.5%, with Labour retaining control of the council.

== Election result ==
Party	Votes		Seats			Full Council	
Labour Party	34,027 (52.9%)	▼7.2	30 (85.7%)	30 / 35	Steady	84 (84.8%)	84 / 99
Liberal Democrats	18,294 (28.5%)	▲6.5	5 (14.3%)	5 / 35	Steady	15 (15.2%)	15 / 99
Conservative Party	8,261 (12.8%)	▼0.2	0 (0.0%)	0 / 35	Steady	0 (0.0%)	0 / 99
Green Party	2,200 (3.4%)	▲0.5	0 (0.0%)	0 / 35	Steady	0 (0.0%)	0 / 99
Socialist Labour	997 (1.5%)	N/A	0 (0.0%)	0 / 35	N/A	0 (0.0%)	0 / 99
Independent Labour	319 (0.5%)	▲0.2	0 (0.0%)	0 / 35	Steady	0 (0.0%)	0 / 99
Independent	70 (0.1%)	▼0.2	0 (0.0%)	0 / 35	Steady	0 (0.0%)	0 / 99
Communist	47 (0.1%)	N/A	0 (0.0%)	0 / 35	N/A	0 (0.0%)	0 / 99
Socialist Alternative	32 (0.0%)	▼0.5	0 (0.0%)	0 / 35	Steady	0 (0.0%)	0 / 99
Independent Liberal	17 (0.0%)	Steady	0 (0.0%)	0 / 35	Steady	0 (0.0%)	0 / 99

↓
84	15

== Ward results ==
=== Ardwick ===
Ardwick (2 vacancies)
Party	Candidate	Votes	%	±%
Labour	Lawrence Murphy*	653	66.0	−10.5
Labour	Bernard Priest	577		
Liberal Democrats	Derek Maloney	118	11.9	+1.4
Liberal Democrats	David Gray	107		
Conservative	Fanny Davenport	106	10.7	+1.0
Conservative	John Davenport	97		
Green	Bruce Bingham	56	5.7	+2.4
Socialist Labour	Rachel Newton	56	5.7	+5.7
Majority		459	54.1	−12.0
Turnout		1,770		
Labour hold		Swing		
Labour hold		Swing	-5.9	

=== Baguley ===
Baguley
Party	Candidate	Votes	%	±%
Labour	Thomas Farrell*	1,044	69.8	−4.3
Conservative	Robert Caddick	291	19.5	+4.0
Liberal Democrats	Anthony McGarr	161	10.8	+3.1
Majority		753	50.3	−8.3
Turnout		1,496		
Labour hold		Swing	-4.1	

=== Barlow Moor ===
Barlow Moor
Party	Candidate	Votes	%	±%
Liberal Democrats	John Leech	1,671	57.8	+9.3
Labour	Jonathan Whitehead	779	26.9	−14.5
Labour	Arthur Maloney*	197	6.8	−34.6
Conservative	Thomas Bumby	178	6.2	−0.9
Socialist Labour	Margaret Manning	68	2.4	+2.4
Majority		892	30.8	+23.7
Turnout		2,893		
Liberal Democrats gain from Labour		Swing	+11.9	

=== Benchill ===
Benchill
Party	Candidate	Votes	%	±%
Labour	George Harding*	791	76.1	−1.6
Liberal Democrats	Janice Redmond	178	17.1	+7.8
Conservative	Anthony Green	70	6.7	−0.9
Majority		613	60.0	−8.4
Turnout		1,039		
Labour hold		Swing	-4.7	

=== Beswick and Clayton ===
Beswick and Clayton
Party	Candidate	Votes	%	±%
Labour	Andrew Harland	960	52.4	+6.3
Liberal Democrats	Martina Dunican*	805	44.0	−3.9
Conservative	Elena Stars	66	3.6	+0.6
Majority		155	8.5	+6.7
Turnout		1,831		
Labour gain from Liberal Democrats		Swing	+5.1	

=== Blackley ===
Blackley
Party	Candidate	Votes	%	±%
Labour	Harold Lyons*	1,043	68.4	+4.9
Conservative	Jacqueline Rowland	244	16.0	+3.0
Liberal Democrats	Peter Matthews	237	15.6	+4.8
Majority		799	52.4	+1.9
Turnout		1,524		
Labour hold		Swing	+0.9	

=== Bradford ===
Bradford
Party	Candidate	Votes	%	±%
Labour	Neil Swannick	759	58.4	−17.8
Liberal Democrats	Peter Fairhurst	449	34.5	+20.5
Conservative	Joyce Haydock	92	7.1	+0.6
Majority		310	23.8	−38.4
Turnout		1,300		
Labour hold		Swing	-19.1	

=== Brooklands ===
Brooklands
Party	Candidate	Votes	%	±%
Labour	Glynn Evans*	1,111	54.5	−1.9
Conservative	Ian Bradshaw	667	32.7	−0.2
Liberal Democrats	Bill Fisher	260	12.8	+3.9
Majority		444	21.8	−1.7
Turnout		2,038		
Labour hold		Swing	-0.8	

=== Burnage ===
Burnage
Party	Candidate	Votes	%	±%
Labour	Marilyn Taylor*	1,345	63.0	−3.8
Conservative	Jeffrey Leach	396	18.5	+3.4
Liberal Democrats	Robert Harrison	325	15.2	−0.6
Green	Jane Hutchins	70	3.3	+3.3
Majority		949	44.4	−6.6
Turnout		2,136		
Labour hold		Swing	-3.6	

=== Central ===
Central
Party	Candidate	Votes	%	±%
Labour	Thomas Findlow*	643	76.2	−1.5
Green	William Kearns	101	12.0	+10.3
Liberal Democrats	David Radcliffe	100	11.8	+3.1
Majority		542	64.2	−1.5
Turnout		844		
Labour hold		Swing	-5.9	

=== Charlestown ===
Charlestown
Party	Candidate	Votes	%	±%
Labour	Basil Curley*	1,083	65.4	−10.8
Liberal Democrats	Rodney Isherwood	322	19.5	+10.2
Conservative	Christine Saunders	260	15.7	+3.3
Majority		761	46.0	−17.8
Turnout		1,655		
Labour hold		Swing	-10.5	

=== Cheetham ===
Cheetham
Party	Candidate	Votes	%	±%
Labour	Martin Pagel*	1,153	46.7	−36.4
Liberal Democrats	Qassim Afzal	1,096	44.4	+38.0
Conservative	Dorothy Keller	176	7.1	+7.1
Independent	Ahmed Zubair	42	1.7	+1.7
Majority		57	2.3	−70.3
Turnout		2,467		
Labour hold		Swing	-37.2	

=== Chorlton ===
Chorlton
Party	Candidate	Votes	%	±%
Labour Co-op	Bernard Selby*	1,298	43.5	−24.6
Conservative	Malcolm Cleall-Hill	624	20.9	+3.0
Green	Julian Parry	404	13.5	+7.0
Liberal Democrats	Cath Hall	393	13.2	+5.7
Socialist Labour	Evan Pritchard	267	8.9	+8.9
Majority		674	22.6	−27.6
Turnout		2,986		
Labour hold		Swing	-13.8	

=== Crumpsall ===
Crumpsall
Party	Candidate	Votes	%	±%
Labour	Alan Spinks*	1,462	68.1	−6.1
Conservative	Nigel Dugmore	379	17.6	+2.2
Liberal Democrats	David Gordon	307	14.3	+6.5
Majority		1,083	50.4	−8.4
Turnout		2,148		
Labour hold		Swing	-4.1	

=== Didsbury ===
Didsbury
Party	Candidate	Votes	%	±%
Labour	Geoffrey Bridson*	1,700	43.5	+5.3
Conservative	Peter Hilton	1,051	26.9	−5.5
Liberal Democrats	David Sandiford	1,009	25.8	−2.3
Green	Tom McGahan	147	3.8	+3.8
Majority		649	16.6	+10.9
Turnout		3,907		
Labour hold		Swing	+5.4	

=== Fallowfield ===
Fallowfield
Party	Candidate	Votes	%	±%
Labour	Peter Morrison*	900	53.4	−16.5
Liberal Democrats	David Hennigan	267	15.8	+5.4
Conservative	Simon Davenport	265	15.7	+2.2
Independent Labour	Tommy Kelly	108	6.4	+6.4
Green	Micheal Daw	83	4.9	−1.4
Socialist Labour	Paul Hepburn	63	3.7	+3.7
Majority		633	37.5	−18.9
Turnout		1,686		
Labour hold		Swing	-10.9	

=== Gorton North ===
Gorton North
Party	Candidate	Votes	%	±%
Liberal Democrats	Wendy Helsby*	1,333	50.0	−2.2
Labour	James Battle	1,173	44.0	+1.4
Conservative	Albert Walsh	103	3.9	−0.6
Socialist Labour	Alan Wardlaw	55	2.1	+2.1
Majority		160	6.0	−3.6
Turnout		2,664		
Liberal Democrats hold		Swing	-1.8	

=== Gorton South ===
Gorton South
Party	Candidate	Votes	%	±%
Liberal Democrats	John Bridges*	1,347	60.8	+3.5
Labour	Christopher Lowe	705	31.8	−6.8
Conservative	Ann Hodkinson	75	3.4	+0.4
Green	Emma Hamilton	61	2.8	+1.7
Independent	James Piper	28	1.3	N/A
Majority		642	29.0	+10.3
Turnout		2,216		
Liberal Democrats hold		Swing	+5.1	

=== Harpurhey ===
Harpurhey
Party	Candidate	Votes	%	±%
Labour	Pat Karney*	804	63.8	−8.7
Labour	Joanne Green	761		
Liberal Democrats	Andrew Steele	300	23.8	+12.0
Liberal Democrats	Arthur Tozowonah	212		
Conservative	Joan Coombes	156	12.4	+3.2
Conservative	Henry Coombes	151		
Majority		461	40.0	−20.7
Turnout		1,260		
Labour hold		Swing		
Labour hold		Swing	-10.3	

=== Hulme ===
Hulme
Party	Candidate	Votes	%	±%
Labour	Mary Murphy*	508	63.4	−10.6
Green	Melanie Jarman	108	13.5	+5.7
Liberal Democrats	James Graham	88	11.0	+3.5
Conservative	Paul Kierman	62	7.7	+0.5
Communist	Steve Riley	18	2.2	+2.2
Independent Liberal	Charles Lyn-Lloyd	17	2.1	−1.3
Majority		400	49.9	−16.2
Turnout		801		
Labour hold		Swing	-8.1	

=== Levenshulme ===
Levenshulme
Party	Candidate	Votes	%	±%
Liberal Democrats	Keith Whitmore*	1,550	57.7	+0.5
Labour	Nicholas Macgregor	771	28.7	−5.7
Conservative	Paul Davies	148	5.5	+1.2
Socialist Labour	John Garratt	104	3.9	+3.9
Green	Simon Chislett	81	3.0	−0.2
Socialist	Andrew Pitts	32	1.2	+1.2
Majority		779	29.0	+6.3
Turnout		2,686		
Liberal Democrats hold		Swing	+3.1	

=== Lightbowne ===
Lightbowne
Party	Candidate	Votes	%	±%
Labour	Kenneth Franklin*	1,277	71.7	−4.1
Conservative	William Clapham	258	14.5	+0.9
Liberal Democrats	Samantha McCormick	247	13.9	+5.9
Majority		1,019	57.2	−5.0
Turnout		1,782		
Labour hold		Swing	-2.5	

=== Longsight ===
Longsight
Party	Candidate	Votes	%	±%
Labour	Razak Saeed	1,314	55.9	+9.0
Green	Spencer Fitzgibbon	360	15.3	+6.3
Liberal Democrats	Abu Chowdhury	278	11.8	−1.0
Conservative	Paul Mostyn	274	11.7	−12.6
Socialist Labour	Hilary Partridge	123	5.2	+5.2
Majority		954	40.6	+18.0
Turnout		2,349		
Labour hold		Swing	+1.3	

=== Moss Side ===
Moss Side
Party	Candidate	Votes	%	±%
Labour	Roy Walters	1,095	76.3	−3.2
Liberal Democrats	Doreen Dankyl	143	10.0	+2.3
Conservative	Mary Barnes	126	8.8	+1.2
Green	Teresa Romagnuolo	43	3.0	−2.3
Communist	John Pearson	29	2.0	+2.0
Majority		952	66.3	−5.5
Turnout		1,436		
Labour hold		Swing	-2.7	

=== Moston ===
Moston
Party	Candidate	Votes	%	±%
Labour	Derek Shaw*	1,248	64.6	−8.3
Conservative	Gregory Skorzewski	356	18.4	+3.2
Liberal Democrats	Joyce Laslett	327	16.9	+5.8
Majority		892	46.2	−11.5
Turnout		1,931		
Labour hold		Swing	-5.7	

=== Newton Heath ===
Newton Heath
Party	Candidate	Votes	%	±%
Labour	Mathis Smitheman	1,051	80.4	+0.2
Conservative	Raymond Wattenbach	132	10.1	−0.1
Liberal Democrats	Barbera McKay	124	9.5	+2.5
Majority		919	70.3	+0.2
Turnout		1,307		
Labour hold		Swing	+0.1	

=== Northenden ===
Northenden
Party	Candidate	Votes	%	±%
Labour	Richard Cowell	1,205	56.2	−12.8
Conservative	Richard West	394	18.4	+0.3
Green	Lance Crookes	324	15.1	+10.8
Liberal Democrats	Jeanette McKay	222	10.3	+1.7
Majority		811	37.8	−13.1
Turnout		2,145		
Labour hold		Swing	-6.5	

=== Old Moat ===
Old Moat
Party	Candidate	Votes	%	±%
Labour	Andrew Fender*	1,396	49.8	−17.2
Liberal Democrats	Yasmen Zalzala	1,031	36.8	+26.6
Conservative	Christopher Brown	213	7.6	−6.0
Green	Lucy Fogarty	163	5.8	−0.4
Majority		365	13.0	−40.4
Turnout		2,803		
Labour hold		Swing	-21.9	

=== Rusholme ===
Rusholme
Party	Candidate	Votes	%	±%
Labour	John Byrne*	945	43.6	−6.8
Liberal Democrats	Ray Atkins	693	32.0	+1.8
Independent Labour	Michael Robinson	211	9.7	+9.7
Conservative	Karen Abbad	197	9.1	−0.5
Green	Bernard Ekbery	74	3.4	+3.4
Socialist Labour	Trevor Wongsam	47	2.2	+2.2
Majority		252	11.6	−8.7
Turnout		2,167		
Labour hold		Swing	-4.3	

=== Sharston ===
Sharston
Party	Candidate	Votes	%	±%
Labour	Hugh Barrett*	910	73.4	−2.3
Liberal Democrats	Karen Farnen	196	15.8	+5.3
Conservative	George Stars	134	10.8	−0.1
Majority		776	62.6	−2.3
Turnout		1,240		
Labour hold		Swing	-3.8	

=== Whalley Range ===
Whalley Range
Party	Candidate	Votes	%	±%
Labour	Bernard Stone*	1,247	51.4	−8.8
Conservative	John Kershaw	516	21.3	−1.2
Liberal Democrats	Richard Powell	414	17.1	+5.5
Green	Mary Candeland	125	5.2	−0.4
Socialist Labour	Steven Wynn	124	5.1	+5.1
Majority		731	30.1	−34.5
Turnout		2,426		
Labour hold		Swing	-3.8	

=== Withington ===
Withington
Party	Candidate	Votes	%	±%
Liberal Democrats	Audrey Jones*	1,943	61.2	+8.0
Labour	Isobel Freeman	921	29.0	−8.3
Conservative	Muhammed Naqui	222	7.0	+0.9
Socialist Labour	Janice Whitehead	90	2.8	+2.8
Majority		1,022	32.2	+16.3
Turnout		3,176		
Liberal Democrats hold		Swing	+8.1	

=== Woodhouse Park ===
Woodhouse Park
Party	Candidate	Votes	%	±%
Labour	Paul Andrews*	936	72.2	+1.9
Liberal Democrats	Bill Ford	360	27.8	+16.4
Majority		576	44.4	−14.5
Turnout		1,296		
Labour hold		Swing	-7.2	

== By-elections between 1998 and 1999 ==
Cheetham By-Election 24 September 1998
Party	Candidate	Votes	%	±%
Liberal Democrats	Qassim Afzal	1,394	48.5	+4.1
Labour	Imran Rizvi	1,342	46.6	−0.1
Conservative	Dorothy Keller	141	4.9	−2.2
Majority		52	1.9	−0.4
Turnout		2,877		
Liberal Democrats gain from Labour		Swing	+2.1	
