= Keith Whitmore =

British politician

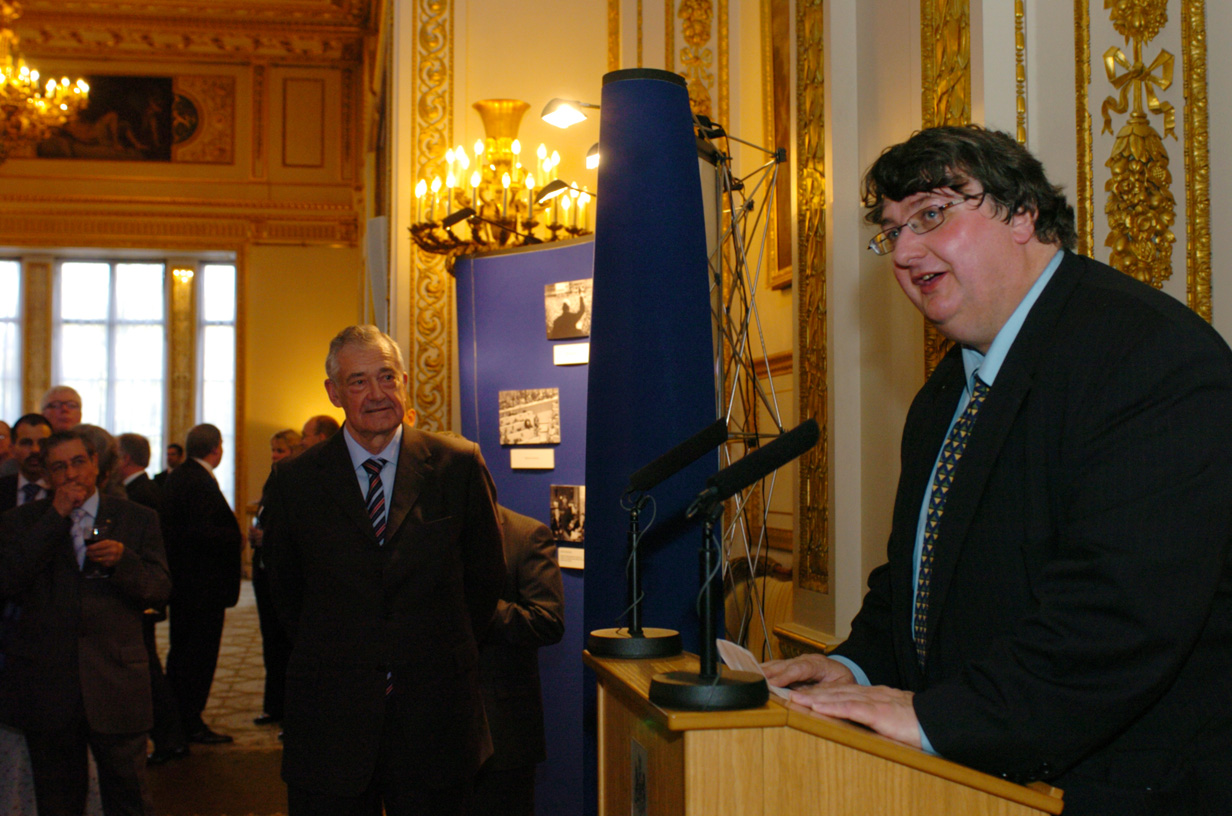
Whitmore in 2009

Keith Arthur Whitmore (born 15 June 1955) is a former British politician. He was a Liberal and later Liberal Democrat member of Manchester City Council for more than thirty years, retiring in 2012, and was also a member of the European Committee of the Regions and the Congress of the Council of Europe, of which he was President from 2010 to 2012.

He now chairs the Greater Manchester Transport Heritage Partnership and is active in other bodies with a similar focus.

== Early life ==
Keith Whitmore was born in 1955 in Manchester, the only child of Arthur Edmond Whitmore and Mavis J. Kretschmer.

== Manchester political career ==
Whitmore was first elected to Manchester City Council in May 1979 and remained a member until May 2012, representing the Levenshulme ward.

In 1983 and again at the 1987 general election, Whitmore unsuccessfully fought the Manchester Gorton constituency for the Liberal Party, a seat held by Labour’s Gerald Kaufman. From 1988 to 1997 he was leader of the Liberal Democrat Group on Manchester City Council.

From 1992 to 1998 Whitmore was a director of Manchester Airport, and for some years he was Deputy Chairman of the Greater Manchester Integrated Transport Authority (GMITA) and a Director of Greater Manchester Accessible Transport and the Manchester Museum of Transport. In 2009 he became Chairman of the GMITA and was the first Manchester councillor to hold that position. The Authority was merged into the Greater Manchester Combined Authority in 2011.

In December 2011 Whitmore was reported to be disillusioned with the Liberal Democrats, and he did not stand for re-election at the 2012 Manchester City Council election, at which his party lost all the seats it was defending.

== Council of Europe ==
In 1996, Whitmore was appointed as a member of the Congress of Local and Regional Authorities of the Council of Europe, based in Strasbourg. His party affiliation there was with the Independent and Liberal Democrat Group (ILDG), of which he became chairman in 2000.

Positions he held included Chairman of the Congress's Sustainable Development Committee, Chairman of the Institutional Committee, Vice-President of the Congress, and Head of the UK delegation to the Congress. On 26 October 2010 he was elected as President of the Congress and served in that capacity until his mandate ended in 2012.

Whitmore was also a member of the Committee of the Regions and of the Political Committee of the Council of European Municipalities and Regions (CEMR). In 2011–2012 he was acting chairman of the CEMR Governance Committee.

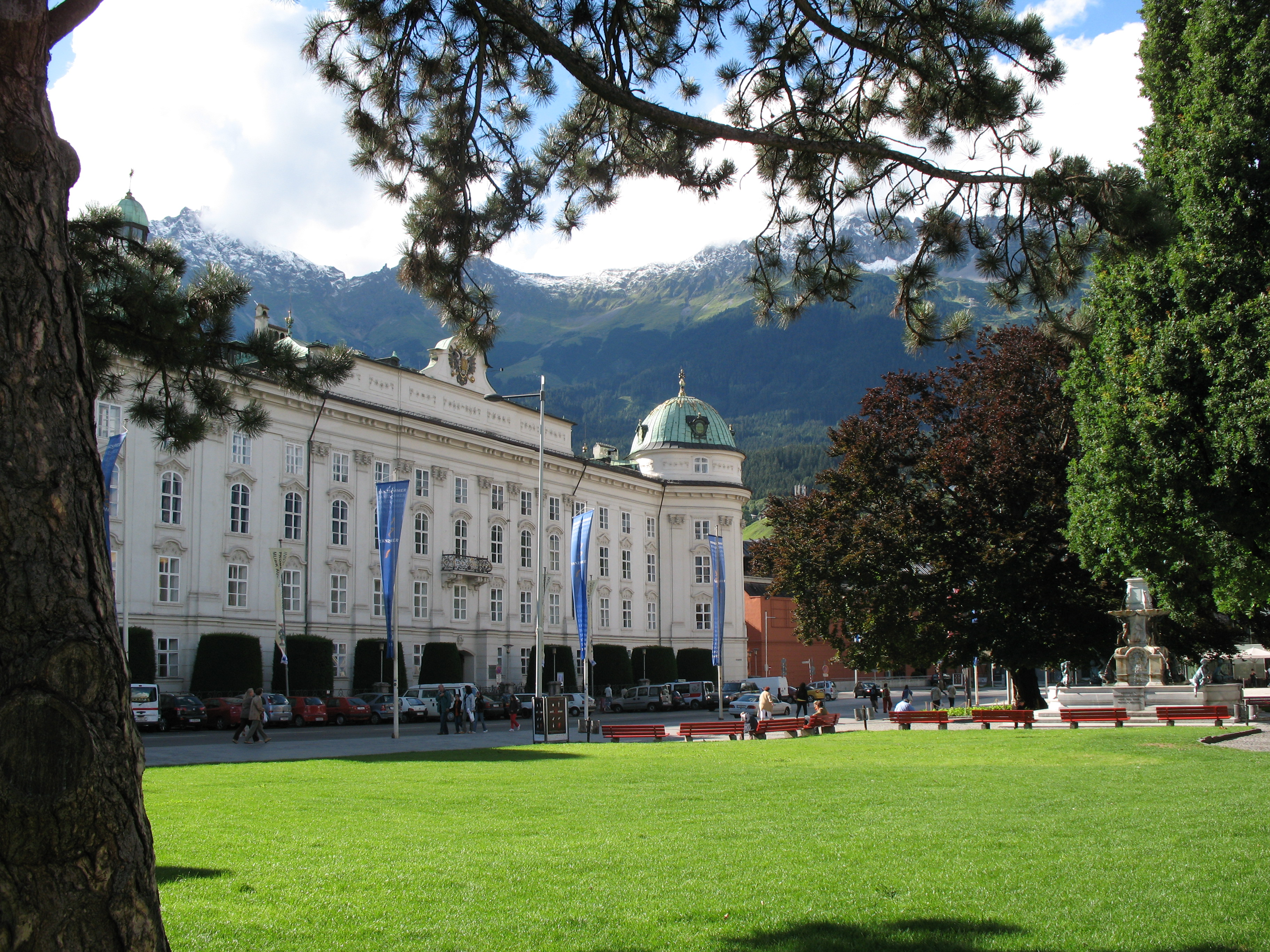
The Hofburg, Innsbruck

In 2012, Whitmore was awarded the Emperor-Maximilian-Prize for European Service, which he received at the Hofburg in Innsbruck, Austria, on 2 June 2012. A speech to explain the award was made by Herwig van Staa.

== Later life ==
In 2013 Whitmore was reported to be an honorary alderman of Manchester and chairman of the Heaton Park Tramway Trust. He remained in this position in 2015. Since 2012, he has chaired the Greater Manchester Transport Heritage Partnership.

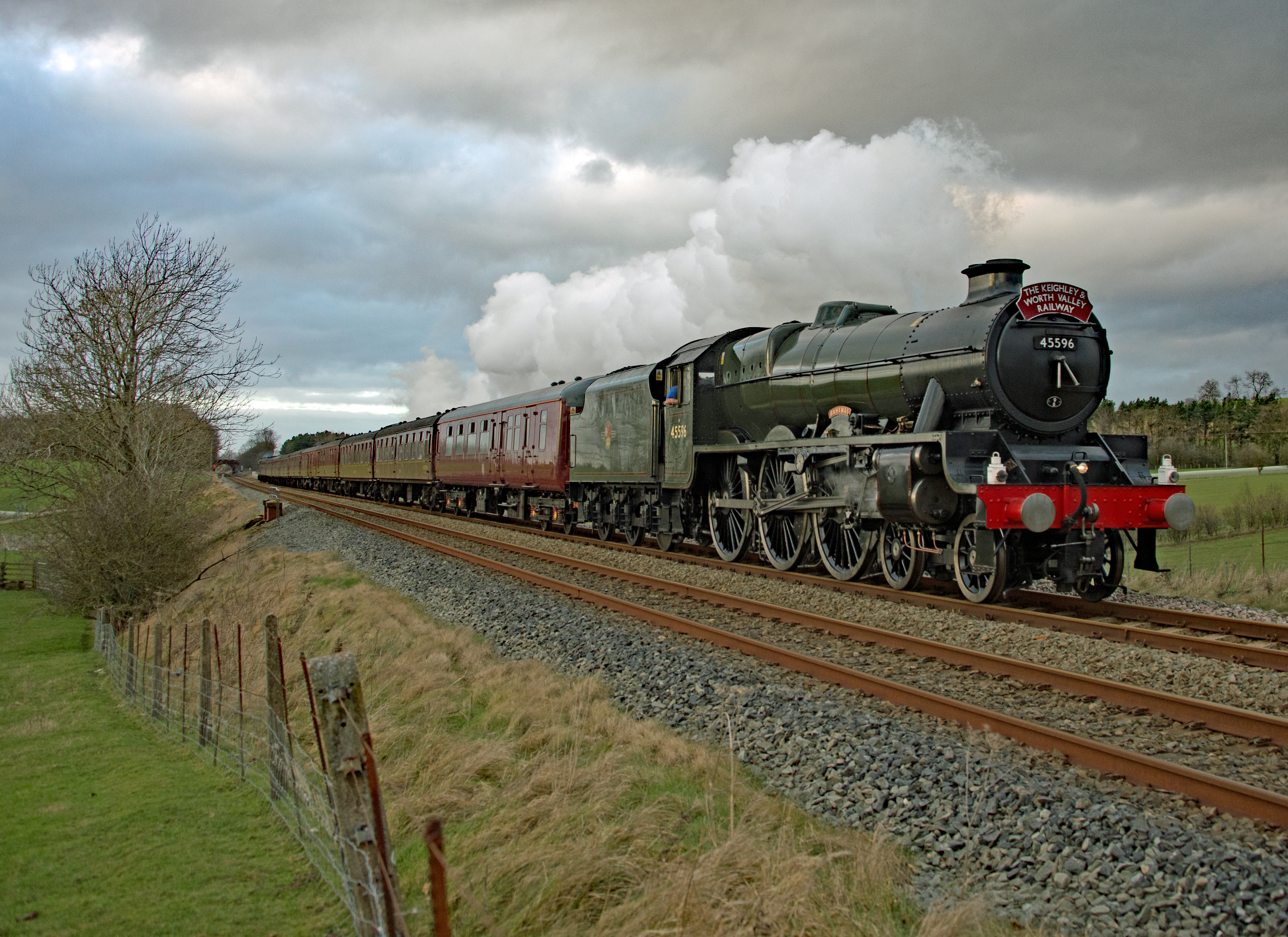
LMS Jubilee Class 5596 Bahamas

Whitmore has also been a director of the Manchester Tramway Company Ltd since 1990, of the Royal Exchange Theatre Company Ltd since 1995, of the People's History Museum (formerly the National Museum of Labour History, Manchester), since 2002, and of the Bahamas Locomotive Society of Wakefield since 2012. In 2018, he became chairman of the Bahamas Locomotive Society. In 2020, he was vice-president of the East Lancashire Railway.

== See also ==
- 1979 Manchester Council election
- 1982 Manchester Council election
- 1986 Manchester Council election
- 1990 Manchester Council election
- 1994 Manchester Council election
- 1998 Manchester Council election
- 2002 Manchester Council election
- 2004 Manchester Council election
- 2008 Manchester Council election
