= Tylecote family =

The surname Tylecote is an English family name, believed to be of Norman origin. The name took the form Talcott, Talcoat and Tayllcote through the sixteenth, seventeenth and eighteenth centuries.

Notable people with the name include:

- Andrew Tylecote (born 1946), British economist
- Edward Ferdinando Sutton Tylecote (1849–1938), English cricketer
- Frank Edward Tylecote (1879–1965), British doctor
- Mabel Tylecote (1896–1987), British politician and educationist
- Ronald F. Tylecote (1916–1990), British archaeologist and metallurgist
