= 1947 Manchester City Council election =

Local election in Manchester, England

- 1 November 1947

36 of 144 seats to Manchester City Council 73 seats needed for a majority
	First party	Second party	Third party
Party	Labour	Conservative	Liberal
Last election	20 seats, 45.6%	15 seats, 41.5%	1 seats, 10.2%
Seats before	76	58	10
Seats won	13	23	0
Seats after	71	64	9
Seat change	▼5	▲6	▼1
Popular vote	119,674	150,599	13,027
Percentage	41.9%	52.7%	4.5%
Swing	▼3.7%	▲11.2%	▼5.7%
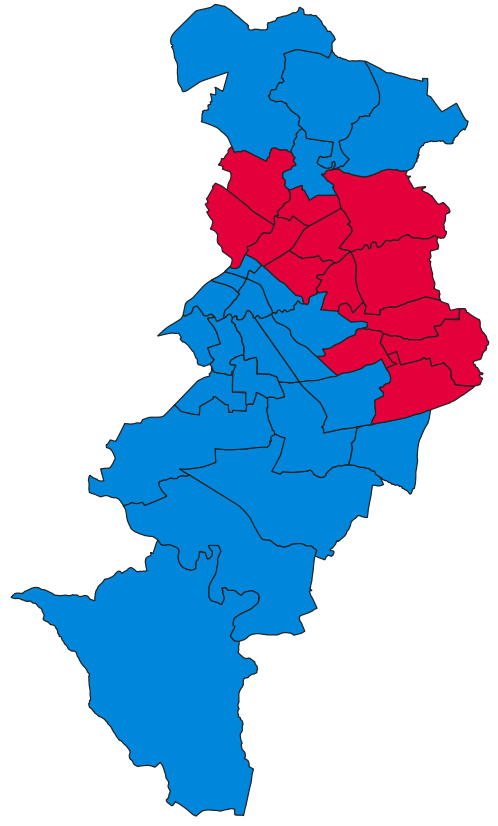
- Map of results of 1947 election
Leader of the Council before election
Labour
Leader of the Council after election
No overall control

Elections to Manchester City Council were held on Saturday, 1 November 1947. One third of the councillors seats were up for election, with each successful candidate to serve a three-year term of office. The Labour Party lost overall control of the council.

== Election result ==
Party	Votes		Seats			Full Council	
Labour Party	119,674 (41.9%)	▼3.7	13 (36.1%)	13 / 36	▼5	71 (49.3%)	71 / 144
Conservative Party	150,599 (52.7%)	▲11.2	23 (63.9%)	23 / 36	▲6	64 (44.4%)	64 / 144
Liberal Party	13,027 (4.5%)	▼5.7	0 (0.0%)	0 / 36	▼1	9 (6.3%)	9 / 144
Communist	2,376 (0.8%)	▼0.6	0 (0.0%)	0 / 36	Steady	0 (0.0%)	0 / 144
Independent	54 (0.0%)	▼0.6	0 (0.0%)	0 / 36	Steady	0 (0.0%)	0 / 144

=== Full council ===
↓
71	9	64

=== Aldermen ===
↓
16	8	12

=== Councillors ===
↓
55	1	52

== Ward results ==
=== All Saints' ===
All Saints'
Party	Candidate	Votes	%	±%
Conservative	R. S. Harper*	2,668	55.5	+4.4
Labour	J. Lenten	2,135	44.5	−0.1
Majority		533	11.0	+4.5
Turnout		4,803		
Conservative hold		Swing		

=== Ardwick ===
Ardwick
Party	Candidate	Votes	%	±%
Conservative	P. Buckley*	3,917	55.0	+6.2
Labour	J. Singleton	3,200	45.0	−6.2
Majority		717	10.0	
Turnout		7,117		
Conservative hold		Swing		

=== Beswick ===
Beswick
Party	Candidate	Votes	%	±%
Labour	T. W. Farrell*	4,845	58.0	−10.2
Conservative	G. Bryant	3,511	42.0	+10.2
Majority		1,334	16.0	−20.4
Turnout		8,356		
Labour hold		Swing		

=== Blackley ===
Blackley
Party	Candidate	Votes	%	±%
Conservative	P. Chadwick	6,763	51.4	N/A
Labour	R. B. Prain*	5,206	39.6	+1.4
Liberal	P. Critchley	1,182	9.0	−52.8
Majority		1,557	11.8	
Turnout		13,151		
Conservative gain from Labour		Swing		

=== Bradford ===
Bradford
Party	Candidate	Votes	%	±%
Labour	E. E. Beavan*	5,276	56.2	−7.1
Conservative	W. Rose	4,119	43.8	+7.1
Majority		1,157	12.4	−14.2
Turnout		9,395		
Labour hold		Swing		

=== Cheetham ===
Cheetham
Party	Candidate	Votes	%	±%
Labour	F. H. A. Micklewright*	3,822	44.5	+6.0
Conservative	H. Green	3,365	39.2	+7.5
Liberal	S. Needoff	1,032	12.0	−7.3
Communist	M. I. Druck	371	4.3	−6.2
Majority		457	5.3	−1.5
Turnout		8,590		
Labour hold		Swing		

=== Chorlton-cum-Hardy ===
Chorlton-cum-Hardy
Party	Candidate	Votes	%	±%
Conservative	R. Turley*	12,999	65.8	+8.3
Labour	D. Molloy	4,633	23.5	−4.4
Liberal	J. T. Chapman	2,114	10.7	−3.9
Majority		8,366	42.3	+12.6
Turnout		19,746		
Conservative hold		Swing		

=== Collegiate Church ===
Collegiate Church
Party	Candidate	Votes	%	±%
Labour	R. Finkel*	1,342	46.8	−8.3
Conservative	G. W. G. Fitzsimons	1,311	45.8	N/A
Communist	M. Jenkins	212	7.4	−2.0
Majority		31	1.0	−28.4
Turnout		2,865		
Labour hold		Swing		

=== Collyhurst ===
Collyhurst
Party	Candidate	Votes	%	±%
Labour	M. Tylecote*	2,393	54.0	−6.4
Conservative	W. H. Cox	1,899	42.9	+10.9
Communist	S. Wild	138	3.1	−4.5
Majority		494	11.1	−17.3
Turnout		4,430		
Labour hold		Swing		

=== Crumpsall ===
Crumpsall
Party	Candidate	Votes	%	±%
Conservative	A. Clapham	5,805	55.4	+9.2
Labour	C. Lynch	2,794	26.6	−7.4
Liberal	R. F. Read	1,566	14.9	−1.0
Communist	S. Waring	321	3.1	−0.8
Majority		3,011	28.8	+16.7
Turnout		10,486		
Conservative hold		Swing		

=== Didsbury ===
Didsbury
Party	Candidate	Votes	%	±%
Conservative	W. White*	8,652	63.7	+10.4
Labour	B. Lawson	2,872	21.2	−5.7
Liberal	W. Fleetwood	1,768	13.0	−5.4
Communist	R. H. Hartman	285	2.1	+0.7
Majority		5,780	42.5	+16.1
Turnout		13,577		
Conservative hold		Swing		

=== Exchange ===
Exchange
Party	Candidate	Votes	%	±%
Conservative	J. W. Coe*	uncontested		
Conservative hold		Swing		

=== Gorton North ===
Gorton North
Party	Candidate	Votes	%	±%
Labour	C. Bentley*	5,304	55.6	−11.3
Conservative	J. P. Traynor	4,231	44.4	+18.4
Majority		1,073	11.2	−29.7
Turnout		9,535		
Labour hold		Swing		

=== Gorton South ===
Gorton South
Party	Candidate	Votes	%	±%
Labour	E. Kirkman*	5,914	57.7	−10.6
Conservative	G. J. Playford	4,344	42.3	+17.0
Majority		1,570	15.4	−27.6
Turnout		10,258		
Labour hold		Swing		

=== Harpurhey ===
Harpurhey
Party	Candidate	Votes	%	±%
Conservative	J. Chatterton	4,282	51.6	+8.3
Labour	C. Blackwell	3,871	46.6	−1.7
Communist	T. Royle	152	1.8	−0.8
Majority		411	5.0	
Turnout		8,305		
Conservative hold		Swing		

=== Levenshulme ===
Levenshulme
Party	Candidate	Votes	%	±%
Conservative	O. Lodge*	4,979	50.6	+13.6
Labour	S. Freeman	3,214	32.7	+3.8
Liberal	C. R. de la Wyche	1,642	16.7	−11.3
Majority		1,765	17.9	+9.8
Turnout		9,835		
Conservative hold		Swing		

=== Longsight ===
Longsight
Party	Candidate	Votes	%	±%
Conservative	E. Elliott*	6,861	60.5	+8.2
Labour	F. Donlon	4,483	39.5	−3.9
Majority		2,378	21.0	+12.1
Turnout		11,344		
Conservative hold		Swing		

=== Medlock Street ===
Medlock Street
Party	Candidate	Votes	%	±%
Conservative	A. Lees	2,474	50.4	+9.9
Labour	A. Harvey*	2,218	45.2	−4.3
Communist	L. B. Johnson	160	3.3	−2.3
Independent	J. Gillespie	54	1.1	N/A
Majority		256	5.2	
Turnout		4,906		
Conservative gain from Labour		Swing		

=== Miles Platting ===
Miles Platting
Party	Candidate	Votes	%	±%
Labour	E. J. Howarth*	3,357	57.2	−3.2
Conservative	J. Priestley	2,512	42.8	+3.2
Majority		845	14.4	−6.4
Turnout		5,869		
Labour hold		Swing		

=== Moss Side East ===
Moss Side East
Party	Candidate	Votes	%	±%
Conservative	J. E. Pheasey*	3,249	53.3	+18.0
Labour	A. McAdam	2,476	40.6	+1.1
Liberal	R. Frere	369	6.1	N/A
Majority		773	12.7	
Turnout		6,094		
Conservative hold		Swing		

=== Moss Side West ===
Moss Side West
Party	Candidate	Votes	%	±%
Conservative	R. H. W. Owen	4,641	57.1	+13.9
Labour	H. Quinney*	3,088	38.0	−2.3
Liberal	G. Escott	394	4.9	−3.2
Majority		1,553	19.1	+16.2
Turnout		8,123		
Conservative gain from Labour		Swing		

=== Moston ===
Moston
Party	Candidate	Votes	%	±%
Conservative	M. Dunn*	6,414	48.9	+7.8
Labour	R. J. Latham	5,713	43.5	−6.7
Liberal	J. H. Cully	1,001	7.6	−1.2
Majority		701	5.4	−3.7
Turnout		13,128		
Conservative hold		Swing		

=== New Cross ===
New Cross
Party	Candidate	Votes	%	±%
Labour	M. Knight*	2,350	58.3	−13.6
Conservative	A. Nixon	1,682	41.7	+13.6
Majority		668	16.6	−27.2
Turnout		4,032		
Labour hold		Swing		

=== Newton Heath ===
Newton Heath
Party	Candidate	Votes	%	±%
Labour	J. Hellier*	4,582	52.6	−6.7
Conservative	W. H. Priestnall	4,122	47.4	+6.7
Majority		460	5.2	−13.4
Turnout		8,704		
Labour hold		Swing		

=== Openshaw ===
Openshaw
Party	Candidate	Votes	%	±%
Labour	S. Jolly	4,206	58.4	−11.1
Conservative	T. Sparrow	2,728	37.9	+13.2
Communist	T. Rowlandson	268	3.7	−2.1
Majority		1,478	20.5	−24.3
Turnout		7,202		
Labour hold		Swing		

=== Oxford ===
Oxford
Party	Candidate	Votes	%	±%
Conservative	S. A. Gradwell*	uncontested		
Conservative hold		Swing		

=== Rusholme ===
Rusholme
Party	Candidate	Votes	%	±%
Conservative	A. T. Barratt*	6,696	68.7	+3.3
Labour	E. Wood	3,057	31.3	−3.3
Majority		3,639	37.4	+6.6
Turnout		9,753		
Conservative hold		Swing		

=== St. Ann's ===
St. Ann's
Party	Candidate	Votes	%	±%
Conservative	H. Marshall*	uncontested		
Conservative hold		Swing		

=== St. Clement's ===
St. Clement's
Party	Candidate	Votes	%	±%
Conservative	N. Beer	387	67.7	−5.1
Labour	H. McRoy	95	16.6	−8.5
Liberal	J. E. McManus	90	15.7	N/A
Majority		292	51.1	+3.4
Turnout		572		
Conservative gain from Liberal		Swing		

=== St. George's ===
St. George's
Party	Candidate	Votes	%	±%
Conservative	J. H. Kearns*	3,218	53.4	+10.5
Labour	J. Dawson	2,805	46.6	−10.5
Majority		413	6.8	
Turnout		6,023		
Conservative hold		Swing		

=== St. John's ===
St. John's
Party	Candidate	Votes	%	±%
Conservative	H. Harker*	726	82.7	+20.3
Labour	J. Fern	152	17.3	+3.8
Majority		574	65.4	+27.1
Turnout		878		
Conservative hold		Swing		

=== St. Luke's ===
St. Luke's
Party	Candidate	Votes	%	±%
Conservative	A. Holberry	4,209	58.9	+9.5
Labour	J. H. Alsop*	2,943	41.1	−1.3
Majority		1,266	17.8	+10.8
Turnout		7,152		
Conservative gain from Labour		Swing		

=== St. Mark's ===
St. Mark's
Party	Candidate	Votes	%	±%
Labour	H. Eastwood*	3,812	56.0	−6.0
Conservative	W. Sharp	3,000	44.0	+9.2
Majority		812	12.0	−15.2
Turnout		6,812		
Labour hold		Swing		

=== St. Michael's ===
St. Michael's
Party	Candidate	Votes	%	±%
Labour	M. F. Griffin*	2,667	67.3	−12.7
Conservative	J. Judge	1,295	32.7	N/A
Majority		1,372	34.6	−25.4
Turnout		3,962		
Labour hold		Swing		

=== Withington ===
Withington
Party	Candidate	Votes	%	±%
Conservative	H. Bentley*	13,817	61.7	+7.3
Labour	F. H. Robinson	6,712	30.0	−5.3
Liberal	A. J. Higson	1,869	8.3	−2.0
Majority		7,105	31.7	+12.6
Turnout		22,398		
Conservative hold		Swing		

=== Wythenshawe ===
Wythenshawe
Party	Candidate	Votes	%	±%
Conservative	A. I. Oliver	9,723	53.0	+7.7
Labour	E. A. Yarwood*	8,137	44.4	−5.3
Communist	W. Prince	469	2.6	−2.4
Majority		1,586	8.6	
Turnout		18,329		
Conservative gain from Labour		Swing		

== Aldermanic elections ==
=== Aldermanic election, 5 May 1948 ===
Caused by the death on 18 April 1948 of Alderman Cyril Roylance de la Wyche (Liberal, elected as an alderman by the council on 4 March 1942).

In his place, Councillor S. P. Dawson (Conservative, Didsbury, elected 1 November 1928) was elected as an alderman by the council on 5 May 1948.

Party	Alderman	Ward	Term expires
Conservative	S. P. Dawson	Newton Heath	1949

=== Aldermanic election, 2 February 1949 ===
Caused by the death on 24 January 1949 of Alderman John Septimus Hill (Conservative, elected as an alderman by the council on 4 February 1942).

In his place, Councillor William Somerville (Conservative, Chorlton-cum-Hardy, elected 20 December 1928) was elected as an alderman by the council on 2 February 1949.

Party	Alderman	Ward	Term expires
Conservative	William Somerville	Levenshulme	1952

=== Aldermanic election, 2 March 1949 ===
Caused by the resignation on 15 February 1949 of Alderman Dr. Emrys Lloyd Jones (Labour, elected as an alderman by the council on 5 September 1945).

In his place, Councillor Leslie Lever (Labour, New Cross, elected 8 November 1932) was elected as an alderman by the council on 2 March 1949.

Party	Alderman	Ward	Term expires
Labour	Leslie Lever		1949

== By-elections between 1947 and 1949 ==
=== Miles Platting, 5 February 1948 ===
Caused by the death of Councillor W. F. Irvine (Labour, Miles Platting, elected 1 November 1945) on 22 December 1947.

Miles Platting
Party	Candidate	Votes	%	±%
Labour	H. Quinney	2,628	52.4	−4.8
Conservative	J. Priestley	2,390	47.6	+4.8
Majority		238	4.8	−9.6
Turnout		5,018		
Labour hold		Swing		

=== Didsbury, 3 June 1948 ===
Caused by the election as an alderman of Councillor S. P. Dawson (Conservative, Didsbury, elected 1 November 1928) on 5 May 1948, following the death on 18 April 1948 of Alderman Cyril Roylance de la Wyche (Liberal, elected as an alderman by the council on 4 March 1942).

Didsbury
Party	Candidate	Votes	%	±%
Conservative	G. C. Hilditch	4,208	66.9	+3.2
Liberal	G. Escott	1,837	29.2	+16.2
Communist	R. H. Hartman	242	3.9	+1.8
Majority		2,371	37.7	−4.8
Turnout		6,287		
Conservative hold		Swing		

=== Exchange, 25 October 1948 ===
Caused by the death of Councillor John William Coe (Conservative, Exchange, elected 1 November 1938) on 15 September 1948.

Exchange
Party	Candidate	Votes	%	±%
Conservative	R. H. Ackerley	uncontested		
Conservative hold		Swing		

=== St. Luke's, 3 November 1948 ===
Caused by the resignation of Councillor C. Victor Jarvis (Conservative, St. Luke's, elected 1 November 1946; previously 1938-45) on 15 September 1948.

St. Luke's
Party	Candidate	Votes	%	±%
Conservative	W. E. A. Yates	3,233	52.7	−6.2
Labour	C. Blackwell	2,896	47.3	+6.2
Majority		337	5.4	−12.4
Turnout		6,129		
Conservative hold		Swing		

=== Chorlton-cum-Hardy, 10 March 1949 ===
Caused by the election as an alderman of Councillor William Somerville (Conservative, Chorlton-cum-Hardy, elected 20 December 1928) on 2 February 1949, following the death on 24 January 1949 of Alderman John Septimus Hill (Conservative, elected as an alderman by the council on 4 February 1942).

Chorlton-cum-Hardy
Party	Candidate	Votes	%	±%
Conservative	G. W. G. Fitzsimons	7,036	66.1	+0.3
Labour	W. M. Parkinson	2,584	24.3	+0.8
Independent Liberal	J. T. Chapman	1,031	9.6	N/A
Majority		4,452	41.8	−0.5
Turnout		10,651		
Conservative hold		Swing		
