= Collyhurst (ward) =

- Ward
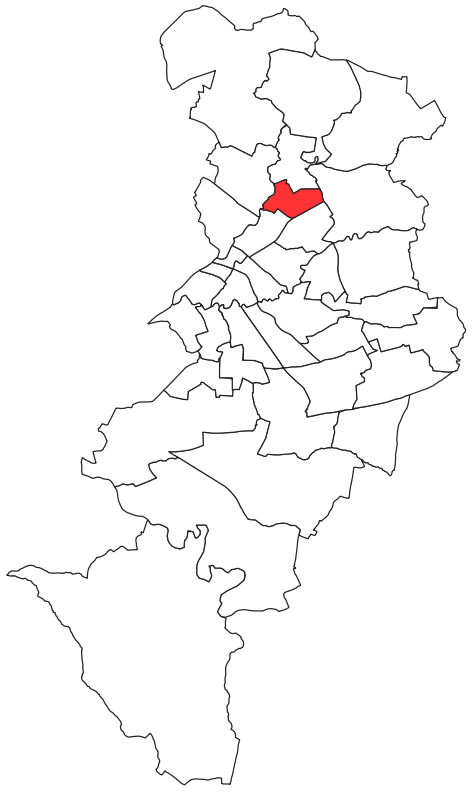
- Collyhurst ward (1931) within Manchester

- Coat of arms
- Country: United Kingdom
- Constituent country: England
- Region: North West England
- County borough: Manchester
- Created: November 1919
- Named for: Collyhurst

Government
  - Type: Unicameral
  - Body: Manchester City Council
- UK Parliamentary Constituency: Manchester Cheetham

Collyhurst was an electoral division of Manchester City Council which was represented from 1919 until 1950. It covered Collyhurst and Monsall to the north of Manchester city centre.

== Overview ==
Collyhurst ward was created in 1919, from the southern portion of the Harpurhey ward. In 1950, the ward was abolished, and its area became part of the new Newtown ward.

From 1919 until 1950, the ward formed part of the Manchester Platting Parliamentary constituency. It briefly formed part of the Manchester Cheetham Parliamentary constituency from 1950 until its abolition.

== Councillors ==
Election	Councillor	Councillor	Councillor
1919	M. Jagger (Lab)	H. Lee (Lib)	A. Park (Co-op)
1920	M. Jagger (Lab)	H. Lee (Lib)	A. Park (Co-op)
1921	M. Jagger (Lab)	J. R. Midgley (Con)	A. Park (Lab)
1922	F. Brine (Con)	J. R. Midgley (Con)	A. Park (Lab)
1923	F. Brine (Con)	J. R. Midgley (Con)	E. Shields (Con)
1924	F. Brine (Con)	W. Chapman (Con)	E. Shields (Con)
October 1925	F. Brine (Con)	I. Floyd (Lab)	E. Shields (Con)
1925	F. Brine (Con)	I. Floyd (Lab)	E. Shields (Con)
1926	F. Brine (Con)	I. Floyd (Lab)	W. Johnston (Lab)
1927	F. Brine (Con)	I. Floyd (Lab)	W. Johnston (Lab)
1928	R. Malcolm (Lab)	I. Floyd (Lab)	W. Johnston (Lab)
1929	R. Malcolm (Lab)	I. Floyd (Lab)	W. Johnston (Lab)
1930	R. Malcolm (Lab)	I. Floyd (Lab)	W. Johnston (Lab)
1931	L. E. Wilson (Con)	I. Floyd (Lab)	W. Johnston (Lab)
1932	L. E. Wilson (Con)	I. Floyd (Lab)	W. Johnston (Lab)
1933	L. E. Wilson (Con)	I. Floyd (Lab)	W. Johnston (Lab)
1934	W. Collingson (Lab)	I. Floyd (Lab)	W. Johnston (Lab)
1935	W. Collingson (Lab)	I. Floyd (Lab)	W. Johnston (Lab)
1936	W. Collingson (Lab)	I. Floyd (Lab)	W. Johnston (Lab)
1937	W. Collingson (Lab)	I. Floyd (Lab)	W. Johnston (Lab)
1938	W. Collingson (Lab)	I. Floyd (Lab)	W. Johnston (Lab)
1945	W. Collingson (Lab)	R. Malcolm (Lab)	M. Tylecote (Lab)
1946	W. Collingson (Lab)	R. Malcolm (Lab)	M. Tylecote (Lab)
1947	W. Collingson (Lab)	R. Malcolm (Lab)	M. Tylecote (Lab)
1949	W. Collingson (Lab)	R. Malcolm (Lab)	M. Tylecote (Lab)

== Elections ==
=== Elections in 1910s ===
==== November 1919 ====
1919 (3 vacancies)
Party	Candidate	Votes	%	±%
Labour	M. Jagger	2,359	89.6	
Liberal	H. Lee	1,593	60.5	
Co-operative Party	A. Park	1,454	55.2	
Conservative	H. E. Storey	1,011	38.4	
Conservative	J. H. Stovell	776	29.5	
Conservative	S. Bloor	706	26.8	
Majority		443	16.8	
Turnout		2,633	29.5	
Labour win (new seat)				
Liberal win (new seat)				
Co-operative Party win (new seat)				

=== Elections in 1920s ===
==== November 1920 ====
1920
Party	Candidate	Votes	%	±%
Co-operative Party	A. Park*	1,515	73.6	+18.4
Independent	J. T. Fisher	309	15.0	N/A
NFDDSS	J. Greaves	234	11.4	N/A
Majority		1,206	58.6	+41.8
Turnout		2,058	23.1	−6.4
Co-operative Party hold		Swing		

==== November 1921 ====
1921
Party	Candidate	Votes	%	±%
Conservative	J. R. Midgley	3,081	58.7	N/A
Liberal	H. Lee*	2,168	41.3	N/A
Majority		913	17.4	
Turnout		5,249	59.0	+38.9
Conservative gain from Liberal		Swing		

==== November 1922 ====
1922
Party	Candidate	Votes	%	±%
Conservative	F. Brine	2,482	50.3	−8.4
Labour	M. Jagger*	2,449	49.7	N/A
Majority		33	0.6	−16.8
Turnout		4,931	54.0	−5.0
Conservative gain from Labour		Swing		

==== November 1923 ====
1923
Party	Candidate	Votes	%	±%
Conservative	E. Shields	2,764	54.7	+4.4
Labour	A. Park*	2,286	45.3	−4.4
Majority		478	9.4	+8.8
Turnout		5,050		
Conservative gain from Labour		Swing		

==== November 1924 ====
1924
Party	Candidate	Votes	%	±%
Conservative	W. Chapman	2,901	51.4	−3.3
Labour	I. Floyd	2,746	48.6	+3.3
Majority		155	2.8	−6.6
Turnout		5,547		
Conservative hold		Swing		

==== October 1925 (by-election) ====
By-election: 20 October 1925
Party	Candidate	Votes	%	±%
Labour	I. Floyd	2,489	54.5	+5.9
Conservative	C. F. Howarth	2,081	45.5	−5.9
Majority		408	9.0	
Turnout		4,570		
Labour gain from Conservative		Swing		

==== November 1925 ====
1925
Party	Candidate	Votes	%	±%
Conservative	F. Brine*	3,035	50.2	−1.2
Labour	P. L. Martin	3,013	49.8	+1.2
Majority		22	0.4	−2.4
Turnout		6,048	64.1	
Conservative hold		Swing		

==== November 1926 ====
1926
Party	Candidate	Votes	%	±%
Labour	W. Johnston	3,139	55.6	+5.8
Conservative	E. Shields*	2,504	44.4	−5.8
Majority		635	11.2	
Turnout		5,643	60.1	−4.0
Labour gain from Conservative		Swing		

==== November 1927 ====
1927
Party	Candidate	Votes	%	±%
Labour	I. Floyd*	2,990	56.8	+1.2
Conservative	C. F. Haworth	2,274	43.2	−1.2
Majority		716	13.6	+2.4
Turnout		5,264	56.0	−4.1
Labour hold		Swing		

==== November 1928 ====
1928
Party	Candidate	Votes	%	±%
Labour	R. Malcolm	3,078	51.3	−5.5
Conservative	F. Brine*	2,839	47.3	+4.1
Communist	G. W. Chandler	66	1.1	N/A
Residents	J. F. Gavin	16	0.3	N/A
Majority		239	4.0	−9.6
Turnout		5,999	64.1	+8.1
Labour gain from Conservative		Swing		

==== November 1929 ====
1929
Party	Candidate	Votes	%	±%
Labour	W. Johnston*	2,776	68.4	+17.1
Conservative	T. C. Owtram	1,280	31.6	−15.7
Majority		1,496	36.8	+32.8
Turnout		4,056	39.7	−24.4
Labour hold		Swing		

=== Elections in 1930s ===
==== November 1930 ====
1930
Party	Candidate	Votes	%	±%
Labour	I. Floyd*	2,654	50.3	−18.1
Conservative	T. C. Owtram	2,624	49.7	+18.1
Majority		30	0.6	−36.2
Turnout		5,278		
Labour hold		Swing		

==== November 1931 ====
1931
Party	Candidate	Votes	%	±%
Conservative	L. E. Wilson	3,043	51.2	+1.5
Labour	R. Malcolm*	2,792	47.0	−3.3
Communist	S. Nuttall	103	1.8	N/A
Majority		251	4.2	
Turnout		5,938	59.7	
Conservative gain from Labour		Swing		

==== November 1932 ====
1932
Party	Candidate	Votes	%	±%
Labour	W. Johnston*	3,729	65.6	+18.6
Conservative	A. Heald	1,904	33.5	−17.7
Communist	J. Dunn	52	0.9	−0.9
Majority		1,825	32.1	
Turnout		5,685		
Labour hold		Swing		

==== November 1933 ====
1933
Party	Candidate	Votes	%	±%
Labour	I. Floyd*	3,409	62.4	−3.2
Conservative	A. Heald	1,901	34.8	+1.5
Communist	G. Brown	146	2.7	+1.8
Majority		1,508	27.6	−4.5
Turnout		5,456		
Labour hold		Swing		

==== November 1934 ====
1934
Party	Candidate	Votes	%	±%
Labour	W. Collingson	3,059	66.2	+3.8
Conservative	L. E. Wilson*	1,560	33.8	−1.0
Majority		1,499	32.4	+4.8
Turnout		4,619		
Labour gain from Conservative		Swing		

==== November 1935 ====
1935
Party	Candidate	Votes	%	±%
Labour	W. Johnston*	uncontested		
Labour hold		Swing		

==== November 1936 ====
1936
Party	Candidate	Votes	%	±%
Labour	I. Floyd*	2,033	62.7	N/A
Conservative	J. R. Spence	1,208	37.3	N/A
Majority		825	25.4	N/A
Turnout		3,241		
Labour hold		Swing		

==== November 1937 ====
1937
Party	Candidate	Votes	%	±%
Labour	W. Collingson*	1,624	65.3	+2.6
Conservative	M. Williams	864	34.7	−2.6
Majority		760	30.6	+5.2
Turnout		2,488		
Labour hold		Swing		

==== November 1938 ====
1938
Party	Candidate	Votes	%	±%
Labour	W. Johnston*	1,709	87.6	+22.3
British Union	F. Fowden	242	12.4	N/A
Majority		1,467	75.2	+44.6
Turnout		1,951		
Labour hold		Swing		

=== Elections in 1940s ===
==== November 1945 ====
1945 (2 vacancies)
Party	Candidate	Votes	%	±%
Labour	R. Malcolm*	1,962	55.1	−32.5
Labour	M. Tylecote*	1,925	54.0	−33.6
Conservative	T. Smith	804	22.6	N/A
Communist	S. Wild	796	22.4	N/A
Majority		1,121	31.4	−43.8
Turnout		3,562		
Labour hold		Swing		
Labour hold		Swing		

==== November 1946 ====
1946
Party	Candidate	Votes	%	±%
Labour	W. Collingson*	2,102	60.4	+5.3
Conservative	W. H. Cox	1,115	32.0	+9.4
Communist	S. Wild	262	7.6	−14.8
Majority		987	28.4	−3.0
Turnout		3,479		
Labour hold		Swing		

==== November 1947 ====
1947
Party	Candidate	Votes	%	±%
Labour	M. Tylecote*	2,393	54.0	−6.4
Conservative	W. H. Cox	1,899	42.9	+10.9
Communist	S. Wild	138	3.1	−4.5
Majority		494	11.1	−17.3
Turnout		4,430		
Labour hold		Swing		

==== May 1949 ====
1949
Party	Candidate	Votes	%	±%
Labour	R. Malcolm*	2,424	60.4	+6.4
Conservative	W. H. Turney	1,543	38.4	−4.5
Communist	J. B. Cross	47	1.2	−1.9
Majority		881	22.0	+10.9
Turnout		4,014		
Labour hold		Swing		

== See also ==
- Manchester City Council
- Manchester City Council elections
