= St. John's (Manchester ward) =

- Ward
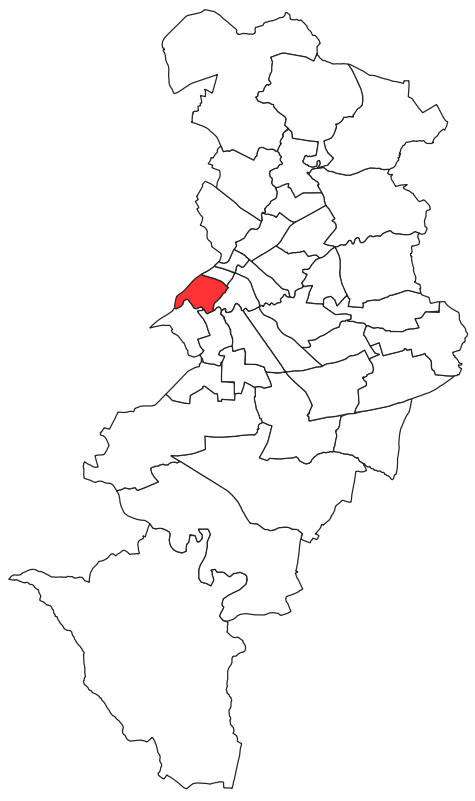
- St. John's ward (1931) within Manchester

- Coat of arms
- Country: United Kingdom
- Constituent country: England
- Region: North West England
- County borough: Manchester
- Created: December 1838
- Named for: St. John's

Government
  - Type: Unicameral
  - Body: Manchester City Council
- UK Parliamentary Constituency: Manchester Exchange

St. John's was an electoral division of Manchester City Council which was represented from 1838 until 1950. It covered part of Manchester city centre including the area surrounding St. John's Gardens.

== Overview ==
St. John's ward was one of the fifteen municipal wards created in 1838, when the Manchester Borough Council was granted a Charter of Incorporation under the provisions of the Municipal Corporations Act 1835.

Initially, the ward's boundaries corresponded with those of Districts No.13 (Old Quay) and No.14 (St. John's) of the Manchester Township, which covered the area of Manchester city centre including Castlefield and the area surrounding Deansgate. Its original boundaries remained in place until 1919 when the southern portion of the former St. James' ward, including St. Peter's Square was transferred to the ward. In 1950, the ward was abolished, and its area became part of the new St. Peter's ward.

From 1838 until 1885, the ward formed part of the Manchester Parliamentary constituency. From 1885 until 1918, it was part of the Manchester North West Parliamentary constituency. From 1918 until its abolition, it was part of the Manchester Exchange Parliamentary constituency.

== Councillors ==
Election	Councillor	Councillor	Councillor
1838	Alexander Kay (Lib)	George Brown (Lib)	John Griffiths (Lib)
May 1839	Thomas Frodsham (Lib)	George Brown (Lib)	John Griffiths (Lib)
1839	Thomas Frodsham (Lib)	George Brown (Lib)	John Griffiths (Lib)
1840	Thomas Frodsham (Lib)	George Brown (Lib)	John Griffiths (Lib)
1841	Thomas Bazley (Lib)	George Brown (Lib)	John Griffiths (Lib)
1842	Thomas Bazley (Lib)	George Brown (Lib)	James Whitworth (Lib)
1843	Thomas Bazley (Lib)	George Brown (Lib)	James Whitworth (Lib)
1844	John Woollam (Con)	George Brown (Lib)	James Whitworth (Lib)
1845	John Woollam (Con)	George Brown (Lib)	William Harrison (Con)
(1845–1872)
1872	N. Kilvert (Con)	J. R. Hampson (Lib)	J. Sawley Brown (Lib)
1873	N. Kilvert (Con)	J. Smith (Con)	J. Sawley Brown (Lib)
1874	N. Kilvert (Con)	J. Smith (Con)	J. Sawley Brown (Lib)
1875	N. Kilvert (Con)	J. Smith (Con)	W. Livesley (Con)
1876	N. Kilvert (Con)	J. Smith (Con)	W. Livesley (Con)
1877	W. Robinson (Con)	J. Smith (Con)	W. Livesley (Con)
1878	W. Robinson (Con)	J. Smith (Con)	W. Livesley (Con)
1879	W. Robinson (Con)	J. Smith (Con)	W. Livesley (Con)
1880	W. Robinson (Con)	J. Smith (Con)	W. Livesley (Con)
1881	W. Robinson (Con)	J. Smith (Con)	W. Livesley (Con)
1882	W. Robinson (Con)	G. Kenworthy (Con)	W. Livesley (Con)
1883	W. Robinson (Con)	G. Kenworthy (Con)	W. Livesley (Con)
1884	W. Robinson (Con)	G. Kenworthy (Con)	W. Livesley (Con)
1885	W. Robinson (Con)	G. Kenworthy (Con)	W. Livesley (Con)
1886	W. Robinson (Con)	G. Kenworthy (Con)	W. Livesley (Con)
July 1887	W. Robinson (Con)	G. Kenworthy (Con)	J. H. Cuff (Con)
1887	W. Robinson (Con)	G. Kenworthy (Con)	J. H. Cuff (Con)
1888	W. Robinson (Con)	G. Kenworthy (Con)	J. H. Cuff (Con)
July 1889	W. Robinson (Con)	J. Myerscough (Con)	J. H. Cuff (Con)
1889	W. Robinson (Con)	J. Myerscough (Con)	J. H. Cuff (Con)
November 1889	F. Smallman (Lib)	J. Myerscough (Con)	J. H. Cuff (Con)
1890	F. Smallman (Lib)	J. Myerscough (Con)	J. H. Cuff (Con)
April 1891	F. Smallman (Lib)	E. L. Kenworthy (Con)	J. H. Cuff (Con)
1891	F. Smallman (Lib)	E. L. Kenworthy (Con)	J. H. Cuff (Con)
1892	H. Shuttleworth (Con)	E. L. Kenworthy (Con)	J. H. Cuff (Con)
1893	H. Shuttleworth (Con)	E. L. Kenworthy (Con)	M. W. Southern (Lib)
1894	H. Shuttleworth (Con)	M. Wells (Lib)	M. W. Southern (Lib)
1895	H. Shuttleworth (Con)	M. Wells (Lib)	M. W. Southern (Lib)
1896	H. Shuttleworth (Con)	M. Wells (Lib)	M. W. Southern (Lib)
1897	H. Shuttleworth (Con)	M. Wells (Lib)	M. W. Southern (Lib)
1898	H. Shuttleworth (Con)	M. Wells (Lib)	M. W. Southern (Lib)
1899	H. Shuttleworth (Con)	M. Wells (Lib)	T. Watmough (Con)
1900	H. Shuttleworth (Con)	J. Ingle (Con)	T. Watmough (Con)
1901	T. C. Abbott (Lib)	J. Ingle (Con)	T. Watmough (Con)
1902	T. C. Abbott (Lib)	J. Ingle (Con)	T. Watmough (Con)
1903	T. C. Abbott (Lib)	J. Ingle (Con)	T. Watmough (Con)
1904	H. Shuttleworth (Con)	J. Ingle (Con)	T. Watmough (Con)
1905	H. Shuttleworth (Con)	J. Ingle (Con)	T. Watmough (Con)
1906	H. Shuttleworth (Con)	W. Barton (Lib)	T. Watmough (Con)
1907	H. Shuttleworth (Con)	W. Barton (Lib)	T. Watmough (Con)
1908	H. Shuttleworth (Con)	W. Barton (Lib)	T. Watmough (Con)
1909	H. Shuttleworth (Con)	H. W. Billam (Con)	T. Watmough (Con)
1910	I. Hinchliffe (Con)	H. W. Billam (Con)	T. Watmough (Con)
1911	I. Hinchliffe (Con)	H. W. Billam (Con)	T. Watmough (Con)
1912	I. Hinchliffe (Con)	T. Foden (Con)	T. Watmough (Con)
1913	I. Hinchliffe (Con)	T. Foden (Con)	T. Watmough (Con)
November 1913	I. Hinchliffe (Con)	T. Foden (Con)	J. Bayliss (Con)
1914	I. Hinchliffe (Con)	T. Foden (Con)	J. Bayliss (Con)
1919	I. Hinchliffe (Con)	T. Foden (Con)	J. Bayliss (Con)
1920	I. Hinchliffe (Con)	T. Foden (Con)	J. Bayliss (Con)
1921	I. Hinchliffe (Con)	T. Foden (Con)	J. Bayliss (Con)
1922	I. Hinchliffe (Con)	T. R. Hewlett (Con)	J. Bayliss (Con)
1923	I. Hinchliffe (Con)	T. R. Hewlett (Con)	J. Bayliss (Con)
1924	I. Hinchliffe (Con)	T. R. Hewlett (Con)	W. Barton (Lib)
1925	I. Hinchliffe (Con)	T. R. Hewlett (Con)	W. Barton (Lib)
1926	I. Hinchliffe (Con)	T. R. Hewlett (Con)	W. Barton (Lib)
1927	I. Hinchliffe (Con)	T. R. Hewlett (Con)	A. C. Gardner (Con)
1928	I. Hinchliffe (Con)	T. R. Hewlett (Con)	A. C. Gardner (Con)
March 1929	H. Dunks (Con)	T. R. Hewlett (Con)	A. C. Gardner (Con)
1929	M. A. Gibbons (Lib)	T. R. Hewlett (Con)	A. C. Gardner (Con)
May 1930	M. A. Gibbons (Lib)	T. R. Hewlett (Con)	J. E. Burgess (Con)
1930	M. A. Gibbons (Lib)	T. R. Hewlett (Con)	J. E. Burgess (Con)
May 1931	M. A. Gibbons (Lib)	F. E. Tylecote (Lib)	J. E. Burgess (Con)
1931	M. A. Gibbons (Lib)	F. E. Tylecote (Lib)	J. E. Burgess (Con)
1932	M. A. Gibbons (Lib)	F. E. Tylecote (Lib)	J. E. Burgess (Con)
1933	M. A. Gibbons (Lib)	F. E. Tylecote (Lib)	J. E. Burgess (Con)
1934	M. A. Gibbons (Lib)	F. E. Tylecote (Lib)	J. E. Burgess (Con)
1935	M. A. Gibbons (Lib)	F. E. Tylecote (Lib)	J. E. Burgess (Con)
1936	M. A. Gibbons (Lib)	F. E. Tylecote (Lib)	J. E. Burgess (Con)
1937	M. A. Gibbons (Lib)	F. E. Tylecote (Lib)	J. E. Burgess (Con)
1938	M. A. Gibbons (Lib)	F. E. Tylecote (Lib)	J. E. Burgess (Con)
1945	H. Harker (Con)	F. E. Tylecote (Lib)	J. E. Burgess (Con)
September 1946	H. Harker (Con)	F. E. Tylecote (Con)	J. E. Burgess (Con)
1946	H. Harker (Con)	F. E. Tylecote (Con)	J. E. Burgess (Con)
1947	H. Harker (Con)	F. E. Tylecote (Con)	J. E. Burgess (Con)
1949	H. Harker (Con)	F. E. Tylecote (Con)	J. E. Burgess (Con)
June 1949	H. Harker (Con)	F. E. Tylecote (Con)	J. McGrath (Con)

== Elections ==
=== Elections in 1830s ===
==== December 1838 ====
1838 (3 vacancies)
Party	Candidate	Votes	%	±%
Liberal	Alexander Kay	238	100.0	
Liberal	George Brown	238	100.0	
Liberal	John Griffiths	237	99.6	
Turnout		238		
Liberal win (new seat)				
Liberal win (new seat)				
Liberal win (new seat)				

==== May 1839 (by-election) ====
By-election: 16 May 1839
Party	Candidate	Votes	%	±%
Liberal	Thomas Frodsham	uncontested		
Liberal hold		Swing		

==== November 1839 ====
1839
Party	Candidate	Votes	%	±%
Liberal	John Griffiths*	uncontested		
Liberal hold		Swing		

=== Elections in 1840s ===
==== November 1840 ====
1840
Party	Candidate	Votes	%	±%
Liberal	George Brown*	uncontested		
Liberal hold		Swing		

==== November 1841 ====
1841
Party	Candidate	Votes	%	±%
Liberal	Thomas Bazley	uncontested		
Liberal hold		Swing		

==== November 1842 ====
1842
Party	Candidate	Votes	%	±%
Liberal	James Whitworth	uncontested		
Liberal hold		Swing		

==== November 1843 ====
1843
Party	Candidate	Votes	%	±%
Liberal	George Brown*	uncontested		
Liberal hold		Swing		

==== November 1844 ====
1844
Party	Candidate	Votes	%	±%
Conservative	John Woollam	151	65.9	N/A
Liberal	John Simpson	78	34.1	N/A
Majority		73	31.8	N/A
Turnout		229		
Conservative gain from Liberal		Swing		

==== November 1845 ====
1845
Party	Candidate	Votes	%	±%
Conservative	William Harrison	uncontested		
Conservative gain from Liberal		Swing		

=== Elections in 1870s ===
==== November 1872 ====
1872
Party	Candidate	Votes	%	±%
Liberal	J. Sawley Brown	799	56.1	
Conservative	W. Livesley*	626	43.9	
Majority		173	12.2	
Turnout		1,425		
Liberal gain from Conservative		Swing		

==== November 1873 ====
1873
Party	Candidate	Votes	%	±%
Conservative	J. Smith	830	59.0	+15.1
Liberal	J. R. Hampson*	576	41.0	−15.1
Majority		254	18.0	
Turnout		1,406		
Conservative gain from Liberal		Swing		

==== November 1874 ====
1874
Party	Candidate	Votes	%	±%
Conservative	N. Kilvert*	744	69.4	+10.4
Liberal	A. Maccollah	328	30.6	−10.4
Majority		416	38.8	+20.8
Turnout		1,072		
Conservative hold		Swing		

==== November 1875 ====
1875
Party	Candidate	Votes	%	±%
Conservative	W. Livesley	776	60.5	−8.9
Liberal	J. Beahan	506	39.5	+8.9
Majority		270	21.0	−17.8
Turnout		1,282		
Conservative gain from Liberal		Swing		

==== November 1876 ====
1876
Party	Candidate	Votes	%	±%
Conservative	J. Smith*	822	63.9	+3.4
Liberal	W. Crighton	464	36.1	−3.4
Majority		358	27.8	+6.8
Turnout		1,286		
Conservative hold		Swing		

==== November 1877 ====
1877
Party	Candidate	Votes	%	±%
Conservative	W. Robinson	uncontested		
Conservative hold		Swing		

==== November 1878 ====
1878
Party	Candidate	Votes	%	±%
Conservative	W. Livesley*	uncontested		
Conservative hold		Swing		

==== November 1879 ====
1879
Party	Candidate	Votes	%	±%
Conservative	J. Smith*	uncontested		
Conservative hold		Swing		

=== Elections in 1880s ===
==== November 1880 ====
1880
Party	Candidate	Votes	%	±%
Conservative	W. Robinson*	uncontested		
Conservative hold		Swing		

==== November 1881 ====
1881
Party	Candidate	Votes	%	±%
Conservative	W. Livesley*	uncontested		
Conservative hold		Swing		

==== November 1882 ====
1882
Party	Candidate	Votes	%	±%
Conservative	G. Kenworthy	522	55.7	N/A
Conservative	J. Smith*	415	44.3	N/A
Majority		107	11.4	N/A
Turnout		937		
Conservative gain from Conservative		Swing		

==== November 1883 ====
1883
Party	Candidate	Votes	%	±%
Conservative	W. Robinson*	uncontested		
Conservative hold		Swing		

==== November 1884 ====
1884
Party	Candidate	Votes	%	±%
Conservative	W. Livesley*	575	69.9	N/A
Liberal	H. G. Nicholson	248	30.1	N/A
Majority		327	39.8	N/A
Turnout		823		
Conservative hold		Swing		

==== November 1885 ====
1885
Party	Candidate	Votes	%	±%
Conservative	G. Kenworthy*	uncontested		
Conservative hold		Swing		

==== November 1886 ====
1886
Party	Candidate	Votes	%	±%
Conservative	W. Robinson*	uncontested		
Conservative hold		Swing		

==== July 1887 (by-election) ====
By-election: 1 July 1887
Party	Candidate	Votes	%	±%
Conservative	J. H. Cuff	uncontested		
Conservative hold		Swing		

==== November 1887 ====
1887
Party	Candidate	Votes	%	±%
Conservative	J. H. Cuff*	uncontested		
Conservative hold		Swing		

==== November 1888 ====
1888
Party	Candidate	Votes	%	±%
Conservative	G. Kenworthy*	uncontested		
Conservative hold		Swing		

==== July 1889 (by-election) ====
By-election: 11 July 1889
Party	Candidate	Votes	%	±%
Conservative	J. Myerscough	uncontested		
Conservative hold		Swing		

==== November 1889 ====
1889
Party	Candidate	Votes	%	±%
Conservative	W. Robinson*	uncontested		
Conservative hold		Swing		

==== November 1889 (by-election) ====
By-election: 25 November 1889
Party	Candidate	Votes	%	±%
Liberal	F. Smallman	500	51.8	N/A
Conservative	J. Woodhouse	466	48.2	N/A
Majority		34	3.6	N/A
Turnout		2,602		
Liberal gain from Conservative		Swing		

=== Elections in 1890s ===
==== November 1890 ====
1890
Party	Candidate	Votes	%	±%
Conservative	J. H. Cuff*	590	57.6	N/A
Liberal	W. G. Sutherland	435	42.5	N/A
Majority		155	15.2	N/A
Turnout		1,025		
Conservative hold		Swing		

==== April 1891 (by-election) ====
By-election: 6 April 1891
Party	Candidate	Votes	%	±%
Conservative	E. L. Kenworthy	uncontested		
Conservative hold		Swing		

==== November 1891 ====
1891
Party	Candidate	Votes	%	±%
Conservative	E. L. Kenworthy*	565	55.9	−1.7
Independent	E. Burgess	446	44.1	N/A
Majority		119	11.8	−3.4
Turnout		1,011		
Conservative hold		Swing		

==== November 1892 ====
1892
Party	Candidate	Votes	%	±%
Conservative	H. Shuttleworth	499	58.8	+2.9
Liberal	F. Smallman*	349	41.2	N/A
Majority		150	17.6	+5.8
Turnout		848		
Conservative gain from Liberal		Swing		

==== November 1893 ====
1893
Party	Candidate	Votes	%	±%
Liberal	M. W. Southern	529	54.8	+13.6
Conservative	J. H. Cuff*	437	45.2	−13.6
Majority		92	9.6	
Turnout		966		
Liberal gain from Conservative		Swing		

==== November 1894 ====
1894
Party	Candidate	Votes	%	±%
Liberal	M. Wells	452	49.7	−5.1
Conservative	T. Watmough	369	40.6	−4.6
Ind. Labour Party	W. Harley	88	9.7	N/A
Majority		83	9.1	−0.5
Turnout		909		
Liberal gain from Conservative		Swing		

==== November 1895 ====
1895
Party	Candidate	Votes	%	±%
Conservative	H. Shuttleworth*	434	47.7	+7.1
Liberal	J. Ashworth	277	30.4	−19.3
Ind. Conservative	S. Barnett	199	21.9	N/A
Majority		157	17.3	
Turnout		910		
Conservative hold		Swing		

==== November 1896 ====
1896
Party	Candidate	Votes	%	±%
Liberal	M. W. Southern*	575	55.8	+25.4
Conservative	W. H. Huddleston	455	44.2	−3.5
Majority		120	11.6	
Turnout		1,030		
Liberal hold		Swing		

==== November 1897 ====
1897
Party	Candidate	Votes	%	±%
Liberal	M. Wells*	590	55.2	−0.6
Conservative	W. H. Huddleston	478	44.8	+0.6
Majority		112	10.4	−1.2
Turnout		1,068		
Liberal hold		Swing		

==== November 1898 ====
1898
Party	Candidate	Votes	%	±%
Conservative	H. Shuttleworth*	607	63.4	+18.6
Liberal	J. Barrett	350	36.6	−18.6
Majority		257	26.8	
Turnout		957		
Conservative hold		Swing		

==== November 1899 ====
1899
Party	Candidate	Votes	%	±%
Conservative	T. Watmough	uncontested		
Conservative gain from Liberal		Swing		

=== Elections in 1900s ===
==== November 1900 ====
1900
Party	Candidate	Votes	%	±%
Conservative	J. Ingle	510	51.5	N/A
Liberal	M. Wells*	481	48.5	N/A
Majority		29	3.0	N/A
Turnout		991		
Conservative gain from Liberal		Swing		

==== November 1901 ====
1901
Party	Candidate	Votes	%	±%
Liberal	T. C. Abbott	468	50.9	+2.4
Conservative	H. Shuttleworth*	452	49.1	−2.4
Majority		16	1.8	
Turnout		920		
Liberal gain from Conservative		Swing		

==== November 1902 ====
1902
Party	Candidate	Votes	%	±%
Conservative	T. Watmough*	567	58.2	+9.1
Independent	J. Stevenson	407	41.8	N/A
Majority		160	16.4	
Turnout		974		
Conservative hold		Swing		

==== November 1903 ====
1903
Party	Candidate	Votes	%	±%
Conservative	J. Ingle*	uncontested		
Conservative hold		Swing		

==== November 1904 ====
1904
Party	Candidate	Votes	%	±%
Conservative	H. Shuttleworth	474	50.9	N/A
Liberal	R. Flanagan	431	46.3	N/A
Labour	T. Bolger	26	2.8	N/A
Majority		43	4.6	N/A
Turnout		931		
Conservative gain from Liberal		Swing		

==== November 1905 ====
1905
Party	Candidate	Votes	%	±%
Conservative	T. Watmough*	uncontested		
Conservative hold		Swing		

==== November 1906 ====
1906
Party	Candidate	Votes	%	±%
Liberal	W. Barton	424	54.4	N/A
Conservative	J. B. Langley	355	45.6	N/A
Majority		69	8.8	N/A
Turnout		779		
Liberal gain from Conservative		Swing		

==== November 1907 ====
1907
Party	Candidate	Votes	%	±%
Conservative	H. Shuttleworth*	417	53.7	+8.1
Liberal	P. Earley	360	46.3	−8.1
Majority		57	7.4	
Turnout		777		
Conservative hold		Swing		

==== November 1908 ====
1908
Party	Candidate	Votes	%	±%
Conservative	T. Watmough*	uncontested		
Conservative hold		Swing		

==== November 1909 ====
1909
Party	Candidate	Votes	%	±%
Conservative	H. W. Billam	501	59.9	N/A
Liberal	W. Barton*	335	40.1	N/A
Majority		166	19.8	N/A
Turnout		836		
Conservative gain from Liberal		Swing		

=== Elections in 1910s ===
==== November 1910 ====
1910
Party	Candidate	Votes	%	±%
Conservative	I. Hinchliffe	478	64.4	+4.5
Liberal	E. B. A. Jones	264	35.6	−4.5
Majority		214	28.8	+9.0
Turnout		742		
Conservative hold		Swing		

==== November 1911 ====
1911
Party	Candidate	Votes	%	±%
Conservative	T. Watmough*	403	51.5	−12.9
Liberal	W. Robinow	380	48.5	+12.9
Majority		23	3.0	−25.8
Turnout		783		
Conservative hold		Swing		

==== November 1912 ====
1912
Party	Candidate	Votes	%	±%
Conservative	T. Foden	376	50.8	−0.7
Independent	W. Robinow	364	49.2	N/A
Majority		12	1.6	−1.4
Turnout		740		
Conservative hold		Swing		

==== November 1913 ====
1913
Party	Candidate	Votes	%	±%
Conservative	I. Hinchliffe*	uncontested		
Conservative hold		Swing		

==== November 1913 (by-election) ====
By-election: 21 November 1913
Party	Candidate	Votes	%	±%
Conservative	J. Bayliss	339	51.3	N/A
Liberal	H. Forth	322	48.7	N/A
Majority		17	2.6	N/A
Turnout		661	69.2	N/A
Conservative hold		Swing		

==== November 1914 ====
1914
Party	Candidate	Votes	%	±%
Conservative	J. Bayliss*	uncontested		
Conservative hold		Swing		

==== November 1919 ====
1919 (new boundaries)
Party	Candidate	Votes	%	±%
Conservative	T. Foden*	uncontested		
Conservative hold		Swing		

=== Elections in 1920s ===
==== November 1920 ====
1920
Party	Candidate	Votes	%	±%
Conservative	I. Hinchliffe*	uncontested		
Conservative hold		Swing		

==== November 1921 ====
1921
Party	Candidate	Votes	%	±%
Conservative	J. Bayliss*	709	50.6	N/A
Liberal	H. S. Ashburner	692	49.4	N/A
Majority		17	1.2	N/A
Turnout		1,401	53.3	N/A
Conservative hold		Swing		

==== November 1922 ====
1922
Party	Candidate	Votes	%	±%
Conservative	T. R. Hewlett	867	50.6	0
Liberal	R. E. T. Allan	847	49.4	0
Majority		20	1.2	0
Turnout		1,714	65.8	+12.5
Conservative hold		Swing		

==== November 1923 ====
1923
Party	Candidate	Votes	%	±%
Conservative	I. Hinchliffe*	uncontested		
Conservative hold		Swing		

==== November 1924 ====
1924
Party	Candidate	Votes	%	±%
Liberal	W. Barton	867	55.2	N/A
Conservative	A. E. Ingle	705	44.8	N/A
Majority		162	10.4	N/A
Turnout		1,572		
Liberal gain from Conservative		Swing		

==== November 1925 ====
1925
Party	Candidate	Votes	%	±%
Conservative	T. R. Hewlett*	uncontested		
Conservative hold		Swing		

==== November 1926 ====
1926
Party	Candidate	Votes	%	±%
Conservative	I. Hinchliffe*	1,136	75.4	N/A
Labour	F. Edwards	371	24.6	N/A
Majority		765	50.8	N/A
Turnout		1,507	58.4	N/A
Conservative hold		Swing		

==== November 1927 ====
1927
Party	Candidate	Votes	%	±%
Conservative	A. C. Gardner	744	51.9	−23.5
Liberal	W. Barton*	689	48.1	N/A
Majority		55	3.8	−47.0
Turnout		1,433	55.2	−3.2
Conservative gain from Liberal		Swing		

==== November 1928 ====
1928
Party	Candidate	Votes	%	±%
Conservative	T. R. Hewlett*	931	93.2	+41.3
Residents	A. R. Edwards	68	6.8	N/A
Majority		863	86.4	+82.6
Turnout		999	39.1	−16.1
Conservative hold		Swing		

==== March 1929 (by-election) ====
By-election: 19 March 1929
Party	Candidate	Votes	%	±%
Conservative	H. Dunks	704	48.2	−45.0
Independent	J. E. Burgess	593	40.6	N/A
Labour	A. Titt	149	10.2	N/A
Residents	A. R. Edwards	15	1.0	−5.8
Majority		111	7.6	−78.8
Turnout		1,461	57.2	+18.1
Conservative hold		Swing		

==== November 1929 ====
1929
Party	Candidate	Votes	%	±%
Liberal	M. A. Gibbons	900	54.9	N/A
Conservative	J. E. Burgess	740	45.1	−48.1
Majority		160	9.8	
Turnout		1,640	61.6	+22.5
Liberal gain from Conservative		Swing		

=== Elections in 1930s ===
==== May 1930 (by-election) ====
By-election: 30 May 1930
Party	Candidate	Votes	%	±%
Conservative	J. E. Burgess	768	45.7	+0.6
Liberal	F. E. Tylecote	718	42.7	−12.2
Labour	L. M. Lever	194	11.6	N/A
Majority		50	3.0	
Turnout		1,680	63.1	+1.5
Conservative hold		Swing		

==== November 1930 ====
1930
Party	Candidate	Votes	%	±%
Conservative	J. E. Burgess*	1,131	85.6	+40.5
Labour	W. R. Watson	190	14.4	N/A
Majority		941	71.2	
Turnout		1,321		
Conservative hold		Swing		

==== May 1931 (by-election) ====
By-election: 19 May 1931
Party	Candidate	Votes	%	±%
Liberal	F. E. Tylecote	885	57.6	N/A
Conservative	G. Egerton Pollitt	644	41.9	−43.7
Residents	A. R. Edwards	11	0.7	N/A
Majority		241	15.7	
Turnout		1,537		
Liberal gain from Conservative		Swing		

==== November 1931 ====
1931
Party	Candidate	Votes	%	±%
Liberal	F. E. Tylecote*	uncontested		
Liberal hold		Swing		

==== November 1932 ====
1932
Party	Candidate	Votes	%	±%
Liberal	M. A. Gibbons*	uncontested		
Liberal hold		Swing		

==== November 1933 ====
1933
Party	Candidate	Votes	%	±%
Conservative	J. E. Burgess*	uncontested		
Conservative hold		Swing		

==== November 1934 ====
1934
Party	Candidate	Votes	%	±%
Liberal	F. E. Tylecote*	uncontested		
Liberal hold		Swing		

==== November 1935 ====
1935
Party	Candidate	Votes	%	±%
Liberal	M. A. Gibbons*	uncontested		
Liberal hold		Swing		

==== November 1936 ====
1936
Party	Candidate	Votes	%	±%
Conservative	J. E. Burgess*	uncontested		
Conservative hold		Swing		

==== November 1937 ====
1937
Party	Candidate	Votes	%	±%
Liberal	F. E. Tylecote*	uncontested		
Liberal hold		Swing		

==== November 1938 ====
1938
Party	Candidate	Votes	%	±%
Liberal	M. A. Gibbons*	uncontested		
Liberal hold		Swing		

=== Elections in 1940s ===
==== November 1945 ====
1945 (2 vacancies)
Party	Candidate	Votes	%	±%
Conservative	J. E. Burgess*	598	63.2	N/A
Conservative	H. Harker	515	54.4	N/A
Labour	J. Clarkson	208	22.0	N/A
Labour	F. Wain	189	20.0	N/A
Liberal	G. Davies*	141	14.9	N/A
Liberal	F. E. Doran	115	11.9	N/A
Majority		307	32.4	
Turnout		947	55.4	
Conservative hold		Swing		
Conservative gain from Liberal		Swing		

==== November 1946 ====
1946
Party	Candidate	Votes	%	±%
Conservative	F. E. Tylecote*	539	62.4	−0.8
Liberal	L. J. Fallon	208	24.1	+9.2
Labour	N. Randolph	117	13.5	−8.5
Majority		331	38.3	+5.9
Turnout		864		
Conservative hold		Swing		

==== November 1947 ====
1947
Party	Candidate	Votes	%	±%
Conservative	H. Harker*	726	82.7	+20.3
Labour	J. Fern	152	17.3	+3.8
Majority		574	65.4	+27.1
Turnout		878		
Conservative hold		Swing		

==== May 1949 ====
1949
Party	Candidate	Votes	%	±%
Conservative	J. E. Burgess*	uncontested		
Conservative hold		Swing		

==== June 1949 (by-election) ====
By-election: 28 June 1949
Party	Candidate	Votes	%	±%
Conservative	J. McGrath	631	67.8	N/A
Labour	P. Roddy	299	32.2	N/A
Majority		332	35.6	N/A
Turnout		930		
Conservative hold		Swing		

== See also ==
- Manchester City Council
- Manchester City Council elections
