= 1921 Manchester City Council election =

Local election in Manchester

- 1 November 1921

35 of 140 seats on Manchester City Council 71 seats needed for a majority
	First party	Second party	Third party
Party	Conservative	Liberal	Labour
Last election	16 seats, 36.6%	9 seats, 18.7%	7 seats, 31.1%
Seats before	63	38	33
Seats won	23	5	5
Seats after	72	33	30
Seat change	▲9	▼5	▼3
Popular vote	69,290	19,814	36,813
Percentage	48.8%	14.0%	25.9%
Swing	▲12.2%	▼4.7%	▼5.2%
	Fourth party
Party	Independent
Last election	2 seats, 7.6%
Seats before	4
Seats won	2
Seats after	5
Seat change	▲1
Popular vote	12,922
Percentage	9.1%
Swing	▲1.5%
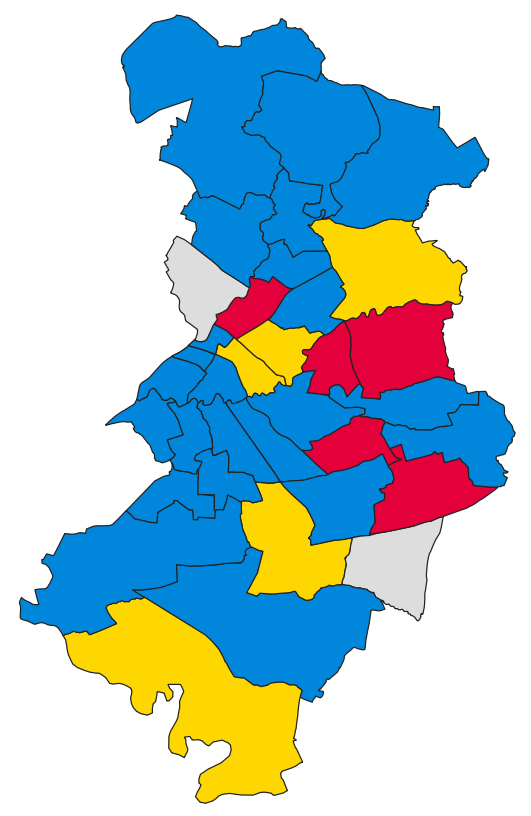
- Map of results of 1921 election
Leader of the Council before election
No overall control
Leader of the Council after election
Conservative

Elections to Manchester City Council were held on Tuesday, 1 November 1921. One third of the councillors seats were up for election, with each successful candidate to serve a three-year term of office. The Conservative Party gained overall control of the council from no overall control.

== Election result ==
Party	Votes		Seats			Full Council	
Conservative Party	69,290 (48.8%)	▲12.2	23 (65.7%)	23 / 35	▲9	72 (51.4%)	72 / 140
Liberal Party	19,814 (14.0%)	▼4.7	5 (14.3%)	5 / 35	▼5	33 (23.6%)	33 / 140
Labour Party	36,813 (25.9%)	▼5.2	5 (14.3%)	5 / 35	▼3	30 (21.4%)	30 / 140
Independent	12,922 (9.1%)	▲1.5	2 (5.7%)	2 / 35	Steady	5 (3.6%)	5 / 140
National Unemployed Workers' Movement	1,224 (0.9%)	N/A	0 (0.0%)	0 / 35	N/A	0 (0.0%)	0 / 140
Independent Labour	1,210 (0.9%)	N/A	0 (0.0%)	0 / 35	▼1	0 (0.0%)	0 / 140
Communist	666 (0.5%)	N/A	0 (0.0%)	0 / 35	N/A	0 (0.0%)	0 / 140

=== Full council ===
↓
30	33	5	72

== Ward results ==
=== All Saints' ===
All Saints'
Party	Candidate	Votes	%	±%
Conservative	E. Pierce*	1,616	51.3	+5.0
Labour	G. Benson	1,537	48.7	+25.6
Majority		79	2.6	
Turnout		3,153	40.3	+0.7
Conservative hold		Swing		

=== Ardwick ===
Ardwick
Party	Candidate	Votes	%	±%
Conservative	M. L. K. Jones	2,536	51.8	−18.4
Labour	R. C. Wallhead*	2,363	48.2	+18.4
Majority		173	3.4	−37.0
Turnout		4,899	48.0	+12.4
Conservative gain from Labour		Swing		

=== Beswick ===
Beswick
Party	Candidate	Votes	%	±%
Labour	L. B. Cox	3,490	58.1	+1.0
Conservative	J. Fiddiham	2,618	42.9	−1.0
Majority		872	14.2	+2.0
Turnout		6,108	53.8	10.1
Labour hold		Swing		

=== Blackley ===
Blackley
Party	Candidate	Votes	%	±%
Conservative	J. E. Littler	2,651	66.5	N/A
Labour	A. Robinson	1,333	33.5	N/A
Majority		1,318	33.0	
Turnout		3,984	51.1	+14.2
Conservative gain from Labour		Swing		

=== Bradford ===
Bradford
Party	Candidate	Votes	%	±%
Labour	J. Binns*	2,875	58.0	N/A
Conservative	A. Ward	2,084	42.0	N/A
Majority		791	16.0	N/A
Turnout		4,959	52.3	N/A
Labour hold		Swing		

=== Cheetham ===
Cheetham
Party	Candidate	Votes	%	±%
Conservative	A. Whitworth*	2,694	61.7	N/A
Labour	C. Kean	1,671	38.3	+3.2
Majority		1,023	23.4	
Turnout		4,365	53.9	+0.4
Conservative hold		Swing		

=== Chorlton-cum-Hardy ===
Chorlton-cum-Hardy
Party	Candidate	Votes	%	±%
Conservative	J. Lees-Jones	3,526	56.3	N/A
Liberal	J. Redford*	2,742	43.7	N/A
Majority		784	12.6	N/A
Turnout		6,268	48.7	N/A
Conservative gain from Liberal		Swing		

=== Collegiate Church ===
Collegiate Church
Party	Candidate	Votes	%	±%
Independent	D. Gouldman	1,544	63.5	+26.8
Conservative	T. R. Hewlett*	887	36.5	0.2
Majority		657	27.0	
Turnout		2,431	72.1	+9.9
Independent gain from Conservative		Swing		

=== Collyhurst ===
Collyhurst
Party	Candidate	Votes	%	±%
Conservative	J. R. Midgley	3,081	58.7	N/A
Liberal	H. Lee*	2,168	41.3	N/A
Majority		913	17.4	
Turnout		5,249	59.0	+38.9
Conservative gain from Liberal		Swing		

=== Crumpsall ===
Crumpsall
Party	Candidate	Votes	%	±%
Conservative	F. J. Robertshaw*	1,594	56.7	+15.8
Liberal	H. Wagon	1,215	43.3	+7.1
Majority		379	13.4	+8.7
Turnout		2,809	58.2	−5.6
Conservative hold		Swing		

=== Didsbury ===
Didsbury
Party	Candidate	Votes	%	±%
Liberal	J. Swarbrick*	1,620	51.2	N/A
Conservative	F. Stapleton	1,546	48.8	−31.9
Majority		74	2.4	
Turnout		3,166	59.0	+4.7
Liberal hold		Swing		

=== Exchange ===
Exchange
Party	Candidate	Votes	%	±%
Conservative	G. Westcott*	690	66.8	N/A
Liberal	J. Lyons	343	33.2	N/A
Majority		347	33.6	
Turnout		1,033	58.1	+21.7
Conservative hold		Swing		

=== Gorton North ===
Gorton North
Party	Candidate	Votes	%	±%
Conservative	W. Docker	2,216	36.9	N/A
Labour	A. Mason	1,748	29.1	N/A
Independent Labour	J. P. Greenall*	1,210	20.1	N/A
National Unemployed Workers' Movement	J. Shaw	839	14.0	N/A
Majority		468	7.8	N/A
Turnout		6,013	60.7	N/A
Conservative gain from Independent Labour		Swing		

=== Gorton South ===
Gorton South
Party	Candidate	Votes	%	±%
Labour	S. Hague*	3,372	58.0	+6.2
Conservative	W. S. Wilson	2,060	35.4	−12.8
National Unemployed Workers' Movement	P. H. Kealy	385	6.6	N/A
Majority		1,312	22.6	+19.1
Turnout		5,817	62.5	+17.2
Labour hold		Swing		

=== Harpurhey ===
Harpurhey
Party	Candidate	Votes	%	±%
Conservative	W. Gilgryst*	2,575	54.2	+12.9
Labour	A. E. Wolstenholme	2,135	44.9	+17.4
Independent	G. A. Jones	44	0.9	N/A
Majority		440	9.3	−4.5
Turnout		4,754	49.2	−7.5
Conservative hold		Swing		

=== Levenshulme ===
Levenshulme
Party	Candidate	Votes	%	±%
Independent	R. S. Harper*	3,728	84.6	+21.4
Labour	W. H. Depledge	678	15.4	−21.4
Majority		3,050	69.2	+42.9
Turnout		4,406	48.8	−5.4
Independent hold		Swing		

=== Longsight ===
Longsight
Party	Candidate	Votes	%	±%
Conservative	A. Jennison*	2,661	61.3	−0.2
Liberal	A. L. Taylor	1,678	38.7	N/A
Majority		983	22.6	−0.4
Turnout		4,339	50.1	−7.8
Conservative hold		Swing		

=== Medlock Street ===
Medlock Street
Party	Candidate	Votes	%	±%
Conservative	S. Woollam*	4,090	68.8	−3.7
Liberal	F. H. Earley	1,654	27.8	N/A
Independent	M. Healey	205	3.4	N/A
Majority		2,436	41.0	−4.0
Turnout		5,949	51.1	+6.1
Conservative hold		Swing		

=== Miles Platting ===
Miles Platting
Party	Candidate	Votes	%	±%
Conservative	S. Bloor	3,281	55.7	+15.0
Labour	J. Fogarty*	2,607	44.3	−15.0
Majority		674	11.4	
Turnout		5,888	61.6	+9.2
Conservative gain from Labour		Swing		

=== Moss Side East ===
Moss Side East
Party	Candidate	Votes	%	±%
Conservative	W. Millward	2,008	51.0	+6.7
Independent	D. S. Bloomfield	1,813	46.0	N/A
Independent	A. R. Edwards	120	3.0	N/A
Majority		195	5.0	+1.4
Turnout		3,941	51.5	+18.9
Conservative gain from Independent		Swing		

=== Moss Side West ===
Moss Side West
Party	Candidate	Votes	%	±%
Conservative	T. Dunham	2,600	50.8	+21.1
Independent	J. S. Whitehead	2,523	49.2	N/A
Majority		77	1.6	
Turnout		5,123	59.5	+18.2
Conservative gain from Liberal		Swing		

=== Moston ===
Moston
Party	Candidate	Votes	%	±%
Conservative	B. Frankland	2,676	55.0	+2.4
Labour	F. Gregson*	2,188	45.0	N/A
Majority		488	10.0	+4.8
Turnout		5,864	56.4	+16.8
Conservative gain from Labour		Swing		

=== New Cross ===
New Cross
Party	Candidate	Votes	%	±%
Liberal	J. Milner*	2,054	52.1	N/A
Conservative	O. R. Whittaker	1,886	47.9	−12.7
Majority		168	4.2	
Turnout		3,940	42.2	−11.0
Liberal hold		Swing		

=== Newton Heath ===
Newton Heath
Party	Candidate	Votes	%	±%
Liberal	C. W. Godbert*	2,743	59.2	N/A
Labour	H. Thorneycroft	1,890	40.8	+3.9
Majority		853	18.4	
Turnout		5,067	58.1	−6.2
Liberal hold		Swing		

=== Openshaw ===
Openshaw
Party	Candidate	Votes	%	±%
Conservative	H. D. Judson*	2,967	51.4	+2.9
Labour	J. Brown	2,135	37.0	−14.5
Communist	J. Dickson	666	11.5	N/A
Majority		832	14.4	
Turnout		5,498	62.5	+26.1
Conservative hold		Swing		

=== Oxford ===
Oxford
Party	Candidate	Votes	%	±%
Conservative	O. P. Lancashire*	uncontested		
Conservative hold		Swing		

=== Rusholme ===
Rusholme
Party	Candidate	Votes	%	±%
Liberal	W. Flinn	2,007	56.4	+9.5
Conservative	J. Parkinson*	1,550	43.6	+14.6
Majority		457	12.8	−5.1
Turnout		3,557	44.2	+4.6
Liberal gain from Conservative		Swing		

=== St. Ann's ===
St. Ann's
Party	Candidate	Votes	%	±%
Conservative	E. B. Beesley	649	54.5	N/A
Independent	R. B. Batty	542	45.5	N/A
Majority		107	9.0	N/A
Turnout		1,191	49.3	N/A
Conservative gain from Liberal		Swing		

=== St. Clement's ===
St. Clement's
Party	Candidate	Votes	%	±%
Liberal	W. Melland*	uncontested		
Liberal hold		Swing		

=== St. George's ===
St. George's
Party	Candidate	Votes	%	±%
Conservative	J. H. Swales*	3,613	74.3	+30.0
Independent	S. Finnigan	1,250	25.7	N/A
Majority		2,363	48.6	+35.1
Turnout		4,982	44.6	+7.8
Conservative hold		Swing		

=== St. John's ===
St. John's
Party	Candidate	Votes	%	±%
Conservative	J. Bayliss*	709	50.6	N/A
Liberal	H. S. Ashburner	692	49.4	N/A
Majority		17	1.2	N/A
Turnout		1,401	53.3	N/A
Conservative hold		Swing		

=== St. Luke's ===
St. Luke's
Party	Candidate	Votes	%	±%
Conservative	T. H. Hinchcliffe*	2,432	57.1	N/A
Labour Co-op	J. H. Alsop	1,828	42.9	+7.3
Majority		604	14.2	
Turnout		4,260	43.0	+8.1
Conservative hold		Swing		

=== St. Mark's ===
St. Mark's
Party	Candidate	Votes	%	±%
Labour	I. Brassington	2,652	46.9	+13.9
Conservative	W. P. Jackson	2,030	35.9	N.A
Liberal	G. Jennison*	972	17.2	N/A
Majority		622	11.0	
Turnout		5,642	56.9	−6.2
Labour gain from Liberal		Swing		

=== St. Michael's ===
St. Michael's
Party	Candidate	Votes	%	±%
Labour	T. Cassidy*	2,311	50.4	−9.6
Conservative	G. H. Dale	2,274	49.6	+9.6
Majority		37	0.8	−19.2
Turnout		4,585	74.4	+8.1
Labour hold		Swing		

=== Withington ===
Withington
Party	Candidate	Votes	%	±%
Conservative	J. Mellor	1,490	56.4	N/A
Independent	E. Brown	1,153	43.6	N/A
Majority		337	12.8	
Turnout		2,643	46.6	+1.7
Conservative gain from Liberal		Swing		

== By-elections between 1921 and 1922 ==
=== Blackley, 8 November 1921 ===
Caused by the resignation of Councillor J. D. Canavan (Labour, Blackley, elected 1 November 1919) on 26 October 1921.

Blackley
Party	Candidate	Votes	%	±%
Liberal	W. Bentley	2,302	68.6	N/A
Labour	E. Whiteley	1,054	31.4	−2.1
Majority		1,248	37.2	
Turnout		3,356		
Liberal gain from Labour		Swing		

=== St. Ann's, 16 May 1922 ===
Caused by the resignation of Councillor F. M. S. Grant (Conservative, St. Ann's, elected 1 November 1913) on 3 May 1922.

St. Ann's
Party	Candidate	Votes	%	±%
Conservative	R. A. Larmuth	uncontested		
Conservative hold		Swing		
