= Ronald F. Tylecote =

British archaeologist and metallurgist

Ronald Frank Tylecote (15 June 1916 – 17 June 1990) was a British archaeologist and metallurgist, generally recognised as the founder of the sub-discipline of archaeometallurgy.

== Education and profession ==
The son of doctor Frank Edward Tylecote, he was born in Manchester and educated at Oundle School. He obtained an MA from Trinity Hall, Cambridge in 1938, and an MSc from the University of Manchester in 1942, and a PhD on the oxidation of copper from the University of London in 1952.

After a period in industry working as a welding research engineer, he became an ICI Research Fellow at University of London. In 1953 he was appointed as a lecturer at Newcastle University, where he became a Reader in Archaeometallurgy, a post from which he retired in September 1978. In 1976 he began teaching Archaeometallurgy at the Institute of Archaeology, University College London, which led to him becoming an honorary Professor there in 1979.

== Work ==
His early publications on metallurgy include The solid phase welding of metals (1968). He participated in his first archaeological excavation in 1939, and became known for combining the two interests. Tylecote investigated early mining and smelting sites around the world, including Timna in Israel and the Roman silver mines of Rio Tinto in Spain. He also excavated sites in Sudan, Nigeria, Turkey, Iran and Afghanistan. A notable study was the Wertime Pyrometallurgical Expedition of 1968.

Other work included Metallurgy in Archaeology: a Prehistory of Metallurgy in the British Isles (1962), which became the standard reference work, and The Early History of Metallurgy in Europe(1987). In 1976 he published A History of Metallurgy, and completed the revised second edition just before his death.

In 1962, with G. R. Morton, he founded the Historical Metallurgy Group, initially as a group within the Iron and Steel Institute, and edited its first Bulletin, published in April 1963. He remained its editor for the rest of his life, as the group became the Historical Metallurgy Society, and the Bulletin became a journal, Historical Metallurgy.

He is commemorated in the R. F. Tylecote Library of Archaeometallurgical Literature at University College, London, the R. F. Tylecote Fund at the same institution, and in the grant-giving R. F. Tylecote Memorial Fund of the Historical Metallurgy Society. Following his death the Society published tributes to him from other scholars with whom he had worked, together with a list of his publications.

== Archives ==
Tylecote's academic papers are held by the Historical Metallurgy Society: calendar. His slag samples are also held by the Historical Metallurgy Society.

== Personal life ==
Having originally married Angela (née Lias, daughter of journalist and writer Godfrey Lias) whom he divorced in 1950, he married his second wife, Elizabeth Cornelia Johanna (née Reventlow) in 1958. Elizabeth was born in the city of Sønderborg in 1912, which was then part of Schleswig-Holstein, but became part of Denmark after 1918. Having been born in Sønderborg Castle, she had previously changed her name to Berndt, to avoid association with pro-Nazi elements of the aristocratic Reventlow family, and spent much of World War II in Palestine and Egypt. Both Ronald and Elizabeth Tylecote maintained pro-Communist sympathies until the Russian invasion of Hungary in 1956. His son, Andrew Tylecote is an economist.
