= 1928 Manchester City Council election =

Local election in Manchester

- 1 November 1928

35 of 140 seats on Manchester City Council 71 seats needed for a majority
	First party	Second party	Third party
Party	Conservative	Labour	Liberal
Last election	14 seats, 38.6%	13 seats, 32.4%	6 seats, 24.3%
Seats before	64	46	26
Seats won	13	14	7
Seats after	61	47	28
Seat change	▼3	▲1	▲2
Popular vote	63,622	63,190	24,119
Percentage	40.9%	40.6%	15.5%
Swing	▲2.3%	▲8.2%	▼8.8%
	Fourth party
Party	Independent
Last election	1 seats, 2.3%
Seats before	3
Seats won	1
Seats after	3
Seat change	Steady
Popular vote	1,815
Percentage	1.2%
Swing	▼1.1%
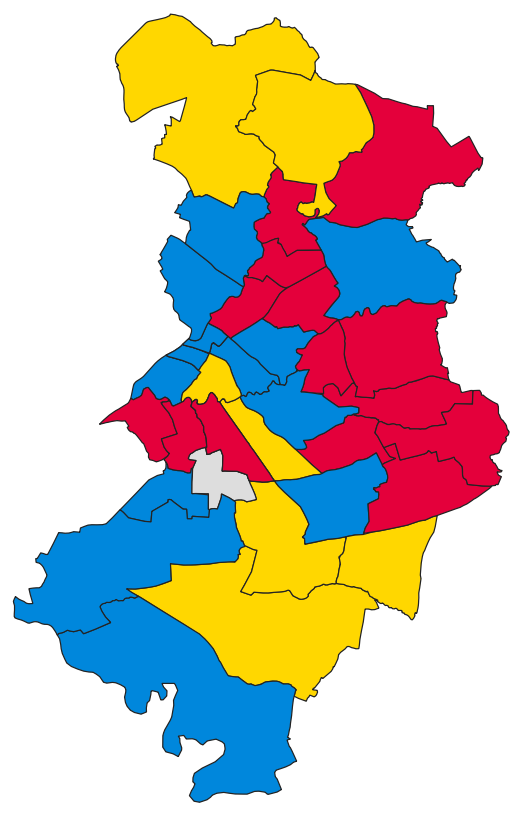
- Map of results of 1928 election
Leader of the Council before election
No overall control
Leader of the Council after election
No overall control

Elections to Manchester City Council were held on Thursday, 1 November 1928. One third of the councillors seats were up for election, with each successful candidate to serve a three-year term of office. The council remained under no overall control.

== Election result ==
Party	Votes		Seats			Full Council	
Conservative Party	63,622 (40.9%)	▲2.3	13 (37.1%)	13 / 35	▼3	61 (43.6%)	61 / 140
Labour Party	63,190 (40.6%)	▲8.2	14 (40.0%)	14 / 35	▲1	47 (33.6%)	47 / 140
Liberal Party	24,119 (15.5%)	▼8.8	7 (20.0%)	7 / 35	▲2	28 (20.0%)	28 / 140
Independent	1,815 (1.2%)	▼1.1	1 (2.9%)	1 / 35	Steady	3 (2.1%)	3 / 140
English League for the Taxation of Land Values	0 (0.0%)	▼1.8	0 (0.0%)	0 / 35	Steady	1 (0.7%)	1 / 140
Residents	1,298 (0.8%)	▲0.6	0 (0.0%)	0 / 35	Steady	0 (0.0%)	0 / 140
Independent Conservative	977 (0.6%)	N/A	0 (0.0%)	0 / 35	N/A	0 (0.0%)	0 / 140
Co-operative Party	270 (0.2%)	N/A	0 (0.0%)	0 / 35	N/A	0 (0.0%)	0 / 140
Communist	193 (0.1%)	▼0.1	0 (0.0%)	0 / 35	Steady	0 (0.0%)	0 / 140

=== Full council ===
↓
47	28	1	3	61

=== Aldermen ===
↓
3	10	1	21

=== Councillors ===
↓
44	18	1	2	40

== Ward results ==
=== All Saints' ===
All Saints'
Party	Candidate	Votes	%	±%
Labour	J. E. Hutchinson*	1,959	51.7	+23.1
Conservative	F. Earley	1,788	47.2	0
Residents	A. R. Edwards	39	1.0	−0.1
Majority		171	4.5	
Turnout		3,786	45.5	+2.0
Labour hold		Swing		

=== Ardwick ===
Ardwick
Party	Candidate	Votes	%	±%
Conservative	J. Whittle	3,495	56.1	+0.9
Labour	W. McMullan	2,713	43.6	−1.2
Residents	A. R. Edwards	17	0.3	N/A
Majority		782	12.5	+2.1
Turnout		6,225	60.5	+4.5
Conservative gain from Labour		Swing		

=== Beswick ===
Beswick
Party	Candidate	Votes	%	±%
Labour	H. Thorneycroft*	4,946	62.7	−0.9
Conservative	G. Southward	2,937	37.3	+0.9
Majority		2,009	25.4	−1.8
Turnout		7,883	64.8	+5.8
Labour hold		Swing		

=== Blackley ===
Blackley
Party	Candidate	Votes	%	±%
Liberal	W. Bentley*	2,714	61.3	N/A
Labour	W. Slack	1,536	34.7	N/A
Residents	J. A. P. Holmes	175	4.0	N/A
Majority		1,178	26.6	N/A
Turnout		4,425	45.9	N/A
Liberal hold		Swing		

=== Bradford ===
Bradford
Party	Candidate	Votes	%	±%
Labour	J. W. Sutton*	3,901	54.9	N/A
Conservative	F. J. Riley	3,181	44.8	N/A
Residents	W. T. Kilgariff	23	0.3	N/A
Majority		720	10.1	N/A
Turnout		7,105	66.8	N/A
Labour hold		Swing		

=== Cheetham ===
Cheetham
Party	Candidate	Votes	%	±%
Conservative	J. C. Kidd*	uncontested		
Conservative hold		Swing		

=== Chorlton-cum-Hardy ===
Chorlton-cum-Hardy
Party	Candidate	Votes	%	±%
Conservative	W. T. Burrows*	4,788	46.7	+9.3
Liberal	S. F. Wicks	3,955	38.6	−22.7
Labour	A. McIlwrick	1,457	14.2	N/A
Residents	N. E. Walker	51	0.5	N/A
Majority		833	8.1	
Turnout		10,251	54.0	+0.8
Conservative hold		Swing		

=== Collegiate Church ===
Collegiate Church
Party	Candidate	Votes	%	±%
Conservative	J. Elliott*	1,067	65.7	N/A
Labour	P. Goldstone	558	34.3	N/A
Majority		509	31.4	
Turnout		1,625	43.3	−6.9
Conservative hold		Swing		

=== Collyhurst ===
Collyhurst
Party	Candidate	Votes	%	±%
Labour	R. Malcolm	3,078	51.3	−5.5
Conservative	F. Brine*	2,839	47.3	+4.1
Communist	G. W. Chandler	66	1.1	N/A
Residents	J. F. Gavin	16	0.3	N/A
Majority		239	4.0	−9.6
Turnout		5,999	64.1	+8.1
Labour gain from Conservative		Swing		

=== Crumpsall ===
Crumpsall
Party	Candidate	Votes	%	±%
Liberal	J. E. W. Booth	2,207	59.7	N/A
Conservative	W. Dennison*	1,488	40.3	N/A
Majority		719	19.4	N/A
Turnout		3,695	57.4	N/A
Liberal gain from Conservative		Swing		

=== Didsbury ===
Didsbury
Party	Candidate	Votes	%	±%
Conservative	S. P. Dawson	2,060	51.0	−0.1
Liberal	D. Porter	1,979	49.0	+0.1
Majority		81	2.0	−0.2
Turnout		4,039	56.8	+2.4
Conservative hold		Swing		

=== Exchange ===
Exchange
Party	Candidate	Votes	%	±%
Conservative	G. L. Hardcastle*	534	53.0	N/A
Liberal	W. A. Nixon	474	47.0	N/A
Majority		60	6.0	N/A
Turnout		1,008	61.4	N/A
Conservative hold		Swing		

=== Gorton North ===
Gorton North
Party	Candidate	Votes	%	±%
Labour	T. F. Regan*	uncontested		
Labour hold		Swing		

=== Gorton South ===
Gorton South
Party	Candidate	Votes	%	±%
Labour	A. Lee*	3,960	66.0	−0.5
Conservative	A. Ireland	1,985	33.1	N/A
Residents	A. Owen	55	0.9	N/A
Majority		1,975	32.9	−1.0
Turnout		6,000	53.7	+7.3
Labour hold		Swing		

=== Harpurhey ===
Harpurhey
Party	Candidate	Votes	%	±%
Labour	R. Lundy*	3,230	53.5	+2.2
Conservative	C. F. Howarth	2,719	45.0	−3.7
Residents	J. A. P. Holmes	91	1.5	N/A
Majority		511	8.5	+5.9
Turnout		6,040	61.1	+8.6
Labour hold		Swing		

=== Levenshulme ===
Levenshulme
Party	Candidate	Votes	%	±%
Liberal	C. R. de la Wyche*	2,987	65.5	N/A
Labour	W. N. Bayes	1,272	27.9	N/A
Co-operative Party	E. C. Arundale	270	5.9	N/A
Residents	E. Walker	32	0.7	N/A
Majority		1,715	37.6	N/A
Turnout		4,288	47.4	N/A
Liberal hold		Swing		

=== Longsight ===
Longsight
Party	Candidate	Votes	%	±%
Conservative	W. Cundiff*	3,466	62.3	−1.6
Labour	F. Gregson	2,069	37.2	N/A
Residents	N. E. Walker	24	0.4	N/A
Majority		1,397	25.1	−2.7
Turnout		5,559	53.8	+12.9
Conservative hold		Swing		

=== Medlock Street ===
Medlock Street
Party	Candidate	Votes	%	±%
Labour	F. K. Edwards	2,677	50.5	−12.8
Conservative	C. H. S. Redmond*	2,473	46.8	+11.1
Residents	A. R. Edwards	148	2.8	N/A
Majority		204	3.9	−23.7
Turnout		5,298	45.4	+2.7
Labour gain from Conservative		Swing		

=== Miles Platting ===
Miles Platting
Party	Candidate	Votes	%	±%
Labour	D. Taylor*	3,751	55.3	−0.3
Conservative	S. Bloor	2,997	44.2	−0.2
Residents	A. R. Edwards	34	0.5	N/A
Majority		754	11.1	−0.1
Turnout		5,772	66.1	+1.7
Labour hold		Swing		

=== Moss Side East ===
Moss Side East
Party	Candidate	Votes	%	±%
Independent	E. Hales*	1,815	47.8	N/A
Conservative	R. Ridyard	1,373	36.2	−1.5
Labour	J. Owen	571	15.0	N/A
Residents	A. R. Edwards	36	0.9	−2.1
Majority		442	11.6	
Turnout		3,795	48.6	+2.2
Independent hold		Swing		

=== Moss Side West ===
Moss Side West
Party	Candidate	Votes	%	±%
Conservative	R. Pepperdine*	2,502	68.6	+21.8
Labour	R. McKeon	1,100	30.2	N/A
Residents	A. R. Edwards	45	1.2	N/A
Majority		1,402	38.4	
Turnout		3,647	41.6	−1.5
Conservative hold		Swing		

=== Moston ===
Moston
Party	Candidate	Votes	%	±%
Labour	W. R. Mellor*	3,325	56.2	+21.1
Conservative	C. Roberts	2,561	43.3	+7.6
Residents	E. Walker	34	0.6	N/A
Majority		764	12.9	
Turnout		5,920	58.4	−4.4
Labour hold		Swing		

=== New Cross ===
New Cross
Party	Candidate	Votes	%	±%
Conservative	S. Fitton	3,504	53.7	+10.2
Labour	T. M. Larrad*	3,025	46.3	−10.2
Majority		479	7.4	
Turnout		6,529	65.0	+6.2
Conservative gain from Labour		Swing		

=== Newton Heath ===
Newton Heath
Party	Candidate	Votes	%	±%
Conservative	H. F. Robinson*	2,855	50.7	N/A
Labour	A. N. Dooley	2,746	48.7	+8.8
Residents	J. A. P. Holmes	33	0.6	N/A
Majority		109	2.0	
Turnout		5,634	59.8	+4.9
Conservative hold		Swing		

=== Openshaw ===
Openshaw
Party	Candidate	Votes	%	±%
Labour	J. Toole*	4,081	72.6	N/A
Conservative	J. Culshaw	1,389	24.7	N/A
Communist	A. Jackson	127	2.3	N/A
Residents	J. F. Gavin	25	0.4	N/A
Majority		2,692	47.9	N/A
Turnout		5,622	58.4	N/A
Labour hold		Swing		

=== Oxford ===
Oxford
Party	Candidate	Votes	%	±%
Liberal	R. Noton Barclay*	806	97.3	N/A
Residents	A. R. Edwards	22	2.7	N/A
Majority		784	94.6	N/A
Turnout		4,625	828	N/A
Liberal hold		Swing		

=== Rusholme ===
Rusholme
Party	Candidate	Votes	%	±%
Liberal	E. F. M. Sutton*	2,496	58.2	+6.2
Ind. Conservative	M. Hilditch	977	22.8	N/A
Labour	E. Beavan	803	18.7	N/A
Residents	N. E. Walker	12	0.3	N/A
Majority		1,519	35.4	+31.4
Turnout		4,288	47.0	−4.1
Liberal hold		Swing		

=== St. Ann's ===
St. Ann's
Party	Candidate	Votes	%	±%
Conservative	E. Green*	uncontested		
Conservative hold		Swing		

=== St. Clement's ===
St. Clement's
Party	Candidate	Votes	%	±%
Conservative	H. D. Judson*	794	37.2	+5.5
Liberal	B. McManus	692	32.4	−17.0
Labour	A. E. Jones	649	30.4	+11.9
Majority		102	4.8	
Turnout		2,135	68.8	+3.4
Conservative hold		Swing		

=== St. George's ===
St. George's
Party	Candidate	Votes	%	±%
Labour	E. Hope*	2,616	58.3	+9.2
Conservative	C. E. Goolden	1,813	40.4	+10.7
Residents	A. R. Edwards	60	1.3	N/A
Majority		803	17.9	−1.5
Turnout		4,489	39.3	−7.3
Labour hold		Swing		

=== St. John's ===
St. John's
Party	Candidate	Votes	%	±%
Conservative	T. R. Hewlett*	931	93.2	+41.3
Residents	A. R. Edwards	68	6.8	N/A
Majority		863	86.4	+82.6
Turnout		999	39.1	−16.1
Conservative hold		Swing		

=== St. Luke's ===
St. Luke's
Party	Candidate	Votes	%	±%
Liberal	T. R. Ackroyd*	2,583	55.1	+26.5
Conservative	R. Harrison	1,478	31.5	−19.4
Labour	L. C. Walker	499	10.6	N/A
Residents	E. Walker	117	2.5	+2.0
Majority		1,105	23.6	
Turnout		4,632	46.1	+5.7
Liberal hold		Swing		

=== St. Mark's ===
St. Mark's
Party	Candidate	Votes	%	±%
Labour	G. Hall*	4,002	67.8	N/A
Conservative	E. Filmer	1,834	31.1	N/A
Residents	E. Walker	64	1.1	N/A
Majority		2,168	36.7	N/A
Turnout		5,901	68.1	N/A
Labour hold		Swing		

=== St. Michael's ===
St. Michael's
Party	Candidate	Votes	%	±%
Labour	A. Cathcart	2,666	60.7	−2.2
Conservative	G. H. Dale*	1,729	39.3	+2.2
Majority		937	21.4	−4.4
Turnout		4,395	65.4	+21.8
Labour gain from Conservative		Swing		

=== Withington ===
Withington
Party	Candidate	Votes	%	±%
Liberal	T. Davis	3,226	50.8	−5.5
Conservative	W. Challoner*	3,042	47.9	+4.2
Residents	N. E. Walker	77	1.2	N/A
Majority		184	2.9	−9.7
Turnout		6,345	47.3	−2.7
Liberal gain from Conservative		Swing		

== Aldermanic elections ==
=== Aldermanic election, 6 March 1929 ===
Caused by the death on 2 February 1929 of Alderman Walter Harwood (Conservative, elected as an alderman by the council on 9 November 1904).

In his place, Councillor Isaac Hinchliffe (Conservative, St. John's, elected 1 November 1910) was elected as an alderman by the council on 6 March 1929.

Party	Alderman	Ward	Term expires
Conservative	Isaac Hinchliffe	Didsbury	1934

=== Aldermanic elections, 1 May 1929 ===
Caused by the death on 8 April 1929 of Alderman Dr. A. W. Chapman (Conservative, elected as an alderman by the council on 4 August 1915).

In his place, Councillor William Davy (Labour, Gorton North, elected 1 Nov 1910) was elected as an alderman by the council on 1 May 1929.

Party	Alderman	Ward	Term expires
Labour	William Davy	Medlock Street	1934

Caused by the death on 16 April 1929 of Alderman Henry Plummer (Liberal, elected as an alderman by the council on 4 December 1907).

In his place, Councillor Ernest Frederick Martin Sutton (Liberal, Rusholme, elected 27 June 1911) was elected as an alderman by the council on 1 May 1929.

Party	Alderman	Ward	Term expires
Liberal	Ernest Frederick Martin Sutton	Rusholme	1931

=== Aldermanic election, 7 August 1929 ===
Caused by the death on 28 June 1929 of Alderman Thomas Turnbull (Conservative, elected as an alderman by the council on 9 November 1904).

In his place, Councillor Ashton Whitworth (Conservative, Cheetham, elected 18 July 1911) was elected as an alderman by the council on 7 August 1929.

Party	Alderman	Ward	Term expires
Conservative	Ashton Whitworth	Withington	1934

=== Aldermanic election, 2 October 1929 ===
Caused by the death on 20 September 1929 of Alderman Harry Derwent Simpson (Conservative, elected as an alderman by the council on 7 May 1919).

In his place, Councillor Will Melland (Liberal, St. Clement's, elected 27 June 1911) was elected as an alderman by the council on 2 October 1929.

Party	Alderman	Ward	Term expires
Liberal	Will Melland	Beswick	1934

== By-elections between 1928 and 1929 ==
=== Chorlton-cum-Hardy, 20 December 1928 ===
Caused by the death of Councillor W. T. Burrows (Conservative, Chorlton-cum-Hardy, elected 2 November 1925) on 5 December 1928.

Chorlton-cum-Hardy
Party	Candidate	Votes	%	±%
Conservative	W. Somerville	2,840	51.5	+4.8
Liberal	S. Pilling	1,985	36.0	−2.6
Labour	A. McIlwrick	684	12.4	−1.8
Residents	A. R. Edwards	10	0.1	−0.4
Majority		855	15.5	+7.4
Turnout		5,519	29.1	−24.9
Conservative hold		Swing		

=== St. John's, 19 March 1929 ===
Caused by the election as an alderman of Councillor Isaac Hinchliffe (Conservative, St. John's, elected 1 November 1910) on 6 March 1929, following the death on 2 February 1929 of Alderman Walter Harwood (Conservative, elected as an alderman by the council on 9 November 1904).

St. John's
Party	Candidate	Votes	%	±%
Conservative	H. Dunks	704	48.2	−45.0
Independent	J. E. Burgess	593	40.6	N/A
Labour	A. Titt	149	10.2	N/A
Residents	A. R. Edwards	15	1.0	−5.8
Majority		111	7.6	−78.8
Turnout		1,461	57.2	+18.1
Conservative hold		Swing		

=== By-elections, 14 May 1929 ===
Two by-elections were held on 14 May 1929 to fill vacancies that were created by the appointment of aldermen on 6 June 1928.

==== Gorton North ====
Caused by the election as an alderman of Councillor William Davy (Labour, Gorton North, elected 1 November 1910) on 1 May 1929, following the death on 8 April 1929 of Alderman Dr. A. W. Chapman (Conservative, elected as an alderman by the council on 4 August 1915).

Gorton North
Party	Candidate	Votes	%	±%
Labour	S. H. Hitchbun	3,284	68.6	N/A
Conservative	G. Taylor	1,501	31.4	N/A
Majority		1,783	37.2	N/A
Turnout		4,785		
Labour hold		Swing		

==== Rusholme ====
Caused by the election as an alderman of Councillor Ernest Frederick Martin Sutton (Liberal, Rusholme, elected 27 June 1911) on 1 May 1929, following the death on 16 April 1929 of Alderman Henry Plummer (Liberal, elected as an alderman by the council on 4 December 1907).

Rusholme
Party	Candidate	Votes	%	±%
Conservative	F. A. Jackson	2,272	53.0	N/A
Liberal	A. Heywood	1,956	45.6	−12.6
Residents	A. R. Edwards	61	1.4	+1.1
Majority		316	7.4	
Turnout		4,289	47.0	0
Conservative gain from Liberal		Swing		

=== Cheetham, 20 August 1929 ===
Caused by the election as an alderman of Councillor Ashton Whitworth (Conservative, Cheetham, elected 18 July 1911) on 7 August 1929, following the death on 28 June 1929 of Alderman Thomas Turnbull (Conservative, elected as an alderman by the council on 9 November 1904).

Cheetham
Party	Candidate	Votes	%	±%
Liberal	S. Laski	1,937	46.6	N/A
Conservative	G. Grimshaw	1,512	36.3	N/A
Labour	A. McIlwrick	711	17.1	N/A
Majority		425	10.3	N/A
Turnout		4,160		
Liberal gain from Conservative		Swing		

=== St. Clement's, 15 October 1929 ===
Caused by the election as an alderman of Councillor Will Melland (Liberal, St. Clement's, elected 27 June 1911) on 2 October 1929, following the death on 20 September 1929 of Alderman Harry Derwent Simpson (Conservative, elected as an alderman by the council on 7 May 1919).

St. Clement's
Party	Candidate	Votes	%	±%
Liberal	B. McManus	684	35.8	+3.4
Labour	A. E. Jones	623	32.6	+2.2
Conservative	A. Ashton	604	31.6	−5.6
Majority		61	3.2	
Turnout		1,911	61.6	−7.2
Liberal hold		Swing		
