= 1926 Manchester City Council election =

Local election in Manchester

- 1 November 1926

35 of 140 seats on Manchester City Council 71 seats needed for a majority
| | First party | Second party | Third party |
|---|---|---|---|
| Party | Conservative | Labour | Liberal |
| Last election | 16 seats, 42.0% | 12 seats, 35.6% | 6 seats, 17.0% |
| Seats before | 74 | 34 | 28 |
| Seats won | 12 | 17 | 5 |
| Seats after | 68 | 41 | 27 |
| Seat change | ▼6 | ▲7 | ▼1 |
| Popular vote | 49,370 | 51,942 | 20,764 |
| Percentage | 40.1% | 42.2% | 16.9% |
| Swing | ▼1.9% | ▲6.6% | ▼0.1% |
| | Fourth party |
| Party | Independent |
| Last election | 1 seats, 3.6% |
| Seats before | 4 |
| Seats won | 1 |
| Seats after | 4 |
| Seat change | Steady |
| Popular vote | 0 |
| Percentage | 0.0% |
| Swing | ▼3.6% |
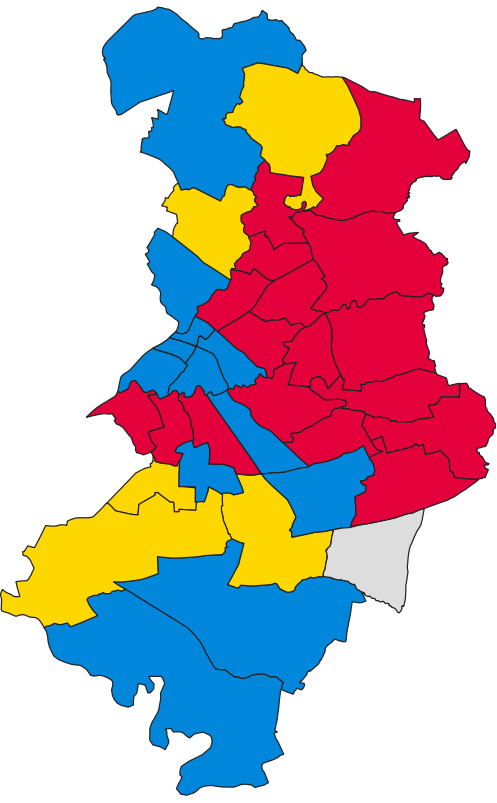
- Map of results of 1926 election
Leader of the Council before election
Conservative
Leader of the Council after election
No overall control

Elections to Manchester City Council were held on Monday, 1 November 1926. One third of the councillors seats were up for election, with each successful candidate to serve a three-year term of office. The Conservative Party lost overall control of the council.

== Election result ==
| Party | Votes | | Seats | | | Full Council | |
| Conservative Party | 49,370 (40.1%) | ▼1.9 | 12 (34.3%) | 12 / 35 | ▼6 | 68 (48.5%) | 68 / 140 |
| Labour Party | 51,942 (42.2%) | ▲6.6 | 17 (48.6%) | 17 / 35 | ▲7 | 41 (29.3%) | 41 / 140 |
| Liberal Party | 20,764 (16.9%) | ▼0.1 | 5 (14.3%) | 5 / 35 | ▼1 | 27 (19.3%) | 28 / 140 |
| Independent | 0 (0.0%) | ▼3.6 | 1 (2.9%) | 1 / 35 | Steady | 4 (2.3%) | 4 / 140 |
| Independent Labour | 698 (0.6%) | N/A | 0 (0.0%) | 0 / 35 | N/A | 0 (0.0%) | 0 / 140 |
| Prohibitionist | 160 (0.1%) | N/A | 0 (0.0%) | 0 / 35 | N/A | 0 (0.0%) | 0 / 140 |
| Residents | 157 (0.1%) | ▼0.1 | 0 (0.0%) | 0 / 35 | Steady | 0 (0.0%) | 0 / 140 |

=== Full council ===
↓
| 41 | 27 | 4 | 68 |

== Ward results ==
=== All Saints' ===
All Saints'
| Party | Candidate | Votes | % | ±% |
|---|---|---|---|---|
| Labour | J. Williams | 1,701 | 56.8 | +6.6 |
| Conservative | J. O'Loughlin* | 1,293 | 43.2 | N/A |
| Majority | | 408 | 13.6 | +13.2 |
| Turnout | | 2,994 | 34.0 | −9.9 |
| Labour gain from Conservative | | Swing | | |

=== Ardwick ===
Ardwick
| Party | Candidate | Votes | % | ±% |
|---|---|---|---|---|
| Labour | J. M. Wharton | 2,935 | 52.6 | −1.2 |
| Conservative | A. E. B. Alexander* | 2,641 | 47.4 | +1.2 |
| Majority | | 294 | 5.2 | −2.4 |
| Turnout | | 5,576 | 53.6 | −7.2 |
| Labour gain from Conservative | | Swing | | |

=== Beswick ===
Beswick
| Party | Candidate | Votes | % | ±% |
|---|---|---|---|---|
| Labour | W. Robinson* | uncontested | | |
| Labour hold | | Swing | | |

=== Blackley ===
Blackley
| Party | Candidate | Votes | % | ±% |
|---|---|---|---|---|
| Liberal | T. S. Williams* | 2,940 | 67.9 | +2.0 |
| Labour | W. Slack | 1,389 | 32.1 | −2.0 |
| Majority | | 1,551 | 35.8 | +4.0 |
| Turnout | | 4,329 | 46.9 | −4.2 |
| Liberal hold | | Swing | | |

=== Bradford ===
Bradford
| Party | Candidate | Votes | % | ±% |
|---|---|---|---|---|
| Labour | E. J. Hart* | 3,277 | 64.2 | +4.3 |
| Conservative | J. G. Kilbourne | 1,829 | 35.8 | −4.3 |
| Majority | | 1,448 | 28.4 | +8.6 |
| Turnout | | 5,106 | 47.4 | −10.8 |
| Labour hold | | Swing | | |

=== Cheetham ===
Cheetham
| Party | Candidate | Votes | % | ±% |
|---|---|---|---|---|
| Liberal | J. J. Kendall* | 2,324 | 62.5 | N/A |
| Labour | L. B. Harrison | 1,394 | 37.5 | +1.8 |
| Majority | | 930 | 25.0 | N/A |
| Turnout | | 3,718 | 39.0 | −16.0 |
| Liberal hold | | Swing | | |

=== Chorlton-cum-Hardy ===
Chorlton-cum-Hardy
| Party | Candidate | Votes | % | ±% |
|---|---|---|---|---|
| Liberal | J. W. Maitland | 3,783 | 51.0 | +4.3 |
| Conservative | W. Somerville | 3,640 | 49.0 | −2.9 |
| Majority | | 143 | 2.0 | |
| Turnout | | 7,423 | 42.6 | −15.7 |
| Liberal gain from Conservative | | Swing | | |

=== Collegiate Church ===
Collegiate Church
| Party | Candidate | Votes | % | ±% |
|---|---|---|---|---|
| Conservative | J. Hill* | 901 | 54.4 | N/A |
| Labour | J. C. Leigh | 755 | 45.6 | N/A |
| Majority | | 146 | 8.8 | N/A |
| Turnout | | 1,656 | 45.5 | N/A |
| Conservative hold | | Swing | | |

=== Collyhurst ===
Collyhurst
| Party | Candidate | Votes | % | ±% |
|---|---|---|---|---|
| Labour | W. Johnston | 3,139 | 55.6 | +5.8 |
| Conservative | E. Shields* | 2,504 | 44.4 | −5.8 |
| Majority | | 635 | 11.2 | |
| Turnout | | 5,643 | 60.1 | −4.0 |
| Labour gain from Conservative | | Swing | | |

=== Crumpsall ===
Crumpsall
| Party | Candidate | Votes | % | ±% |
|---|---|---|---|---|
| Conservative | G. S. Grindley* | uncontested | | |
| Conservative hold | | Swing | | |

=== Didsbury ===
Didsbury
| Party | Candidate | Votes | % | ±% |
|---|---|---|---|---|
| Conservative | G. H. White* | 1,968 | 53.3 | −6.2 |
| Liberal | A. F. Mason | 1,727 | 46.7 | +6.2 |
| Majority | | 241 | 6.6 | −12.4 |
| Turnout | | 3,695 | 57.1 | −6.5 |
| Conservative hold | | Swing | | |

=== Exchange ===
Exchange
| Party | Candidate | Votes | % | ±% |
|---|---|---|---|---|
| Conservative | A. S. Harper* | uncontested | | |
| Conservative hold | | Swing | | |

=== Gorton North ===
Gorton North
| Party | Candidate | Votes | % | ±% |
|---|---|---|---|---|
| Labour | W. Davy* | uncontested | | |
| Labour hold | | Swing | | |

=== Gorton South ===
Gorton South
| Party | Candidate | Votes | % | ±% |
|---|---|---|---|---|
| Labour | T. H. Adams | 3,752 | 61.0 | N/A |
| Conservative | F. Earley | 2,398 | 39.0 | N/A |
| Majority | | 1,354 | 22.0 | N/A |
| Turnout | | 6,150 | 56.8 | N/A |
| Labour hold | | Swing | | |

=== Harpurhey ===
Harpurhey
| Party | Candidate | Votes | % | ±% |
|---|---|---|---|---|
| Labour | J. Howard | 2,811 | 51.2 | +0.8 |
| Conservative | E. Eady | 2,675 | 48.8 | −0.8 |
| Majority | | 136 | 2.4 | +1.6 |
| Turnout | | 5,486 | 55.2 | −5.8 |
| Labour gain from Conservative | | Swing | | |

=== Levenshulme ===
Levenshulme
| Party | Candidate | Votes | % | ±% |
|---|---|---|---|---|
| Independent | J. Harrison* | uncontested | | |
| Independent hold | | Swing | | |

=== Longsight ===
Longsight
| Party | Candidate | Votes | % | ±% |
|---|---|---|---|---|
| Conservative | W. P. Jackson* | 3,475 | 58.6 | −9.0 |
| Labour | T. F. Banville | 2,451 | 41.4 | N/A |
| Majority | | 1,024 | 17.2 | +23.0 |
| Turnout | | 5,926 | 56.8 | +2.4 |
| Conservative hold | | Swing | | |

=== Medlock Street ===
Medlock Street
| Party | Candidate | Votes | % | ±% |
|---|---|---|---|---|
| Labour | E. Chorlton | 2,833 | 54.5 | +12.5 |
| Conservative | W. J. Pine* | 1,792 | 34.5 | −23.5 |
| Liberal | J. A. Wood | 550 | 10.6 | N/A |
| Residents | J. Gillan | 20 | 0.4 | N/A |
| Majority | | 1,041 | 20.0 | |
| Turnout | | 5,195 | 43.1 | −1.6 |
| Labour gain from Conservative | | Swing | | |

=== Miles Platting ===
Miles Platting
| Party | Candidate | Votes | % | ±% |
|---|---|---|---|---|
| Labour | A. James* | 4,148 | 61.0 | +7.6 |
| Conservative | A. Shepherd | 2,653 | 39.0 | −7.6 |
| Majority | | 1,495 | 22.0 | +15.2 |
| Turnout | | 6,801 | 65.6 | −6.4 |
| Labour hold | | Swing | | |

=== Moss Side East ===
Moss Side East
| Party | Candidate | Votes | % | ±% |
|---|---|---|---|---|
| Conservative | S. B. Watts | 1,551 | 46.7 | −1.8 |
| Liberal | H. Entwistle | 1,521 | 45.8 | N/A |
| Prohibitionist | J. Rochford | 160 | 4.8 | N/A |
| Residents | A. R. Edwards | 86 | 2.6 | +0.5 |
| Majority | | 30 | 0.9 | |
| Turnout | | 3,318 | 40.8 | −10.1 |
| Conservative gain from Liberal | | Swing | | |

=== Moss Side West ===
Moss Side West
| Party | Candidate | Votes | % | ±% |
|---|---|---|---|---|
| Liberal | J. Mathewson Watson* | 3,372 | 79.4 | N/A |
| Labour | W. J. Munro | 876 | 20.6 | N/A |
| Majority | | 2,496 | 58.8 | |
| Turnout | | 4,248 | 48.1 | −1.8 |
| Liberal hold | | Swing | | |

=== Moston ===
Moston
| Party | Candidate | Votes | % | ±% |
|---|---|---|---|---|
| Labour | M. Welch* | 2,795 | 51.7 | −6.9 |
| Conservative | F. Farrington | 2,609 | 48.3 | N/A |
| Majority | | 186 | 3.4 | −13.8 |
| Turnout | | 5,404 | 61.0 | +2.6 |
| Labour hold | | Swing | | |

=== New Cross ===
New Cross
| Party | Candidate | Votes | % | ±% |
|---|---|---|---|---|
| Labour | W. Hallows | 3,500 | 52.0 | 0 |
| Conservative | J. C. Grime* | 3,182 | 47.3 | −0.7 |
| Residents | J. A. P. Holmes | 51 | 0.8 | N/A |
| Majority | | 318 | 4.7 | +0.7 |
| Turnout | | 6,733 | 66.9 | +4.8 |
| Labour gain from Conservative | | Swing | | |

=== Newton Heath ===
Newton Heath
| Party | Candidate | Votes | % | ±% |
|---|---|---|---|---|
| Labour | H. M. Mitchell* | 3,061 | 57.0 | +7.3 |
| Conservative | J. Fildes | 2,309 | 43.0 | −7.3 |
| Majority | | 752 | 14.0 | |
| Turnout | | 5,370 | 60.4 | −2.3 |
| Labour hold | | Swing | | |

=== Openshaw ===
Openshaw
| Party | Candidate | Votes | % | ±% |
|---|---|---|---|---|
| Labour | G. F. Titt* | uncontested | | |
| Labour hold | | Swing | | |

=== Oxford ===
Oxford
| Party | Candidate | Votes | % | ±% |
|---|---|---|---|---|
| Conservative | R. W. Shepherd* | 636 | 61.9 | N/A |
| Liberal | A. Todd | 391 | 38.1 | N/A |
| Majority | | 245 | 23.8 | N/A |
| Turnout | | 1,027 | 37.4 | N/A |
| Conservative hold | | Swing | | |

=== Rusholme ===
Rusholme
| Party | Candidate | Votes | % | ±% |
|---|---|---|---|---|
| Liberal | C. H. Barlow* | uncontested | | |
| Liberal hold | | Swing | | |

=== St. Ann's ===
St. Ann's
| Party | Candidate | Votes | % | ±% |
|---|---|---|---|---|
| Conservative | R. A. Larmuth* | uncontested | | |
| Conservative hold | | Swing | | |

=== St. Clement's ===
St. Clement's
| Party | Candidate | Votes | % | ±% |
|---|---|---|---|---|
| Conservative | J. Goodwin* | 819 | 39.7 | −10.9 |
| Labour | J. Cassey | 753 | 36.5 | N/A |
| Liberal | C. N. Glidewell | 489 | 23.7 | −25.7 |
| Majority | | 66 | 3.2 | +2.0 |
| Turnout | | 2,061 | 66.4 | +2.1 |
| Conservative hold | | Swing | | |

=== St. George's ===
St. George's
| Party | Candidate | Votes | % | ±% |
|---|---|---|---|---|
| Labour | J. G. Clapham | 3,137 | 58.0 | +8.8 |
| Conservative | C. A. Toyn* | 2,276 | 42.0 | N/A |
| Majority | | 861 | 16.0 | |
| Turnout | | 5,413 | 45.7 | +3.5 |
| Labour gain from Conservative | | Swing | | |

=== St. John's ===
St. John's
| Party | Candidate | Votes | % | ±% |
|---|---|---|---|---|
| Conservative | I. Hinchliffe* | 1,136 | 75.4 | N/A |
| Labour | F. Edwards | 371 | 24.6 | N/A |
| Majority | | 765 | 50.8 | N/A |
| Turnout | | 1,507 | 58.4 | N/A |
| Conservative hold | | Swing | | |

=== St. Luke's ===
St. Luke's
| Party | Candidate | Votes | % | ±% |
|---|---|---|---|---|
| Conservative | J. W. Higginbottom* | 1,989 | 54.4 | +9.6 |
| Liberal | W. T. O'Gorman | 1,670 | 45.6 | −9.6 |
| Majority | | 319 | 8.8 | |
| Turnout | | 3,659 | 35.1 | −18.5 |
| Conservative hold | | Swing | | |

=== St. Mark's ===
St. Mark's
| Party | Candidate | Votes | % | ±% |
|---|---|---|---|---|
| Labour | C. Wood* | 3,700 | 72.0 | +4.2 |
| Conservative | J. F. Bennison | 1,441 | 28.0 | −4.2 |
| Majority | | 2,259 | 44.0 | +8.4 |
| Turnout | | 5,141 | 50.0 | −8.3 |
| Labour hold | | Swing | | |

=== St. Michael's ===
St. Michael's
| Party | Candidate | Votes | % | ±% |
|---|---|---|---|---|
| Labour | J. Reilly* | 2,456 | 54.3 | +15.3 |
| Conservative | W. A. Parker | 1,371 | 30.3 | −9.2 |
| Independent Labour | J. Shaw | 698 | 15.4 | N/A |
| Majority | | 1,085 | 24.0 | |
| Turnout | | 4,525 | 67.4 | −0.9 |
| Labour hold | | Swing | | |

=== Withington ===
Withington
| Party | Candidate | Votes | % | ±% |
|---|---|---|---|---|
| Conservative | J. S. Hill | 2,282 | 45.8 | −3.9 |
| Liberal | W. A. Lewins* | 1,997 | 40.0 | N/A |
| Labour | P. J. Wall | 708 | 14.2 | −3.8 |
| Majority | | 235 | 5.8 | +4.0 |
| Turnout | | 4,327 | 62.2 | −1.0 |
| Conservative gain from Liberal | | Swing | | |

== Aldermanic elections ==
=== Aldermanic election, 2 February 1927 ===
Caused by the death on 26 January 1927 of Alderman T. C. Abbott (Liberal, elected as an alderman by the council on 20 May 1914).

In his place, Councillor Edwin Pierce (Conservative, All Saints', elected 1 November 1908) was elected as an alderman by the council on 2 February 1927.

| Party | Alderman | Ward | Term expires |
|---|---|---|---|
| Conservative | Edwin Pierce | St. Ann's | 1928 |

=== Aldermanic election, 4 May 1927 ===
Caused by the death on 20 April 1927 of Alderman J. R. Smith (Conservative, elected as an alderman by the council on 2 April 1913).

In his place, Councillor Joseph Swarbrick (Liberal, Didsbury, elected 1 November 1908) was elected as an alderman by the council on 4 May 1927.

| Party | Alderman | Ward | Term expires |
|---|---|---|---|
| Liberal | Joseph Swarbrick | Collegiate Church | 1928 |

=== Aldermanic elections, 24 June 1927 ===
Caused by the death on 30 May 1927 of Alderman John Turner (Conservative, elected as an alderman by the council on 4 February 1920).

In his place, Councillor John James Kendall (Liberal, Cheetham, elected 27 November 1908) was elected as an alderman by the council on 24 June 1927.

| Party | Alderman | Ward | Term expires |
|---|---|---|---|
| Liberal | John James Kendall | Chorlton-cum-Hardy | 1931 |

Caused by the death on 10 June 1927 of Alderman Edwin Pierce (Conservative, elected as an alderman by the council on 2 February 1927).

In his place, Councillor Miles Mitchell (Liberal, Levenshulme, elected 1 November 1909) was elected as an alderman by the council on 24 June 1927.

| Party | Alderman | Ward | Term expires |
|---|---|---|---|
| Liberal | Miles Mitchell | St. Ann's | 1928 |

== By-elections between 1926 and 1927 ==
=== All Saints', 15 February 1927 ===
Caused by the election as an alderman of Councillor Edwin Pierce (Conservative, All Saints', elected 1 November 1908) on 2 February 1927, following the death on 26 January 1927 of Alderman T. C. Abbott (Liberal, elected as an alderman by the council on 20 May 1914).

All Saints'
| Party | Candidate | Votes | % | ±% |
|---|---|---|---|---|
| Conservative | W. Davies | 1,238 | 37.3 | −5.9 |
| Labour | F. E. Walker | 1,067 | 32.1 | −24.7 |
| Liberal | B. McManus | 995 | 30.0 | N/A |
| Residents | A. R. Edwards | 20 | 0.6 | N/A |
| Majority | | 171 | 5.2 | |
| Turnout | | 3,320 | 37.7 | +3.7 |
| Conservative hold | | Swing | | |

=== Didsbury, 17 May 1927 ===
Caused by the election as an alderman of Councillor Joseph Swarbrick (Liberal, Didsbury, elected 1 November 1908) on 4 May 1927, following the death on 20 April 1927 of Alderman J. R. Smith (Conservative, elected as an alderman by the council on 2 April 1913).

Didsbury
| Party | Candidate | Votes | % | ±% |
|---|---|---|---|---|
| Conservative | J. E. Heald | 1,755 | 55.0 | +1.7 |
| Liberal | T. Molloy | 1,079 | 33.8 | −12.9 |
| Labour | A. McIlwrick | 355 | 11.1 | N/A |
| Majority | | 676 | 21.2 | +14.6 |
| Turnout | | 3,189 | 48.6 | −8.5 |
| Conservative gain from Liberal | | Swing | | |

=== By-elections, 7 July 1927 ===
Two by-elections were held on 7 July 1927 to fill vacancies that were created by the appointment of aldermen on 24 June 1927.

==== Cheetham ====
Caused by the election as an alderman of Councillor John James Kendall (Liberal, Cheetham, elected 27 November 1908) on 24 June 1927, following the death on 30 May 1927 of Alderman John Turner (Conservative, elected as an alderman by the council on 4 February 1920).

Cheetham
| Party | Candidate | Votes | % | ±% |
|---|---|---|---|---|
| Conservative | J. C. Grime | 2,268 | 47.7 | N/A |
| Liberal | H. A. Nathan | 1,480 | 31.1 | −31.4 |
| Labour | L. B. Harrison | 1,006 | 21.2 | −16.3 |
| Majority | | 788 | 16.6 | |
| Turnout | | 4,754 | 55.8 | +16.8 |
| Conservative gain from Liberal | | Swing | | |

==== Levenshulme ====
Caused by the election as an alderman of Councillor Miles Mitchell (Liberal, Levenshulme, elected 1 November 1909) on 24 June 1927, following the death on 10 June 1927 of Alderman Edwin Pierce (Conservative, elected as an alderman by the council on 2 February 1927).

Levenshulme
| Party | Candidate | Votes | % | ±% |
|---|---|---|---|---|
| Liberal | C. R. de la Wyche | 2,597 | 81.6 | N/A |
| Labour | A. Woolley | 585 | 18.4 | N/A |
| Majority | | 2,012 | 63.2 | N/A |
| Turnout | | 3,182 | | |
| Liberal hold | | Swing | | |
