= Godfrey Lias =

Arthur Godfrey Lias OBE (19 May 1887 – 3 February 1964) was a British journalist and author, primarily of historical works, as well as a teacher and military officer.

== Early life ==
Lias was born in Cambridge, the son of clergyman John James Lias and his first wife, Edith Susan Attenborough. His father was Chancellor of Llandaff Cathedral in Wales, and Hulsean Lecturer in Divinity and Lady Margaret Preacher at the University of Cambridge. His mother died a week after his birth and his father remarried in 1890.

== Career ==
During the first World War, Lias was Captain and Adjutant, 11th Battalion Duke of Wellington's Regiment and Instructor at the Royal Military College, Sandhurst. At the outbreak of the Second World War, he joined the Foreign Office News Department. Later, he was British representative on the Inter-Allied Information Committee, the official publicity organ of the Ministries of Information of the Allied Governments in London. In 1944, he joined the Political Intelligence Department of the Foreign Office as Director of the Czechoslovak Region.

At one time, Godfrey Lias was an Assistant Master at Victoria College, Alexandria, Egypt, and then Head-master at the Muhammadan Anglo-Oriental College (now Aligarh Muslim University) in Aligarh, Uttar Pradesh, India.

He took the History Tripos at King's College, Cambridge, and in the period between WWI and WWII (i.e.: circa 1918–1939) was diplomatic correspondent of the Christian Science Monitor, for which time he was awarded an OBE for political and public services.

He was Correspondent of The Times, The Economist and Christian Science Monitor in Prague, from August 1945 until he was expelled by the communists in July 1949, then in Vienna until June 1953, when he returned to England.

== Personal life ==
Lias was twice married and had two daughters from his first marriage. During Lias's time at the Foreign Office, his daughter Angela married archeologist Ronald F. Tylecote. He died in London, aged 76.

== Published works ==
- Beneš of Czechoslovakia, G. Allen & Unwin, 1940
- I Survived, Evans Bros., 1954
- Glubb's Legion, Evans Bros., 1956
- Kazak Exodus, Evans Bros., 1956 (Translated into Turkish as: Büyük Kazak Göçü)
- Olaf, MacGibbon & Kee, 1958
- Doctor in revolt, by Dr. Geza as told to Godfrey Lias, London, F. Muller 1958
- Adventurer extraordinary; the Tiger Sarll story. With a foreword by Eamonn Andrews, London, Cassell, 1961
- With Garibaldi in Italy, F. Muller, 1963
- Kazak Exodus, Evans Bros., 1956. Author information on jacket cover.
