= 1936 Manchester City Council election =

Local election in Manchester

- 2 November 1936

36 of 144 seats on Manchester City Council 73 seats needed for a majority
	First party	Second party	Third party
Party	Conservative	Labour	Liberal
Last election	13 seats, 46.1%	16 seats, 39.5%	7 seats, 13.6%
Seats before	62	53	26
Seats won	18	14	3
Seats after	63	53	25
Seat change	▲1	Steady	▼1
Popular vote	53,666	47,977	7,749
Percentage	47.9%	42.8%	6.9%
Swing	▲1.8%	▲3.3%	▼6.7%
	Fourth party	Fifth party
Party	Independent Labour	Independent
Last election	0 seats, 0.0%	0 seats, 0.4%
Seats before	2	1
Seats won	0	1
Seats after	2	1
Seat change	Steady	Steady
Popular vote	0	1,504
Percentage	0.0%	1.3%
Swing	Steady	▲0.9%
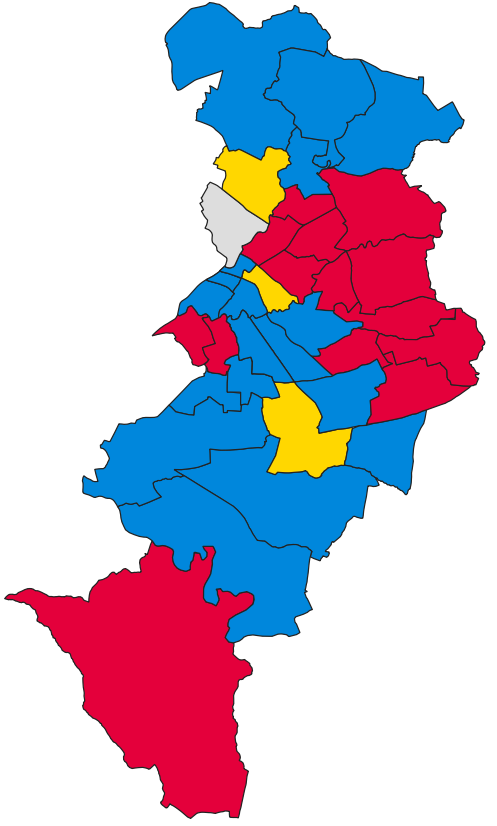
- Map of results of 1936 election
Leader of the Council before election
No overall control
Leader of the Council after election
No overall control

Elections to Manchester City Council were held on Monday, 2 November 1936. One third of the councillors seats were up for election, with each successful candidate to serve a three-year term of office. The council remained under no overall control.

== Election result ==
Party	Votes		Seats			Full Council	
Conservative Party	53,666 (47.9%)	▲1.8	18 (50.0%)	18 / 36	▲1	63 (43.8%)	63 / 144
Labour Party	47,977 (42.8%)	▲3.3	14 (38.9%)	14 / 36	Steady	53 (36.8%)	53 / 144
Liberal Party	7,749 (6.9%)	▼6.7	3 (8.3%)	3 / 36	▼1	25 (17.4%)	25 / 144
Independent Labour	0 (0.0%)	Steady	0 (0.0%)	0 / 36	Steady	2 (1.4%)	2 / 144
Independent	1,504 (1.3%)	▲0.9	1 (2.8%)	1 / 36	Steady	1 (0.7%)	1 / 144
Residents	1,146 (1.0%)	▲0.5	0 (0.0%)	0 / 36	Steady	0 (0.0%)	0 / 144

=== Full council ===
↓
2	53	25	1	63

=== Aldermen ===
↓
9	9	18

=== Councillors ===
↓
2	44	16	1	45

== Ward results ==
=== All Saints' ===
All Saints'
Party	Candidate	Votes	%	±%
Conservative	J. Procter-Pearson	1,608	56.0	+0.3
Labour	D. Hunter	1,263	44.0	−0.3
Majority		345	12.0	+0.6
Turnout		2,871		
Conservative gain from Labour		Swing		

=== Ardwick ===
Ardwick
Party	Candidate	Votes	%	±%
Conservative	M. L. K. Jones*	3,334	62.6	+18.8
Labour	F. Helme	1,994	37.4	−18.8
Majority		1,340	25.2	
Turnout		5,328		
Conservative hold		Swing		

=== Beswick ===
Beswick
Party	Candidate	Votes	%	±%
Labour	L. B. Cox*	uncontested		
Labour hold		Swing		

=== Blackley ===
Blackley
Party	Candidate	Votes	%	±%
Conservative	B. S. Vivante	2,340	54.2	+3.8
Labour	W. Footit	1,977	45.8	+14.1
Majority		363	8.4	−10.3
Turnout		4,317		
Conservative hold		Swing		

=== Bradford ===
Bradford
Party	Candidate	Votes	%	±%
Labour	R. Malcolm*	3,134	67.3	+4.6
Conservative	C. E. Holdnall	1,522	32.7	−4.6
Majority		1,612	34.6	+9.2
Turnout		4,656		
Labour hold		Swing		

=== Cheetham ===
Cheetham
Party	Candidate	Votes	%	±%
Liberal	S. Laski*	2,328	72.7	+25.0
Labour	F. Regan	873	27.3	N/A
Majority		1,455	45.4	
Turnout		3,201		
Liberal hold		Swing		

=== Chorlton-cum-Hardy ===
Chorlton-cum-Hardy
Party	Candidate	Votes	%	±%
Conservative	J. Watts*	6,062	79.3	+30.1
Labour	A. Plummer	1,580	20.7	+2.5
Majority		4,482	58.6	+42.0
Turnout		7,642		
Conservative hold		Swing		

=== Collegiate Church ===
Collegiate Church
Party	Candidate	Votes	%	±%
Independent	D. Gouldman*	1,310	75.4	N/A
Labour	H. Goldstone	427	24.6	N/A
Majority		883	50.8	N/A
Turnout		1,737		
Independent hold		Swing		

=== Collyhurst ===
Collyhurst
Party	Candidate	Votes	%	±%
Labour	I. Floyd*	2,033	62.7	N/A
Conservative	J. R. Spence	1,208	37.3	N/A
Majority		825	25.4	N/A
Turnout		3,241		
Labour hold		Swing		

=== Crumpsall ===
Crumpsall
Party	Candidate	Votes	%	±%
Conservative	G. S. Grindley*	2,398	63.0	+29.5
Labour	C. W. Carpenter	1,216	31.9	+14.4
Independent	W. Dennison	194	5.1	N/A
Majority		1,182	31.1	
Turnout		3,808		
Conservative hold		Swing		

=== Didsbury ===
Didsbury
Party	Candidate	Votes	%	±%
Conservative	E. Hill	3,590	67.6	−4.4
Labour	W. Ingham	1,722	32.4	+4.4
Majority		1,868	35.2	−8.8
Turnout		5,312		
Conservative hold		Swing		

=== Exchange ===
Exchange
Party	Candidate	Votes	%	±%
Conservative	C. F. Terry*	uncontested		
Conservative hold		Swing		

=== Gorton North ===
Gorton North
Party	Candidate	Votes	%	±%
Labour	T. Walker*	uncontested		
Labour hold		Swing		

=== Gorton South ===
Gorton South
Party	Candidate	Votes	%	±%
Labour	G. R. Leslie*	3,147	62.4	N/A
Conservative	E. Shaw	1,895	37.6	N/A
Majority		1,252	24.8	N/A
Turnout		5,042		
Labour hold		Swing		

=== Harpurhey ===
Harpurhey
Party	Candidate	Votes	%	±%
Conservative	C. F. Howarth*	2,692	56.6	+8.8
Labour	E. Barnacott	2,061	43.4	−8.8
Majority		631	13.2	
Turnout		4,753		
Conservative hold		Swing		

=== Levenshulme ===
Levenshulme
Party	Candidate	Votes	%	±%
Conservative	S. R. Fairfoull*	2,832	66.0	N/A
Labour	M. Knight	1,456	34.0	N/A
Majority		1,376	32.0	N/A
Turnout		4,288		
Conservative hold		Swing		

=== Longsight ===
Longsight
Party	Candidate	Votes	%	±%
Conservative	J. H. Meachin*	2,990	68.5	+2.4
Labour	C. W. Jones	1,372	31.5	−2.4
Majority		1,618	37.0	+4.8
Turnout		4,362		
Conservative hold		Swing		

=== Medlock Street ===
Medlock Street
Party	Candidate	Votes	%	±%
Labour	E. L. Jones*	2,350	66.3	+16.1
Conservative	C. E. Goolden	1,197	33.7	−16.1
Majority		1,153	32.6	+32.2
Turnout		3,547		
Labour hold		Swing		

=== Miles Platting ===
Miles Platting
Party	Candidate	Votes	%	±%
Labour	F. C. Mason*	uncontested		
Labour hold		Swing		

=== Moss Side East ===
Moss Side East
Party	Candidate	Votes	%	±%
Conservative	H. A. E. Ramsden*	1,265	40.0	−9.9
Labour	W. Griffiths	986	31.2	−2.7
Residents	A. R. Edwards	914	28.8	+12.6
Majority		279	8.8	−7.2
Turnout		3,165		
Conservative hold		Swing		

=== Moss Side West ===
Moss Side West
Party	Candidate	Votes	%	±%
Conservative	D. Gosling*	1,991	62.7	N/A
Labour	T. Knowles	954	30.0	−5.4
Residents	A. M. Edwards	232	7.3	N/A
Majority		1,037	32.7	
Turnout		3,177		
Conservative hold		Swing		

=== Moston ===
Moston
Party	Candidate	Votes	%	±%
Conservative	F. Farrington*	3,754	52.2	+5.0
Labour	S. D. Simon	3,433	47.8	−5.0
Majority		321	4.4	
Turnout		7,187		
Conservative hold		Swing		

=== New Cross ===
New Cross
Party	Candidate	Votes	%	±%
Labour	L. M. Lever*	3,286	70.2	N/A
Conservative	F. Blumberg	1,392	29.8	N/A
Majority		1,894	40.4	N/A
Turnout		4,678		
Labour hold		Swing		

=== Newton Heath ===
Newton Heath
Party	Candidate	Votes	%	±%
Labour	J. Young*	uncontested		
Labour hold		Swing		

=== Openshaw ===
Openshaw
Party	Candidate	Votes	%	±%
Labour	R. Moss*	uncontested		
Labour hold		Swing		

=== Oxford ===
Oxford
Party	Candidate	Votes	%	±%
Conservative	W. R. Sutton*	uncontested		
Conservative hold		Swing		

=== Rusholme ===
Rusholme
Party	Candidate	Votes	%	±%
Liberal	R. G. Edwards*	2,383	73.5	+3.0
Labour	W. E. Harrison	859	26.5	−3.0
Majority		1,524	47.0	+6.0
Turnout		3,242		
Liberal hold		Swing		

=== St. Ann's ===
St. Ann's
Party	Candidate	Votes	%	±%
Conservative	W. Challoner*	uncontested		
Conservative hold		Swing		

=== St. Clement's ===
St. Clement's
Party	Candidate	Votes	%	±%
Liberal	B. McManus*	uncontested		
Liberal hold		Swing		

=== St. George's ===
St. George's
Party	Candidate	Votes	%	±%
Labour	C. Beamand*	2,031	52.9	+0.9
Conservative	R. B. Breeze	1,808	47.1	−0.9
Majority		223	5.8	+1.8
Turnout		3,839		
Labour hold		Swing		

=== St. John's ===
St. John's
Party	Candidate	Votes	%	±%
Conservative	J. E. Burgess*	uncontested		
Conservative hold		Swing		

=== St. Luke's ===
St. Luke's
Party	Candidate	Votes	%	±%
Conservative	T. Harrison*	2,094	53.7	N/A
Labour	W. Taylor	1,805	46.3	−1.5
Majority		289	7.4	
Turnout		3,899		
Conservative hold		Swing		

=== St. Mark's ===
St. Mark's
Party	Candidate	Votes	%	±%
Labour	T. M. Larrad*	2,421	63.3	N/A
Conservative	S. Bloor	1,403	36.7	N/A
Majority		1,018	26.6	N/A
Turnout		3,824		
Labour hold		Swing		

=== St. Michael's ===
St. Michael's
Party	Candidate	Votes	%	±%
Labour	T. Cassidy*	uncontested		
Labour hold		Swing		

=== Withington ===
Withington
Party	Candidate	Votes	%	±%
Conservative	R. S. Woffenden	3,922	40.6	−22.4
Liberal	A. P. Simon*	3,038	31.5	N/A
Labour	F. Edwards	2,698	27.9	−9.1
Majority		884	9.1	−16.9
Turnout		9,658		
Conservative gain from Liberal		Swing		

=== Wythenshawe ===
Wythenshawe
Party	Candidate	Votes	%	±%
Labour	J. Cooper	2,899	55.0	+14.5
Conservative	S. Lowe*	2,369	45.0	−14.5
Majority		530	10.0	
Turnout		5,268		
Labour gain from Conservative		Swing		

== Aldermanic elections ==
=== Aldermanic election, 9 November 1936 ===
Caused by the death on 23 October 1936 of Alderman Robert Turner (Conservative, elected as an alderman by the council on 2 March 1921).

In his place, Councillor George Hall (Independent Labour, St. Mark's, elected 1 November 1919) was elected as an alderman by the council on 9 November 1936.

Party	Alderman	Ward	Term expires
Independent Labour	George Hall	St. Mark's	1940

=== Aldermanic election, 6 January 1937 ===
Caused by the death on 20 December 1936 of Alderman Tom Cook (Conservative, elected as an alderman by the council on 8 January 1919).

In his place, Councillor George Sutton Grindley (Conservative, Crumpsall, elected 1 November 1930, previously 1920-29) was elected as an alderman by the council on 6 January 1937.

Party	Alderman	Ward	Term expires
Conservative	George Sutton Grindley	Openshaw	1937

=== Aldermanic elections, 6 October 1937 ===
Caused by the death on 30 August 1937 of Alderman James Henry Swales (Conservative, elected as an alderman by the council on 7 February 1923).

In his place, Councillor Harold White (Conservative, Didsbury, elected 1 November 1920) was elected as an alderman by the council on 6 October 1937.

Party	Alderman	Ward	Term expires
Conservative	Harold White	Moss Side West	1940

Caused by the resignation on 23 September 1937 of Alderman Will Melland (Liberal, elected as an alderman by the council on 2 October 1929).

In his place, Councillor Charles Henry Barlow (Liberal, Rusholme, elected 1 November 1920) was elected as an alderman by the council on 6 October 1937.

Party	Alderman	Ward	Term expires
Liberal	Charles Henry Barlow	Beswick	1940

== By-elections between 1936 and 1937 ==
=== All Saints', 19 November 1936 ===
Caused by the death of Councillor Henry Fryers (Labour, All Saints', elected 1 November 1934) on 11 October 1936.

All Saints'
Party	Candidate	Votes	%	±%
Conservative	L. W. Biggs	1,519	58.6	+2.6
Labour	D. Hunter	1,074	41.4	−2.6
Majority		445	17.2	+5.2
Turnout		2,593		
Conservative gain from Labour		Swing		

=== St. Mark's, 26 November 1936 ===
Caused by the election as an alderman of Councillor George Hall (Independent Labour, St. Mark's, elected 1 November 1919) on 9 November 1936, following the death on 23 October 1936 of Alderman Robert Turner (Conservative, elected as an alderman by the council on 2 March 1921).

St. Mark's
Party	Candidate	Votes	%	±%
Labour	J. W. Ellershaw	2,006	53.0	−10.3
Conservative	G. Boden	1,782	47.0	+10.3
Majority		224	6.0	−20.6
Turnout		3,788		
Labour gain from Independent Labour		Swing		

=== Beswick, 21 January 1937 ===
Caused by the death of Councillor Mary Bell (Labour, Beswick, elected 30 April 1936) on 8 December 1936.

Beswick
Party	Candidate	Votes	%	±%
Labour	H. Baldwin*	uncontested		
Labour hold		Swing		

=== Crumpsall, 28 January 1937 ===
Caused by the election as an alderman of Councillor George Sutton Grindley (Conservative, Crumpsall, elected 1 November 1930, previously 1920-29) on 6 January 1937, following the death on 20 December 1936 of Alderman Tom Cook (Conservative, elected as an alderman by the council on 8 January 1919).

Crumpsall
Party	Candidate	Votes	%	±%
Conservative	C. Roberts	1,168	47.2	−15.8
Liberal	B. G. Bottomley	889	35.9	N/A
Labour	J. Pevie	416	16.8	−15.1
Majority		279	11.3	−19.8
Turnout		2,473		
Conservative hold		Swing		

=== St. Ann's, 22 July 1937 ===
Caused by the resignation of Councillor William Challoner (Conservative, St. Ann's, elected 1 November 1930, previously 1925-28) on 30 June 1937.

St. Ann's
Party	Candidate	Votes	%	±%
Conservative	W. J. Pegge	uncontested		
Conservative hold		Swing		

=== By-elections, 21 October 1937 ===
Two by-elections were held on 21 October 1937 to fill vacancies that were created by the appointment of aldermen on 6 October 1937.

==== Didsbury ====
Caused by the election as an alderman of Councillor Harold White (Conservative, Didsbury, elected 1 November 1920) on 6 October 1937, following the death on 30 August 1937 of Alderman James Henry Swales (Conservative, elected as an alderman by the council on 7 February 1923).

Didsbury
Party	Candidate	Votes	%	±%
Conservative	W. White	2,687	54.0	−13.6
Liberal	C. Timpson	1,537	30.9	N/A
Labour	P. H. Keeley	751	15.1	−17.3
Majority		1,150	23.1	−12.1
Turnout		4,975		
Conservative hold		Swing		

==== Rusholme ====
Caused by the election as an alderman of Councillor Charles Henry Barlow (Liberal, Rusholme, elected 1 November 1920) on 6 October 1937, following the resignation on 23 September 1937 of Alderman Will Melland (Liberal, elected as an alderman by the council on 2 October 1929).

Rusholme
Party	Candidate	Votes	%	±%
Conservative	A. T. Barratt	1,867	48.5	N/A
Liberal	H. Brooks	1,154	30.0	−43.5
Labour	W. E. Harrison	827	21.5	−5.0
Majority		713	18.5	
Turnout		3,848		
Conservative gain from Liberal		Swing		
