= Andrew Tylecote =

British economist

Andrew Tylecote (born 3 January 1946) is a British economist based at The University of Sheffield School of Management. He is best known for his work on the economics of technological change, and for his contributions to long wave economic theory.

Andrew Tylecote was raised in Newcastle upon Tyne, where he was a Scholar of the Royal Grammar School. Before university he taught for a year at the Modern School, New Delhi, India, and was then a Major Scholar of Wadham College, Oxford University where he gained First Class Honours in Philosophy, Politics and Economics in 1968. He gained an MA in Industrial Economics at the University of Sussex, and returned to Oxford for a BPhil in Economics. He gained a doctorate for his book on The Causes of the Present Inflation (1981).

In 1992 he published The Long Wave in the World Economy: The Present Crisis in Historical Perspective, and in 1994 Tylecote became Professor of the Economics and Management of Technological Change. His most recent book was Corporate Governance, Finance and the Technological Advantage of Nations (2008), published with Francesca Visintin and which won the Myrdal Prize in 2010. He is a visiting professor at the Center for Research on Technological Innovation at Tsinghua University, Beijing.

He is the son of the archaeologist and metallurgist Ronald F. Tylecote.
