= Mabel Tylecote =

British Labour Party politician, activist, humanitarian and educationist

- Dame Mabel Tylecote in 1966
- Born: 4 February 1896; Crumpsall
- Died: 31 January 1987 (aged 90); Whalley Range
- Education: Victoria University of Manchester
- Employer: Victoria University of Manchester (1926–1930)
- Political party: Labour Party
- Spouse(s): Frank Edward Tylecote
- Awards: Dame Commander of the Order of the British Empire (1966); honorary doctor of the University of Manchester (1978)

Dame Mabel Tylecote DBE (née Phythian; 4 February 1896 – 31 January 1987) was a British Labour Party politician, activist, humanitarian, and educationist from Manchester, England.

== Biography ==
Born on 4 February 1896 to John Ernest Phythian and Ada Crompton Prichard in Crumpsall, Manchester, Mabel Phythian's father was a solicitor and Liberal member of Manchester City Council from 1892 to 1898. He was also an enthusiastic Ruskinian and one of the founders of the Manchester Ruskin Society in 1879. In 1915, she attended the Victoria University of Manchester. and she graduated in 1919 with an Upper Second in History. She was close to Professor Thomas Frederick Tout, whose daughter Margaret was a History student in her cohort, and to Professor George Unwin, who supervised her BA thesis and advised on her further studies. She visited Unwin at his home the day before his premature death in January 1925 (Diary 1924-5, Tylecote MSS).

After her studies, she taught history for a year in Wisconsin (1919-1920) then in England, at Huddersfield Technical College (1920-1924). She returned to Manchester, as a doctoral student and history assistant from 1926 to 1930, in the History department created in 1922, the Manchester School of History. In 1930, she defended a doctoral thesis on adult education, which she published in 1957 under the title The Mechanics' Institutes of Lancashire and Yorkshire before 1851. She published in 1940 The Education of Women at Manchester University 1883 to 1933 . She left university in 1930 and was, from 1930 to 1932, a warden of the Elvington Settlement, a settlement provided for miners fields.

In 1932, she married Frank Edward Tylecote, physician and professor of medicine at Manchester University from 1929 to 1940. F.E. Tylecote was an early researcher into the link between smoking and lung cancer, and served also as a City Councillor. This was Frank's second marriage, following the death of his first wife; Mabel became stepmother to his son and daughter, and the couple later had a son also. The family lived at Stockport.

She was on the (Manchester) Committee of the Free German League of Culture in Great Britain, founded by published by German and Austrian refugee organisations and supportive British groups, including Albert Einstein, the artist Oskar Kokoschka, writer Thomas Mann and actress Sybil Thorndike. The League had its own publishing company, Inside Nazi Germany, and a major artist, John Heartfield, producing most of its illustrative material.

Tylecote served as a Manchester City Councilor (1940-1951) and Stockport City Councilor (1956-1963), and stood as a Labour Parliamentary candidate at five parliamentary elections from 1938 to 1955, in Fylde, Middleton and Prestwich, and Norwich South.

She remained very attached to Victoria University, but actively supported the new Manchester Polytechnic (founded 1970), where she was a member of the council. The Polytechnic awarded her a life fellowship in 1973, and its successor, Manchester Metropolitan University, named one of its buildings in her memory. It was demolished and replaced by Grosvenor East building in 2020.

Tylecote was made a DBE in 1966. She received an honorific degree from Victoria University of Manchester in 1978.

Her husband died in 1965. Tylecote moved back to Manchester later in life. She died at her home, in Whalley Range, on 31 January 1987.

== Mabel Tylecote Building ==
The Mabel Tylecote Building was a Manchester Metropolitan University building on the University's All Saints Campus. It housed teaching and learning space for the Department of Languages and the MMU School of Theatre as well as academic and administrative staff offices. This included the Capitol Theatre, a performance space for MMU theatre and acting students. It was also the location of the Manchester Philosophy Society offices, the Green Room Refectory, and an open-air walk-through art gallery.

The building was opened by Manchester City Council in 1973 as a purpose-built adult education college. After the college closed in 1991, MMU (then Manchester Polytechnic) took over the building and renamed it in Tylecote's honour. The building was demolished in 2017.

== Personal papers ==
Her personal papers are located at the John Rylands Library, Manchester. They relate to her career in the Labour Party, Manchester local politics, and adult education. The collection comprises: general correspondence, both personal and official; letters of congratulation and condolence; files relating to particular topics such as adult education, by-elections and general elections, her career in Manchester politics and Mechanics' Institutes; Phythian family correspondence; letters to Lucile Keck of Chicago, from Tylecote and others; Sidebottom family correspondence, including earlier letters from A. J. Balfour (1888, 1893), John Bright (1848, 1864) and Richard Cobden (1864); personal diaries; and photograph albums. There is a collection of 67 watercolours and drawings of scenes from the First World War by her brother, Wilfrid Phythian.

== Works ==
- The Mechanics' Institutes of Lancashire and Yorkshire Before 1851 (Manchester University Press: 1957)
- The Education of Women at Manchester University, 1883 to 1933 (Manchester University Press: 1941)
