= Frank Edward Tylecote =

British doctor (1879–1965)

Frank Edward Tylecote CBE (23 May 1879 – 7 October 1965) was a British medical doctor, and one of the first physicians to draw attention to the connection between smoking and lung cancer.

Born in Cannock, Staffordshire, Tylecote studied medicine at Manchester University, where he served as Professor of Medicine from 1929 to 1940, when he became emeritus professor. His publications included Diagnosis and Treatment in Diseases of the Lungs in 1927, and he was President of the National Smoke Abatement Society for two years.

He was made a Commander of the Order of the British Empire in 1956, and served as a city councillor, first for the Liberal Party (UK) from 1931 to 1946 and then as a Conservative, becoming a justice of the peace in 1934 and an Alderman in 1949. During part of this time he was chairman of the city's Public Health Committee. His second wife was the Labour Party politician, activist and adult educationalist Dame Mabel Tylecote.

== Publications (selected) ==
- 1927: Diagnosis & Treatment in Diseases of the Lungs. London: Humphrey Milford (with a contribution from George Fletcher, Assistant Tuberculosis Officer, Lancashire County Council)
