= All Saints' (ward) =

- Ward
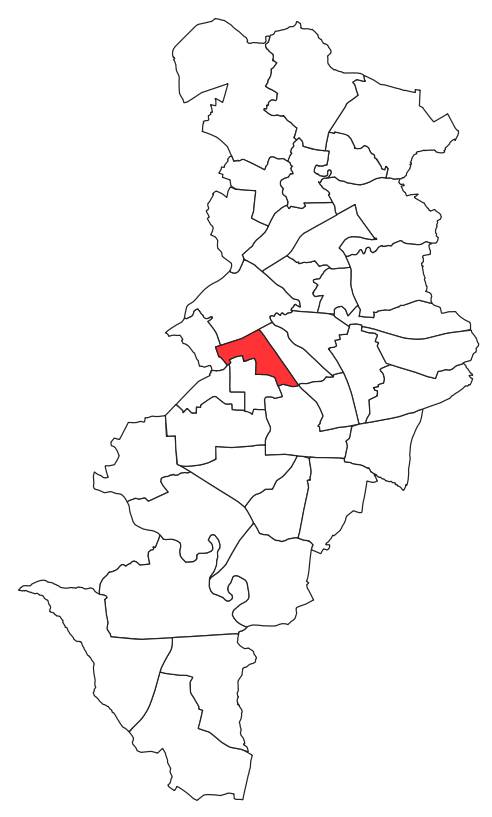
- All Saints' ward (1954) within Manchester

- Coat of arms
- Interactive map of All Saints'
- Country: United Kingdom
- Constituent country: England
- Region: North West England
- County borough: Manchester
- Created: December 1838
- Named for: All Saints'

Government
  - Type: Unicameral
  - Body: Manchester City Council
- UK Parliamentary Constituency: Manchester Exchange

All Saints' was an electoral division of Manchester City Council which was represented from 1838 until 1971. It covered a part of Chorlton-on-Medlock and was later expanded to also include parts of Hulme.

== Overview ==
All Saints' ward was one of the fifteen municipal wards created in 1838, when the Manchester Borough Council was granted a Charter of Incorporation under the provisions of the Municipal Corporations Act 1835.

Initially, the ward covered the western half of Chorlton-on-Medlock township, which had been absorbed into Manchester by the borough's Charter of Incorporation. Its original boundaries remained in place until 1919, when the Greenheys area was transferred to the Moss Side East ward. A further boundary revision took place in 1950, when part of Hulme was transferred from the former Medlock Street ward. The ward was abolished in 1971, with most of its area being transferred to the new Hulme and Moss Side wards.

From 1838 until 1885, the ward formed part of the Manchester Parliamentary constituency. From 1885 until 1918, it was split between the Manchester South and Manchester East Parliamentary constituencies. From 1918 until 1950, it was part of the Manchester Moss Side Parliamentary constituency. From 1950 until its abolition, it was part of the Manchester Exchange Parliamentary constituency.

== Councillors ==
Election	Councillor	Councillor	Councillor
1838	Henry Marsland (Lib)	Samuel Dukinfield Darbishire (Lib)	Samuel Eveleigh (Lib)
1839	Henry Marsland (Lib)	Samuel Dukinfield Darbishire (Lib)	Samuel Eveleigh (Lib)
1840	Henry Marsland (Lib)	Samuel Dukinfield Darbishire (Lib)	Samuel Eveleigh (Lib)
1841	Henry Marsland (Lib)	Samuel Dukinfield Darbishire (Lib)	Samuel Eveleigh (Lib)
1842	Henry Marsland (Lib)	Samuel Dukinfield Darbishire (Lib)	Samuel Eveleigh (Lib)
1843	Henry Marsland (Lib)	Joshua Stockwell (Lib)	Samuel Eveleigh (Lib)
1844	Sidney Potter (Lib)	Joshua Stockwell (Lib)	Samuel Eveleigh (Lib)
1845	Sidney Potter (Lib)	Joshua Stockwell (Lib)	Robert Anlezark Pilling (Lib)
(1845-1872)
1872	J. Little (Lib)	W. Batty (Lib)	T. Potts (Con)
1873	J. Little (Lib)	C. Walker (Lib)	T. Potts (Con)
1874	J. Little (Lib)	C. Walker (Lib)	T. Potts (Con)
1875	J. Little (Lib)	C. Walker (Lib)	J. Duncan (Lib)
1876	J. Little (Lib)	C. Walker (Lib)	J. Duncan (Lib)
1877	J. Little (Lib)	C. Walker (Lib)	J. Duncan (Lib)
1878	J. Little (Lib)	C. Walker (Lib)	T. Potts (Con)
1879	J. Little (Lib)	J. H. Ryder (Lib)	T. Potts (Con)
1880	J. Little (Lib)	J. H. Ryder (Lib)	T. Potts (Con)
1881	J. Little (Lib)	J. H. Ryder (Lib)	T. Potts (Con)
1882	J. Little (Lib)	J. Roberts (Con)	T. Potts (Con)
1883	S. Ashcroft (Con)	J. Roberts (Con)	T. Potts (Con)
1884	S. Ashcroft (Con)	J. Roberts (Con)	A. McDougall (Lib)
1885	S. Ashcroft (Con)	J. Roberts (Con)	A. McDougall (Lib)
1886	S. Ashcroft (Con)	J. Roberts (Con)	A. McDougall (Lib)
1887	S. Ashcroft (Con)	J. Roberts (Con)	A. McDougall (Lib)
1888	S. Ashcroft (Con)	J. Roberts (Con)	A. McDougall (Lib)
1889	S. Ashcroft (Con)	J. Roberts (Con)	A. McDougall (Lib)
1890	S. Ashcroft (Con)	J. Roberts (Con)	A. McDougall (Lib)
1891	S. Ashcroft (Con)	J. Roberts (Con)	A. McDougall (Lib)
1892	S. Ashcroft (Con)	J. Roberts (Con)	A. McDougall (Lib)
January 1893	S. Ashcroft (Con)	S. Locke (Con)	A. McDougall (Lib)
1893	S. Ashcroft (Con)	S. Locke (Con)	A. McDougall (Lib)
1894	S. Ashcroft (Con)	H. C. Smale (Con)	A. McDougall (Lib)
June 1895	M. Arrandale (Lib)	H. C. Smale (Con)	A. McDougall (Lib)
1895	M. Arrandale (Lib)	H. C. Smale (Con)	A. McDougall (Lib)
November 1895	M. Arrandale (Lib)	H. C. Smale (Con)	W. B. Pritchard (Lib)
1896	M. Arrandale (Lib)	H. C. Smale (Con)	W. B. Pritchard (Lib)
1897	M. Arrandale (Lib)	C. Hornby (Con)	W. B. Pritchard (Lib)
1898	M. Arrandale (Lib)	C. Hornby (Con)	W. B. Pritchard (Lib)
1899	M. Arrandale (Lib)	C. Hornby (Con)	W. B. Pritchard (Lib)
1900	M. Arrandale (Lib)	C. Hornby (Con)	W. B. Pritchard (Lib)
1901	M. Arrandale (Lib)	C. Hornby (Con)	W. B. Pritchard (Lib)
1902	M. Arrandale (Lib)	C. Hornby (Con)	W. B. Pritchard (Lib)
1903	M. Arrandale (Lib)	C. Hornby (Con)	W. B. Pritchard (Lib)
1904	H. M. Ross Clyne (Ind)	C. Hornby (Con)	W. B. Pritchard (Lib)
1905	H. M. Ross Clyne (Ind)	C. Hornby (Con)	W. B. Pritchard (Lib)
1906	H. M. Ross Clyne (Ind)	C. Hornby (Con)	W. B. Pritchard (Lib)
1907	H. M. Ross Clyne (Ind)	C. Hornby (Con)	W. B. Pritchard (Lib)
1908	H. M. Ross Clyne (Ind)	C. Hornby (Con)	E. Pierce (Ind)
1909	H. M. Ross Clyne (Ind)	C. Hornby (Con)	E. Pierce (Ind)
1910	M. J. O'Loughlin (Lib)	C. Hornby (Con)	E. Pierce (Ind)
November 1910	M. J. O'Loughlin (Lib)	H. M. Ross Clyne (Ind)	E. Pierce (Ind)
1911	M. J. O'Loughlin (Lib)	H. M. Ross Clyne (Ind)	E. Pierce (Ind)
1912	M. J. O'Loughlin (Lib)	H. M. Ross Clyne (Ind)	E. Pierce (Ind)
1913	M. J. O'Loughlin (Lib)	H. M. Ross Clyne (Ind)	E. Pierce (Ind)
1914	M. J. O'Loughlin (Lib)	H. M. Ross Clyne (Ind)	E. Pierce (Ind)
1919	M. J. O'Loughlin (Lib)	J. E. Hutchinson (Lab)	E. Pierce (Con)
1920	M. J. O'Loughlin (Lib)	J. E. Hutchinson (Lab)	E. Pierce (Con)
1921	M. J. O'Loughlin (Lib)	J. E. Hutchinson (Lab)	E. Pierce (Con)
1922	M. J. O'Loughlin (Lib)	J. E. Hutchinson (Lab)	E. Pierce (Con)
1923	J. O'Loughlin (Lib)	J. E. Hutchinson (Lab)	E. Pierce (Con)
1924	J. O'Loughlin (Lib)	J. E. Hutchinson (Lab)	E. Pierce (Con)
1925	J. O'Loughlin (Lib)	J. E. Hutchinson (Lab)	E. Pierce (Con)
1926	J. Williams (Lab)	J. E. Hutchinson (Lab)	E. Pierce (Con)
1927	J. Williams (Lab)	J. E. Hutchinson (Lab)	W. Davies (Con)
1928	J. Williams (Lab)	J. E. Hutchinson (Lab)	W. Davies (Con)
1929	J. Williams (Lab)	J. E. Hutchinson (Lab)	W. Davies (Con)
1930	J. Williams (Lab)	J. E. Hutchinson (Lab)	W. Davies (Con)
1931	J. Williams (Lab)	J. McMahon (Con)	W. Davies (Con)
1932	R. S. Harper (Con)	J. McMahon (Con)	W. Davies (Con)
October 1933	R. S. Harper (Con)	H. Shaw (Con)	W. Davies (Con)
1933	R. S. Harper (Con)	H. Shaw (Con)	W. Davies (Con)
January 1934	R. S. Harper (Con)	H. Shaw (Con)	A. Lees (Lab)
1934	R. S. Harper (Con)	H. Fryers (Lab)	A. Lees (Lab)
1935	R. S. Harper (Con)	H. Fryers (Lab)	A. Lees (Lab)
1936	R. S. Harper (Con)	H. Fryers (Lab)	J. Procter-Pearson (Con)
November 1936	R. S. Harper (Con)	L. W. Biggs (Con)	J. Procter-Pearson (Con)
1937	R. S. Harper (Con)	L. W. Biggs (Con)	J. Procter-Pearson (Con)
1938	R. S. Harper (Con)	L. W. Biggs (Con)	J. Procter-Pearson (Con)
1945	R. S. Harper (Con)	L. W. Biggs (Con)	F. P. Evans (Lab)
1946	R. S. Harper (Con)	L. W. Biggs (Con)	F. P. Evans (Lab)
1947	R. S. Harper (Con)	L. W. Biggs (Con)	F. P. Evans (Lab)
1949	R. S. Harper (Con)	L. W. Biggs (Con)	N. G. Westbrook (Con)
1950	R. S. Harper (Con)	L. W. Biggs (Con)	N. G. Westbrook (Con)
1951	C. A. Earley (Con)	L. W. Biggs (Con)	N. G. Westbrook (Con)
1952	C. A. Earley (Con)	L. W. Biggs (Con)	A. Littlemore (Lab)
1953	C. A. Earley (Con)	J. H. Parish (Lab)	A. Littlemore (Lab)
1954	F. Hatton (Lab)	J. H. Parish (Lab)	A. Littlemore (Lab)
1955	F. Hatton (Lab)	J. H. Parish (Lab)	A. Littlemore (Lab)
1956	F. Hatton (Lab)	F. P. Evans (Lab)	J. H. Parish (Lab)
1957	F. Hatton (Lab)	F. P. Evans (Lab)	J. H. Parish (Lab)
1958	F. Hatton (Lab)	F. P. Evans (Lab)	T. Thomas (Lab)
1959	F. Hatton (Lab)	F. P. Evans (Lab)	T. Thomas (Lab)
1960	F. Hatton (Lab)	F. P. Evans (Lab)	T. Thomas (Lab)
1961	F. Hatton (Lab)	F. P. Evans (Lab)	T. Thomas (Lab)
1962	F. Hatton (Lab)	F. P. Evans (Lab)	T. Thomas (Lab)
1963	F. Hatton (Lab)	F. P. Evans (Lab)	T. Thomas (Lab)
1964	F. Hatton (Lab)	F. P. Evans (Lab)	T. Thomas (Lab)
1965	F. Hatton (Lab)	H. Conway (Lab)	T. Thomas (Lab)
1966	F. Hatton (Lab)	H. Conway (Lab)	T. Thomas (Lab)
1967	F. Hatton (Lab)	H. Conway (Lab)	T. Thomas (Lab)
1968	F. Hatton (Lab)	H. Conway (Lab)	T. Thomas (Lab)
1969	F. Hatton (Lab)	H. Conway (Lab)	T. Thomas (Lab)
1970	F. Hatton (Lab)	H. Conway (Lab)	T. Thomas (Lab)

== Elections ==
=== Elections in 1830s ===
==== December 1838 ====
1838 (3 vacancies)
Party	Candidate	Votes	%	±%
Liberal	Henry Marsland	150	100.0	
Liberal	Samuel Dukinfield Darbishire	149	99.3	
Liberal	Samuel Eveleigh	149	99.3	
Turnout		150		
Liberal win (new seat)				
Liberal win (new seat)				
Liberal win (new seat)				

==== November 1839 ====
1839
Party	Candidate	Votes	%	±%
Liberal	Samuel Eveleigh*	uncontested		
Liberal hold		Swing		

=== Elections in 1840s ===
==== November 1840 ====
1840
Party	Candidate	Votes	%	±%
Liberal	Samuel Dukinfield Darbishire*	uncontested		
Liberal hold		Swing		

==== November 1841 ====
1841
Party	Candidate	Votes	%	±%
Liberal	Henry Marsland	uncontested		
Liberal hold		Swing		

==== November 1842 ====
1842
Party	Candidate	Votes	%	±%
Liberal	Samuel Eveleigh*	uncontested		
Liberal hold		Swing		

==== November 1843 ====
1843
Party	Candidate	Votes	%	±%
Liberal	Joshua Stockwell	uncontested		
Liberal hold		Swing		

==== November 1844 ====
1844
Party	Candidate	Votes	%	±%
Liberal	Sidney Potter	uncontested		
Liberal hold		Swing		

==== November 1845 ====
1845
Party	Candidate	Votes	%	±%
Liberal	Robert Anlezark Pilling	uncontested		
Liberal hold		Swing		

=== Elections in the 1870s ===
==== November 1872 ====
1872
Party	Candidate	Votes	%	±%
Conservative	T. Potts	806	50.8	
Liberal	T. Clowes*	782	49.2	
Majority		24	1.6	
Turnout		1,588		
Conservative gain from Liberal		Swing		

==== November 1873 ====
1873
Party	Candidate	Votes	%	±%
Liberal	C. Walker	1,257	59.5	+10.3
Conservative	J. E. Middlehurst	856	40.5	−10.3
Majority		401	19.0	
Turnout		2,113		
Liberal hold		Swing		

==== November 1874 ====
1874
Party	Candidate	Votes	%	±%
Liberal	J. Little*	1,058	62.3	+2.8
Conservative	W. Sanderson	641	37.7	−2.8
Majority		417	24.6	+5.6
Turnout		1,699		
Liberal hold		Swing		

==== November 1875 ====
1875
Party	Candidate	Votes	%	±%
Liberal	J. Duncan	1,008	52.6	−9.7
Conservative	T. Potts*	909	47.4	+9.7
Majority		99	5.2	−19.4
Turnout		1,917		
Liberal gain from Conservative		Swing		

==== November 1876 ====
1876
Party	Candidate	Votes	%	±%
Liberal	C. Walker*	1,021	54.0	+1.4
Conservative	W. T. Windsor	869	46.0	−1.4
Majority		152	8.0	+2.8
Turnout		1,890		
Liberal hold		Swing		

==== November 1877 ====
1877
Party	Candidate	Votes	%	±%
Liberal	J. Little*	uncontested		
Liberal hold		Swing		

==== November 1878 ====
1878
Party	Candidate	Votes	%	±%
Conservative	T. Potts	942	50.3	N/A
Liberal	J. Whiteley	929	49.7	N/A
Majority		13	0.6	N/A
Turnout		1,871		
Conservative gain from Liberal		Swing		

==== November 1879 ====
1879
Party	Candidate	Votes	%	±%
Liberal	J. H. Ryder	1,229	54.7	+5.0
Conservative	J. Roberts	1,018	45.3	−5.0
Majority		211	9.4	
Turnout		2,247		
Liberal hold		Swing		

=== Elections in 1880s ===
==== November 1880 ====
1880
Party	Candidate	Votes	%	±%
Liberal	J. Little*	uncontested		
Liberal hold		Swing		

==== November 1881 ====
1881
Party	Candidate	Votes	%	±%
Conservative	T. Potts*	853	58.9	N/A
Independent	C. J. Herford	596	41.1	N/A
Majority		257	17.8	N/A
Turnout		1,449		
Conservative hold		Swing		

==== November 1882 ====
1882
Party	Candidate	Votes	%	±%
Conservative	J. Roberts	994	54.1	−4.8
Liberal	J. H. Ryder*	842	45.9	N/A
Majority		152	8.2	−9.6
Turnout		1,836		
Conservative gain from Liberal		Swing		

==== November 1883 ====
1883
Party	Candidate	Votes	%	±%
Conservative	S. Ashcroft	881	57.5	+3.4
Liberal	J. Little*	652	42.5	−3.4
Majority		229	15.0	+6.8
Turnout		1,533		
Conservative gain from Liberal		Swing		

==== November 1884 ====
1884
Party	Candidate	Votes	%	±%
Liberal	A. McDougall	1,101	53.0	+10.5
Conservative	T. Potts*	975	47.0	−10.5
Majority		126	6.0	
Turnout		2,076		
Liberal gain from Conservative		Swing		

==== November 1885 ====
1885
Party	Candidate	Votes	%	±%
Conservative	J. Roberts*	uncontested		
Conservative hold		Swing		

==== November 1886 ====
1886
Party	Candidate	Votes	%	±%
Conservative	S. Ashcroft*	uncontested		
Conservative hold		Swing		

==== November 1887 ====
1887
Party	Candidate	Votes	%	±%
Liberal	A. McDougall*	uncontested		
Liberal hold		Swing		

==== November 1888 ====
1888
Party	Candidate	Votes	%	±%
Conservative	J. Roberts*	uncontested		
Conservative hold		Swing		

==== November 1889 ====
1889
Party	Candidate	Votes	%	±%
Conservative	S. Ashcroft*	1,424	59.2	N/A
Liberal	W. B. Pritchard	982	40.8	N/A
Majority		442	18.4	N/A
Turnout		2,406		
Conservative hold		Swing		

=== Elections in 1890s ===
==== November 1890 ====
1890
Party	Candidate	Votes	%	±%
Liberal	A. McDougall*	1,545	59.4	+18.6
Conservative	C. Law	1,054	40.6	−18.6
Majority		491	18.8	
Turnout		2,599		
Liberal hold		Swing		

==== November 1891 ====
1891
Party	Candidate	Votes	%	±%
Conservative	J. Roberts*	uncontested		
Conservative hold		Swing		

==== November 1892 ====
1892
Party	Candidate	Votes	%	±%
Conservative	S. Ashcroft*	uncontested		
Conservative hold		Swing		

==== January 1893 (by-election) ====
By-election: 17 January 1893
Party	Candidate	Votes	%	±%
Conservative	S. Locke	1,200	54.1	N/A
Liberal	J. Nasmith	1,017	45.9	N/A
Majority		183	8.2	N/A
Turnout		2,217		
Conservative hold		Swing		

==== November 1893 ====
1893
Party	Candidate	Votes	%	±%
Liberal	A. McDougall*	uncontested		
Liberal hold		Swing		

==== November 1894 ====
1894
Party	Candidate	Votes	%	±%
Conservative	H. C. Smale	1,041	60.3	N/A
Ind. Labour Party	M. Deller	686	39.7	N/A
Majority		355	20.6	N/A
Turnout		1,727		
Conservative hold		Swing		

==== June 1895 (by-election) ====
By-election: 24 June 1895
Party	Candidate	Votes	%	±%
Liberal	M. Arrandale	854	53.4	N/A
Conservative	A. Fulton	746	46.6	−13.7
Majority		108	6.8	
Turnout		1,600		
Liberal gain from Conservative		Swing		

==== November 1895 ====
1895
Party	Candidate	Votes	%	±%
Liberal	M. Arrandale*	1,031	51.3	N/A
Conservative	A. Fulton	977	48.7	−11.6
Majority		54	2.6	
Turnout		2,008		
Liberal hold		Swing		

==== November 1895 (by-election) ====
By-election: 22 November 1895
Party	Candidate	Votes	%	±%
Liberal	W. B. Pritchard	968	53.4	+2.1
Conservative	G. Simpson	846	46.6	−2.1
Majority		122	6.8	+4.2
Turnout		1,814		
Liberal hold		Swing		

==== November 1896 ====
1896
Party	Candidate	Votes	%	±%
Liberal	W. B. Pritchard*	uncontested		
Liberal hold		Swing		

==== November 1897 ====
1897
Party	Candidate	Votes	%	±%
Conservative	C. Hornby	1,175	51.2	N/A
Liberal	J. D. Pennington	1,119	48.8	N/A
Majority		56	2.4	N/A
Turnout		2,294		
Conservative hold		Swing		

==== November 1898 ====
1898
Party	Candidate	Votes	%	±%
Liberal	M. Arrandale*	uncontested		
Liberal hold		Swing		

==== November 1899 ====
1899
Party	Candidate	Votes	%	±%
Liberal	W. B. Pritchard*	uncontested		
Liberal hold		Swing		

=== Elections in 1900s ===
==== November 1900 ====
1900
Party	Candidate	Votes	%	±%
Conservative	C. Hornby*	uncontested		
Conservative hold		Swing		

==== November 1901 ====
1901
Party	Candidate	Votes	%	±%
Liberal	M. Arrandale*	uncontested		
Liberal hold		Swing		

==== November 1902 ====
1902
Party	Candidate	Votes	%	±%
Liberal	W. B. Pritchard*	879	50.1	N/A
Independent	H. M. Ross Clyne	877	49.9	N/A
Majority		2	0.2	N/A
Turnout		1,756		
Liberal hold		Swing		

==== November 1903 ====
1903
Party	Candidate	Votes	%	±%
Conservative	C. Hornby*	uncontested		
Conservative hold		Swing		

==== November 1904 ====
1904
Party	Candidate	Votes	%	±%
Independent	H. M. Ross Clyne	1,049	55.0	N/A
Liberal	M. Arrandale*	858	45.0	N/A
Majority		191	10.0	N/A
Turnout		1,907		
Independent gain from Liberal		Swing		

==== November 1905 ====
1905
Party	Candidate	Votes	%	±%
Liberal	W. B. Pritchard*	uncontested		
Liberal hold		Swing		

==== November 1906 ====
1906
Party	Candidate	Votes	%	±%
Conservative	C. Hornby*	uncontested		
Conservative hold		Swing		

==== November 1907 ====
1907
Party	Candidate	Votes	%	±%
Independent	H. M. Ross Clyne*	1,117	59.1	N/A
Conservative	P. Stallard	772	40.9	N/A
Majority		345	18.2	N/A
Turnout		1,889		
Independent hold		Swing		

==== November 1908 ====
1908
Party	Candidate	Votes	%	±%
Independent	E. Pierce	1,088	56.1	−3.0
Liberal	W. B. Pritchard*	851	43.9	N/A
Majority		237	12.2	−6.0
Turnout		1,939		
Independent gain from Liberal		Swing		

==== November 1909 ====
1909
Party	Candidate	Votes	%	±%
Conservative	C. Hornby*	768	71.0	N/A
Independent	J. E. Hutchinson	314	29.0	−27.1
Majority		454	42.0	
Turnout		1,082		
Conservative hold		Swing		

=== Elections in 1910s ===
==== November 1910 ====
1910
Party	Candidate	Votes	%	±%
Liberal	M. J. O'Loughlin	731	52.2	N/A
Independent	J. E. Hutchinson	670	47.8	+18.8
Majority		61	4.4	
Turnout		1,401		
Liberal gain from Independent		Swing		

==== November 1910 (by-election) ====
By-election: 21 November 1910
Party	Candidate	Votes	%	±%
Independent	H. M. Ross Clyne	984	64.4	+16.6
Liberal	W. Radcliffe	545	35.6	−16.6
Majority		439	28.8	
Turnout		1,529		
Independent gain from Conservative		Swing		

==== November 1911 ====
1911
Party	Candidate	Votes	%	±%
Independent	E. Pierce*	uncontested		
Independent hold		Swing		

==== November 1912 ====
1912
Party	Candidate	Votes	%	±%
Independent	H. M. Ross Clyne*	uncontested		
Independent hold		Swing		

==== November 1913 ====
1913
Party	Candidate	Votes	%	±%
Liberal	M. J. O'Loughlin*	837	59.4	N/A
Independent	J. E. Hutchinson	571	40.6	N/A
Majority		266	18.8	N/A
Turnout		1,408		
Liberal hold		Swing		

==== November 1914 ====
1914
Party	Candidate	Votes	%	±%
Independent	E. Pierce*	uncontested		
Independent hold		Swing		

==== November 1919 ====
1919 (new boundaries)
Party	Candidate	Votes	%	±%
Labour	J. E. Hutchinson	873	53.7	
Independent	H. M. Ross Clyne*	752	46.3	
Majority		121	7.4	
Turnout		1,652	20.6	
Labour gain from Independent		Swing		

=== Elections in 1920s ===
==== November 1920 ====
1920
Party	Candidate	Votes	%	±%
Liberal	M. J. O'Loughlin*	1,285	53.7	N/A
Conservative	J. Goodwin	1,109	46.3	N/A
Labour	H. J. Hanaway	719	23.1	−30.6
Majority		176	5.7	
Turnout		3,113	39.6	+19.0
Liberal hold		Swing		

==== November 1921 ====
1921
Party	Candidate	Votes	%	±%
Conservative	E. Pierce*	1,616	51.3	+5.0
Labour	G. Benson	1,537	48.7	+25.6
Majority		79	2.6	
Turnout		3,153	40.3	+0.7
Conservative hold		Swing		

==== November 1922 ====
1922
Party	Candidate	Votes	%	±%
Labour	J. E. Hutchinson*	1,841	61.3	+12.6
Independent	H. M. Ross Clyne	1,164	38.7	N/A
Majority		677	22.6	
Turnout		3,005	37.0	−3.3
Labour hold		Swing		

==== November 1923 ====
1923
Party	Candidate	Votes	%	±%
Liberal	J. O'Loughlin	1,206	36.6	N/A
Conservative	E. Lewis	1,203	36.5	N/A
Labour	A. M. Thompson	823	25.0	−36.3
Independent	A. W. McKelvin	60	1.8	−36.9
Majority		3	0.1	
Turnout		3,292		
Liberal hold		Swing		

==== November 1924 ====
1924
Party	Candidate	Votes	%	±%
Conservative	E. Pierce*	2,147	60.5	+24.0
Labour	A. M. Thompson	1,400	39.5	+14.5
Majority		747	21.0	
Turnout		3,547		
Conservative hold		Swing		

==== November 1925 ====
1925
Party	Candidate	Votes	%	±%
Labour	J. E. Hutchinson*	1,837	50.2	+10.7
Liberal	W. G. Coltart	1,824	49.8	N/A
Majority		13	0.4	
Turnout		3,661	43.9	
Labour hold		Swing		

==== November 1926 ====
1926
Party	Candidate	Votes	%	±%
Labour	J. Williams	1,701	56.8	+6.6
Conservative	J. O'Loughlin*	1,293	43.2	N/A
Majority		408	13.6	+13.2
Turnout		2,994	34.0	−9.9
Labour gain from Conservative		Swing		

==== November 1927 ====
1927
Party	Candidate	Votes	%	±%
Conservative	W. Davies*	1,725	47.2	+4.0
Labour	J. H. Green	1,047	28.6	−28.2
Liberal	B. McManus	845	23.1	N/A
Residents	A. R. Edwards	40	1.1	N/A
Majority		678	18.6	
Turnout		3,657	43.5	+9.5
Conservative hold		Swing		

==== November 1928 ====
1928
Party	Candidate	Votes	%	±%
Labour	J. E. Hutchinson*	1,959	51.7	+23.1
Conservative	F. Earley	1,788	47.2	0
Residents	A. R. Edwards	39	1.0	−0.1
Majority		171	4.5	
Turnout		3,786	45.5	+2.0
Labour hold		Swing		

==== November 1929 ====
1929
Party	Candidate	Votes	%	±%
Labour	J. Williams*	1,257	44.9	−6.8
Conservative	J. McMahon	955	34.1	−13.1
Ind. Conservative	J. Griffin	569	20.3	N/A
Residents	A. R. Edwards	18	0.6	−0.4
Majority		302	10.8	+6.3
Turnout		2,799	31.3	−14.2
Labour hold		Swing		

=== Elections in 1930s ===
==== November 1930 ====
1930
Party	Candidate	Votes	%	±%
Conservative	W. Davies*	1,808	56.3	+22.2
Labour	L. Corcoran	844	26.3	−18.6
Ind. Conservative	J. Griffin	559	17.4	−2.9
Majority		964	30.0	
Turnout		3,211		
Conservative hold		Swing		

==== November 1931 ====
1931
Party	Candidate	Votes	%	±%
Conservative	J. McMahon	2,502	68.3	+12.0
Labour	A. Trench	1,160	31.7	+5.4
Majority		1,342	36.6	+6.6
Turnout		3,662	41.3	
Conservative gain from Labour		Swing		

==== November 1932 ====
1932
Party	Candidate	Votes	%	±%
Conservative	R. S. Harper	1,598	53.6	+14.7
Labour	J. Williams*	1,383	46.4	+14.7
Majority		215	7.2	−29.4
Turnout		2,981		
Conservative gain from Labour		Swing		

==== October 1933 (by-election) ====
By-election: 3 October 1933
Party	Candidate	Votes	%	±%
Conservative	H. Shaw	1,041	51.4	−2.2
Labour	A. Lees	984	48.6	+2.2
Majority		57	2.8	−4.4
Turnout		2,025		
Conservative hold		Swing		

==== November 1933 ====
1933
Party	Candidate	Votes	%	±%
Conservative	W. Davies*	1,419	50.4	−3.2
Labour	A. Lees	1,395	49.6	+3.2
Majority		24	0.8	−6.4
Turnout		2,814		
Conservative hold		Swing		

==== January 1934 (by-election) ====
By-election: 18 January 1934
Party	Candidate	Votes	%	±%
Labour	A. Lees	1,312	53.0	+3.4
Conservative	C. A. Cave	1,162	47.0	−3.4
Majority		150	6.0	
Turnout		2,474		
Labour gain from Conservative		Swing		

==== November 1934 ====
1934
Party	Candidate	Votes	%	±%
Labour	H. Fryers	1,300	50.4	+0.8
Conservative	H. Shaw*	1,280	49.6	−0.8
Majority		20	0.8	
Turnout		2,580		
Labour gain from Conservative		Swing		

==== November 1935 ====
1935
Party	Candidate	Votes	%	±%
Conservative	R. S. Harper*	1,819	55.7	+6.1
Labour	A. Titt	1,448	44.3	−6.1
Majority		371	11.4	
Turnout		3,267		
Conservative hold		Swing		

==== November 1936 ====
1936
Party	Candidate	Votes	%	±%
Conservative	J. Procter-Pearson	1,608	56.0	+0.3
Labour	D. Hunter	1,263	44.0	−0.3
Majority		345	12.0	+0.6
Turnout		2,871		
Conservative gain from Labour		Swing		

==== November 1936 (by-election) ====
By-election: 19 November 1936
Party	Candidate	Votes	%	±%
Conservative	L. W. Biggs	1,519	58.6	+2.6
Labour	D. Hunter	1,074	41.4	−2.6
Majority		445	17.2	+5.2
Turnout		2,593		
Conservative gain from Labour		Swing		

==== November 1937 ====
1937
Party	Candidate	Votes	%	±%
Conservative	L. W. Biggs*	1,818	61.0	+5.0
Labour	E. A. Gower	1,164	39.0	−5.0
Majority		654	22.0	+1.0
Turnout		2,982		
Conservative hold		Swing		

==== November 1938 ====
1938
Party	Candidate	Votes	%	±%
Conservative	R. S. Harper*	1,817	64.6	+3.6
Labour	E. A. Gower	968	34.4	−4.6
British Union	M. E. Pye	23	0.9	N/A
Residents	L. Whittington	3	0.1	N/A
Majority		849	30.2	+8.2
Turnout		2,811		
Conservative hold		Swing		

=== Elections in 1940s ===
==== November 1945 ====
1945
Party	Candidate	Votes	%	±%
Labour	F. Evans	1,261	52.9	+18.5
Conservative	A. Holberry	1,093	45.8	−18.8
Independent	F. R. Phillips	31	1.3	N/A
Majority		168	7.1	
Turnout		2,385	24.4	
Labour gain from Conservative		Swing		

==== November 1946 ====
1946
Party	Candidate	Votes	%	±%
Conservative	L. W. Biggs*	1,729	51.1	+5.3
Labour	H. C. Moorcroft	1,511	44.6	−8.3
Liberal	M. Pickles	146	4.3	N/A
Majority		218	6.5	
Turnout		3,386		
Conservative hold		Swing		

==== November 1947 ====
1947
Party	Candidate	Votes	%	±%
Conservative	R. S. Harper*	2,668	55.5	+4.4
Labour	J. Lenten	2,135	44.5	−0.1
Majority		533	11.0	+4.5
Turnout		4,803		
Conservative hold		Swing		

==== May 1949 ====
1949
Party	Candidate	Votes	%	±%
Conservative	N. G. Westbrook	2,117	53.8	−1.7
Labour	F. Evans*	1,820	46.2	+1.7
Majority		297	7.6	−3.4
Turnout		3,937		
Conservative gain from Labour		Swing		

=== Elections in 1950s ===
==== May 1950 ====
1950 (new boundaries)
Party	Candidate	Votes	%	±%
Conservative	L. W. Biggs*	2,606	51.7	
Labour	F. P. Evans	2,347	46.5	
Liberal	R. Frere	89	1.8	
Majority		259	5.2	
Turnout		5,042		
Conservative hold		Swing		

==== May 1951 ====
1951
Party	Candidate	Votes	%	±%
Conservative	C. A. Earley	2,620	57.4	+5.7
Labour	F. P. Evans	1,944	42.6	−3.9
Majority		676	14.8	+9.6
Turnout		4,564		
Conservative hold		Swing		

==== May 1952 ====
1952
Party	Candidate	Votes	%	±%
Labour	A. Littlemore	3,337	64.1	+21.5
Conservative	H. Ackerley	1,871	35.9	−21.5
Majority		1,466	28.2	
Turnout		5,208		
Labour gain from Conservative		Swing		

==== May 1953 ====
1953
Party	Candidate	Votes	%	±%
Labour	J. H. Parish	2,816	61.2	−2.9
Conservative	A. Thornhill	1,787	38.8	+2.9
Majority		1,029	22.4	−5.8
Turnout		4,603		
Labour gain from Conservative		Swing		

==== May 1954 ====
1954
Party	Candidate	Votes	%	±%
Labour	F. Hatton	2,854	63.0	+1.8
Conservative	C. A. Earley*	1,676	37.0	−1.8
Majority		1,178	26.0	+3.6
Turnout		4,530		
Labour gain from Conservative		Swing		

==== May 1955 ====
1955
Party	Candidate	Votes	%	±%
Labour	A. Littlemore*	2,368	60.0	−3.0
Conservative	W. J. Geddes	1,581	40.0	+3.0
Majority		787	20.0	−6.0
Turnout		3,949		
Labour hold		Swing		

==== May 1956 ====
1956 (2 vacancies)
Party	Candidate	Votes	%	±%
Labour	F. P. Evans	1,818	64.3	+4.3
Labour	J. H. Parish*	1,728	61.1	+1.1
Conservative	W. J. Geddes	1,056	37.3	−2.7
Majority		672	23.8	+3.8
Turnout		2,829		
Labour hold		Swing		
Labour hold		Swing		

==== May 1957 ====
1957
Party	Candidate	Votes	%	±%
Labour	F. Hatton*	2,224	70.8	+6.5
Conservative	W. J. Geddes	917	29.2	−8.1
Majority		1,307	41.6	+17.8
Turnout		3,141		
Labour hold		Swing		

==== May 1958 ====
1958
Party	Candidate	Votes	%	±%
Labour	T. Thomas	1,980	77.5	+6.7
Conservative	W. J. Geddes	574	22.5	−6.7
Majority		1,406	55.0	+13.4
Turnout		2,554		
Labour hold		Swing		

==== May 1959 ====
1959
Party	Candidate	Votes	%	±%
Labour	F. P. Evans*	1,810	72.7	−4.8
Conservative	R. W. Phillips	679	27.3	+4.8
Majority		1,131	45.4	−9.6
Turnout		2,489		
Labour hold		Swing		

=== Elections in 1960s ===
==== May 1960 ====
1960
Party	Candidate	Votes	%	±%
Labour	F. Hatton*	1,418	68.6	−4.1
Conservative	R. W. Phillips	650	31.4	+4.1
Majority		768	37.2	−8.2
Turnout		2,068		
Labour hold		Swing		

==== May 1961 ====
1961
Party	Candidate	Votes	%	±%
Labour	T. Thomas*	1,511	71.5	+2.9
Conservative	R. W. Phillips	603	28.5	−2.9
Majority		908	43.0	+5.8
Turnout		2,114		
Labour hold		Swing		

==== May 1962 ====
1962
Party	Candidate	Votes	%	±%
Labour	F. P. Evans*	1,488	74.0	+2.5
Conservative	R. W. Phillips	392	19.5	−9.0
Union Movement	M. Kennedy	131	6.5	N/A
Majority		1,096	54.5	+11.5
Turnout		2,011		
Labour hold		Swing		

==== May 1963 ====
1963
Party	Candidate	Votes	%	±%
Labour	F. Hatton*	1,754	82.0	+8.0
Conservative	R. W. Phillips	386	18.0	−1.5
Majority		1,368	64.0	+9.5
Turnout		2,140		
Labour hold		Swing		

==== May 1964 ====
1964
Party	Candidate	Votes	%	±%
Labour	T. Thomas*	1,014	73.5	−8.5
Conservative	R. W. Phillips	366	26.5	+8.5
Majority		648	47.0	−17.0
Turnout		1,380		
Labour hold		Swing		

==== May 1965 ====
1965
Party	Candidate	Votes	%	±%
Labour	H. Conway	665	56.1	−17.4
Conservative	P. Clemerson	521	43.9	+17.4
Majority		144	12.2	−34.8
Turnout		1,186		
Labour hold		Swing		

==== May 1966 ====
1966
Party	Candidate	Votes	%	±%
Labour	F. Hatton*	668	68.5	+12.4
Conservative	P. Clemerson	307	31.5	−12.4
Majority		361	37.0	+24.8
Turnout		975		
Labour hold		Swing		

==== May 1967 ====
1967
Party	Candidate	Votes	%	±%
Labour	T. Thomas*	304	53.3	−15.2
Conservative	F. Hewerdine	266	46.7	+15.2
Majority		38	6.6	−30.4
Turnout		570		
Labour hold		Swing		

==== May 1968 ====
1968
Party	Candidate	Votes	%	±%
Labour	H. Conway*	309	52.3	−1.0
Conservative	F. Hewerdine	282	47.7	+1.0
Majority		27	4.6	−2.0
Turnout		591		
Labour hold		Swing		

==== May 1969 ====
1969
Party	Candidate	Votes	%	±%
Labour	F. Hatton*	448	60.8	+8.5
Conservative	F. Hewerdine	289	39.2	−8.5
Majority		159	21.6	+17.0
Turnout		737		
Labour hold		Swing		

=== Elections in 1970s ===
==== May 1970 ====
1970
Party	Candidate	Votes	%	±%
Labour	T. Thomas*	1,044	70.9	+10.1
Conservative	F. P. Heenan	418	28.4	−10.8
Residents	E. T. Beach	11	0.7	N/A
Majority		626	42.5	+20.9
Turnout		1,473		
Labour hold		Swing		

== See also ==
- Manchester City Council
- Manchester City Council elections
