= 1929 Manchester City Council election =

Local election in Manchester

- 1 November 1929

35 of 140 seats on Manchester City Council 71 seats needed for a majority
	First party	Second party	Third party
Party	Conservative	Labour	Liberal
Last election	13 seats, 40.9%	14 seats, 40.6%	7 seats, 15.5%
Seats before	59	48	28
Seats won	8	20	7
Seats after	54	51	30
Seat change	▼5	▲3	▲2
Popular vote	40,819	42,265	22,086
Percentage	38.1%	39.5%	20.6%
Swing	▼2.8%	▼1.1%	▲5.1%
	Fourth party
Party	Independent
Last election	1 seats, 1.2%
Seats before	4
Seats won	0
Seats after	4
Seat change	Steady
Popular vote	160
Percentage	0.1%
Swing	▼1.1%
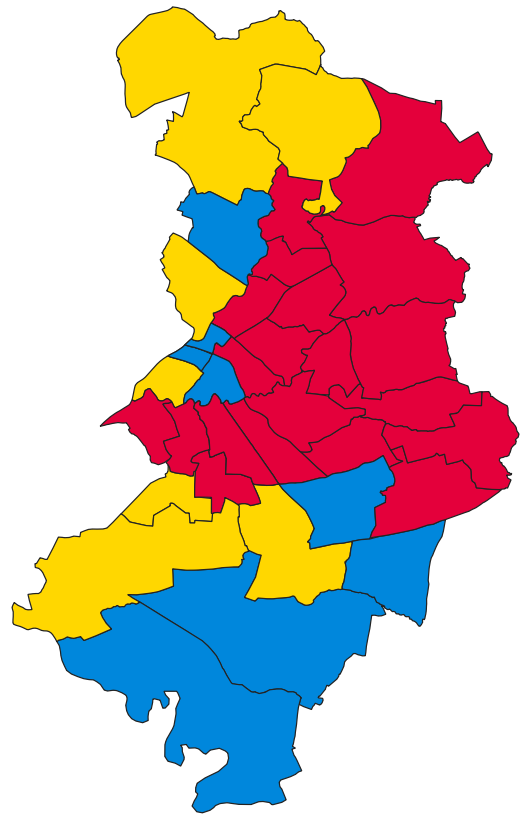
- Map of results of 1929 election
Leader of the Council before election
No overall control
Leader of the Council after election
No overall control

Elections to Manchester City Council were held on Friday, 1 November 1929. One third of the councillors seats were up for election, with each successful candidate to serve a three-year term of office. The council remained under no overall control.

== Election result ==
Party	Votes		Seats			Full Council	
Conservative Party	40,819 (38.1%)	▼2.8	8 (22.9%)	8 / 35	▼5	54 (38.6%)	54 / 140
Labour Party	42,265 (39.5%)	▼1.1	20 (57.1%)	20 / 35	▲3	51 (36.4%)	51 / 140
Liberal Party	22,086 (20.6%)	▲5.1	7 (20.0%)	7 / 35	▲2	30 (21.4%)	30 / 140
Independent	160 (0.1%)	▼1.1	0 (0.0%)	0 / 35	Steady	4 (2.9%)	4 / 140
English League for the Taxation of Land Values	0 (0.0%)	Steady	0 (0.0%)	0 / 35	Steady	1 (0.7%)	1 / 140
Residents	1,084 (1.0%)	▲0.2	0 (0.0%)	0 / 35	Steady	0 (0.0%)	0 / 140
Independent Conservative	569 (0.5%)	▼0.1	0 (0.0%)	0 / 35	Steady	0 (0.0%)	0 / 140
Communist	87 (0.1%)	Steady	0 (0.0%)	0 / 35	Steady	0 (0.0%)	0 / 140

=== Full council ===
↓
51	30	1	4	54

=== Aldermen ===
↓
4	10	1	20

=== Councillors ===
↓
47	20	1	3	34

== Ward results ==
=== All Saints' ===
All Saints'
Party	Candidate	Votes	%	±%
Labour	J. Williams*	1,257	44.9	−6.8
Conservative	J. McMahon	955	34.1	−13.1
Ind. Conservative	J. Griffin	569	20.3	N/A
Residents	A. R. Edwards	18	0.6	−0.4
Majority		302	10.8	+6.3
Turnout		2,799	31.3	−14.2
Labour hold		Swing		

=== Ardwick ===
Ardwick
Party	Candidate	Votes	%	±%
Labour	J. M. Wharton*	2,404	60.7	+17.1
Conservative	G. Grocock	1,556	39.3	−16.8
Majority		848	21.4	
Turnout		3,960	36.5	−24.0
Labour hold		Swing		

=== Beswick ===
Beswick
Party	Candidate	Votes	%	±%
Labour	W. Robinson*	uncontested		
Labour hold		Swing		

=== Blackley ===
Blackley
Party	Candidate	Votes	%	±%
Liberal	T. S. Williams*	2,255	67.3	+6.0
Labour	J. Gandy-Bewick	1,094	32.7	−2.0
Majority		1,161	34.6	+8.0
Turnout		3,349	32.4	−13.5
Liberal hold		Swing		

=== Bradford ===
Bradford
Party	Candidate	Votes	%	±%
Labour	E. J. Hart*	uncontested		
Labour hold		Swing		

=== Cheetham ===
Cheetham
Party	Candidate	Votes	%	±%
Conservative	J. C. Grime*	uncontested		
Conservative hold		Swing		

=== Chorlton-cum-Hardy ===
Chorlton-cum-Hardy
Party	Candidate	Votes	%	±%
Liberal	J. W. Maitland*	3,711	52.8	+14.2
Conservative	J. Lees-Jones	3,321	47.2	+0.5
Majority		390	5.6	
Turnout		7,032	34.4	−19.6
Liberal hold		Swing		

=== Collegiate Church ===
Collegiate Church
Party	Candidate	Votes	%	±%
Liberal	A. S. Moss	770	43.7	N/A
Conservative	J. Hill*	682	38.7	−27.0
Labour	A. Eyres	312	17.6	−16.7
Majority		88	5.0	
Turnout		1,764	40.2	−3.1
Liberal gain from Conservative		Swing		

=== Collyhurst ===
Collyhurst
Party	Candidate	Votes	%	±%
Labour	W. Johnston*	2,776	68.4	+17.1
Conservative	T. C. Owtram	1,280	31.6	−15.7
Majority		1,496	36.8	+32.8
Turnout		4,056	39.7	−24.4
Labour hold		Swing		

=== Crumpsall ===
Crumpsall
Party	Candidate	Votes	%	±%
Liberal	S. Meadowcroft	1,449	41.5	−18.2
Conservative	G. S. Grindley*	1,234	35.3	−5.0
Labour	C. E. P. Stott	660	18.9	N/A
Independent	W. Dennison	149	4.3	N/A
Majority		215	6.2	−13.2
Turnout		3,492	50.1	−7.3
Liberal gain from Conservative		Swing		

=== Didsbury ===
Didsbury
Party	Candidate	Votes	%	±%
Conservative	G. H. White*	2,071	50.6	−0.4
Liberal	D. Porter	2,019	49.4	+0.4
Majority		52	1.2	−0.8
Turnout		4,090	50.8	−6.0
Conservative hold		Swing		

=== Exchange ===
Exchange
Party	Candidate	Votes	%	±%
Conservative	A. S. Harper*	uncontested		
Conservative hold		Swing		

=== Gorton North ===
Gorton North
Party	Candidate	Votes	%	±%
Labour	S. H. Hitchbun*	uncontested		
Labour hold		Swing		

=== Gorton South ===
Gorton South
Party	Candidate	Votes	%	±%
Labour	T. H. Adams*	3,237	69.1	+3.1
Conservative	C. Taylor	1,445	30.9	−2.2
Majority		1,792	38.2	+5.3
Turnout		6,000	37.8	−15.9
Labour hold		Swing		

=== Harpurhey ===
Harpurhey
Party	Candidate	Votes	%	±%
Labour	J. Howard*	2,318	53.5	0
Conservative	F. Sutton	2,014	46.5	+1.5
Majority		304	7.0	−1.5
Turnout		4,332	41.3	−19.8
Labour hold		Swing		

=== Levenshulme ===
Levenshulme
Party	Candidate	Votes	%	±%
Conservative	H. M. Emery*	2,510	66.2	N/A
Labour	W. N. Bayes	1,281	33.8	+5.9
Majority		1,229	32.4	
Turnout		3,791	36.5	−10.9
Conservative hold		Swing		

=== Longsight ===
Longsight
Party	Candidate	Votes	%	±%
Conservative	W. P. Jackson*	2,718	64.8	+2.5
Labour	J. Garside	1,474	35.2	−2.0
Majority		1,244	29.6	+4.5
Turnout		4,192	38.6	−15.2
Conservative hold		Swing		

=== Medlock Street ===
Medlock Street
Party	Candidate	Votes	%	±%
Labour	E. Chorlton*	2,274	55.3	+4.8
Conservative	A. W. L. Smith	1,796	43.7	−3.1
Residents	A. R. Edwards	39	1.0	−1.8
Majority		478	11.6	+7.7
Turnout		4,109	32.1	−13.3
Labour hold		Swing		

=== Miles Platting ===
Miles Platting
Party	Candidate	Votes	%	±%
Labour	A. James*	3,621	64.7	+9.4
Conservative	S. Bloor	1,954	34.9	−9.3
Residents	A. R. Edwards	18	0.4	−0.1
Majority		1,667	29.8	+18.7
Turnout		5,593	50.2	−15.9
Labour hold		Swing		

=== Moss Side East ===
Moss Side East
Party	Candidate	Votes	%	±%
Labour	J. N. Wallace	955	36.0	+21.0
Conservative	A. H. Townend	950	35.8	−0.4
Liberal	R. Caradoc Roberts	731	27.6	N/A
Residents	A. R. Edwards	17	0.6	−0.3
Majority		5	0.2	
Turnout		2,653	31.3	−17.3
Labour gain from Liberal		Swing		

=== Moss Side West ===
Moss Side West
Party	Candidate	Votes	%	±%
Liberal	J. Mathewson Watson*	2,349	74.8	N/A
Labour	R. McKeon	793	25.2	−5.0
Majority		1,556	49.6	
Turnout		3,142	33.7	−7.9
Liberal hold		Swing		

=== Moston ===
Moston
Party	Candidate	Votes	%	±%
Labour	F. Gregson	2,369	48.5	−7.7
Conservative	M. McRay	1,563	32.0	−11.3
Liberal	B. Adler	955	19.5	N/A
Majority		806	16.5	+3.6
Turnout		4,887	43.8	−14.6
Labour hold		Swing		

=== New Cross ===
New Cross
Party	Candidate	Votes	%	±%
Labour	W. Hallows*	3,157	57.3	+21.0
Conservative	S. Holmes	2,353	42.7	−21.0
Majority		804	15.0	
Turnout		5,510	50.4	−14.6
Labour hold		Swing		

=== Newton Heath ===
Newton Heath
Party	Candidate	Votes	%	±%
Labour	H. M. Mitchell*	2,349	52.5	+3.8
Conservative	L. Turner	2,128	47.5	−3.2
Majority		221	5.0	
Turnout		4,477	44.2	−15.6
Labour hold		Swing		

=== Openshaw ===
Openshaw
Party	Candidate	Votes	%	±%
Labour	W. H. Oldfield*	2,559	96.7	+24.1
Communist	F. J. Bright	87	3.3	+1.0
Majority		2,472	93.4	+45.5
Turnout		2,646	25.8	−32.6
Labour hold		Swing		

=== Oxford ===
Oxford
Party	Candidate	Votes	%	±%
Conservative	R. W. Shepherd*	uncontested		
Conservative hold		Swing		

=== Rusholme ===
Rusholme
Party	Candidate	Votes	%	±%
Liberal	C. H. Barlow*	2,083	58.4	+0.2
Conservative	A. Ellison	1,417	39.8	N/A
Residents	A. M. Edwards	64	1.8	+1.5
Majority		666	18.6	−16.8
Turnout		3,564	36.2	−10.8
Liberal hold		Swing		

=== St. Ann's ===
St. Ann's
Party	Candidate	Votes	%	±%
Conservative	R. A. Larmuth*	694	69.7	N/A
Liberal	A. Payne	301	30.3	N/A
Majority		393	39.4	N/A
Turnout		995	44.2	N/A
Conservative hold		Swing		

=== St. Clement's ===
St. Clement's
Party	Candidate	Votes	%	±%
Labour	A. E. Jones	772	38.8	+8.4
Conservative	J. Goodwin*	662	33.3	−3.9
Liberal	C. H. Travis	543	27.3	−5.1
Independent	W. H. Booth	11	0.6	N/A
Majority		110	5.5	
Turnout		1,988	58.0	−10.8
Labour gain from Conservative		Swing		

=== St. George's ===
St. George's
Party	Candidate	Votes	%	±%
Labour	J. G. Clapham*	2,000	49.3	−9.0
Conservative	F. James	1,178	29.0	−11.4
Residents	A. R. Edwards	882	21.7	+20.4
Majority		822	20.3	+2.4
Turnout		4,060	32.5	−6.8
Labour hold		Swing		

=== St. John's ===
St. John's
Party	Candidate	Votes	%	±%
Liberal	M. A. Gibbons	900	54.9	N/A
Conservative	J. E. Burgess	740	45.1	−48.1
Majority		160	9.8	
Turnout		1,640	61.6	+22.5
Liberal gain from Conservative		Swing		

=== St. Luke's ===
St. Luke's
Party	Candidate	Votes	%	±%
Labour	A. Mostyn	1,481	37.3	+26.7
Conservative	E. Davies	1,363	34.3	+2.8
Liberal	A. Coogan	807	20.3	−24.8
Residents	A. R. Edwards	46	1.1	−1.4
Majority		118	3.0	
Turnout		3,967	36.7	−9.4
Labour gain from Conservative		Swing		

=== St. Mark's ===
St. Mark's
Party	Candidate	Votes	%	±%
Labour	C. Wood*	3,122	76.2	+8.4
Conservative	E. Filmer	973	23.8	−7.3
Majority		2,149	52.4	+15.7
Turnout		4,095	37.2	−30.9
Labour hold		Swing		

=== St. Michael's ===
St. Michael's
Party	Candidate	Votes	%	±%
Labour	J. Reilly*	uncontested		
Labour hold		Swing		

=== Withington ===
Withington
Party	Candidate	Votes	%	±%
Conservative	J. S. Hill*	3,262	50.4	+2.5
Liberal	F. E. Tylecote	3,213	49.6	−1.2
Majority		49	0.8	
Turnout		6,475	34.8	−12.5
Conservative hold		Swing		

== Aldermanic elections ==
=== Aldermanic election, 3 September 1930 ===
Caused by the death on 30 July 1930 of Alderman William Thomas Dagnall (Conservative, elected as an alderman by the council on 15 October 1919).

In his place, Councillor James Reilly (Labour, St. Michael's, elected 1 Nov 1913) was elected as an alderman by the council on 3 September 1930.

Party	Alderman	Ward	Term expires
Labour	James Reilly	St. Michael's	1934

== By-elections between 1929 and 1930 ==
=== St. John's, 30 May 1930 ===
Caused by the death of Councillor Alfred Charles Gardner (Conservative, St. John's, elected 1 November 1927) on 13 May 1930.

St. John's
Party	Candidate	Votes	%	±%
Conservative	J. E. Burgess	768	45.7	+0.6
Liberal	F. E. Tylecote	718	42.7	−12.2
Labour	L. M. Lever	194	11.6	N/A
Majority		50	3.0	
Turnout		1,680	63.1	+1.5
Conservative hold		Swing		

=== St. Michael's, 8 September 1930 ===
Caused by the election as an alderman of Councillor James Reilly (Labour, St. Michael's, elected 1 Nov 1913) on 3 September 1930, following the death on 30 July 1930 of Alderman William Thomas Dagnall (Conservative, elected as an alderman by the council on 15 October 1919).

St. Michael's
Party	Candidate	Votes	%	±%
Labour	E. Rafferty	uncontested		
Labour hold		Swing		
