= 1895 Manchester City Council election =

Local election in Manchester

- 1 November 1895

26 of 104 seats to Manchester City Council 53 seats needed for a majority
	First party	Second party	Third party
Party	Liberal	Conservative	Liberal Unionist
Last election	8 seats, 33.3%	14 seats, 40.1%	2 seats, 6.6%
Seats before	50	45	7
Seats won	15	11	0
Seats after	49	46	7
Seat change	▼1	▲1	Steady
Popular vote	15,075	16,823	0
Percentage	40.8%	45.5%	0.0%
Swing	▲7.5%	▲5.4%	▼6.6%
	Fourth party
Party	Ind. Labour Party
Last election	2 seats, 19.8%
Seats before	2
Seats won	0
Seats after	2
Seat change	Steady
Popular vote	3,824
Percentage	10.3%
Swing	▼9.5%
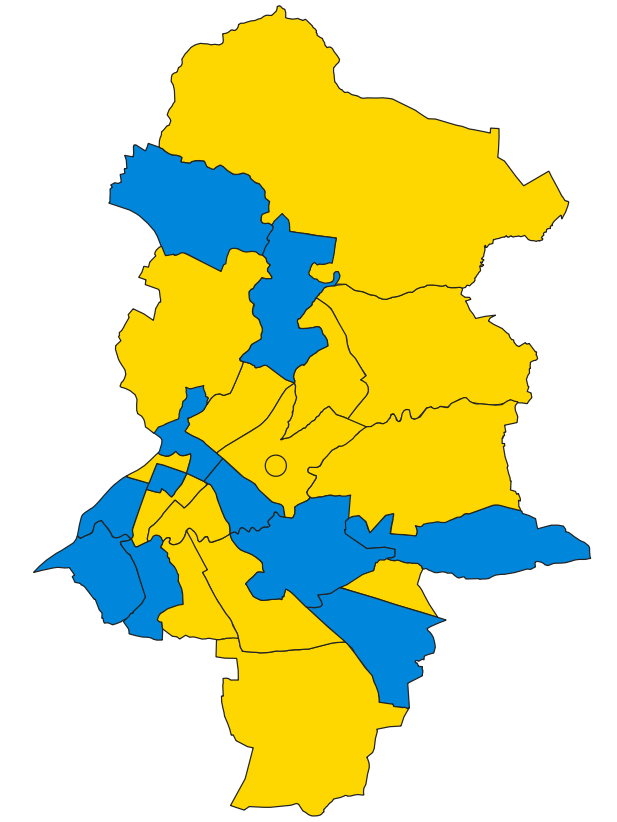
- Map of results of 1895 election
Leader of the Council before election
No overall control
Leader of the Council after election
No overall control

Elections to Manchester City Council were held on Friday, 1 November 1895. One third of the councillors seats were up for election, with each successful candidate to serve a three-year term of office. The council remained under no overall control.

== Election result ==
Party	Votes		Seats			Full Council	
Liberal Party	15,075 (40.8%)	▲7.5	15 (57.8%)	15 / 26	▼1	49 (47.1%)	49 / 104
Conservative Party	16,823 (45.5%)	▲5.4	11 (42.3%)	11 / 26	▲1	46 (44.2%)	46 / 104
Liberal Unionist	0 (0.0%)	▼6.6	0 (0.0%)	0 / 26	Steady	7 (6.7%)	7 / 104
Ind. Labour Party	3,824 (10.3%)	▼9.5	0 (0.0%)	0 / 26	Steady	2 (1.9%)	2 / 104
Social Democratic Federation	519 (1.4%)	N/A	0 (0.0%)	0 / 26	N/A	0 (0.0%)	0 / 104
Independent Liberal	509 (1.4%)	▲1.2	0 (0.0%)	0 / 26	Steady	0 (0.0%)	0 / 104
Independent Conservative	199 (0.5%)	N/A	0 (0.0%)	0 / 26	N/A	0 (0.0%)	0 / 104

=== Full council ===
↓
2	49	7	46

=== Aldermen ===
↓
15	5	6

=== Councillors ===
↓
2	34	2	40

== Ward results ==
=== All Saints' ===
All Saints'
Party	Candidate	Votes	%	±%
Liberal	M. Arrandale*	1,031	51.3	N/A
Conservative	A. Fulton	977	48.7	−11.6
Majority		54	2.6	
Turnout		2,008		
Liberal hold		Swing		

=== Ardwick ===
Ardwick
Party	Candidate	Votes	%	±%
Conservative	R. C. Smith*	uncontested		
Conservative hold		Swing		

=== Blackley and Moston ===
Blackley and Moston
Party	Candidate	Votes	%	±%
Liberal	J. Ward*	1,022	56.6	N/A
Conservative	T. Nesbitt	784	43.4	N/A
Majority		238	13.2	N/A
Turnout		1,806		
Liberal hold		Swing		

=== Bradford ===
Bradford
Party	Candidate	Votes	%	±%
Liberal	J. Hutt*	2,304	64.2	N/A
Ind. Labour Party	M. Atherton	771	21.5	−32.9
Conservative	J. Russell	515	14.3	−41.3
Majority		1,533	42.7	
Turnout		3,590		
Liberal hold		Swing		

=== Cheetham ===
Cheetham
Party	Candidate	Votes	%	±%
Liberal	J. E. Phythian*	uncontested		
Liberal hold		Swing		

=== Collegiate Church ===
Collegiate Church
Party	Candidate	Votes	%	±%
Conservative	J. Bradshaw*	uncontested		
Conservative hold		Swing		

=== Crumpsall ===
Crumpsall
Party	Candidate	Votes	%	±%
Conservative	W. F. Dearden	uncontested		
Conservative hold		Swing		

=== Exchange ===
Exchange
Party	Candidate	Votes	%	±%
Liberal	J. G. Batty*	358	51.6	+0.9
Conservative	R. Cooper	336	48.4	−0.9
Majority		22	3.2	+1.8
Turnout		694		
Liberal hold		Swing		

=== Harpurhey ===
Harpurhey
Party	Candidate	Votes	%	±%
Conservative	J. Richards*	2,194	62.3	+7.5
Ind. Labour Party	J. Harker	1,326	37.7	+16.1
Majority		868	24.6	−6.6
Turnout		3,520		
Conservative hold		Swing		

=== Longsight ===
Longsight
Party	Candidate	Votes	%	±%
Conservative	J. R. Wilson*	867	52.5	+3.2
Ind. Labour Party	N. Lingard	784	47.5	N/A
Majority		83	5.0	
Turnout		1,651		
Conservative hold		Swing		

=== Medlock Street ===
Medlock Street
Party	Candidate	Votes	%	±%
Conservative	H. H. Mainwaring*	1,808	77.0	N/A
Ind. Labour Party	F. Lawler	541	23.0	−12.0
Majority		1,267	54.0	
Turnout		2,349		
Conservative hold		Swing		

=== Miles Platting ===
Miles Platting
Party	Candidate	Votes	%	±%
Liberal	J. Bowes*	995	47.0	+24.6
Conservative	T. Milnes	882	41.7	−8.0
Ind. Labour Party	T. Cook	238	11.3	−16.6
Majority		113	5.3	
Turnout		2,115		
Liberal hold		Swing		

=== New Cross ===
New Cross
Party	Candidate	Votes	%	±%
Liberal	W. Birkbeck*	2,086	60.2	+20.9
Liberal	R. Lloyd*	1,909	55.1	+15.2
Conservative	N. Meadowcroft	1,530	44.2	+5.7
Conservative	J. Barratt	1,402	40.5	+2.0
Majority		379	10.9	+10.6
Turnout		3,464		
Liberal hold		Swing		
Liberal hold		Swing		

=== Newton Heath ===
Newton Heath
Party	Candidate	Votes	%	±%
Liberal	W. Trevor*	uncontested		
Liberal hold		Swing		

=== Openshaw ===
Openshaw
Party	Candidate	Votes	%	±%
Conservative	D. Taylor*	1,526	50.6	+1.0
Liberal	J. Jee	786	26.1	N/A
Ind. Labour Party	E. J. Hart	705	23.4	−27.0
Majority		740	24.5	
Turnout		3,017		
Conservative hold		Swing		

=== Oxford ===
Oxford
Party	Candidate	Votes	%	±%
Liberal	J. H. Greenhow*	uncontested		
Liberal hold		Swing		

=== Rusholme ===
Rusholme
Party	Candidate	Votes	%	±%
Liberal	H. Plummer*	uncontested		
Liberal hold		Swing		

=== St. Ann's ===
St. Ann's
Party	Candidate	Votes	%	±%
Conservative	J. Fildes*	uncontested		
Conservative hold		Swing		

=== St. Clement's ===
St. Clement's
Party	Candidate	Votes	%	±%
Conservative	T. Hassall	666	50.6	N/A
Liberal	G. D. Kelley*	650	49.4	N/A
Majority		16	1.2	N/A
Turnout		1,316		
Conservative gain from Liberal		Swing		

=== St. George's ===
St. George's
Party	Candidate	Votes	%	±%
Conservative	J. C. Nichol*	1,579	75.3	+24.7
Social Democratic Federation	W. Skivington	519	24.7	N/A
Majority		1,060	50.6	+32.3
Turnout		2,098		
Conservative hold		Swing		

=== St. James' ===
St. James'
Party	Candidate	Votes	%	±%
Liberal	H. J. Goldschmidt*	uncontested		
Liberal hold		Swing		

=== St. John's ===
St. John's
Party	Candidate	Votes	%	±%
Conservative	H. Shuttleworth*	434	47.7	+7.1
Liberal	J. Ashworth	277	30.4	−19.3
Ind. Conservative	S. Barnett	199	21.9	N/A
Majority		157	17.3	
Turnout		910		
Conservative hold		Swing		

=== St. Luke's ===
St. Luke's
Party	Candidate	Votes	%	±%
Liberal	C. O'Doherty	1,828	58.0	N/A
Conservative	J. Grime	1,323	42.0	N/A
Majority		505	16.0	
Turnout		3,151		
Liberal hold		Swing		

=== St. Mark's ===
St. Mark's
Party	Candidate	Votes	%	±%
Liberal	S. H. Brooks*	uncontested		
Liberal hold		Swing		

=== St. Michael's ===
St. Michael's
Party	Candidate	Votes	%	±%
Liberal	D. McCabe*	1,829	78.2	+58.8
Independent Liberal	W. Brown	509	21.8	+18.7
Majority		1,320	56.4	
Turnout		2,338		
Liberal hold		Swing		

== Aldermanic elections ==
=== Aldermanic election, 9 November 1895 ===
At the meeting of the council on 9 November 1895, the terms of office of thirteen aldermen expired.

The following thirteen were elected as aldermen by the council on 9 November 1895 for a term of six years.

Party	Alderman	Ward	Term expires
Conservative	Samuel Ashcroft*		1901
Liberal Unionist	George Clay*		1901
Liberal	Robert Gibson*		1901
Conservative	John Grantham*		1901
Liberal Unionist	John Hopkinson*		1901
Liberal Unionist	John King*		1901
Liberal	Sir Bosdin Leech*		1901
Liberal Unionist	John Mark*		1901
Liberal	Alexander McDougall		1901
Liberal Unionist	Harry Rawson*		1901
Conservative	Richard Lovatt Reade*		1901
Liberal	G. T. Stanley*	Blackley & Moston	1901
Liberal	Joseph Thompson*	Ardwick	1901

== By-elections between 1895 and 1896 ==
=== All Saints', 22 November 1895 ===
Caused by the election as an alderman of Councillor Alexander McDougall (Liberal, All Saints', elected 1 November 1884) on 9 November 1895 following the resignation on 9 November 1895 of Alderman Hugo Shaw (Conservative, elected as an alderman by the council on 9 November 1885).

All Saints'
Party	Candidate	Votes	%	±%
Liberal	W. B. Pritchard	968	53.4	+2.1
Conservative	G. Simpson	846	46.6	−2.1
Majority		122	6.8	+4.2
Turnout		1,814		
Liberal hold		Swing		
