= 1970 Manchester City Council election =

UK local government election

- 7 May 1970

39 of 152 seats to Manchester City Council 77 seats needed for a majority
| | First party | Second party |
|---|---|---|
| Party | Conservative | Labour |
| Last election | 24 seats, 57.8% | 15 seats, 35.5% |
| Seats before | 97 | 55 |
| Seats won | 17 | 22 |
| Seats after | 86 | 66 |
| Seat change | ▼11 | ▲11 |
| Popular vote | 64,782 | 63,187 |
| Percentage | 47.4% | 46.2% |
| Swing | ▼10.5% | ▲10.7% |
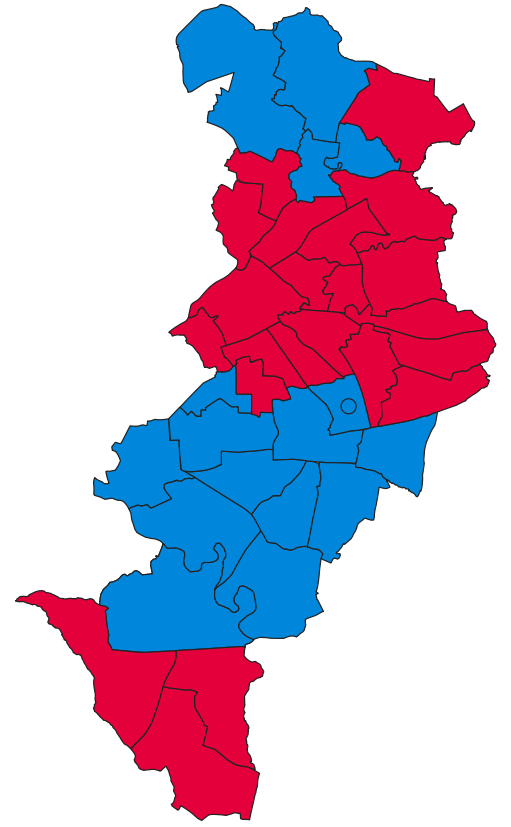
- Map of results of 1970 election
Leader of the Council before election
Conservative
Leader of the Council after election
Conservative

Elections to Manchester City Council were held on Thursday, 7 May 1970. One third of the councillors seats were up for election, with each successful candidate to serve a three-year term of office. The Conservative Party retained overall control of the council.

== Election result ==
| Party | Votes | | Seats | | | Full Council | |
| Conservative Party | 64,782 (47.4%) | ▼10.4 | 17 (43.6%) | 17 / 39 | ▼11 | 86 (56.6%) | 86 / 152 |
| Labour Party | 63,187 (46.2%) | ▲10.7 | 22 (56.4%) | 22 / 39 | ▲11 | 66 (43.4%) | 66 / 152 |
| Liberal Party | 6,758 (4.9%) | ▼0.9 | 0 (0.0%) | 0 / 39 | Steady | 0 (0.0%) | 0 / 152 |
| Residents | 1,324 (1.0%) | ▲1.0 | 0 (0.0%) | 0 / 39 | Steady | 0 (0.0%) | 0 / 152 |
| Communist | 513 (0.4%) | ▼0.3 | 0 (0.0%) | 0 / 39 | Steady | 0 (0.0%) | 0 / 152 |
| Union Movement | 180 (0.1%) | ▼0.1 | 0 (0.0%) | 0 / 39 | Steady | 0 (0.0%) | 0 / 152 |

=== Full council ===
↓
| 66 | 86 |

=== Aldermen ===
↓
| 19 | 19 |

=== Councillors ===
↓
| 47 | 67 |

== Ward results ==
=== Alexandra Park ===
Alexandra Park
| Party | Candidate | Votes | % | ±% |
|---|---|---|---|---|
| Conservative | M. Flynn* | 3,059 | 57.7 | −11.6 |
| Liberal | E. O. Tomlinson | 1,255 | 23.7 | +0.8 |
| Labour | K. McKeon | 954 | 18.0 | +8.3 |
| Residents | G. Edwards | 38 | 0.6 | N/A |
| Majority | | 1,804 | 34.0 | −11.4 |
| Turnout | | 5,306 | | |
| Conservative hold | | Swing | | |

=== All Saints' ===
All Saints'
| Party | Candidate | Votes | % | ±% |
|---|---|---|---|---|
| Labour | T. Thomas* | 1,044 | 70.9 | +10.1 |
| Conservative | F. P. Heenan | 418 | 28.4 | −10.8 |
| Residents | E. T. Beach | 11 | 0.7 | N/A |
| Majority | | 626 | 42.5 | +20.9 |
| Turnout | | 1,473 | | |
| Labour hold | | Swing | | |

=== Ardwick ===
Ardwick
| Party | Candidate | Votes | % | ±% |
|---|---|---|---|---|
| Labour | A. S. Goldstone | 914 | 65.1 | +13.2 |
| Conservative | D. Taylor* | 491 | 34.9 | −13.2 |
| Majority | | 423 | 30.2 | +26.4 |
| Turnout | | 1,405 | | |
| Labour gain from Conservative | | Swing | | |

=== Baguley ===
Baguley
| Party | Candidate | Votes | % | ±% |
|---|---|---|---|---|
| Labour | F. H. Price | 3,494 | 54.0 | +9.5 |
| Conservative | T. E. Murphy* | 2,981 | 46.0 | −9.5 |
| Majority | | 513 | 8.0 | |
| Turnout | | 6,475 | | |
| Labour gain from Conservative | | Swing | | |

=== Barlow Moor ===
Barlow Moor
| Party | Candidate | Votes | % | ±% |
|---|---|---|---|---|
| Conservative | C. M. Pugh* | 1,645 | 47.2 | −12.4 |
| Labour | W. A. Moody | 988 | 28.4 | +10.9 |
| Liberal | D. V. Jameson | 834 | 23.9 | +1.0 |
| Residents | J. Stretton | 17 | 0.5 | N/A |
| Majority | | 657 | 18.8 | −17.9 |
| Turnout | | 3,484 | | |
| Conservative hold | | Swing | | |

=== Benchill ===
Benchill
| Party | Candidate | Votes | % | ±% |
|---|---|---|---|---|
| Labour | R. L. Griffiths | 3,188 | 53.0 | +15.0 |
| Conservative | Y. I. Emery | 2,716 | 45.2 | −14.4 |
| Communist | M. Taylor | 107 | 1.8 | −0.6 |
| Majority | | 472 | 7.9 | |
| Turnout | | 6,011 | | |
| Labour gain from Conservative | | Swing | | |

=== Beswick ===
Beswick
| Party | Candidate | Votes | % | ±% |
|---|---|---|---|---|
| Labour | J. Dean* | 1,223 | 75.3 | +7.8 |
| Conservative | E. M. Bevan | 402 | 24.7 | −7.8 |
| Majority | | 821 | 50.6 | +15.6 |
| Turnout | | 1,625 | | |
| Labour hold | | Swing | | |

=== Blackley ===
Blackley
| Party | Candidate | Votes | % | ±% |
|---|---|---|---|---|
| Conservative | W. Burrows* | 2,073 | 46.8 | −15.6 |
| Labour | D. Cox | 1,836 | 41.5 | +22.8 |
| Liberal | J. M. Ashley | 520 | 11.7 | −5.8 |
| Majority | | 237 | 5.3 | −38.4 |
| Turnout | | 4,429 | | |
| Conservative hold | | Swing | | |

=== Bradford ===
Bradford
| Party | Candidate | Votes | % | ±% |
|---|---|---|---|---|
| Labour | R. Massey* | 1,821 | 60.6 | +0.9 |
| Conservative | H. Horton | 1,131 | 37.6 | −2.7 |
| Communist | P. Maher | 43 | 1.4 | N/A |
| Residents | J. Gidley | 10 | 0.3 | N/A |
| Majority | | 690 | 23.0 | +3.6 |
| Turnout | | 3,005 | | |
| Labour hold | | Swing | | |

=== Burnage ===
Burnage
| Party | Candidate | Votes | % | ±% |
|---|---|---|---|---|
| Conservative | L. Howarth | 3,026 | 59.8 | −1.4 |
| Labour | S. H. Higgins | 2,038 | 40.2 | +16.5 |
| Majority | | 988 | 19.6 | −17.9 |
| Turnout | | 5,064 | | |
| Conservative hold | | Swing | | |

=== Cheetham ===
Cheetham
| Party | Candidate | Votes | % | ±% |
|---|---|---|---|---|
| Labour | D. G. Ford | 1,068 | 51.3 | +8.2 |
| Conservative | F. E. Meaden* | 919 | 44.1 | −7.6 |
| Communist | H. Ogden | 62 | 3.0 | −2.2 |
| Residents | I. Mackin | 33 | 1.6 | N/A |
| Majority | | 149 | 7.2 | |
| Turnout | | 2,082 | | |
| Labour gain from Conservative | | Swing | | |

=== Chorlton-cum-Hardy ===
Chorlton-cum-Hardy
| Party | Candidate | Votes | % | ±% |
|---|---|---|---|---|
| Conservative | L. Sanders* | 3,497 | 75.5 | −7.5 |
| Labour | B. S. Jeuda | 1,057 | 22.8 | +5.8 |
| Residents | S. Nwagbara | 76 | 1.7 | N/A |
| Majority | | 2,440 | 52.7 | −13.3 |
| Turnout | | 4,630 | | |
| Conservative hold | | Swing | | |

=== Collegiate Church ===
Collegiate Church
| Party | Candidate | Votes | % | ±% |
|---|---|---|---|---|
| Labour | J. Davis* | 390 | 73.0 | +6.1 |
| Conservative | E. A. M. Walmsley | 132 | 24.7 | −2.5 |
| Residents | L. H. F. Roberts | 12 | 2.3 | N/A |
| Majority | | 258 | 48.3 | +8.6 |
| Turnout | | 534 | | |
| Labour hold | | Swing | | |

=== Crumpsall ===
Crumpsall
| Party | Candidate | Votes | % | ±% |
|---|---|---|---|---|
| Conservative | A. S. Daulby | 3,223 | 52.7 | −14.9 |
| Labour | J. E. Jackson | 2,833 | 46.4 | +14.0 |
| Residents | B. Campbell | 56 | 0.9 | N/A |
| Majority | | 390 | 6.3 | −28.9 |
| Turnout | | 6,112 | | |
| Conservative hold | | Swing | | |

=== Didsbury ===
Didsbury
| Party | Candidate | Votes | % | ±% |
|---|---|---|---|---|
| Conservative | M. R. Crawford* | 3,655 | 66.4 | −5.1 |
| Labour | R. W. Ford | 1,165 | 21.2 | +9.5 |
| Liberal | J. R. Clements | 681 | 12.4 | −4.4 |
| Majority | | 2,490 | 45.2 | −9.5 |
| Turnout | | 5,501 | | |
| Conservative hold | | Swing | | |

=== Gorton North ===
Gorton North
| Party | Candidate | Votes | % | ±% |
|---|---|---|---|---|
| Labour | G. Conquest | 3,082 | 65.1 | +8.3 |
| Conservative | H. Griffiths | 1,653 | 34.9 | −8.3 |
| Majority | | 1,429 | 30.2 | +16.6 |
| Turnout | | 4,745 | | |
| Labour hold | | Swing | | |

=== Gorton South ===
Gorton South
| Party | Candidate | Votes | % | ±% |
|---|---|---|---|---|
| Labour | D. Barker | 2,333 | 57.5 | +8.3 |
| Conservative | D. E. Lindsey* | 1,727 | 42.5 | −8.3 |
| Majority | | 606 | 15.0 | |
| Turnout | | 4,060 | | |
| Labour gain from Conservative | | Swing | | |

=== Harpurhey ===
Harpurhey
| Party | Candidate | Votes | % | ±% |
|---|---|---|---|---|
| Conservative | J. Holden | 962 | 45.3 | −13.2 |
| Labour | S. N. M. Moxley | 952 | 44.8 | +3.3 |
| Liberal | R. Jackson | 195 | 9.2 | N/A |
| Residents | L. George | 15 | 0.7 | N/A |
| Majority | | 10 | 0.5 | −16.5 |
| Turnout | | 2,124 | | |
| Conservative hold | | Swing | | |

=== Hugh Oldham ===
Hugh Oldham
| Party | Candidate | Votes | % | ±% |
|---|---|---|---|---|
| Labour | A. Nicholson* | 897 | 77.5 | +22.0 |
| Conservative | D. A. Harding | 171 | 14.8 | −8.1 |
| Liberal | J. H. Colclough | 90 | 7.7 | −13.9 |
| Majority | | 726 | 62.7 | +30.1 |
| Turnout | | 1,158 | | |
| Labour hold | | Swing | | |

=== Levenshulme ===
Levenshulme
| Party | Candidate | Votes | % | ±% |
|---|---|---|---|---|
| Conservative | A. Williamson* | 2,251 | 64.7 | −11.8 |
| Labour | A. E. Jones | 1,170 | 44.6 | +10.1 |
| Residents | F. F. Kienzler | 56 | 1.7 | N/A |
| Majority | | 1,081 | 31.1 | −21.9 |
| Turnout | | 3,477 | | |
| Conservative hold | | Swing | | |

=== Lightbowne ===
Lightbowne
| Party | Candidate | Votes | % | ±% |
|---|---|---|---|---|
| Conservative | N. A. Green* | 2,116 | 43.9 | −2.2 |
| Labour | W. Lister | 2,013 | 41.8 | +11.3 |
| Liberal | G. H. Wilkinson | 665 | 13.8 | −8.0 |
| Residents | T. Tennyson-Smith | 23 | 0.5 | N/A |
| Majority | | 103 | 2.1 | −13.5 |
| Turnout | | 4,817 | | |
| Conservative hold | | Swing | | |

=== Longsight ===
Longsight (2 vacancies)
| Party | Candidate | Votes | % | ±% |
|---|---|---|---|---|
| Conservative | A. B. Deacy* | 1,632 | 54.4 | −23.1 |
| Conservative | F. Coombs | 1,515 | 50.5 | −27.0 |
| Labour | H. Graham | 1,256 | 41.9 | +28.2 |
| Labour | R. A. Reddington | 1,133 | 37.8 | +24.1 |
| Union Movement | G. S. Gee | 97 | 3.2 | −1.4 |
| Communist | H. Johnson | 96 | 3.2 | −1.1 |
| Residents | B. Palmer | 38 | 1.3 | N/A |
| Majority | | 259 | 8.6 | −55.2 |
| Turnout | | 3,000 | | |
| Conservative hold | | Swing | | |
| Conservative hold | | Swing | | |

=== Miles Platting ===
Miles Platting
| Party | Candidate | Votes | % | ±% |
|---|---|---|---|---|
| Labour | D. Healey | 1,455 | 63.2 | −0.1 |
| Conservative | G. Fildes* | 829 | 36.0 | −0.7 |
| Residents | G. McKenzie-Jones | 18 | 0.8 | N/A |
| Majority | | 626 | 27.2 | +0.6 |
| Turnout | | 2,302 | | |
| Labour gain from Conservative | | Swing | | |

=== Moss Side East ===
Moss Side East
| Party | Candidate | Votes | % | ±% |
|---|---|---|---|---|
| Labour | H. P. D. Paget | 1,587 | 55.9 | +15.6 |
| Conservative | S. Mottram* | 1,221 | 43.0 | −16.7 |
| Residents | C. N. Henry | 33 | 1.1 | N/A |
| Majority | | 366 | 12.9 | |
| Turnout | | 2,841 | | |
| Labour gain from Conservative | | Swing | | |

=== Moss Side West ===
Moss Side West
| Party | Candidate | Votes | % | ±% |
|---|---|---|---|---|
| Conservative | J. Pollitt* | 1,477 | 45.3 | −30.1 |
| Labour | G. Honeyman | 958 | 29.4 | +9.7 |
| Residents | C. Duncan | 767 | 23.5 | N/A |
| Communist | W. Woolery | 45 | 1.4 | −3.4 |
| Residents | R. Davies | 16 | 0.5 | N/A |
| Majority | | 519 | 15.9 | −39.8 |
| Turnout | | 3,263 | | |
| Conservative hold | | Swing | | |

=== Moston ===
Moston
| Party | Candidate | Votes | % | ±% |
|---|---|---|---|---|
| Labour | A. E. Bowden | 2,451 | 37.9 | +6.1 |
| Conservative | T. W. R. Bamford* | 2,431 | 43.7 | −21.9 |
| Liberal | J. Lindsay | 607 | 10.9 | N/A |
| Communist | R. Cole | 69 | 1.2 | N/A |
| Residents | G. Nicholls | 8 | 0.1 | N/A |
| Majority | | 20 | 0.3 | |
| Turnout | | 5,566 | | |
| Labour gain from Conservative | | Swing | | |

=== New Cross ===
New Cross
| Party | Candidate | Votes | % | ±% |
|---|---|---|---|---|
| Labour | R. Latham* | 1,325 | 76.8 | +10.6 |
| Conservative | R. E. Pysden | 400 | 23.2 | −10.6 |
| Majority | | 925 | 53.6 | +21.2 |
| Turnout | | 1,725 | | |
| Labour hold | | Swing | | |

=== Newton Heath ===
Newton Heath
| Party | Candidate | Votes | % | ±% |
|---|---|---|---|---|
| Labour | M. J. Taylor | 2,220 | 60.4 | +7.3 |
| Conservative | K. E. Goulding* | 1,413 | 38.4 | −5.9 |
| Communist | R. Fisher | 44 | 1.2 | −1.4 |
| Majority | | 807 | 22.0 | +13.2 |
| Turnout | | 3,677 | | |
| Labour gain from Conservative | | Swing | | |

=== Northenden ===
Northenden
| Party | Candidate | Votes | % | ±% |
|---|---|---|---|---|
| Conservative | G. Leigh* | 3,657 | 54.1 | −13.5 |
| Labour | H. Brown | 2,712 | 40.2 | +7.8 |
| Liberal | S. Rose | 385 | 5.7 | N/A |
| Majority | | 945 | 13.9 | −21.4 |
| Turnout | | 6,754 | | |
| Conservative hold | | Swing | | |

=== Old Moat ===
Old Moat
| Party | Candidate | Votes | % | ±% |
|---|---|---|---|---|
| Conservative | T. F. Lavin | 2,326 | 58.5 | −15.9 |
| Labour | A. Roberts | 1,651 | 41.5 | +15.9 |
| Majority | | 675 | 17.0 | −31.8 |
| Turnout | | 3,977 | | |
| Conservative hold | | Swing | | |

=== Openshaw ===
Openshaw
| Party | Candidate | Votes | % | ±% |
|---|---|---|---|---|
| Labour | E. Grant* | 2,110 | 64.9 | +10.5 |
| Conservative | D. S. Knox-Crichton | 1,093 | 33.6 | −12.0 |
| Communist | K. M. Baylis | 47 | 1.5 | N/A |
| Majority | | 1,017 | 31.3 | +22.5 |
| Turnout | | 3,250 | | |
| Labour hold | | Swing | | |

=== Rusholme ===
Rusholme
| Party | Candidate | Votes | % | ±% |
|---|---|---|---|---|
| Conservative | S. R. Tucker | 2,074 | 60.8 | −7.5 |
| Labour | J. Smith | 942 | 27.6 | +15.6 |
| Liberal | S. Lowe | 380 | 11.2 | −8.5 |
| Residents | D. Barnes | 14 | 0.4 | N/A |
| Majority | | 1,132 | 33.2 | −15.4 |
| Turnout | | 3,410 | | |
| Conservative hold | | Swing | | |

=== St. George's ===
St. George's
| Party | Candidate | Votes | % | ±% |
|---|---|---|---|---|
| Labour | E. Mellor* | 694 | 72.7 | +14.0 |
| Conservative | J. H. Wood | 169 | 17.7 | −23.6 |
| Liberal | A. G. Lishman | 83 | 8.7 | N/A |
| Residents | J. Carty | 9 | 0.9 | N/A |
| Majority | | 525 | 55.0 | +37.6 |
| Turnout | | 955 | | |
| Labour hold | | Swing | | |

=== St. Luke's ===
St. Luke's
| Party | Candidate | Votes | % | ±% |
|---|---|---|---|---|
| Labour | W. Egerton | 750 | 60.6 | +6.9 |
| Conservative | M. Pierce* | 461 | 37.2 | −9.1 |
| Residents | P. Cuniffe | 15 | 1.2 | N/A |
| Residents | G. Nevins | 12 | 1.0 | N/A |
| Majority | | 289 | 23.4 | +16.0 |
| Turnout | | 1,238 | | |
| Labour gain from Conservative | | Swing | | |

=== St. Mark's ===
St. Mark's
| Party | Candidate | Votes | % | ±% |
|---|---|---|---|---|
| Labour | W. Shaw* | 1,856 | 58.5 | +11.0 |
| Conservative | R. E. Doweck | 1,211 | 38.2 | −7.6 |
| Union Movement | D. S. Lawson | 83 | 2.6 | −2.1 |
| Residents | A. W. King | 20 | 0.7 | −1.3 |
| Majority | | 645 | 20.3 | +18.6 |
| Turnout | | 3,170 | | |
| Labour hold | | Swing | | |

=== St. Peter's ===
St. Peter's
| Party | Candidate | Votes | % | ±% |
|---|---|---|---|---|
| Labour | F. J. Balcombe* | 608 | 62.7 | +40.7 |
| Conservative | J. R. Cawley | 305 | 31.5 | −46.5 |
| Liberal | I. Garrard | 51 | 5.3 | N/A |
| Residents | L. Robertson | 5 | 0.5 | N/A |
| Majority | | 303 | 31.2 | |
| Turnout | | 969 | | |
| Labour gain from Conservative | | Swing | | |

=== Withington ===
Withington
| Party | Candidate | Votes | % | ±% |
|---|---|---|---|---|
| Conservative | W. Crabtree* | 2,209 | 51.5 | −7.9 |
| Labour | G. Hall | 1,048 | 24.4 | +12.4 |
| Liberal | G. Fawdrey | 1,012 | 23.6 | −5.0 |
| Residents | W. Paton | 22 | 0.5 | N/A |
| Majority | | 1,161 | 27.1 | −3.8 |
| Turnout | | 4,291 | | |
| Conservative hold | | Swing | | |

=== Woodhouse Park ===
Woodhouse Park
| Party | Candidate | Votes | % | ±% |
|---|---|---|---|---|
| Labour | W. Smith* | 4,071 | 65.9 | +12.2 |
| Conservative | G. Parry | 2,111 | 34.1 | −9.1 |
| Majority | | 1,960 | 31.8 | +21.3 |
| Turnout | | 6,182 | | |
| Labour hold | | Swing | | |

== Aldermanic election ==
=== Aldermanic election, 20 May 1970 ===
At the meeting of the council on 20 May 1970, the terms of office of nineteen aldermen expired.

The following nineteen were elected as aldermen by the council on 20 May 1970 for a term of six years.

| Party | Alderman | Ward | Term expires |
|---|---|---|---|
| Conservative | Harold Bentley* | Collegiate Church | 1976 |
| Conservative | Patrick Buckley* | Gorton North | 1976 |
| Conservative | Joseph Carson | Baguley | 1976 |
| Conservative | F. J. Dunn* | Burnage | 1976 |
| Conservative | Douglas Edwards* | St. Luke's | 1976 |
| Conservative | Sir R. S. Harper* | Alexandra Park | 1976 |
| Conservative | Dorothy Lee* | St. Mark's | 1976 |
| Labour | Leslie Lever M.P.* | Woodhouse Park | 1976 |
| Labour | Alfred Logan* | Moston | 1976 |
| Labour | Robert Malcolm* | Miles Platting | 1976 |
| Labour | William Murray* | Old Moat | 1976 |
| Conservative | Kathleen Ollerenshaw | Longsight | 1976 |
| Labour | Tom Regan* | Moss Side East | 1976 |
| Conservative | Robert Rodgers* | Barlow Moor | 1976 |
| Conservative | Harry Sharp* | Gorton South | 1976 |
| Labour | Lily Thomas* | Lightbowne | 1976 |
| Labour | Sir Bob Thomas* | Bradford | 1976 |
| Conservative | Neil Westbrook* | Openshaw | 1976 |
| Labour | Elizabeth Yarwood* | Hugh Oldham | 1976 |

=== Aldermanic elections, 7 April 1971 ===
Caused by the resignation on 23 March 1971 of Alderman Emily Beavan (Labour, elected as an alderman by the council on 26 May 1954).

In her place, Councillor William Burrows (Conservative, Blackley, elected 8 May 1958) was elected as an alderman by the council on 7 April 1971.

| Party | Alderman | Ward | Term expires |
|---|---|---|---|
| Conservative | William Burrows | Ardwick | 1973 |

Caused by the resignation on 7 April 1971 of Alderman C. E. P. Stott (Labour, elected as an alderman by the council on 2 December 1952).

In his place, Councillor Edward Grant (Labour, Openshaw, elected 27 February 1969; previously 1950-68) was elected as an alderman by the council on 7 April 1971.

| Party | Alderman | Ward | Term expires |
|---|---|---|---|
| Labour | Edward Grant | Chorlton-cum-Hardy | 1973 |

== By-elections between 1970 and 1971 ==
=== By-elections, 24 September 1970 ===
Two by-elections were held on 24 September 1970 to fill vacancies that were created by the appointment of aldermen on 20 May 1970.

==== Rusholme ====
Caused by the election as an alderman of Councillor Kathleen Ollerenshaw (Conservative, Rusholme, elected 10 May 1956) on 20 May 1970, following the resignation on 12 May 1970 of Alderman William Onions (Labour, elected as an alderman by the council on 30 July 1970).

Rusholme
| Party | Candidate | Votes | % | ±% |
|---|---|---|---|---|
| Conservative | M. Pierce | 1,531 | 60.4 | −0.4 |
| Labour | J. Smith | 1,002 | 39.6 | +12.0 |
| Majority | | 529 | 20.8 | −12.4 |
| Turnout | | 2,533 | | |
| Conservative hold | | Swing | | |

==== St. Peter's ====
Caused by the election as an alderman of Councillor Joseph Carson (Conservative, St. Peter's, elected 10 May 1956) on 20 May 1970, following the resignation on 12 May 1970 of Alderman William Chadwick (Labour, elected as an alderman by the council on 26 May 1954).

St. Peter's
| Party | Candidate | Votes | % | ±% |
|---|---|---|---|---|
| Labour | J. Jackson | 399 | 73.5 | +10.8 |
| Conservative | J. R. Cawley | 106 | 19.5 | −12.0 |
| Liberal | S. Lowe | 38 | 7.0 | +1.7 |
| Majority | | 293 | 54.0 | +22.8 |
| Turnout | | 543 | | |
| Labour gain from Conservative | | Swing | | |
