= 1932 Manchester City Council election =

Local election in Manchester

- 1 November 1932

36 of 144 seats on Manchester City Council 73 seats needed for a majority
	First party	Second party	Third party
Party	Conservative	Labour	Liberal
Last election	21 seats, 50.0%	7 seats, 38.4%	7 seats, 9.8%
Seats before	72	39	26
Seats won	11	15	9
Seats after	74	36	28
Seat change	▲2	▼3	▲2
Popular vote	44,645	62,271	16,257
Percentage	34.7%	48.4%	12.6%
Swing	▼15.3%	▲10.0%	▲2.8%
	Fourth party	Fifth party
Party	Ind. Labour Party	Independent
Last election	0 seats, 1.3%	0 seats, 0.0%
Seats before	4	3
Seats won	1	0
Seats after	3	3
Seat change	▼1	Steady
Popular vote	2,983	0
Percentage	2.3%	0.0%
Swing	▲1.0%	Steady
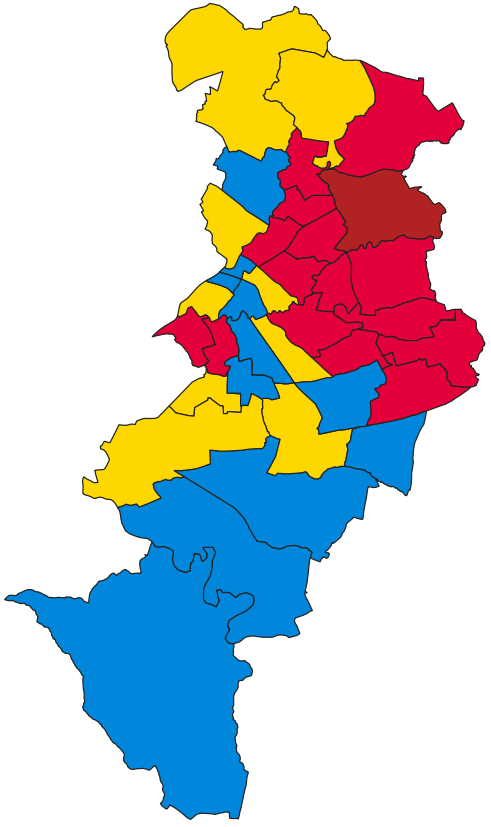
- Map of results of 1932 election
Leader of the Council before election
No overall control
Leader of the Council after election
Conservative

Elections to Manchester City Council were held on Tuesday, 1 November 1932. One third of the councillors seats were up for election, with each successful candidate to serve a three-year term of office. The Conservative Party gained overall control of the council from no overall control.

== Election result ==
Party	Votes		Seats			Full Council	
Conservative Party	44,645 (34.7%)	▼15.3	11 (30.6%)	11 / 36	▲2	74 (51.4%)	74 / 144
Labour Party	62,271 (48.4%)	▲10.0	15 (41.7%)	15 / 36	▼3	36 (25.0%)	36 / 144
Liberal Party	16,257 (12.6%)	▲2.8	9 (25.0%)	9 / 36	▲2	28 (19.4%)	28 / 144
Independent Labour Party	2,983 (2.3%)	▲1.0	1 (2.8%)	1 / 36	▼1	3 (2.1%)	3 / 144
Independent	0 (0.0%)	Steady	0 (0.0%)	0 / 36	Steady	3 (2.1%)	3 / 144
Independent Labour	1,093 (0.8%)	▼0.5	0 (0.0%)	0 / 36	Steady	0 (0.0%)	0 / 144
Communist	854 (0.7%)	▲0.5	0 (0.0%)	0 / 36	Steady	0 (0.0%)	0 / 144
Residents	527 (0.4%)	▲0.1	0 (0.0%)	0 / 36	Steady	0 (0.0%)	0 / 144

=== Full council ===
↓
3	36	28	3	74

== Ward results ==
=== All Saints' ===
All Saints'
Party	Candidate	Votes	%	±%
Conservative	R. S. Harper	1,598	53.6	+14.7
Labour	J. Williams*	1,383	46.4	+14.7
Majority		215	7.2	−29.4
Turnout		2,981		
Conservative gain from Labour		Swing		

=== Ardwick ===
Ardwick
Party	Candidate	Votes	%	±%
Labour	J. M. Wharton*	2,466	55.8	+17.8
Conservative	C. A. Baylem	1,955	44.2	−17.8
Majority		511	11.6	
Turnout		4,421		
Labour hold		Swing		

=== Beswick ===
Beswick
Party	Candidate	Votes	%	±%
Labour	W. Robinson*	4,258	68.0	+15.7
Conservative	R. C. Roberts	2,002	32.0	−15.7
Majority		2,256	36.0	+31.4
Turnout		6,260		
Labour hold		Swing		

=== Blackley ===
Blackley
Party	Candidate	Votes	%	±%
Liberal	T. S. Williams*	2,163	62.7	−11.7
Labour	W. Collingson	1,287	37.3	+11.7
Majority		876	25.4	−23.4
Turnout		3,450		
Liberal hold		Swing		

=== Bradford ===
Bradford
Party	Candidate	Votes	%	±%
Labour	E. J. Hart*	3,231	60.3	+19.3
Conservative	H. Poulter	1,987	37.1	−21.9
Communist	W. Dutson	137	2.6	N/A
Majority		1,244	23.2	
Turnout		5,355		
Labour hold		Swing		

=== Cheetham ===
Cheetham
Party	Candidate	Votes	%	±%
Conservative	H. Lomax*	1,928	48.4	N/A
Liberal	P. Smith	1,638	41.1	N/A
Labour	H. Goldstone	416	10.5	N/A
Majority		290	7.3	N/A
Turnout		3,982		
Conservative hold		Swing		

=== Chorlton-cum-Hardy ===
Chorlton-cum-Hardy
Party	Candidate	Votes	%	±%
Liberal	J. W. Maitland*	4,544	80.8	N/A
Labour	W. Taylor	1,080	19.2	N/A
Majority		3,464	61.6	N/A
Turnout		5,624		
Liberal hold		Swing		

=== Collegiate Church ===
Collegiate Church
Party	Candidate	Votes	%	±%
Liberal	A. S. Moss*	1,286	78.4	+28.6
Labour	H. Cohen	266	16.2	N/A
Communist	M. Jenkins	89	5.4	N/A
Majority		1,020	62.2	
Turnout		1,641		
Liberal hold		Swing		

=== Collyhurst ===
Collyhurst
Party	Candidate	Votes	%	±%
Labour	W. Johnston*	3,729	65.6	+18.6
Conservative	A. Heald	1,904	33.5	−17.7
Communist	J. Dunn	52	0.9	−0.9
Majority		1,825	32.1	
Turnout		5,685		
Labour hold		Swing		

=== Crumpsall ===
Crumpsall
Party	Candidate	Votes	%	±%
Liberal	S. Meadowcroft*	uncontested		
Liberal hold		Swing		

=== Didsbury ===
Didsbury
Party	Candidate	Votes	%	±%
Conservative	G. H. White*	uncontested		
Conservative hold		Swing		

=== Exchange ===
Exchange
Party	Candidate	Votes	%	±%
Conservative	A. S. Harper*	uncontested		
Conservative hold		Swing		

=== Gorton North ===
Gorton North
Party	Candidate	Votes	%	±%
Labour	S. H. Hitchbun*	4,017	72.1	+15.7
Liberal	H. Quinney	1,553	27.9	N/A
Majority		2,464	44.2	−31.4
Turnout		5,570		
Labour hold		Swing		

=== Gorton South ===
Gorton South
Party	Candidate	Votes	%	±%
Labour	T. H. Adams*	4,446	68.9	+17.0
Conservative	E. Appleton	2,005	31.1	−17.0
Majority		2,441	37.8	+34.0
Turnout		6,451		
Labour hold		Swing		

=== Harpurhey ===
Harpurhey
Party	Candidate	Votes	%	±%
Labour	J. Howard*	2,584	50.2	+14.6
Conservative	J. Chatterton	2,568	49.8	−14.6
Majority		16	0.4	
Turnout		5,152		
Labour hold		Swing		

=== Levenshulme ===
Levenshulme
Party	Candidate	Votes	%	±%
Conservative	H. M. Emery*	2,881	69.2	N/A
Labour	J. Moohan	1,280	30.8	N/A
Majority		1,601	38.4	N/A
Turnout		4,161		
Conservative hold		Swing		

=== Longsight ===
Longsight
Party	Candidate	Votes	%	±%
Conservative	W. P. Jackson*	2,498	69.6	N/A
Independent Labour	W. L. Wilson	1,093	30.4	N/A
Majority		1,405	39.2	N/A
Turnout		3,591		
Conservative hold		Swing		

=== Medlock Street ===
Medlock Street
Party	Candidate	Votes	%	±%
Labour	J. Gorman	2,132	49.7	+13.2
Conservative	C. A. Cave	1,941	45.2	−18.3
Communist	E. Billington	221	5.1	N/A
Majority		191	4.5	
Turnout		4,294		
Labour hold		Swing		

=== Miles Platting ===
Miles Platting
Party	Candidate	Votes	%	±%
Labour	A. James*	4,287	67.4	+20.5
Conservative	C. B. Walker	2,074	32.6	−20.5
Majority		2,213	34.8	
Turnout		6,361		
Labour hold		Swing		

=== Moss Side East ===
Moss Side East
Party	Candidate	Votes	%	±%
Conservative	G. Craven	1,500	54.8	−37.8
Labour	A. O'Donnell	1,130	41.3	N/A
Residents	A. R. Edwards	109	4.0	−3.4
Majority		370	13.5	−71.7
Turnout		2,739		
Conservative gain from Labour		Swing		

=== Moss Side West ===
Moss Side West
Party	Candidate	Votes	%	±%
Liberal	J. Mathewson Watson*	uncontested		
Liberal hold		Swing		

=== Moston ===
Moston
Party	Candidate	Votes	%	±%
Labour	F. Gregson*	2,981	54.1	+2.5
Conservative	W. P. Parker	2,532	45.9	−2.5
Majority		449	8.2	+5.0
Turnout		5,513		
Labour hold		Swing		

=== New Cross ===
New Cross
Party	Candidate	Votes	%	±%
Labour	W. Hallows*	3,986	63.3	+14.8
Conservative	H. Sumner	2,309	36.7	−14.8
Majority		1,677	26.6	
Turnout		6,295		
Labour hold		Swing		

=== Newton Heath ===
Newton Heath
Party	Candidate	Votes	%	±%
Ind. Labour Party	H. M. Mitchell*	2,983	60.3	N/A
Conservative	J. Fildes	1,960	39.7	−21.9
Majority		1,023	20.6	
Turnout		4,943		
Ind. Labour Party hold		Swing		

=== Openshaw ===
Openshaw
Party	Candidate	Votes	%	±%
Labour	W. H. Oldfield*	3,759	73.4	+19.2
Conservative	J. Campbell	1,186	23.2	−19.9
Communist	J. Parry	174	3.4	+0.7
Majority		2,573	50.2	+39.1
Turnout		5,119		
Labour hold		Swing		

=== Oxford ===
Oxford
Party	Candidate	Votes	%	±%
Conservative	R. W. Shepherd*	uncontested		
Conservative hold		Swing		

=== Rusholme ===
Rusholme
Party	Candidate	Votes	%	±%
Liberal	C. H. Barlow*	2,235	69.6	N/A
Labour	J. L. Stocks	933	29.1	N/A
Residents	A. M. Edwards	43	1.3	+3.3
Majority		1,302	40.5	
Turnout		3,211		
Liberal hold		Swing		

=== St. Ann's ===
St. Ann's
Party	Candidate	Votes	%	±%
Conservative	R. A. Larmuth*	uncontested		
Conservative hold		Swing		

=== St. Clement's ===
St. Clement's
Party	Candidate	Votes	%	±%
Liberal	J. E. Fitzsimons	1,049	52.8	N/A
Labour	A. E. Jones*	939	47.2	+5.2
Majority		110	5.6	
Turnout		1,988		
Liberal gain from Labour		Swing		

=== St. George's ===
St. George's
Party	Candidate	Votes	%	±%
Labour	J. G. Clapham*	2,144	54.4	+29.8
Conservative	A. E. Courtman	1,715	43.5	N/A
Communist	L. Evans	81	2.1	N/A
Majority		429	10.9	
Turnout		3,940		
Labour hold		Swing		

=== St. John's ===
St. John's
Party	Candidate	Votes	%	±%
Liberal	M. A. Gibbons*	uncontested		
Liberal hold		Swing		

=== St. Luke's ===
St. Luke's
Party	Candidate	Votes	%	±%
Liberal	F. Tebb	1,789	53.2	−25.2
Labour	J. T. Wolfenden	1,472	43.8	+22.2
Communist	J. Ball	100	3.0	N/A
Majority		317	9.4	
Turnout		3,361		
Liberal gain from Ind. Labour Party		Swing		

=== St. Mark's ===
St. Mark's
Party	Candidate	Votes	%	±%
Labour	C. Wood*	3,329	67.4	+16.8
Conservative	G. Moores	1,611	32.6	−16.8
Majority		1,718	34.8	+33.6
Turnout		4,940		
Labour hold		Swing		

=== St. Michael's ===
St. Michael's
Party	Candidate	Votes	%	±%
Labour	E. Rafferty*	2,366	68.9	+13.3
Conservative	T. Smith	1,067	31.1	−13.3
Majority		1,299	37.8	+26.6
Turnout		3,433		
Labour hold		Swing		

=== Withington ===
Withington
Party	Candidate	Votes	%	±%
Conservative	J. S. Hill*	5,424	66.4	N/A
Labour	F. Edwards	2,370	29.0	N/A
Residents	G. O. Edwards	375	4.6	N/A
Majority		3,054	37.4	N/A
Turnout		8,169		
Conservative hold		Swing		

=== Wythenshawe ===
Wythenshawe
Party	Candidate	Votes	%	±%
Conservative	H. Bentley*	uncontested		
Conservative hold		Swing		

== Aldermanic elections ==
=== Aldermanic election, 9 November 1932 ===
Caused by the death on 3 November 1932 of Alderman James Reilly (Labour, elected as an alderman by the council on 3 September 1930).

In his place, Councillor Sir William Cundiff (Conservative, Exchange, elected 14 May 1912) was elected as an alderman by the council on 9 November 1932.

Party	Alderman	Ward	Term expires
Conservative	William Cundiff	St. Michael's	1934

== By-elections between 1932 and 1933 ==
=== New Cross, 8 November 1932 ===
Caused by the death of Councillor Robert Matthews (Labour, New Cross, elected 1 November 1924) on 8 October 1932.

New Cross
Party	Candidate	Votes	%	±%
Labour	L. M. Lever	4,206	65.3	2.0
Conservative	H. Sumner	2,235	34.7	−2.0
Majority		1,971	30.6	+4.0
Turnout		6,441		
Labour hold		Swing		

=== Longsight, 20 December 1932 ===
Caused by the election as an alderman of Councillor Sir William Cundiff (Conservative, Exchange, elected 14 May 1912) on 9 November 1932, following the death on 3 November 1932 of Alderman James Reilly (Labour, elected as an alderman by the council on 3 September 1930).

Longsight
Party	Candidate	Votes	%	±%
Conservative	W. N. Griffin	1,782	67.1	−2.5
Labour	A. Lees	804	30.3	N/A
Residents	A. R. Edwards	68	2.6	N/A
Majority		978	36.8	−2.4
Turnout		2,654		
Conservative hold		Swing		

=== St. Mark's, 17 January 1933 ===
Caused by the death of Councillor Isaac Brassington (Labour, St. Mark's, elected 1 November 1921) on 13 December 1932.

St. Mark's
Party	Candidate	Votes	%	±%
Labour	T. M. Larrad	1,627	86.0	+18.6
Communist	A. Jackson	161	8.5	N/A
Residents	A. R. Edwards	104	5.5	N/A
Majority		1,466	77.5	+42.7
Turnout		1,892		
Labour hold		Swing		

=== Exchange, 28 February 1933 ===
Caused by the death of Councillor Gilbert Lees Hardcastle (Conservative, Exchange, elected 1 August 1917) on 10 February 1933.

Exchange
Party	Candidate	Votes	%	±%
Conservative	T. A. Higson	414	76.2	N/A
Independent	A. R. F. Onions	129	23.8	N/A
Majority		285	52.4	N/A
Turnout		543		
Conservative hold		Swing		

=== Oxford, 18 April 1933 ===
Caused by the disqualification of Councillor R. Noton Barclay (Liberal, Oxford, elected 31 October 1917) on 5 April 1933.

Oxford
Party	Candidate	Votes	%	±%
Liberal	R. Noton Barclay*	uncontested		
Liberal hold		Swing		

=== Crumpsall, 19 September 1933 ===
Caused by the death of Councillor William Reid (Conservative, Crumpsall, elected 2 November 1931) on 14 August 1933.

Crumpsall
Party	Candidate	Votes	%	±%
Conservative	F. Weaver	1,438	70.5	N/A
Labour	A. Sutcliffe	601	29.5	N/A
Majority		837	41.0	N/A
Turnout		2,039		
Conservative hold		Swing		

=== All Saints', 3 October 1933 ===
Caused by the death of Councillor Johnny McMahon (Conservative, All Saints', elected 2 November 1931) on 11 September 1933.

All Saints'
Party	Candidate	Votes	%	±%
Conservative	H. Shaw	1,041	51.4	−2.2
Labour	A. Lees	984	48.6	+2.2
Majority		57	2.8	−4.4
Turnout		2,025		
Conservative hold		Swing		
