= 1935 Manchester City Council election =

Local election in Manchester

- 1 November 1935

36 of 144 seats on Manchester City Council 73 seats needed for a majority
	First party	Second party	Third party
Party	Conservative	Labour	Liberal
Last election	14 seats, 38.7%	15 seats, 46.8%	6 seats, 9.3%
Seats before	60	51	29
Seats won	13	16	7
Seats after	62	52	27
Seat change	▲2	▲1	▼2
Popular vote	46,673	40,054	13,769
Percentage	46.1%	39.5%	13.6%
Swing	▲7.4%	▼7.3%	▲4.3%
	Fourth party
Party	Independent
Last election	0 seats, 2.2%
Seats before	2
Seats won	0
Seats after	2
Seat change	Steady
Popular vote	365
Percentage	0.4%
Swing	▼1.8%
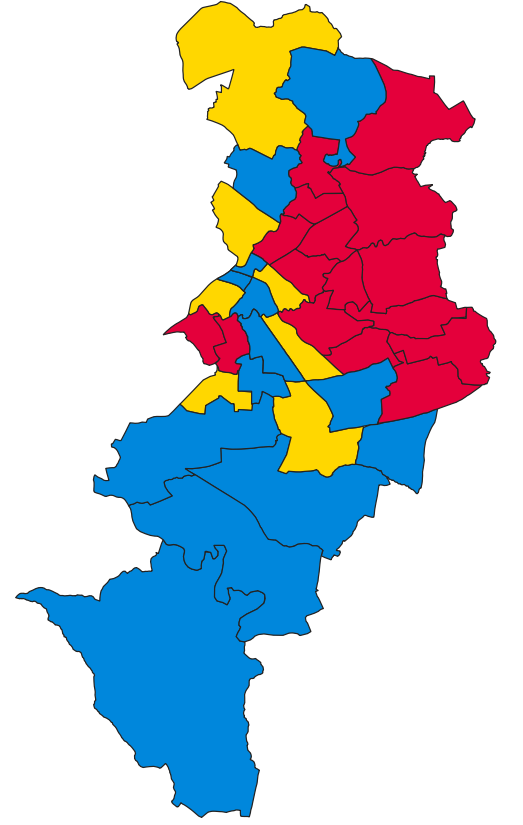
- Map of results of 1935 election
Leader of the Council before election
No overall control
Leader of the Council after election
No overall control

Elections to Manchester City Council were held on Friday, 1 November 1935. One third of the councillors seats were up for election, with each successful candidate to serve a three-year term of office. The council remained under no overall control.

== Election result ==
Party	Votes		Seats			Full Council	
Conservative Party	46,673 (46.1%)	▲7.4	13 (36.1%)	13 / 36	▲2	62 (43.1%)	62 / 144
Labour Party	40,054 (39.5%)	▼7.3	16 (44.4%)	16 / 36	▲1	52 (36.1%)	52 / 144
Liberal Party	13,769 (13.6%)	▲4.3	7 (19.4%)	7 / 36	▼2	27 (18.8%)	27 / 144
Independent	365 (0.4%)	▼1.8	0 (0.0%)	0 / 36	Steady	2 (1.4%)	2 / 144
Independent Labour	0 (0.0%)	▼2.4	0 (0.0%)	0 / 36	Steady	1 (0.7%)	1 / 144
Residents	472 (0.5%)	▲0.3	0 (0.0%)	0 / 36	Steady	0 (0.0%)	0 / 144

=== Full council ===
↓
1	52	27	2	62

=== Aldermen ===
↓
7	10	1	18

=== Councillors ===
↓
1	45	17	1	44

== Ward results ==
=== All Saints' ===
All Saints'
Party	Candidate	Votes	%	±%
Conservative	R. S. Harper*	1,819	55.7	+6.1
Labour	A. Titt	1,448	44.3	−6.1
Majority		371	11.4	
Turnout		3,267		
Conservative hold		Swing		

=== Ardwick ===
Ardwick
Party	Candidate	Votes	%	±%
Labour	J. M. Wharton*	2,285	56.2	+1.5
Conservative	G. Moores	1,782	43.8	−1.5
Majority		503	12.4	+3.0
Turnout		4,067		
Labour hold		Swing		

=== Beswick ===
Beswick
Party	Candidate	Votes	%	±%
Labour	W. Robinson*	uncontested		
Labour hold		Swing		

=== Blackley ===
Blackley
Party	Candidate	Votes	%	±%
Conservative	S. Fitton	2,564	50.4	N/A
Labour	H. Footit	1,611	31.7	−4.5
Liberal	W. S. Booth	908	17.9	−45.9
Majority		953	18.7	
Turnout		5,083		
Conservative gain from Liberal		Swing		

=== Bradford ===
Bradford
Party	Candidate	Votes	%	±%
Labour	E. J. Hart*	3,371	62.7	−1.8
Conservative	S. Bloor	2,006	37.3	+1.8
Majority		1,365	25.4	−3.6
Turnout		5,377		
Labour hold		Swing		

=== Cheetham ===
Cheetham
Party	Candidate	Votes	%	±%
Conservative	H. Lomax*	1,463	52.3	−18.9
Liberal	G. A. Barrow	1,333	47.7	N/A
Majority		130	4.6	−37.8
Turnout		2,796		
Conservative hold		Swing		

=== Chorlton-cum-Hardy ===
Chorlton-cum-Hardy
Party	Candidate	Votes	%	±%
Conservative	N. Beith	4,533	49.2	−24.2
Liberal	J. W. Maitland*	3,003	32.6	N/A
Labour	J. Cooper	1,686	18.2	−8.4
Majority		1,530	16.6	−30.2
Turnout		9,222		
Conservative gain from Liberal		Swing		

=== Collegiate Church ===
Collegiate Church
Party	Candidate	Votes	%	±%
Liberal	A. S. Moss*	uncontested		
Liberal hold		Swing		

=== Collyhurst ===
Collyhurst
Party	Candidate	Votes	%	±%
Labour	W. Johnston*	uncontested		
Labour hold		Swing		

=== Crumpsall ===
Crumpsall
Party	Candidate	Votes	%	±%
Liberal	S. Meadowcroft*	2,250	49.0	N/A
Conservative	H. C. Turner	1,542	33.5	−36.2
Labour	J. Pevie	805	17.5	−12.8
Majority		708	15.5	
Turnout		4,597		
Liberal hold		Swing		

=== Didsbury ===
Didsbury
Party	Candidate	Votes	%	±%
Conservative	G. H. White*	4,072	72.0	+2.9
Labour	W. Ingham	1,585	28.0	−2.9
Majority		2,487	44.0	+4.8
Turnout		5,657		
Conservative hold		Swing		

=== Exchange ===
Exchange
Party	Candidate	Votes	%	±%
Conservative	A. S. Harper*	uncontested		
Conservative hold		Swing		

=== Gorton North ===
Gorton North
Party	Candidate	Votes	%	±%
Labour	S. H. Hitchbun*	uncontested		
Labour hold		Swing		

=== Gorton South ===
Gorton South
Party	Candidate	Votes	%	±%
Labour	T. H. Adams*	uncontested		
Labour hold		Swing		

=== Harpurhey ===
Harpurhey
Party	Candidate	Votes	%	±%
Labour	J. Howard*	2,568	52.2	+1.6
Conservative	J. R. Spence	2,352	47.8	−1.6
Majority		216	4.4	+3.2
Turnout		4,920		
Labour hold		Swing		

=== Levenshulme ===
Levenshulme
Party	Candidate	Votes	%	±%
Conservative	H. M. Emery*	uncontested		
Conservative hold		Swing		

=== Longsight ===
Longsight
Party	Candidate	Votes	%	±%
Conservative	W. P. Jackson*	2,793	66.1	+3.9
Labour	I. E. Thorley	1,435	33.9	−3.9
Majority		1,358	32.2	+7.8
Turnout		4,228		
Conservative hold		Swing		

=== Medlock Street ===
Medlock Street
Party	Candidate	Votes	%	±%
Labour	J. Gorman*	1,625	50.2	+1.1
Conservative	H. Timperley	1,610	49.8	−1.1
Majority		15	0.4	
Turnout		3,235		
Labour hold		Swing		

=== Miles Platting ===
Miles Platting
Party	Candidate	Votes	%	±%
Labour	E. J. Howarth	3,136	63.1	−3.7
Conservative	L. Turner	1,834	36.9	+3.7
Majority		1,302	26.2	−7.4
Turnout		4,970		
Labour hold		Swing		

=== Moss Side East ===
Moss Side East
Party	Candidate	Votes	%	±%
Conservative	J. E. Pheasey*	1,442	49.9	+4.3
Labour	W. Gallacher	979	33.9	−9.3
Residents	A. R. Edwards	472	16.2	+5.0
Majority		463	16.0	+13.6
Turnout		2,892		
Conservative hold		Swing		

=== Moss Side West ===
Moss Side West
Party	Candidate	Votes	%	±%
Liberal	H. Quinney*	1,887	64.6	N/A
Labour	T. Knowles	1,032	35.4	+0.4
Majority		855	29.2	
Turnout		2,919		
Liberal hold		Swing		

=== Moston ===
Moston
Party	Candidate	Votes	%	±%
Labour	F. Gregson*	3,198	52.8	−1.3
Conservative	W. Beck	2,863	47.2	+1.3
Majority		335	5.6	−2.6
Turnout		6,061		
Labour hold		Swing		

=== New Cross ===
New Cross
Party	Candidate	Votes	%	±%
Labour	W. Hallows*	uncontested		
Labour hold		Swing		

=== Newton Heath ===
Newton Heath
Party	Candidate	Votes	%	±%
Labour	A. Stevenson	2,878	53.0	+1.1
Conservative	A. Brember	2,553	47.0	−1.1
Majority		325	6.0	+2.2
Turnout		5,431		
Labour gain from Ind. Labour Party		Swing		

=== Openshaw ===
Openshaw
Party	Candidate	Votes	%	±%
Labour	W. H. Oldfield*	uncontested		
Labour hold		Swing		

=== Oxford ===
Oxford
Party	Candidate	Votes	%	±%
Conservative	C. B. Walker*	438	54.5	N/A
Independent	A. Ellison	365	45.5	+0.8
Majority		73	9.0	
Turnout		803		
Conservative hold		Swing		

=== Rusholme ===
Rusholme
Party	Candidate	Votes	%	±%
Liberal	C. H. Barlow*	2,554	70.5	N/A
Labour	W. J. Sharkey	1,069	29.5	−3.9
Majority		1,485	41.0	
Turnout		3,623		
Liberal hold		Swing		

=== St. Ann's ===
St. Ann's
Party	Candidate	Votes	%	±%
Conservative	R. A. Larmuth*	uncontested		
Conservative hold		Swing		

=== St. Clement's ===
St. Clement's
Party	Candidate	Votes	%	±%
Liberal	J. E. Fitzsimons*	uncontested		
Liberal hold		Swing		

=== St. George's ===
St. George's
Party	Candidate	Votes	%	±%
Labour	J. G. Clapham*	1,838	52.0	−7.8
Conservative	R. B. Breeze	1,700	48.0	N/A
Majority		138	4.0	−15.6
Turnout		3,538		
Labour hold		Swing		

=== St. John's ===
St. John's
Party	Candidate	Votes	%	±%
Liberal	M. A. Gibbons*	uncontested		
Liberal hold		Swing		

=== St. Luke's ===
St. Luke's
Party	Candidate	Votes	%	±%
Liberal	F. Tebb*	1,834	52.2	−6.1
Labour	W. Taylor	1,678	47.8	+6.1
Majority		156	4.4	−12.2
Turnout		3,512		
Liberal hold		Swing		

=== St. Mark's ===
St. Mark's
Party	Candidate	Votes	%	±%
Labour	C. Wood*	uncontested		
Labour hold		Swing		

=== St. Michael's ===
St. Michael's
Party	Candidate	Votes	%	±%
Labour	E. Rafferty*	uncontested		
Labour hold		Swing		

=== Withington ===
Withington
Party	Candidate	Votes	%	±%
Conservative	J. S. Hill*	5,405	63.0	N/A
Labour	F. Edwards	3,175	37.0	−8.3
Majority		2,230	26.0	
Turnout		8,580		
Conservative hold		Swing		

=== Wythenshawe ===
Wythenshawe
Party	Candidate	Votes	%	±%
Conservative	H. Bentley*	3,902	59.5	+23.4
Labour	B. Starkie	2,652	40.5	+9.7
Majority		1,250	19.0	+16.0
Turnout		6,553		
Conservative hold		Swing		

== Aldermanic elections ==
=== Aldermanic election, 1 April 1936 ===
Caused by the death on 21 March 1936 of Alderman Ernest Frederick Martin Sutton (Liberal, elected as an alderman by the council on 1 May 1929).

In his place, Councillor Wright Robinson (Labour, Beswick, elected 1 November 1919) was elected as an alderman by the council on 1 April 1936.

Party	Alderman	Ward	Term expires
Labour	Wright Robinson	Rusholme	1937

=== Aldermanic election, 10 June 1936 ===
Caused by the resignation on 3 June 1936 of Alderman Christopher Hornby (Conservative, elected as an alderman by the council on 9 November 1910).

In his place, Councillor Annie Lee (Labour, Gorton South, elected 1 November 1919) was elected as an alderman by the council on 10 June 1936.

Party	Alderman	Ward	Term expires
Labour	Annie Lee	All Saints'	1937

== By-elections between 1935 and 1936 ==
=== Bradford, 23 January 1936 ===
Caused by the election as an alderman of Councillor Elijah John Hart (Labour, Bradford, elected 28 May 1919, previously 1902-08) on 30 October 1935, following the death on 22 October 1935 of Alderman John Harrison (Independent, elected as an alderman by the council on 2 May 1928).

Bradford
Party	Candidate	Votes	%	±%
Labour	E. E. Beavan	2,071	63.2	+0.5
Conservative	H. Poulter	1,204	36.8	−0.5
Majority		867	26.4	+1.0
Turnout		3,275		
Labour hold		Swing		

=== Rusholme, 30 January 1936 ===
Caused by the resignation of Councillor Frank Jackson (Conservative, Rusholme, elected 14 May 1929) on 6 January 1936.

Rusholme
Party	Candidate	Votes	%	±%
Conservative	R. C. Rodgers	1,684	70.5	N/A
Labour	M. Knight	644	26.9	−2.6
Residents	A. R. Edwards	62	2.6	N/A
Majority		1,040	43.6	
Turnout		2,390		
Conservative hold		Swing		

=== Beswick, 30 April 1936 ===
Caused by the election as an alderman of Councillor Wright Robinson (Labour, Beswick, elected 1 November 1919) on 1 April 1936, following the death on 21 March 1936 of Alderman Ernest Frederick Martin Sutton (Liberal, elected as an alderman by the council on 1 May 1929).

Beswick
Party	Candidate	Votes	%	±%
Labour	M. Bell*	uncontested		
Labour hold		Swing		

=== Gorton South, 2 July 1936 ===
Caused by the election as an alderman of Councillor Annie Lee (Labour, Gorton South, elected 1 November 1919) on 10 June 1936, following the resignation on 3 June 1936 of Alderman Christopher Hornby (Conservative, elected as an alderman by the council on 26 October 1910).

Gorton South
Party	Candidate	Votes	%	±%
Labour	J. Sutton	2,540	65.8	N/A
Conservative	E. Shaw	1,319	34.2	N/A
Majority		1,221	31.6	N/A
Turnout		3,859		
Labour hold		Swing		
