= 1950 Manchester City Council election =

Local election in Manchester, England

- 11 May 1950

37 of 144 seats to Manchester City Council 73 seats needed for a majority
	First party	Second party	Third party
Party	Conservative	Labour	Liberal
Last election	19 seats, 49.1%	17 seats, 44.8%	0 seats, 5.0%
Seats before	74	63	7
Seats won	18	19	0
Seats after	76	62	6
Seat change	▲2	▼1	▼1
Popular vote	107,340	100,805	2,863
Percentage	50.5%	47.4%	1.3%
Swing	▲1.4%	▲2.6%	▼3.7%
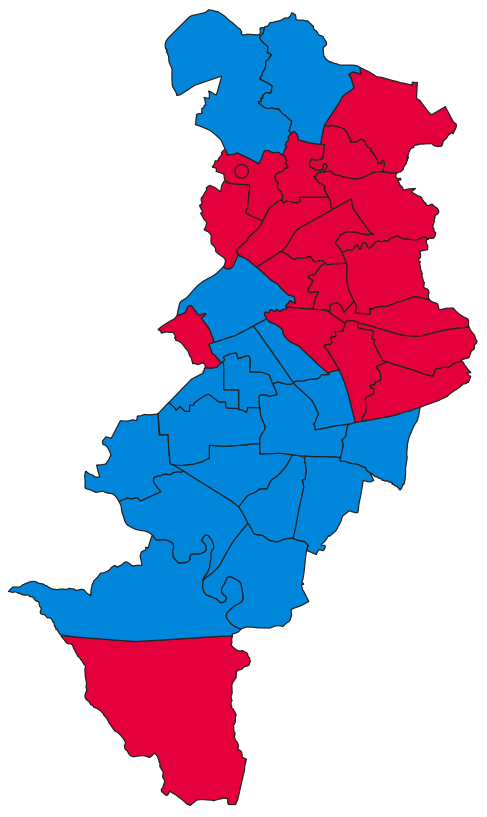
- Map of results of 1950 election
Leader of the Council before election
Conservative
Leader of the Council after election
Conservative

Elections to Manchester City Council were held on Thursday, 11 May 1950. One third of the councillors seats were up for election, with each successful candidate to serve a three-year term of office. Extensive ward boundary changes came into effect at this election, however, the number of councillors was retained and displaced members were allocated to newly created wards for the remainder of their terms.

The Conservative Party retained overall control of the council.

== Election result ==
Party	Votes		Seats			Full Council	
Conservative Party	107,340 (50.5%)	▲1.4	18 (48.6%)	18 / 37	▲2	76 (52.8%)	76 / 144
Labour Party	100,805 (47.4%)	▲2.6	19 (51.4%)	19 / 37	▼1	62 (43.1%)	62 / 144
Liberal Party	2,863 (1.3%)	▼3.7	0 (0.0%)	0 / 37	▼1	6 (4.2%)	6 / 144
Communist	1,464 (0.7%)	Steady	0 (0.0%)	0 / 37	Steady	0 (0.0%)	0 / 144

=== Full council ===
↓
62	6	76

=== Aldermen ===
↓
14	6	16

=== Councillors ===
↓
48	60

== Ward results ==
=== Alexandra Park ===
Alexandra Park
Party	Candidate	Votes	%	±%
Conservative	J. E. Fitzsimons*	5,108	75.8	
Labour	C. Lynch	1,627	24.2	
Majority		3,481	51.6	
Turnout		6,735		
Conservative hold		Swing		

=== All Saints' ===
All Saints'
Party	Candidate	Votes	%	±%
Conservative	L. W. Biggs*	2,606	51.7	
Labour	F. P. Evans	2,347	46.5	
Liberal	R. Frere	89	1.8	
Majority		259	5.2	
Turnout		5,042		
Conservative hold		Swing		

=== Ardwick ===
Ardwick
Party	Candidate	Votes	%	±%
Labour	V. Wilson	3,749	54.3	
Conservative	J. Davies	3,153	45.7	
Majority		596	8.6	
Turnout		6,902		
Labour hold		Swing		

=== Barlow Moor ===
Barlow Moor
Party	Candidate	Votes	%	±%
Conservative	A. Hooley	2,400	53.0	
Labour	B. Lawson	1,250	27.6	
Liberal	H. Bennett	833	18.4	
Communist	W. Prince	49	2.0	
Majority		1,150	25.4	
Turnout		4,532		
Conservative gain from Labour		Swing		

=== Beswick ===
Beswick
Party	Candidate	Votes	%	±%
Labour	H. Baldwin*	3,970	73.4	
Conservative	A. Nixon	1,342	24.8	
Communist	T. Royle	97	1.8	
Majority		2,628	48.6	
Turnout		5,409		
Labour hold		Swing		

=== Blackley ===
Blackley
Party	Candidate	Votes	%	±%
Conservative	J. A. Lynch	4,668	57.0	
Labour	E. Cruse	3,528	43.0	
Majority		1,140	14.0	
Turnout		8,196		
Conservative gain from Liberal		Swing		

=== Bradford ===
Bradford
Party	Candidate	Votes	%	±%
Labour	H. Frankland*	4,421	64.0	
Conservative	E. Rooney	2,488	36.0	
Majority		1,933	28.0	
Turnout		6,909		
Labour hold		Swing		

=== Burnage ===
Burnage
Party	Candidate	Votes	%	±%
Conservative	C. B. Walker*	4,349	59.6	
Labour	W. Frost	2,946	40.4	
Majority		1,403	19.2	
Turnout		7,295		
Conservative hold		Swing		

=== Cheetham ===
Cheetham (2 vacancies)
Party	Candidate	Votes	%	±%
Labour	M. P. Pariser*	2,486	62.0	
Labour	R. B. Prain	2,209	55.1	
Conservative	N. Lee	1,927	48.1	
Liberal	S. Needoff	1,391	34.7	
Majority		282	7.0	
Turnout		4,007		
Labour hold		Swing		
Labour hold		Swing		

=== Chorlton-cum-Hardy ===
Chorlton-cum-Hardy
Party	Candidate	Votes	%	±%
Conservative	G. W. G. Fitzsimons*	5,059	78.9	
Labour	L. L. Hanbridge	1,350	21.1	
Majority		3,709	57.8	
Turnout		6,409		
Conservative hold		Swing		

=== Collegiate Church ===
Collegiate Church
Party	Candidate	Votes	%	±%
Labour	E. Mendell*	2,836	74.6	
Conservative	G. R. Pankhurst	795	20.9	
Communist	M. I. Druck	171	4.5	
Majority		2,041	53.7	
Turnout		3,802		
Labour hold		Swing		

=== Crumpsall ===
Crumpsall
Party	Candidate	Votes	%	±%
Conservative	H. Lomax	4,400	62.4	
Labour	J. B. Ogden	2,510	35.6	
Communist	K. Edwards	145	2.0	
Majority		1,890	26.8	
Turnout		7,055		
Conservative hold		Swing		

=== Didsbury ===
Didsbury
Party	Candidate	Votes	%	±%
Conservative	G. C. Hilditch*	4,326	78.5	
Labour	J. Barlow	1,120	20.3	
Communist	F. Dean	68	1.2	
Majority		3,206	58.2	
Turnout		5,514		
Conservative hold		Swing		

=== Gorton North ===
Gorton North
Party	Candidate	Votes	%	±%
Labour	F. Siddall*	4,604	67.7	
Conservative	T. Brownrigg	2,042	30.0	
Communist	A. Wilde	150	2.3	
Majority		2,562	37.7	
Turnout		6,796		
Labour hold		Swing		

=== Gorton South ===
Gorton South
Party	Candidate	Votes	%	±%
Labour	J. Sutton*	3,046	59.6	
Conservative	F. G. Thompson	1,964	38.4	
Communist	D. C. Corry	104	2.0	
Majority		1,082	21.2	
Turnout		5,114		
Labour hold		Swing		

=== Harpurhey ===
Harpurhey
Party	Candidate	Votes	%	±%
Labour	E. Grant	3,682	55.0	
Conservative	A. L. Mansfield*	2,931	43.8	
Communist	R. F. G. Baughn	85	1.2	
Majority		751	11.2	
Turnout		6,698		
Labour gain from Conservative		Swing		

=== Levenshulme ===
Levenshulme
Party	Candidate	Votes	%	±%
Conservative	R. A. Fieldhouse*	4,500	64.2	
Labour	F. Hatton	2,422	34.6	
Communist	M. J. Farrington	85	1.2	
Majority		2,078	29.6	
Turnout		7,007		
Conservative hold		Swing		

=== Lightbowne ===
Lightbowne
Party	Candidate	Votes	%	±%
Labour	W. Onions*	4,294		
Conservative	J. H. Ferrington			
Communist	E. C. Dalton			
Majority				
Turnout				
Labour hold		Swing		

=== Longsight ===
Longsight
Party	Candidate	Votes	%	±%
Conservative	H. Sharp*	4,028	64.9	
Labour	J. Conway	2,177	35.1	
Majority		1,851	29.8	
Turnout		6,205		
Conservative hold		Swing		

=== Miles Platting ===
Miles Platting
Party	Candidate	Votes	%	±%
Labour	W. C. Chadwick*	2,949	62.7	
Conservative	J. D. Cheetham	1,755	37.3	
Majority		1,194	25.4	
Turnout		4,704		
Labour hold		Swing		

=== Moss Side East ===
Moss Side East
Party	Candidate	Votes	%	±%
Conservative	G. J. Playford	2,724	53.2	
Labour	D. Molloy	2,273	44.4	
Communist	L. B. Johnson	125	2.4	
Majority		451	8.8	
Turnout		5,122		
Conservative gain from Labour		Swing		

=== Moss Side West ===
Moss Side West
Party	Candidate	Votes	%	±%
Conservative	S. C. Brewster*	3,230	55.1	
Labour	H. Collins	2,633	44.9	
Majority		597	10.2	
Turnout		5,863		
Conservative hold		Swing		

=== Moston ===
Moston
Party	Candidate	Votes	%	±%
Labour	W. M. McGuirk*	3,855	53.3	
Conservative	F. E. Doran	3,378	46.7	
Majority		477	6.6	
Turnout		7,233		
Labour hold		Swing		

=== New Cross ===
New Cross
Party	Candidate	Votes	%	±%
Labour	W. Murray*	2,748	58.4	
Conservative	D. J. Edwards	1,954	41.6	
Majority		794	16.8	
Turnout		4,702		
Labour hold		Swing		

=== Newton Heath ===
Newton Heath
Party	Candidate	Votes	%	±%
Labour	C. E. P. Stott*	3,177	59.6	
Conservative	W. H. Priestnall	2,153	40.4	
Majority		1,024	19.2	
Turnout		5,330		
Labour hold		Swing		

=== Newtown ===
Newtown
Party	Candidate	Votes	%	±%
Labour	W. Collingson*	3,489	69.0	
Conservative	W. B. Kinsey	1,567	31.0	
Majority		1,922	38.0	
Turnout		5,056		
Labour hold		Swing		

=== Northenden ===
Northenden
Party	Candidate	Votes	%	±%
Conservative	T. C. Hewlett*	3,766	62.8	
Labour	L. Cohen	2,233	37.2	
Majority		1,533	25.6	
Turnout		5,999		
Conservative hold		Swing		

=== Old Moat ===
Old Moat
Party	Candidate	Votes	%	±%
Conservative	W. Sharp	3,128	60.6	
Labour	W. M. Parkinson	2,031	39.4	
Majority		1,097	21.2	
Turnout		5,159		
Conservative hold		Swing		

=== Openshaw ===
Openshaw
Party	Candidate	Votes	%	±%
Labour	T. Nally*	4,579	58.8	
Conservative	W. R. Swan	3,030	38.9	
Communist	T. Rowlandson	184	2.3	
Majority		1,549	19.9	
Turnout		7,793		
Labour hold		Swing		

=== Rusholme ===
Rusholme
Party	Candidate	Votes	%	±%
Conservative	R. C. Rodgers*	4,358	72.9	
Labour	H. Smith	1,621	27.1	
Majority		2,737	45.8	
Turnout		5,979		
Conservative hold		Swing		

=== St. George's ===
St. George's
Party	Candidate	Votes	%	±%
Labour	A. S. Reid	3,455	60.2	
Conservative	F. Hyde	2,280	39.8	
Majority		1,175	20.4	
Turnout		5,735		
Labour hold		Swing		

=== St. Luke's ===
St. Luke's
Party	Candidate	Votes	%	±%
Conservative	W. E. A. Yates*	2,778	51.9	
Labour	W. Massey	2,572	48.1	
Majority		206	3.8	
Turnout		5,350		
Conservative hold		Swing		

=== St. Mark's ===
St. Mark's
Party	Candidate	Votes	%	±%
Labour	J. W. Ellershaw*	3,696	58.3	
Conservative	J. Kilroy	2,645	41.7	
Majority		1,051	16.6	
Turnout		6,341		
Labour hold		Swing		

=== St. Peter's ===
St. Peter's
Party	Candidate	Votes	%	±%
Conservative	H. D. Parks	2,082	69.7	
Labour	A. Harvey	907	30.3	
Majority		1,175	39.4	
Turnout		2,989		
Conservative hold		Swing		

=== Withington ===
Withington
Party	Candidate	Votes	%	±%
Conservative	W. H. Scholfield*	3,933	71.7	
Labour	N. Morris	999	18.2	
Liberal	F. W. Wilson	550	10.1	
Majority		2,934	53.5	
Turnout		5,482		
Conservative hold		Swing		

=== Wythenshawe ===
Wythenshawe
Party	Candidate	Votes	%	±%
Labour	H. S. Gatley*	5,308	53.1	
Conservative	T. Duffy	4,493	44.9	
Communist	G. Taylor	201	2.0	
Majority		815	8.2	
Turnout		10,002		
Labour hold		Swing		

== Aldermanic elections ==
=== Aldermanic election, 26 July 1950 ===
Caused by the death on 14 July 1950 of Alderman Stanley Hitchbun (Labour, elected as an alderman by the council on 4 December 1946).

In his place, Councillor Herbert Lomax (Conservative, Crumpsall, elected 15 March 1932) was elected as an alderman by the council on 29 April 1953.

Party	Alderman	Ward	Term expires
Conservative	Herbert Lomax	St. George's	1955

=== Aldermanic elections, 3 January 1951 ===
Caused by the death on 2 December 1950 of Alderman T. H. Adams (Labour, elected as an alderman by the council on 4 July 1945).

In his place, Councillor J. E. Fitzsimons (Conservative, Alexandra Park, elected 1 November 1932) was elected as an alderman by the council on 3 January 1951.

Party	Alderman	Ward	Term expires
Conservative	J. E. Fitzsimons	Openshaw	1952

Caused by the death on 20 December 1950 of Alderman George Frank Titt (Labour, elected as an alderman by the council on 4 July 1928).

In his place, Councillor Harold Bentley (Conservative, Withington, elected 9 November 1939; previously 1932-38) was elected as an alderman by the council on 3 January 1951.

Party	Alderman	Ward	Term expires
Conservative	Harold Bentley	Collegiate Church	1952

=== Aldermanic elections, 7 February 1951 ===
Caused by the death on 26 December 1950 of Alderman H. M. Emery (Conservative, elected as an alderman by the council on 7 June 1944).

In his place, Councillor R. S. Harper (Conservative, All Saints', elected 1 November 1932) was elected as an alderman by the council on 7 February 1951 1951.

Party	Alderman	Ward	Term expires
Conservative	R. S. Harper	Alexandra Park	1952

Caused by the death on 3 January 1951 of Alderman Samuel Fitton (Conservative, elected as an alderman by the council on 6 September 1944).

In his place, Councillor Leslie Lever M.P. (Labour, Miles Platting, elected 15 December 1949; previously 1932-49, Alderman 1949) was elected as an alderman by the council on 7 February 1951.

Party	Alderman	Ward	Term expires
Labour	Leslie Lever	Ardwick	1952

== By-elections between 1950 and 1951 ==
=== Crumpsall, 31 August 1950 ===
Caused by the death of Councillor N. H. McDowall (Conservative, Crumpsall, elected 12 May 1949) on 12 July 1950; and by the election as an alderman of Councillor Herbert Lomax (Conservative, Crumpsall, elected 15 March 1932) on 26 July 1950 following the death on 14 July 1950 of Alderman Stanley Hitchbun (Labour, elected as an alderman by the council on 4 December 1946).

Crumpsall (2 vacancies)
Party	Candidate	Votes	%	±%
Conservative	R. Collier	4,056	63.0	+0.6
Conservative	S. Tomlinson	3,986	61.9	−0.5
Labour	W. Lewis	2,465	38.3	+2.7
Labour	J. B. Ogden	2,375	36.9	+1.3
Majority		1,521	23.6	−3.2
Turnout		6,441		
Conservative hold		Swing		
Conservative hold		Swing		

=== Alexandra Park, 1 February 1951 ===
Caused by the election as an alderman of Councillor J. E. Fitzsimons (Conservative, Alexandra Park, elected 1 November 1932) on 3 January 1951, following the death on 2 December 1950 of Alderman T. H. Adams (Labour, elected as an alderman by the council on 4 July 1945).

Alexandra Park
Party	Candidate	Votes	%	±%
Conservative	H. Ward	3,547	81.7	+5.9
Labour	J. Dutton	792	18.3	−5.9
Majority		2,755	63.4	+11.8
Turnout		4,339		
Conservative hold		Swing		
