= United Machine Workers' Association =

Former trade union of the United Kingdom

- Merged into: Amalgamated Engineering Union
- Founded: 1844
- Dissolved: 1920
- Headquarters: 48 Plymouth Grove, Manchester
- Location: United Kingdom
- Members: 14,000 (1915)
- Key people: Matthew Arrandale (Gen Sec)
- Affiliations: TUC, FEST, GFTU

The United Machine Workers' Association was a trade union representing engineers in the United Kingdom.

The union was founded in 1844 in Manchester and initially grew only slowly, having to compete directly with the larger Amalgamated Society of Engineers (ASE) for members. Matthew Arrandale became secretary in 1885, when it still had only 371 members. Under his leadership, it grew rapidly. This enabled him to take the role full-time in 1887, and the union reached 2,500 members by 1891. That year, the union was a founder member of the Federation of Engineering and Shipbuilding Trades in 1891.

The union had 3,800 members by 1900, and again began growing quickly, with 14,000 in 1915. From 1916, it admitted all engineering workers who used machines, regardless of level of skill or training. Following World War I, it began discussions on a possible merger with the ASE, and the two merged along with six other unions in 1920, forming the Amalgamated Engineering Union.

== General Secretaries ==
1885: Matthew Arrandale
1913: Robert H. Coates
