= Matthew Arrandale =

British trade unionist and politician

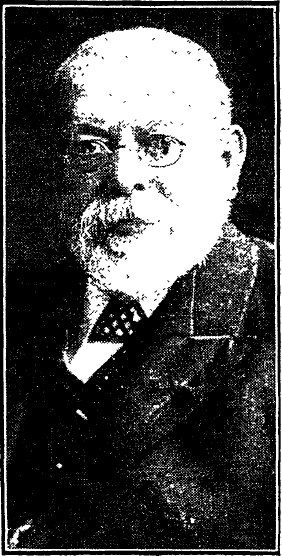
Arrandale, late in life

Matthew Arrandale (died 18 September 1913) was a British trade unionist and politician.

Born in the Clayton area of Manchester, Arrandale's father was killed in a mining accident. As a result, Arrandale was sent out to work at the age of nine, working as a half-timer in a cotton mill. Four years later, he began working full-time in a dye works.

In 1863, Arrandale decided he wished to move into engineering, and found employment at a railway carriageworks. After a variety of jobs, he joined the United Machine Workers' Association in 1874, and soon rose to prominence, being elected as president of the Manchester and Salford Trades Council three years later, and as the Machine Workers' part-time general secretary in 1885.

Arrandale was a delegate to the Trades Union Congress (TUC) for this first time in 1886, and gave speeches opposing overtime and piecework which gained national attention. As a result, he was sacked from his job, but the Machine Workers agreed to make his role with the union full-time. He proved highly successful, increasing membership from 371 in 1885 to 5,200 by 1909.

Arrandale was also politically active, and was elected to Manchester City Council in 1895; he also served as a justice of the peace. He was the TUC's representative to the American Federation of Labour in 1902, served on the Parliamentary Committee of the TUC from 1908, was on the Management Committee of the General Federation of Trade Unions, and was vice-president of the Federation of Engineering and Shipbuilding Trades.

In mid-1913, Arrandale became ill, and resigned his union positions. He died in September that year.

Trade union offices
Preceded by ?	General Secretary of the United Machine Workers' Association; 1885 – 1913	Succeeded by Robert H. Coates
Preceded by Ben Tillett and Francis Chandler	Trades Union Congress representative to the American Federation of Labour; 1902; With: Enoch Edwards	Succeeded by William Mullin and James O'Grady
