= John Williams (trade unionist) =

British trade unionist and political activist

John Williams (born 1873) was a British trade unionist and political activist.

Born in Cheshire, Williams worked as a farm labourer, a brickmaker, and then as a gas stoker. In this last job, he joined the National Union of Gas Workers and General Labourers. From 1903 to 1905, he worked as a gold miner in West Africa, but he then returned to Cheshire. He became the chair of the Crewe Labour Party and also of the town's trades council. In 1908, he was elected to Crewe Town Council, serving until 1917. He was also chair of the Railway Workers' Joint Trade Movement.

During the First World War, Williams served on the Cheshire Appeal Tribunal, and in 1917 he became the full-time Lancashire District Organiser of the National Union of General Workers, working closely with J. R. Clynes. Although this entailed moving to Manchester, he was selected as the Labour Party candidate for Northwich at the 1918 United Kingdom general election. He withdrew before the vote, but did stand for the seat at the 1922 and 1923 United Kingdom general elections, taking 45.8% of the vote and second place in 1922, but only third place in 1923. At the 1924 United Kingdom general election, he instead stood in Macclesfield, taking second place, and matching this feat at the 1929 United Kingdom general election.

In 1926, Williams was elected to Manchester City Council, representing All Saints ward. He stood down in 1932, but lived until at least 1937.
