= Johnny McMahon (English footballer) =

English footballer (1880/81–??)

Johnny McMahon was a footballer who played as a centre half for Manchester City between 1902 and 1906.

McMahon began his career at Glasgow Clyde before transferring to Preston North End in October 1900 at the age of 19, he was described as a powerful left back. He made 65 appearances for Preston North End before transferring to Manchester City in 1902. He made his Manchester City debut in December 1902 in a 1–1 draw against Manchester United. He was part of the City team which defeated Bolton Wanderers 1–0 to win the 1904 FA Cup Final.

He made 100 league appearances for Manchester City and scored one goal. In 1906 he signed for Bury with whom he made 60 appearances for before retiring from the game in the 1908/09 football season.

== Honours ==
Manchester City

- FA Cup (1): 1904
