= Richard Harper (politician) =

English local politician

Sir Richard Stephenson Harper JP (30 December 1902 – 16 November 1973) was an English local politician and engineer.

== Early life and career ==
Harper was born on 30 December 1902, the only son of Richard Stephenson Harper JP and Edith C. Harper of Harnham House, Slade Lane, Levenshulme. His family had a long tradition of public service in Manchester, one of his ancestors was a founder of Manchester and Salford Co-operative Society, while his grandfather was secretary of the Cobden Liberal Club in Lower Broughton, and his father was a member of Manchester City Council from 1909 until his death in 1940. He attended Manchester and Chorlton-cum-Hardy Grammar Schools, before studying at Bonar Law College in Hertfordshire.

In business, he worked in electrical and general engineering from 1920 to 1925, when he became Private Secretary to his father.

== Local politics ==
In 1932, he joined his father on Manchester City Council, representing All Saints' ward as a Conservative. He held this seat until February 1951 when he was elevated to the Aldermanic bench. He was Lord Mayor for the year 1954–55 and led the Conservative Group on the Council from 1956 until 1965.

Harper also contested the Exchange seat for the Conservatives in the 1950 general election and was a justice of the peace in Manchester from 1949. According to The Guardian, Harper was "an expert on local government and housing". He was knighted in 1958 and was made an honorary Freeman of Manchester in 1973.

== Personal life ==
He died on 16 November 1973, leaving a son and a widow, his wife Lily, the only daughter of Nathaniel and Elizabeth Walker of Manchester.

Honorary titles
Preceded by Abraham Moss	Lord Mayor of Manchester; 1954–1955	Succeeded by Tom Regan
