= 1930 Manchester City Council election =

Local election in Manchester

- 1 November 1930

35 of 140 seats on Manchester City Council 71 seats needed for a majority
	First party	Second party	Third party
Party	Conservative	Labour	Liberal
Last election	8 seats, 38.1%	20 seats, 39.5%	7 seats, 20.6%
Seats before	54	52	29
Seats won	18	11	5
Seats after	59	50	27
Seat change	▲5	▼2	▼2
Popular vote	55,178	45,149	25,696
Percentage	42.1%	34.4%	19.6%
Swing	▲4.0%	▼5.1%	▼1.0%
	Fourth party
Party	Independent
Last election	0 seats, 0.1%
Seats before	3
Seats won	1
Seats after	3
Seat change	Steady
Popular vote	160
Percentage	2.3%
Swing	▲2.2%
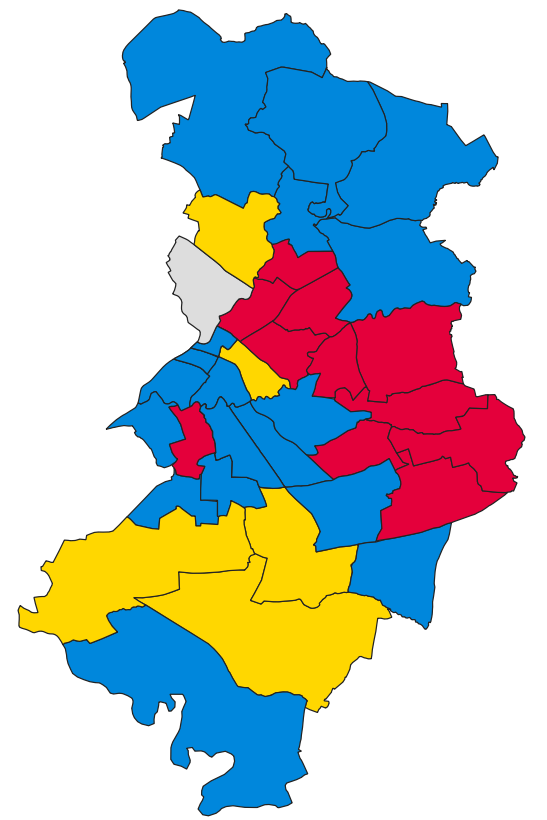
- Map of results of 1930 election
Leader of the Council before election
No overall control
Leader of the Council after election
No overall control

Elections to Manchester City Council were held on Saturday, 1 November 1930. One third of the councillors seats were up for election, with each successful candidate to serve a three-year term of office. The council remained under no overall control.

== Election result ==
Party	Votes		Seats			Full Council	
Conservative Party	55,178 (42.1%)	▲4.0	18 (51.4%)	18 / 35	▲5	59 (42.1%)	59 / 140
Labour Party	45,149 (34.4%)	▼5.1	11 (31.4%)	11 / 35	▼2	50 (35.7%)	50 / 140
Liberal Party	25,696 (19.6%)	▼1.0	5 (14.3%)	5 / 35	▼2	27 (19.3%)	27 / 140
Independent	3,037 (2.3%)	▲2.2	1 (2.9%)	1 / 35	Steady	3 (2.1%)	3 / 140
Independent Labour Party	0 (0.0%)	N/A	0 (0.0%)	0 / 35	Steady	1 (0.7%)	1 / 144
English League for the Taxation of Land Values	1,272 (1.0%)	▲1.0	0 (0.0%)	0 / 35	▼1	0 (0.0%)	0 / 140
Independent Conservative	559 (0.4%)	▼0.1	0 (0.0%)	0 / 35	Steady	0 (0.0%)	0 / 140
Residents	175 (0.1%)	▼0.9	0 (0.0%)	0 / 35	Steady	0 (0.0%)	0 / 140
Communist	98 (0.1%)	Steady	0 (0.0%)	0 / 35	Steady	0 (0.0%)	0 / 140

=== Full council ===
↓
1	50	27	3	59

=== Aldermen ===
↓
5	9	1	20

=== Councillors ===
↓
1	45	18	2	39

== Ward results ==
=== All Saints' ===
All Saints'
Party	Candidate	Votes	%	±%
Conservative	W. Davies*	1,808	56.3	+22.2
Labour	L. Corcoran	844	26.3	−18.6
Ind. Conservative	J. Griffin	559	17.4	−2.9
Majority		964	30.0	
Turnout		3,211		
Conservative hold		Swing		

=== Ardwick ===
Ardwick
Party	Candidate	Votes	%	±%
Conservative	M. L. K. Jones*	3,355	62.6	+23.3
Labour	T. M. Larrad	2,003	37.4	−23.3
Majority		1,352	25.2	
Turnout		5,358		
Conservative hold		Swing		

=== Beswick ===
Beswick
Party	Candidate	Votes	%	±%
Labour	L. B. Cox*	uncontested		
Labour hold		Swing		

=== Blackley ===
Blackley
Party	Candidate	Votes	%	±%
Conservative	J. E. Littler*	2,674	67.7	N/A
Labour	W. Collingson	1,278	32.3	−0.4
Majority		1,396	35.4	
Turnout		3,952		
Conservative hold		Swing		

=== Bradford ===
Bradford
Party	Candidate	Votes	%	±%
Labour	J. Binns*	2,707	52.6	N/A
Conservative	S. Bloor	2,436	47.4	N/A
Majority		271	5.2	N/A
Turnout		5,143		
Labour hold		Swing		

=== Cheetham ===
Cheetham
Party	Candidate	Votes	%	±%
Liberal	S. Laski*	3,240	82.3	N/A
Labour	C. E. P. Stott	696	17.7	N/A
Majority		2,544	64.6	N/A
Turnout		3,936		
Liberal hold		Swing		

=== Chorlton-cum-Hardy ===
Chorlton-cum-Hardy
Party	Candidate	Votes	%	±%
Liberal	S. D. Simon*	6,286	87.5	+34.7
Labour	E. Topham	840	11.7	N/A
Residents	A. M. Edwards	61	0.8	N/A
Majority		5,446	75.8	+70.2
Turnout		7,187		
Liberal hold		Swing		

=== Collegiate Church ===
Collegiate Church
Party	Candidate	Votes	%	±%
Independent	D. Gouldman*	1,323	55.2	N/A
Liberal	J. E. Fitzsimons	657	27.4	−16.3
Labour	E. J. Mendel	415	17.4	−0.2
Majority		666	27.8	
Turnout		2,395		
Independent hold		Swing		

=== Collyhurst ===
Collyhurst
Party	Candidate	Votes	%	±%
Labour	I. Floyd*	2,654	50.3	−18.1
Conservative	T. C. Owtram	2,624	49.7	+18.1
Majority		30	0.6	−36.2
Turnout		5,278		
Labour hold		Swing		

=== Crumpsall ===
Crumpsall
Party	Candidate	Votes	%	±%
Conservative	G. S. Grindley	1,913	51.2	+15.9
Liberal	F. L. Chaplin	1,674	44.9	+3.4
Independent	W. Dennison	145	3.9	−0.4
Majority		239	6.3	
Turnout		3,732		
Conservative hold		Swing		

=== Didsbury ===
Didsbury
Party	Candidate	Votes	%	±%
Conservative	N. Westcott	2,793	54.8	+4.2
Liberal	D. Porter	2,306	45.2	−4.2
Majority		485	9.6	+8.4
Turnout		5,099		
Conservative hold		Swing		

=== Exchange ===
Exchange
Party	Candidate	Votes	%	±%
Conservative	G. Westcott*	uncontested		
Conservative hold		Swing		

=== Gorton North ===
Gorton North
Party	Candidate	Votes	%	±%
Labour	T. Walker*	2,793	70.2	N/A
Liberal	T. Dunbevand	1,184	29.8	N/A
Majority		1,609	40.4	N/A
Turnout		3,977		
Labour hold		Swing		

=== Gorton South ===
Gorton South
Party	Candidate	Votes	%	±%
Labour	J. H. Cox	2,662	53.2	−15.9
Conservative	C. Taylor	2,339	46.8	+15.9
Majority		323	6.4	−31.8
Turnout		5,001		
Labour hold		Swing		

=== Harpurhey ===
Harpurhey
Party	Candidate	Votes	%	±%
Conservative	C. F. Howarth	2,766	54.9	+8.4
Labour	W. Onions*	2,273	45.1	−8.4
Majority		493	9.8	
Turnout		5,039		
Conservative gain from Labour		Swing		

=== Levenshulme ===
Levenshulme
Party	Candidate	Votes	%	±%
Conservative	S. R. Fairfoull*	2,819	71.7	+5.5
Labour	W. N. Bayes	1,110	28.3	−5.5
Majority		1,709	43.4	+11.0
Turnout		3,929		
Conservative hold		Swing		

=== Longsight ===
Longsight
Party	Candidate	Votes	%	±%
Conservative	J. H. Meachin*	3,402	72.7	+7.9
Labour	J. Garside	1,278	27.3	−7.9
Majority		2,124	45.4	+15.8
Turnout		4,680		
Conservative hold		Swing		

=== Medlock Street ===
Medlock Street
Party	Candidate	Votes	%	±%
Labour	E. L. Jones*	2,152	55.4	+0.1
Conservative	A. Ireland	1,732	44.6	+0.9
Majority		420	10.8	−0.8
Turnout		3,884		
Labour hold		Swing		

=== Miles Platting ===
Miles Platting
Party	Candidate	Votes	%	±%
Labour	C. E. Wood*	2,778	54.0	−10.7
Conservative	A. Hodgson	2,371	46.0	+11.1
Majority		407	8.0	−21.8
Turnout		5,149		
Labour hold		Swing		

=== Moss Side East ===
Moss Side East
Party	Candidate	Votes	%	±%
Conservative	H. A. E. Ramsden	1,825	52.3	+16.5
Liberal	C. Gandy	1,068	30.6	+3.0
Labour	T. J. Feigherey	584	16.7	−19.3
Residents	A. M. Edwards	14	0.4	−0.2
Majority		757	21.7	
Turnout		3,491		
Conservative gain from Liberal		Swing		

=== Moss Side West ===
Moss Side West
Party	Candidate	Votes	%	±%
Conservative	B. S. Vivante	1,795	46.8	N/A
English League for the Taxation of Land Values	A. H. Weller*	1,272	33.1	N/A
Labour	R. McKeon	614	16.0	−9.2
Independent	T. M. Draper	142	3.7	N/A
Residents	A. R. Edwards	16	0.4	N/A
Majority		523	13.7	
Turnout		3,839		
Conservative gain from English League for the Taxation of Land Values		Swing		

=== Moston ===
Moston
Party	Candidate	Votes	%	±%
Conservative	F. Farrington*	3,072	54.6	+22.6
Labour	G. S. Dixon	1,881	33.4	−15.1
Liberal	B. Adler	671	11.9	−7.6
Majority		1,191	21.2	
Turnout		5,624		
Conservative hold		Swing		

=== New Cross ===
New Cross
Party	Candidate	Votes	%	±%
Labour	R. Matthews*	3,047	55.6	−1.6
Conservative	B. Walker	2,436	44.4	+1.7
Majority		611	11.2	−3.8
Turnout		5,483		
Labour hold		Swing		

=== Newton Heath ===
Newton Heath
Party	Candidate	Votes	%	±%
Conservative	L. Turner	2,599	55.8	+8.3
Labour	B. Clare	2,062	44.2	−8.3
Majority		537	11.6	
Turnout		4,661		
Conservative gain from Liberal		Swing		

=== Openshaw ===
Openshaw
Party	Candidate	Votes	%	±%
Labour	R. Moss	3,037	66.6	−30.1
Independent	C. G. Clancy	1,427	31.3	N/A
Communist	S. Nuttall	98	2.1	−1.2
Majority		1,610	35.3	−58.1
Turnout		4,562		
Labour hold		Swing		

=== Oxford ===
Oxford
Party	Candidate	Votes	%	±%
Conservative	O. P. Lancashire*	uncontested		
Conservative hold		Swing		

=== Rusholme ===
Rusholme
Party	Candidate	Votes	%	±%
Liberal	R. G. Edwards*	2,295	53.6	−4.8
Conservative	J. Vickers	1,906	44.5	+4.7
Residents	A. R. Edwards	84	1.9	+0.1
Majority		389	9.1	−9.5
Turnout		4,285		
Liberal hold		Swing		

=== St. Ann's ===
St. Ann's
Party	Candidate	Votes	%	±%
Conservative	W. Challoner	566	72.5	+2.8
Liberal	A. Payne	215	27.5	−2.8
Majority		351	45.0	+5.6
Turnout		781		
Conservative hold		Swing		

=== St. Clement's ===
St. Clement's
Party	Candidate	Votes	%	±%
Liberal	B. McManus*	862	43.2	+15.9
Conservative	J. W. Brownhill	621	31.1	−2.2
Labour	J. Cossey	512	25.7	−13.1
Majority		241	12.1	
Turnout		1,995		
Liberal hold		Swing		

=== St. George's ===
St. George's
Party	Candidate	Votes	%	±%
Conservative	A. W. L. Smith	2,114	59.4	+30.4
Labour	A. Titt	1,447	40.6	−8.7
Majority		667	18.8	
Turnout		3,561		
Conservative gain from Labour		Swing		

=== St. John's ===
St. John's
Party	Candidate	Votes	%	±%
Conservative	J. E. Burgess*	1,131	85.6	+40.5
Labour	W. R. Watson	190	14.4	N/A
Majority		941	71.2	
Turnout		1,321		
Conservative hold		Swing		

=== St. Luke's ===
St. Luke's
Party	Candidate	Votes	%	±%
Conservative	T. Harrison*	2,504	63.7	+19.4
Labour	E. Davies	1,427	36.3	−1.0
Majority		1,077	27.4	
Turnout		3,931		
Conservative hold		Swing		

=== St. Mark's ===
St. Mark's
Party	Candidate	Votes	%	±%
Labour	I. Brassington*	2,154	57.7	−18.5
Conservative	F. P. Ogden	1,577	42.3	+18.5
Majority		577	15.4	−37.0
Turnout		3,731		
Labour hold		Swing		

=== St. Michael's ===
St. Michael's
Party	Candidate	Votes	%	±%
Labour	T. Cassidy*	uncontested		
Labour hold		Swing		

=== Withington ===
Withington
Party	Candidate	Votes	%	±%
Liberal	A. P. Simon*	5,238	75.4	+25.8
Labour	A. McIlwrick	1,711	24.6	N/A
Majority		3,527	50.8	
Turnout		6,949		
Liberal hold		Swing		

== Aldermanic elections ==
=== Aldermanic election, 7 January 1931 ===
Caused by the resignation on 3 December 1930 of Alderman Frederick John Robertshaw (Conservative, elected as an alderman by the council on 6 February 1925).

In his place, Councillor Joseph Binns (Labour, Bradford, elected 4 August 1915) was elected as an alderman by the council on 7 January 1931.

Party	Alderman	Ward	Term expires
Labour	Joseph Binns	Exchange	1934

=== Aldermanic election, 6 May 1931 ===
Caused by the creation of Wythenshawe ward on 25 March 1931, requiring the election of an alderman by the council.

Councillor T. R. Hewlett (Conservative, St. John's, elected 1 November 1922, previously 1913-21) was elected as an alderman by the council on 6 May 1931.

Party	Alderman	Ward	Term expires
Conservative	T. R. Hewlett	Wythenshawe	1934

=== Aldermanic elections, 29 October 1931 ===
Caused by the death on 8 October 1931 of Alderman James Johnson (Conservative, elected as an alderman by the council on 1 August 1923).

In his place, Councillor H. D. Judson (Conservative, St. Clements's, elected 2 November 1925, previously 1911-24) was elected as an alderman by the council on 29 October 1931.

Party	Alderman	Ward	Term expires
Conservative	H. D. Judson	Oxford	1934

Caused by the death on 16 October 1931 of Alderman John James Kendall (Liberal, elected as an alderman by the council on 24 June 1927).

In his place, Councillor Colonel George Westcott (Conservative, Exchange, elected 1 November 1911) was elected as an alderman by the council on 29 October 1931.

Party	Alderman	Ward	Term expires
Conservative	George Westcott	Chorlton-cum-Hardy	1931

== By-elections between 1930 and 1931 ==
=== Bradford, 20 January 1931 ===
Caused by the election as an alderman of Councillor Joseph Binns (Labour, Bradford, elected 4 August 1915) on 7 January 1931, following the resignation on 3 December 1930 of Alderman Frederick John Robertshaw (Conservative, elected as an alderman by the council on 6 February 1925).

Bradford
Party	Candidate	Votes	%	±%
Conservative	S. Bloor	2,701	54.5	+7.1
Labour	B. Clare	2,251	45.5	−7.1
Majority		450	9.0	
Turnout		4,952		
Conservative gain from Labour		Swing		

=== Wythenshawe, 25 March 1931 ===
Caused by the creation of Wythenshawe ward on 25 March 1931, requiring the election of all three councillors. The first-placed candidate was set to serve a three-year term, expiring in 1934, the second-placed candidate was set to serve a two-year term, expiring in 1933, and the third-placed candidate was set to serve a one-year term, expiring in 1932.

Wythenshawe (3 vacancies)
Party	Candidate	Votes	%	±%
Conservative	C. R. W. Menzies	1,193	36.5	
Independent	W. Wolstenholme	1,080	33.1	
Conservative	H. Ireland	998	30.6	
Conservative	S. Lowe	995	30.5	
Liberal	W. Kennedy	766	23.5	
Labour	E. Whiteley	226	6.9	
Labour	G. Dixon	137	4.2	
Majority		3	0.1	
Turnout		3,265		
Conservative win (new seat)				
Independent win (new seat)				
Conservative win (new seat)				

=== St. John's, 19 May 1931 ===
Caused by the election as an alderman of Councillor T. R. Hewlett (Conservative, St. John's, elected 1 November 1922, previously 1913-21) on 6 May 1931, following the creation of Wythenshawe ward on 25 March 1931, requiring the election of an alderman by the council.

St. John's
Party	Candidate	Votes	%	±%
Liberal	F. E. Tylecote	885	57.6	N/A
Conservative	G. Egerton Pollitt	644	41.9	−43.7
Residents	A. R. Edwards	11	0.7	N/A
Majority		241	15.7	
Turnout		1,537		
Liberal gain from Conservative		Swing		

=== Wythenshawe, 4 August 1931 ===
Caused by the resignation of Councillor William Wolstenholme (Independent, Wythenshawe, elected 25 March 1931) on 1 July 1931.

Wythenshawe
Party	Candidate	Votes	%	±%
Conservative	S. Lowe	uncontested		
Conservative hold		Swing		
