= Moss Side West =

- Ward
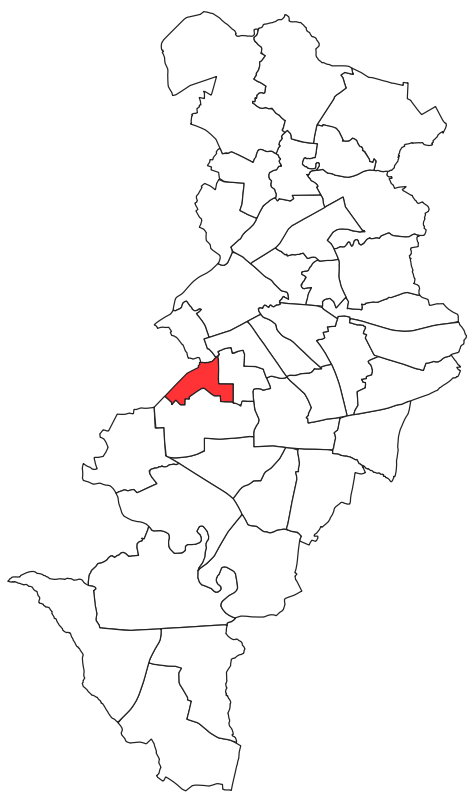
- Moss Side West ward (1954) within Manchester

- Coat of arms
- Country: United Kingdom
- Constituent country: England
- Region: North West England
- County borough: Manchester
- Created: November 1904
- Named for: Moss Side

Government
  - Type: Unicameral
  - Body: Manchester City Council
- UK Parliamentary Constituency: Manchester Moss Side

Moss Side West was an electoral division of Manchester City Council which was represented from 1904 until 1971. It covered parts of Moss Side and Whalley Range.

== Overview ==
Moss Side West ward was created in 1904, as a result of the Manchester Extension Scheme 1904, which transferred the urban districts of Moss Side and Withington to the Manchester corporation. Initially, the ward covered that part of the former Moss Side Urban District to the west of Princess Road. In 1919, an area to the west of Broadfield Road was transferred to the ward from the Moss Side East ward, these boundaries were largely unaffected by a further boundary revision in 1950. The ward was abolished in 1971, and its remaining area was divided between the Alexandra ward and the new Moss Side ward.

From its creation until 1918, the ward formed part of the Manchester South Parliamentary constituency. From 1918 until 1950, it was part of the Manchester Hulme Parliamentary constituency. From 1950 until its abolition, it was part of the Manchester Moss Side Parliamentary constituency.

== Councillors ==
Election	Councillor	Councillor	Councillor
1904	A. Grierson (Ind)	T. Herbert (Lib)	W. Hynes (Lib)
1905	A. Grierson (Ind)	T. Herbert (Lib)	W. Hynes (Lib)
1906	A. Grierson (Lib)	T. Herbert (Lib)	W. Hynes (Lib)
April 1907	A. Grierson (Lib)	W. Flanagan (Con)	W. Hynes (Lib)
1907	A. Grierson (Lib)	W. Flanagan (Con)	W. Hynes (Lib)
1908	A. Grierson (Lib)	W. Flanagan (Con)	W. Rowlands (Lib)
1909	A. Grierson (Lib)	W. Flanagan (Con)	W. Rowlands (Lib)
1910	J. H. Birley (Con)	W. Flanagan (Con)	W. Rowlands (Lib)
1911	J. H. Birley (Con)	W. Flanagan (Con)	W. Rowlands (Lib)
1912	J. H. Birley (Con)	W. Flanagan (Con)	W. Rowlands (Lib)
1913	J. Mathewson Watson (Lib)	W. Flanagan (Con)	W. Rowlands (Lib)
October 1914	J. Mathewson Watson (Lib)	J. H. Birley (Con)	W. Rowlands (Lib)
1914	J. Mathewson Watson (Lib)	J. H. Birley (Con)	W. Rowlands (Lib)
1919	J. Mathewson Watson (Lib)	J. H. Birley (Con)	W. Rowlands (Lib)
1920	J. Mathewson Watson (Lib)	J. H. Birley (Con)	W. Rowlands (Lib)
1921	J. Mathewson Watson (Lib)	J. H. Birley (Con)	T. Dunham (Con)
1922	J. Mathewson Watson (Lib)	J. H. Birley (Con)	T. Dunham (Con)
1923	J. Mathewson Watson (Lib)	J. H. Birley (Con)	T. Dunham (Con)
1924	J. Mathewson Watson (Lib)	J. H. Birley (Con)	T. Dunham (Con)
1925	J. Mathewson Watson (Lib)	J. H. Birley (Con)	T. Dunham (Con)
1926	J. Mathewson Watson (Lib)	J. H. Birley (Con)	T. Dunham (Con)
1927	J. Mathewson Watson (Lib)	J. H. Birley (Con)	A. H. Weller (Land Values)
June 1928	J. Mathewson Watson (Lib)	R. Pepperdine (Con)	A. H. Weller (Land Values)
1928	J. Mathewson Watson (Lib)	R. Pepperdine (Con)	A. H. Weller (Land Values)
1929	J. Mathewson Watson (Lib)	R. Pepperdine (Con)	A. H. Weller (Land Values)
1930	J. Mathewson Watson (Lib)	R. Pepperdine (Con)	B. S. Vivante (Con)
1931	J. Mathewson Watson (Lib)	R. Pepperdine (Con)	B. S. Vivante (Con)
January 1932	J. Mathewson Watson (Lib)	R. Pepperdine (Con)	D. Gosling (Con)
1932	J. Mathewson Watson (Lib)	R. Pepperdine (Con)	D. Gosling (Con)
1933	J. Mathewson Watson (Lib)	R. Pepperdine (Con)	D. Gosling (Con)
January 1934	H. Quinney (Lib)	R. Pepperdine (Con)	D. Gosling (Con)
1934	H. Quinney (Lib)	S. C. Brewster (Con)	D. Gosling (Con)
1935	H. Quinney (Lib)	S. C. Brewster (Con)	D. Gosling (Con)
1936	H. Quinney (Lib)	S. C. Brewster (Con)	D. Gosling (Con)
1937	H. Quinney (Lib)	S. C. Brewster (Con)	D. Gosling (Con)
1938	H. Quinney (Lib)	S. C. Brewster (Con)	D. Gosling (Con)
1945	H. Quinney (Lib)	S. C. Brewster (Con)	N. G. Atkinson (Lab)
March 1946	H. Quinney (Lab)	S. C. Brewster (Con)	N. G. Atkinson (Lab)
1946	H. Quinney (Lab)	S. C. Brewster (Con)	N. G. Atkinson (Lab)
1947	R. H. W. Owen (Con)	S. C. Brewster (Con)	N. G. Atkinson (Lab)
1949	R. H. W. Owen (Con)	S. C. Brewster (Con)	W. H. Cox (Con)
1950	R. H. W. Owen (Con)	S. C. Brewster (Con)	W. H. Cox (Con)
1951	A. Smith (Con)	S. C. Brewster (Con)	W. H. Cox (Con)
1952	A. Smith (Con)	S. C. Brewster (Con)	H. Collins (Lab)
1953	A. Smith (Con)	B. Lawson (Lab)	H. Collins (Lab)
1954	K. Pollitt (Lab)	B. Lawson (Lab)	H. Collins (Lab)
1955	K. Pollitt (Lab)	B. Lawson (Lab)	P. Buckley (Con)
1956	K. Pollitt (Lab)	B. Lawson (Lab)	P. Buckley (Con)
1957	L. Lescure (Con)	B. Lawson (Lab)	P. Buckley (Con)
1958	L. Lescure (Con)	B. Lawson (Lab)	P. Buckley (Con)
1959	L. Lescure (Con)	J. Bodden (Con)	P. Buckley (Con)
1960	W. H. Cox (Con)	J. Bodden (Con)	P. Buckley (Con)
1961	W. H. Cox (Con)	J. Bodden (Con)	P. Buckley (Con)
1962	W. H. Cox (Con)	S. D. Alexander (Con)	P. Buckley (Con)
1963	A. H. Burlin (Con)	S. D. Alexander (Con)	P. Buckley (Con)
1964	A. H. Burlin (Con)	S. D. Alexander (Con)	P. Buckley (Con)
1965	A. H. Burlin (Con)	S. D. Alexander (Con)	P. Buckley (Con)
1966	A. H. Burlin (Con)	S. D. Alexander (Con)	P. Buckley (Con)
1967	A. H. Burlin (Con)	S. D. Alexander (Con)	J. Pollitt (Con)
1968	A. H. Burlin (Con)	S. D. Alexander (Con)	J. Pollitt (Con)
1969	A. H. Burlin (Con)	S. D. Alexander (Con)	J. Pollitt (Con)
1970	A. H. Burlin (Con)	S. D. Alexander (Con)	J. Pollitt (Con)

== Elections ==
=== Elections in 1900s ===
==== November 1904 ====
1904 (3 vacancies)
Party	Candidate	Votes	%	±%
Independent	A. Grierson	1,144	70.4	
Liberal	T. Herbert	826	50.8	
Liberal	W. Hynes	817	50.3	
Labour	J. Archer	776	47.8	
Conservative	J. H. Swales	695	42.8	
Liberal	J. Livesley	617	38.0	
Majority		41	2.5	
Turnout		1,625		
Independent win (new seat)				
Liberal win (new seat)				
Liberal win (new seat)				

==== November 1905 ====
1905
Party	Candidate	Votes	%	±%
Liberal	W. Hynes*	755	45.3	−5.5
Conservative	A. Gresty	637	38.2	−4.6
Labour	A. Ogden	275	16.5	−31.3
Majority		118	7.1	+4.6
Turnout		1,667		
Liberal hold		Swing		

==== November 1906 ====
1906
Party	Candidate	Votes	%	±%
Liberal	T. Herbert*	uncontested		
Liberal hold		Swing		

==== April 1907 (by-election) ====
By-election: 26 April 1907
Party	Candidate	Votes	%	±%
Conservative	W. Flanagan	940	52.4	N/A
Liberal	A. Porter	699	39.0	N/A
Labour	R. Robinson	154	8.6	N/A
Majority		241	13.4	N/A
Turnout		1,793		
Conservative gain from Liberal		Swing		

==== November 1907 ====
1907
Party	Candidate	Votes	%	±%
Liberal	A. Grierson*	uncontested		
Liberal hold		Swing		

==== November 1908 ====
1908
Party	Candidate	Votes	%	±%
Liberal	W. Rowlands	963	50.6	N/A
Conservative	J. W. J. Cremlyn	941	49.4	N/A
Majority		22	1.2	N/A
Turnout		1,904		
Liberal hold		Swing		

==== November 1909 ====
1909
Party	Candidate	Votes	%	±%
Conservative	W. Flanagan*	uncontested		
Conservative hold		Swing		

=== Elections in 1910s ===
==== November 1910 ====
1910
Party	Candidate	Votes	%	±%
Conservative	J. H. Birley*	uncontested		
Conservative hold		Swing		

==== November 1911 ====
1911
Party	Candidate	Votes	%	±%
Liberal	W. Rowlands*	769	61.1	N/A
Conservative	W. Stanway	489	38.9	N/A
Majority		280	22.2	N/A
Turnout		1,258		
Liberal hold		Swing		

==== November 1912 ====
1912
Party	Candidate	Votes	%	±%
Conservative	W. Flanagan*	uncontested		
Conservative hold		Swing		

==== November 1913 ====
1913
Party	Candidate	Votes	%	±%
Liberal	J. Mathewson Watson	1,077	51.8	N/A
Conservative	J. H. Birley*	1,002	48.2	N/A
Majority		75	3.6	N/A
Turnout		2,079		
Liberal gain from Conservative		Swing		

==== October 1914 (by-election) ====
By-election: 12 October 1914
Party	Candidate	Votes	%	±%
Conservative	J. H. Birley	uncontested		
Conservative hold		Swing		

==== November 1914 ====
1914
Party	Candidate	Votes	%	±%
Liberal	W. Rowlands*	uncontested		
Liberal hold		Swing		

==== November 1919 ====
1919 (new boundaries)
Party	Candidate	Votes	%	±%
Conservative	J. H. Birley*	uncontested		
Conservative hold		Swing		

=== Elections in 1920s ===
==== November 1920 ====
1920
Party	Candidate	Votes	%	±%
Liberal	J. Mathewson Watson*	3,326	70.3	N/A
Conservative	P. Sims	1,408	29.7	N/A
Majority		1,918	40.6	
Turnout		4,734	41.3	N/A
Liberal hold		Swing		

==== November 1921 ====
1921
Party	Candidate	Votes	%	±%
Conservative	T. Dunham	2,600	50.8	+21.1
Independent	J. S. Whitehead	2,523	49.2	N/A
Majority		77	1.6	
Turnout		5,123	59.5	+18.2
Conservative gain from Liberal		Swing		

==== November 1922 ====
1922
Party	Candidate	Votes	%	±%
Conservative	J. H. Birley*	2,334	56.1	+5.3
English League for the Taxation of Land Values	A. H. Weller	1,825	43.9	N/A
Majority		509	12.2	+10.6
Turnout		4,159	48.5	−9.0
Conservative hold		Swing		

==== November 1923 ====
1923
Party	Candidate	Votes	%	±%
Liberal	J. Mathewson Watson*	uncontested		
Liberal hold		Swing		

==== November 1924 ====
1924
Party	Candidate	Votes	%	±%
Conservative	T. Dunham*	2,484	52.3	N/A
Liberal	W. H. Wood	2,268	47.7	N/A
Majority		216	4.6	N/A
Turnout		4,752		
Conservative hold		Swing		

==== November 1925 ====
1925
Party	Candidate	Votes	%	±%
Conservative	J. H. Birley*	2,511	56.0	+3.7
English League for the Taxation of Land Values	A. H. Weller	1,973	44.0	N/A
Majority		538	12.0	+7.4
Turnout		4,484	49.9	
Conservative hold		Swing		

==== November 1926 ====
1926
Party	Candidate	Votes	%	±%
Liberal	J. Mathewson Watson*	3,372	79.4	N/A
Labour	W. J. Munro	876	20.6	N/A
Majority		2,496	58.8	
Turnout		4,248	48.1	−1.8
Liberal hold		Swing		

==== November 1927 ====
1927
Party	Candidate	Votes	%	±%
English League for the Taxation of Land Values	A. H. Weller	2,015	53.2	N/A
Conservative	T. Dunham*	1,770	46.8	N/A
Majority		245	6.4	
Turnout		3,785	43.1	−5.0
English League for the Taxation of Land Values gain from Conservative		Swing		

==== June 1928 (by-election) ====
By-election: 19 June 1928
Party	Candidate	Votes	%	±%
Conservative	R. Pepperdine	1,632	58.2	+11.4
Liberal	W. T. O'Gorman	693	24.7	N/A
Labour	R. McKeon	461	16.4	N/A
Residents	A. R. Edwards	20	0.7	N/A
Majority		939	33.5	
Turnout		2,806	31.9	−11.2
Conservative hold		Swing		

==== November 1928 ====
1928
Party	Candidate	Votes	%	±%
Conservative	R. Pepperdine*	2,502	68.6	+21.8
Labour	R. McKeon	1,100	30.2	N/A
Residents	A. R. Edwards	45	1.2	N/A
Majority		1,402	38.4	
Turnout		3,647	41.6	−1.5
Conservative hold		Swing		

==== November 1929 ====
1929
Party	Candidate	Votes	%	±%
Liberal	J. Mathewson Watson*	2,349	74.8	N/A
Labour	R. McKeon	793	25.2	−5.0
Majority		1,556	49.6	
Turnout		3,142	33.7	−7.9
Liberal hold		Swing		

=== Elections in 1930s ===
==== November 1930 ====
1930
Party	Candidate	Votes	%	±%
Conservative	B. S. Vivante	1,795	46.8	N/A
English League for the Taxation of Land Values	A. H. Weller*	1,272	33.1	N/A
Labour	R. McKeon	614	16.0	−9.2
Independent	T. M. Draper	142	3.7	N/A
Residents	A. R. Edwards	16	0.4	N/A
Majority		523	13.7	
Turnout		3,839		
Conservative gain from English League for the Taxation of Land Values		Swing		

==== November 1931 ====
1931
Party	Candidate	Votes	%	±%
Conservative	R. Pepperdine*	3,427	83.6	+36.8
Labour	A. Eyres	632	15.4	−0.6
Majority		2,795	68.2	+54.5
Turnout		4,059	20.9	
Conservative hold		Swing		

==== January 1932 (by-election) ====
By-election: 19 January 1932
Party	Candidate	Votes	%	±%
Conservative	D. Gosling	1,772	55.0	−28.6
Labour	A. Eyres	859	26.7	+11.3
English League for the Taxation of Land Values	A. H. Weller	574	17.7	N/A
Residents	A. R. Edwards	18	0.6	N/A
Majority		913	28.3	−39.9
Turnout		3,223	16.6	−4.4
Conservative hold		Swing		

==== November 1932 ====
1932
Party	Candidate	Votes	%	±%
Liberal	J. Mathewson Watson*	uncontested		
Liberal hold		Swing		

==== November 1933 ====
1933
Party	Candidate	Votes	%	±%
Conservative	D. Gosling*	1,881	65.9	N/A
Labour	R. McKeon	951	33.3	N/A
Residents	G. O. Edwards	23	0.8	N/A
Majority		930	32.6	N/A
Turnout		2,855		
Conservative hold		Swing		

==== January 1934 (by-election) ====
By-election: 16 January 1934
Party	Candidate	Votes	%	±%
Liberal	H. Quinney	1,084	70.3	N/A
Labour	R. McKeon	443	28.7	−4.6
Residents	A. R. Edwards	14	1.0	+0.2
Majority		641	41.6	N/A
Turnout		1,541		
Liberal hold		Swing		

==== November 1934 ====
1934
Party	Candidate	Votes	%	±%
Conservative	S. C. Brewster	1,977	65.0	−0.9
Labour	T. Knowles	1,066	35.0	+1.7
Majority		911	30.0	−2.6
Turnout		3,043		
Conservative hold		Swing		

==== November 1935 ====
1935
Party	Candidate	Votes	%	±%
Liberal	H. Quinney*	1,887	64.6	N/A
Labour	T. Knowles	1,032	35.4	+0.4
Majority		855	29.2	
Turnout		2,919		
Liberal hold		Swing		

==== November 1936 ====
1936
Party	Candidate	Votes	%	±%
Conservative	D. Gosling*	1,991	62.7	N/A
Labour	T. Knowles	954	30.0	−5.4
Residents	A. M. Edwards	232	7.3	N/A
Majority		1,037	32.7	
Turnout		3,177		
Conservative hold		Swing		

==== November 1937 ====
1937
Party	Candidate	Votes	%	±%
Conservative	S. C. Brewster*	1,928	62.9	+0.2
Labour	T. Knowles	1,136	37.1	+7.1
Majority		792	25.8	−6.9
Turnout		3,064		
Conservative hold		Swing		

==== November 1938 ====
1938
Party	Candidate	Votes	%	±%
Liberal	H. Quinney*	1,763	60.2	N/A
Labour	E. C. Gates	925	31.6	−5.5
Residents	G. H. F. Earnshaw	240	8.2	N/A
Majority		838	28.6	
Turnout		2,928		
Liberal hold		Swing		

=== Elections in 1940s ===
==== November 1945 ====
1945
Party	Candidate	Votes	%	±%
Labour	N. G. Atkinson	2,235	45.6	+14.0
Conservative	D. Gosling*	2,055	41.9	N/A
Independent	G. J. Playford	397	8.1	N/A
Independent	A. C. Halliday	213	4.4	N/A
Majority		180	3.7	
Turnout		4,900	34.5	
Labour gain from Conservative		Swing		

==== November 1946 ====
1946
Party	Candidate	Votes	%	±%
Conservative	S. C. Brewster*	2,535	43.2	+1.3
Labour	E. Mendell	2,370	40.3	−5.3
Independent	G. J. Playford	493	8.4	+0.3
Liberal	R. Frere	476	8.1	N/A
Majority		165	2.9	
Turnout		5,874		
Conservative hold		Swing		

==== November 1947 ====
1947
Party	Candidate	Votes	%	±%
Conservative	R. H. W. Owen	4,641	57.1	+13.9
Labour	H. Quinney*	3,088	38.0	−2.3
Liberal	G. Escott	394	4.9	−3.2
Majority		1,553	19.1	+16.2
Turnout		8,123		
Conservative gain from Labour		Swing		

==== May 1949 ====
1949
Party	Candidate	Votes	%	±%
Conservative	W. H. Cox	3,310	45.4	−11.7
Labour	D. Molloy*	2,701	37.0	−1.0
Ind. Conservative	G. J Playford	719	9.9	N/A
Liberal	J. T. Chapman	567	7.8	+2.9
Majority		709	8.4	−10.7
Turnout		7,297		
Conservative gain from Labour		Swing		

=== Elections in 1950s ===
==== May 1950 ====
1950 (new boundaries)
Party	Candidate	Votes	%	±%
Conservative	S. C. Brewster*	3,230	55.1	
Labour	H. Collins	2,633	44.9	
Majority		597	10.2	
Turnout		5,863		
Conservative hold		Swing		

==== May 1951 ====
1951
Party	Candidate	Votes	%	±%
Conservative	A. Smith*	3,440	61.4	+6.3
Labour	H. Collins	2,161	38.6	−6.3
Majority		1,279	22.8	+12.6
Turnout		5,601		
Conservative hold		Swing		

==== May 1952 ====
1952
Party	Candidate	Votes	%	±%
Labour	H. Collins	3,277	51.6	+13.0
Conservative	W. H. Cox*	2,983	47.0	−14.4
Union Movement	E. J. Hamm	90	1.4	N/A
Majority		294	4.6	
Turnout		6,350		
Labour gain from Conservative		Swing		

==== May 1953 ====
1953
Party	Candidate	Votes	%	±%
Labour	B. Lawson	2,833	50.2	−1.4
Conservative	C. Brewster*	2,813	49.8	+2.8
Majority		20	0.4	−4.2
Turnout		5,646		
Labour gain from Conservative		Swing		

==== May 1954 ====
1954
Party	Candidate	Votes	%	±%
Labour	K. Pollitt	2,693	50.6	+0.4
Conservative	A. R. Smith*	2,626	49.4	−0.4
Majority		67	1.2	+0.8
Turnout		5,319		
Labour gain from Conservative		Swing		

==== May 1955 ====
1955
Party	Candidate	Votes	%	±%
Conservative	P. Buckley	3,072	60.8	+11.3
Labour	E. V. Hughes	1,979	39.2	−11.4
Majority		1,093	21.6	
Turnout		5,051		
Conservative gain from Labour		Swing		

==== May 1956 ====
1956
Party	Candidate	Votes	%	±%
Labour	B. Lawson*	2,082	45.3	+6.1
Conservative	L. Lescure	2,077	45.2	−15.6
Independent	G. J. Playford	436	9.5	N/A
Majority		5	0.1	
Turnout		4,595		
Labour hold		Swing		

==== May 1957 ====
1957
Party	Candidate	Votes	%	±%
Conservative	L. Lescure	2,242	45.8	+0.6
Labour	K. Pollitt*	2,163	44.2	−1.1
Independent	G. J. Playford	493	10.0	+0.5
Majority		79	1.6	
Turnout		4,898		
Conservative gain from Labour		Swing		

==== May 1958 ====
1958
Party	Candidate	Votes	%	±%
Conservative	P. Buckley*	2,128	48.5	+2.7
Labour	H. Conway	1,705	38.8	−5.4
Independent	G. J. Playford	458	10.4	+0.4
Union Movement	N. Kennedy	101	2.3	N/A
Majority		423	9.7	+8.1
Turnout		4,392		
Conservative hold		Swing		

==== May 1959 ====
1959
Party	Candidate	Votes	%	±%
Conservative	J. Bodden	2,885	59.0	+10.5
Labour	B. Lawson*	1,868	38.2	−0.6
Union Movement	G. A. Webb	135	2.6	+0.3
Majority		1,017	20.8	+11.1
Turnout		4,888		
Conservative gain from Labour		Swing		

=== Elections in 1960s ===
==== May 1960 ====
1960
Party	Candidate	Votes	%	±%
Conservative	W. H. Cox	1,974	55.3	−3.7
Labour	W. Gallacher	936	26.2	−12.0
Ratepayers	L. J. Howard	568	15.9	N/A
Union Movement	G. A. Webb	89	2.5	−0.1
Majority		1,038	29.1	+8.3
Turnout		3,567		
Conservative hold		Swing		

==== May 1961 ====
1961
Party	Candidate	Votes	%	±%
Conservative	P. Buckley*	1,983	49.0	−6.3
Labour	J. S. Goldstone	1,381	34.1	+7.9
Ratepayers	G. J. Playford	505	12.5	−3.4
Union Movement	G. A. Webb	178	4.4	+1.9
Majority		602	14.9	−14.2
Turnout		4,047		
Conservative hold		Swing		

==== May 1962 ====
1962
Party	Candidate	Votes	%	±%
Conservative	S. D. Alexander	1,763	42.9	−6.1
Labour	R. E. Talbot	1,208	29.4	−4.7
Liberal	M. McCann	1,048	25.5	N/A
Union Movement	G. A. Webb	94	2.2	−2.2
Majority		555	13.5	−1.4
Turnout		4,113		
Conservative hold		Swing		

==== May 1963 ====
1963
Party	Candidate	Votes	%	±%
Conservative	A. H. Burlin	1,785	40.5	−2.4
Labour	R. E. Talbot	1,446	32.8	+3.4
Liberal	M. McCann	824	18.7	−6.8
Ratepayers	G. J. Playford	242	5.5	N/A
Communist	E. Foster	83	1.9	N/A
Union Movement	G. S. Gee	24	0.6	−1.6
Majority		339	7.7	−5.8
Turnout		4,404		
Conservative hold		Swing		

==== May 1964 ====
1964
Party	Candidate	Votes	%	±%
Conservative	P. Buckley*	1,789	47.8	+7.3
Labour	R. E. Talbot	1,576	42.1	+9.3
Liberal	S. Rose	290	7.8	−10.9
Communist	E. Foster	86	2.3	+0.4
Majority		213	5.7	−2.0
Turnout		3,741		
Conservative hold		Swing		

==== May 1965 ====
1965
Party	Candidate	Votes	%	±%
Conservative	S. D. Alexander*	1,848	57.9	+10.1
Labour	R. E. Talbot	1,082	33.9	−8.2
Liberal	E. Gray	164	5.1	−2.7
Communist	E. Foster	95	3.1	+0.8
Majority		766	24.0	+18.3
Turnout		3,189		
Conservative hold		Swing		

==== May 1966 ====
1966
Party	Candidate	Votes	%	±%
Conservative	A. H. Burlin	1,804	58.6	+0.7
Labour	R. E. Talbot	1,272	41.4	+7.5
Majority		532	17.2	−6.8
Turnout		3,076		
Conservative hold		Swing		

==== May 1967 ====
1967
Party	Candidate	Votes	%	±%
Conservative	J. Pollitt	1,697	71.2	+12.6
Labour	S. N. M. Moxley	685	28.8	−12.6
Majority		1,012	42.4	+25.2
Turnout		2,382		
Conservative hold		Swing		

==== May 1968 ====
1968
Party	Candidate	Votes	%	±%
Conservative	S. D. Alexander*	1,622	76.3	+5.1
Labour	S. N. M. Moxley	329	15.5	−13.3
Liberal	L. J. Howard	176	8.3	N/A
Majority		1,293	60.8	+18.4
Turnout		2,127		
Conservative hold		Swing		

==== May 1969 ====
1969
Party	Candidate	Votes	%	±%
Conservative	A. H. Burlin*	1,773	75.4	−0.9
Labour	S. N. M. Moxley	464	19.7	+4.2
Communist	W. Woolery	113	4.8	N/A
Majority		1,309	55.7	−5.1
Turnout		2,350		
Conservative hold		Swing		

=== Elections in 1970s ===
==== May 1970 ====
1970
Party	Candidate	Votes	%	±%
Conservative	J. Pollitt*	1,477	45.3	−30.1
Labour	G. Honeyman	958	29.4	+9.7
Residents	C. Duncan	767	23.5	N/A
Communist	W. Woolery	45	1.4	−3.4
Residents	R. Davies	16	0.5	N/A
Majority		519	15.9	−39.8
Turnout		3,263		
Conservative hold		Swing		

== See also ==
- Manchester City Council
- Manchester City Council elections
