= 1922 Manchester City Council election =

Local election in Manchester

- 1 November 1922

35 of 140 seats on Manchester City Council 71 seats needed for a majority
	First party	Second party	Third party
Party	Conservative	Liberal	Labour
Last election	23 seats, 48.8%	5 seats, 14.0%	5 seats, 25.9%
Seats before	72	33	29
Seats won	15	8	10
Seats after	76	33	26
Seat change	▲4	Steady	▼3
Popular vote	48,158	9,780	44,198
Percentage	43.2%	8.8%	39.7%
Swing	▼5.6%	▼5.2%	▲13.8%
	Fourth party
Party	Independent
Last election	2 seats, 9.1%
Seats before	5
Seats won	2
Seats after	5
Seat change	Steady
Popular vote	6,657
Percentage	6.0%
Swing	▼3.1%
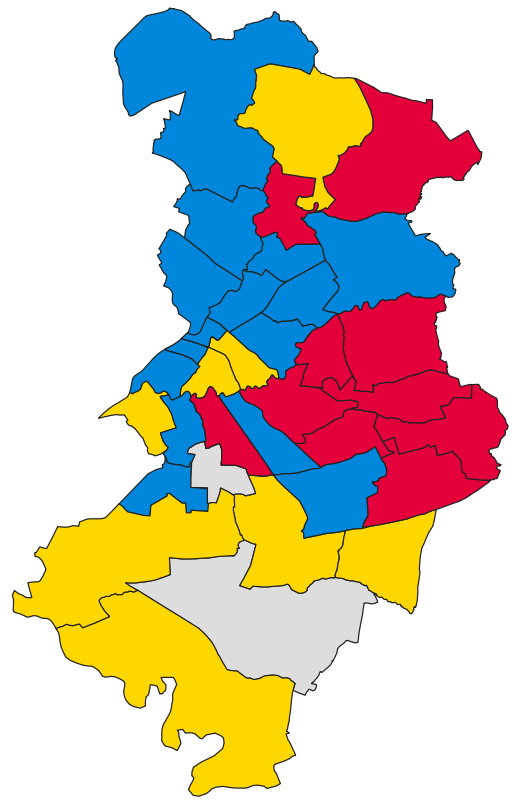
- Map of results of 1922 election
Leader of the Council before election
Conservative
Leader of the Council after election
Conservative

Elections to Manchester City Council were held on Wednesday, 1 November 1922. One third of the councillors seats were up for election, with each successful candidate to serve a three-year term of office. The Conservative Party retained overall control of the council.

== Election result ==
Party	Votes		Seats			Full Council	
Conservative Party	48,158 (43.2%)	▼5.6	15 (42.9%)	15 / 35	▲4	76 (54.3%)	76 / 140
Liberal Party	9,780 (8.8%)	▼5.2	8 (22.9%)	8 / 35	Steady	33 (23.6%)	33 / 140
Labour Party	44,198 (39.7%)	▲13.8	10 (28.6%)	10 / 35	▼3	26 (18.6%)	26 / 140
Independent	6,657 (6.0%)	▼3.1	2 (5.7%)	2 / 35	Steady	5 (3.6%)	5 / 140
English League for the Taxation of Land Values	1,825 (1.6%)	N/A	0 (0.0%)	0 / 35	N/A	0 (0.0%)	0 / 140
Independent Labour	763 (0.7%)	▼0.2	0 (0.0%)	0 / 35	▼1	0 (0.0%)	0 / 140
National Unemployed Workers' Movement	80 (0.1%)	▼0.8	0 (0.0%)	0 / 35	Steady	0 (0.0%)	0 / 140

=== Full council ===
↓
26	33	5	76

== Ward results ==
=== All Saints' ===
All Saints'
Party	Candidate	Votes	%	±%
Labour	J. E. Hutchinson*	1,841	61.3	+12.6
Independent	H. M. Ross Clyne	1,164	38.7	N/A
Majority		677	22.6	
Turnout		3,005	37.0	−3.3
Labour hold		Swing		

=== Ardwick ===
Ardwick
Party	Candidate	Votes	%	±%
Labour	H. Weate*	3,421	56.3	−8.1
Conservative	J. L. Barrett	2,650	43.7	−8.1
Majority		771	12.6	
Turnout		6,071	58.9	+10.9
Labour hold		Swing		

=== Beswick ===
Beswick
Party	Candidate	Votes	%	±%
Labour	M. E. Smith*	3,636	50.2	−7.9
Conservative	J. H. Meachin	3,604	49.8	+7.9
Majority		32	0.4	−13.8
Turnout		7,240	62.0	+8.2
Labour hold		Swing		

=== Blackley ===
Blackley
Party	Candidate	Votes	%	±%
Liberal	W. Bentley*	uncontested		
Liberal hold		Swing		

=== Bradford ===
Bradford
Party	Candidate	Votes	%	±%
Labour	J. W. Sutton*	3,336	56.9	−1.1
Conservative	G. W. Leggott	2,523	43.1	+1.1
Majority		813	13.8	−2.2
Turnout		5,859	59.3	+7.0
Labour hold		Swing		

=== Cheetham ===
Cheetham
Party	Candidate	Votes	%	±%
Conservative	C. A. Wood*	uncontested		
Conservative hold		Swing		

=== Chorlton-cum-Hardy ===
Chorlton-cum-Hardy
Party	Candidate	Votes	%	±%
Liberal	W. E. Davies*	3,500	53.1	+9.4
Conservative	A. E. Bowen	3,086	46.9	−9.4
Majority		414	6.2	
Turnout		6,586	48.4	−0.3
Liberal hold		Swing		

=== Collegiate Church ===
Collegiate Church
Party	Candidate	Votes	%	±%
Conservative	J. Elliott*	1,074	46.9	+10.4
Liberal	P. I. Wigoder	840	36.6	N/A
Labour	F. Gregson	378	16.5	N/A
Majority		234	10.2	
Turnout		2,292	66.5	−5.6
Conservative hold		Swing		

=== Collyhurst ===
Collyhurst
Party	Candidate	Votes	%	±%
Conservative	F. Brine	2,482	50.3	−8.4
Labour	M. Jagger*	2,449	49.7	N/A
Majority		33	0.6	−16.8
Turnout		4,931	54.0	−5.0
Conservative gain from Labour		Swing		

=== Crumpsall ===
Crumpsall
Party	Candidate	Votes	%	±%
Conservative	F. Todd*	uncontested		
Conservative hold		Swing		

=== Didsbury ===
Didsbury
Party	Candidate	Votes	%	±%
Liberal	E. D. Simon*	uncontested		
Liberal hold		Swing		

=== Exchange ===
Exchange
Party	Candidate	Votes	%	±%
Conservative	G. L. Hardcastle*	uncontested		
Conservative hold		Swing		

=== Gorton North ===
Gorton North
Party	Candidate	Votes	%	±%
Labour	J. Compton*	3,479	63.8	+34.7
Conservative	R. S. Ireland	1,970	36.2	−0.7
Majority		1,509	27.6	
Turnout		5,449	54.4	−6.3
Labour hold		Swing		

=== Gorton South ===
Gorton South
Party	Candidate	Votes	%	±%
Labour	A. Lee*	3,185	54.9	−3.1
Conservative	J. E. Leicester	2,617	45.1	+9.7
Majority		568	9.8	−12.8
Turnout		5,802	59.0	−3.5
Labour hold		Swing		

=== Harpurhey ===
Harpurhey
Party	Candidate	Votes	%	±%
Labour	R. Lundy*	2,287	49.2	+4.3
Conservative	E. E. Walsh	2,284	49.1	−5.1
National Unemployed Workers' Movement	P. Murphy	80	1.7	N/A
Majority		3	0.1	
Turnout		4,651	48.1	−1.1
Labour hold		Swing		

=== Levenshulme ===
Levenshulme
Party	Candidate	Votes	%	±%
Liberal	M. E. Mitchell*	uncontested		
Liberal hold		Swing		

=== Longsight ===
Longsight
Party	Candidate	Votes	%	±%
Conservative	W. Cundiff*	uncontested		
Conservative hold		Swing		

=== Medlock Street ===
Medlock Street
Party	Candidate	Votes	%	±%
Conservative	C. H. S. Redmond*	uncontested		
Conservative hold		Swing		

=== Miles Platting ===
Miles Platting
Party	Candidate	Votes	%	±%
Conservative	J. Travis	3,041	46.9	−8.8
Labour	C. E. Wood*	2,719	42.0	−2.3
Liberal	H. Pinnington	718	11.1	N/A
Majority		322	4.9	−6.5
Turnout		6,478	67.2	+5.6
Conservative gain from Labour		Swing		

=== Moss Side East ===
Moss Side East
Party	Candidate	Votes	%	±%
Independent	E. Hales*	2,437	58.8	N/A
Conservative	R. S. Banks	1,711	41.2	−9.8
Majority		728	17.6	
Turnout		4,148	53.3	+1.8
Independent hold		Swing		

=== Moss Side West ===
Moss Side West
Party	Candidate	Votes	%	±%
Conservative	J. H. Birley*	2,334	56.1	+5.3
English League for the Taxation of Land Values	A. H. Weller	1,825	43.9	N/A
Majority		509	12.2	+10.6
Turnout		4,159	48.5	−9.0
Conservative hold		Swing		

=== Moston ===
Moston
Party	Candidate	Votes	%	±%
Labour	W. R. Mellor*	2,868	62.1	+17.1
Liberal	W. Webster	1,754	37.9	N/A
Majority		1,114	24.2	
Turnout		4,622	53.2	−3.2
Labour hold		Swing		

=== New Cross ===
New Cross
Party	Candidate	Votes	%	±%
Conservative	A. Taylor*	3,457	62.3	+14.4
Labour	E. J. Hookway	2,090	37.7	N/A
Majority		1,367	24.6	
Turnout		5,547	58.5	+16.3
Conservative hold		Swing		

=== Newton Heath ===
Newton Heath
Party	Candidate	Votes	%	±%
Conservative	H. F. Robinson	2,083	43.5	N/A
Labour	H. Thorneycroft	1,938	40.5	−0.3
Independent Labour	P. L. Martin*	763	15.9	N/A
Majority		145	3.0	
Turnout		4,784	59.6	+1.6
Conservative gain from Independent Labour		Swing		

=== Openshaw ===
Openshaw
Party	Candidate	Votes	%	±%
Labour	J. Toole*	2,860	57.4	+20.4
Conservative	D. C. Goodman	2,126	42.6	−8.8
Majority		734	14.8	
Turnout		4,986	53.1	−9.4
Labour hold		Swing		

=== Oxford ===
Oxford
Party	Candidate	Votes	%	±%
Liberal	R. Noton Barclay*	uncontested		
Liberal hold		Swing		

=== Rusholme ===
Rusholme
Party	Candidate	Votes	%	±%
Liberal	E. F. M. Sutton*	2,121	91.4	+35.0
Independent	A. R. Edwards	208	8.9	N/A
Majority		1,913	82.2	+69.4
Turnout		2,329	28.7	−15.5
Liberal hold		Swing		

=== St. Ann's ===
St. Ann's
Party	Candidate	Votes	%	±%
Conservative	J. G. Litton*	uncontested		
Conservative hold		Swing		

=== St. Clement's ===
St. Clement's
Party	Candidate	Votes	%	±%
Liberal	J. H. Helm*	uncontested		
Liberal hold		Swing		

=== St. George's ===
St. George's
Party	Candidate	Votes	%	±%
Liberal	G. Oddy*	uncontested		
Liberal hold		Swing		

=== St. John's ===
St. John's
Party	Candidate	Votes	%	±%
Conservative	T. R. Hewlett	867	50.6	0
Liberal	R. E. T. Allan	847	49.4	0
Majority		20	1.2	0
Turnout		1,714	65.8	+12.5
Conservative hold		Swing		

=== St. Luke's ===
St. Luke's
Party	Candidate	Votes	%	±%
Conservative	J. Johnson*	3,275	57.1	−2.8
Labour	E. Whiteley	1,620	26.8	−16.1
Independent	G. H. Greenhough	1,140	18.9	N/A
Majority		1,655	27.4	+13.2
Turnout		6,035	60.8	+17.8
Conservative hold		Swing		

=== St. Mark's ===
St. Mark's
Party	Candidate	Votes	%	±%
Labour	G. Hall*	3,436	52.3	+5.4
Conservative	W. P. Jackson	3,134	47.7	+11.8
Majority		302	4.6	−6.4
Turnout		6,597	65.2	+8.3
Labour hold		Swing		

=== St. Michael's ===
St. Michael's
Party	Candidate	Votes	%	±%
Conservative	G. H. Dale	2,515	51.0	+1.4
Labour	J. Fogarty	2,300	46.6	−3.8
Independent	A. Walsh	116	2.4	N/A
Majority		215	4.4	
Turnout		4,931	79.0	+4.6
Conservative gain from Labour		Swing		

=== Withington ===
Withington
Party	Candidate	Votes	%	±%
Independent	L. F. Massey*	1,592	48.7	+5.1
Conservative	F. Stapleton	1,325	40.5	−15.9
Labour	M. Dean	355	10.8	N/A
Majority		267	8.2	
Turnout		3,272	48.3	+1.7
Independent hold		Swing		

== Aldermanic elections ==
=== Aldermanic elections, 9 November 1922 ===
At the meeting of the council on 9 November 1922, the terms of office of eighteen aldermen expired.

The following eighteen were elected as aldermen by the council on 9 November 1922 for a term of six years.

Party	Alderman	Ward	Term expires
Liberal	T. C. Abbott*	St. Ann's	1928
Conservative	G. K. Ashton*	Ardwick	1928
Liberal	Charles Behrens*	Oxford	1928
Conservative	R. A. D. Carter*	Levenshulme	1928
Conservative	A. W. Chapman*	Medlock Street	1928
Conservative	William Thomas Dagnall*	St. Michael's	1928
Conservative	Harry Derwent-Simpson*	Beswick	1928
Conservative	Samuel Dixon*	Moston	1928
Liberal	John Frowde*	Moss Side West	1928
Labour	James Johnston*	St. John's	1928
Conservative	John Jones*	Longsight	1928
Conservative	Sir Thomas Thornhill Shann*		1928
Conservative	Thomas Smethurst*	Cheetham	1928
Conservative	John R. Smith*	Collegiate Church	1928
Conservative	Thomas Turnbull*	Withington	1928
Conservative	Robert Turner*	St. Mark's	1928
Liberal	William Walker*	Gorton South	1928
Conservative	Thomas Watmough*	Exchange	1928

Caused by the resignation on 3 November 1922 of Alderman William Birkbeck (Liberal, elected as an alderman by the council on 5 December 1900).

In his place, Councillor Frederick Todd (Conservative, Crumpsall, elected 21 July 1905) was elected as an alderman by the council on 9 November 1922.

Party	Alderman	Ward	Term expires
Conservative	Frederick Todd	New Cross	1925

=== Aldermanic election, 6 December 1922 ===
Caused by the resignation on 29 November 1922 of Alderman Sir Thomas Smethurst (Conservative, elected as an alderman by the council on 5 January 1910).

In his place, Councillor C. A. Wood (Conservative, Cheetham, elected 1 November 1906) was elected as an alderman by the council on 6 December 1922.

Party	Alderman	Ward	Term expires
Conservative	C. A. Wood	Cheetham	1928

=== Aldermanic election, 7 February 1923 ===
Caused by the death on 27 January 1923 of Alderman John Frowde (Liberal, elected as an alderman by the council on 9 November 1904).

In his place, Councillor James Henry Swales (Conservative, St. George's, elected 1 November 1906) was elected as an alderman by the council on 7 February 1923.

Party	Alderman	Ward	Term expires
Conservative	James Henry Swales	Moss Side West	1925

=== Aldermanic election, 1 August 1923 ===
Caused by the death on 15 July 1923 of Alderman Sir Thomas Thornhill Shann (Conservative, elected as an alderman by the council on 9 November 1911).

In his place, Councillor James Johnson (Conservative, St. Luke's, elected 1 November 1906) was elected as an alderman by the council on 1 August 1923.

Party	Alderman	Ward	Term expires
Conservative	James Johnson	Oxford	1928

== By-elections between 1922 and 1923 ==
=== Crumpsall, 2 December 1922 ===
Caused by the election as an alderman of Councillor Frederick Todd (Conservative, Crumpsall, elected 21 July 1905) on 9 November 1922 following the resignation on 3 November 1922 of Alderman William Birkbeck (Liberal, elected as an alderman by the council on 5 December 1900).

Crumpsall
Party	Candidate	Votes	%	±%
Conservative	W. Dennison	1,224	43.1	N/A
Liberal	E. H. Wagon	1,043	36.7	N/A
Labour	C. Stott	572	20.2	N/A
Majority		181	6.4	N/A
Turnout		2,839		
Conservative hold		Swing		

=== Cheetham, 19 December 1922 ===
Caused by the election as an alderman of Councillor C. A. Wood (Conservative, Cheetham, elected 1 November 1906) on 6 December 1922 following the resignation on 29 November 1922 of Alderman Sir Thomas Smethurst (Conservative, elected as an alderman by the council on 5 January 1910).

Cheetham
Party	Candidate	Votes	%	±%
Conservative	J. C. Kidd	1,707	59.3	N/A
Labour	E. J. Hookway	1,173	40.7	N/A
Majority		5344	18.6	N/A
Turnout		2,880		
Conservative hold		Swing		

=== St. George's, 12 February 1923 ===
Caused by the election as an alderman of Councillor James Henry Swales (Conservative, St. George's, elected 19 September 1910; previously 1906-09) on 7 February 1923 following the death on 27 January 1923 of Alderman John Frowde (Liberal, elected as an alderman by the council on 9 November 1904).

St. George's
Party	Candidate	Votes	%	±%
Conservative	C. Maxwell	uncontested		
Conservative hold		Swing		

=== St. Luke's, 15 August 1923 ===
Caused by the election as an alderman of Councillor James Johnson (Conservative, St. Luke's, elected 1 November 1906) on 1 August 1923 following the death on 15 July 1923 of Alderman Sir Thomas Thornhill Shann (Conservative, elected as an alderman by the council on 9 November 1911).

St. Luke's
Party	Candidate	Votes	%	±%
Liberal	T. R. Ackroyd	2,232	55.4	N/A
Conservative	J. W. Higginbottom	1,138	28.2	−28.9
Co-operative Party	E. Whiteley	660	16.4	N/A
Majority		1,094	27.2	
Turnout		4,030		
Liberal gain from Conservative		Swing		

=== Withington, 24 August 1923 ===
Caused by the death of Councillor J. C. Jones (Liberal, Withington, elected 1 November 1913) on 7 August 1923.

Withington
Party	Candidate	Votes	%	±%
Liberal	W. A. Lewins	1,165	51.6	N/A
Conservative	K. W. Chambers	1,091	48.4	+7.9
Majority		74	3.2	
Turnout		2,256		
Liberal hold		Swing		
