= 1931 Manchester City Council election =

Local election in Manchester

- 2 November 1931

35 of 144 seats on Manchester City Council 73 seats needed for a majority
| | First party | Second party | Third party |
|---|---|---|---|
| Party | Conservative | Labour | Liberal |
| Last election | 18 seats, 42.1% | 11 seats, 34.4% | 5 seats, 19.6% |
| Seats before | 62 | 51 | 28 |
| Seats won | 21 | 7 | 7 |
| Seats after | 71 | 43 | 28 |
| Seat change | ▲9 | ▼7 | Steady |
| Popular vote | 63,284 | 48,549 | 12,384 |
| Percentage | 50.0% | 38.4% | 9.8% |
| Swing | ▲7.9% | ▲4.0% | ▼9.8% |
| | Fourth party |
| Party | Independent |
| Last election | 1 seats, 2.3% |
| Seats before | 3 |
| Seats won | 0 |
| Seats after | 2 |
| Seat change | ▼1 |
| Popular vote | 0 |
| Percentage | 0.0% |
| Swing | ▼2.3% |
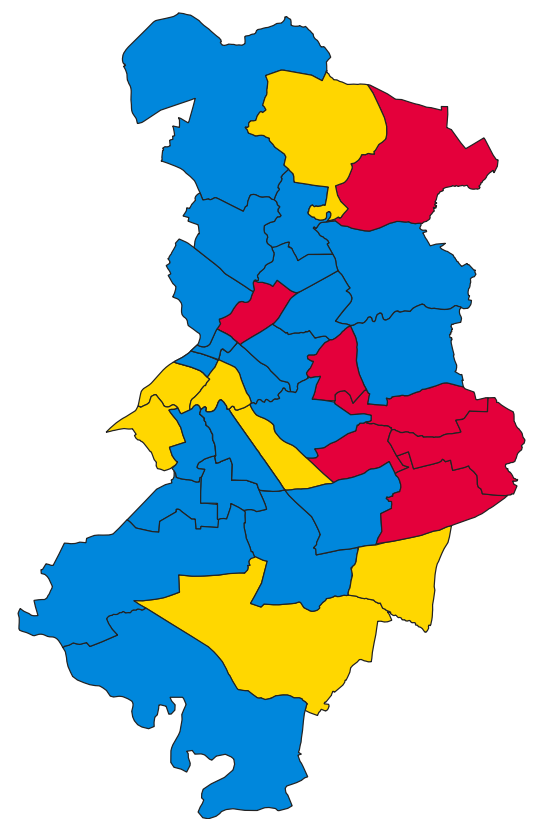
- Map of results of 1931 election
Leader of the Council before election
No overall control
Leader of the Council after election
No overall control

Elections to Manchester City Council were held on Monday, 2 November 1931. One third of the councillors seats were up for election, with each successful candidate to serve a three-year term of office. The council remained under no overall control.

== Election result ==
| Party | Votes | | Seats | | | Full Council | |
| Conservative Party | 63,284 (50.0%) | ▲7.9 | 21 (60.0%) | 21 / 35 | ▲9 | 71 (49.3%) | 71 / 144 |
| Labour Party | 48,549 (38.4%) | ▲4.0 | 7 (20.0%) | 7 / 35 | ▼7 | 43 (29.9%) | 43 / 144 |
| Liberal Party | 12,384 (9.8%) | ▼9.8 | 7 (20.0%) | 7 / 35 | Steady | 28 (19.4%) | 28 / 144 |
| Independent | 0 (0.0%) | ▼2.3 | 0 (0.0%) | 0 / 35 | ▼1 | 2 (1.4%) | 2 / 144 |
| Independent Labour Party | 1,662 (1.3%) | ▲1.3 | 0 (0.0%) | 0 / 35 | ▼1 | 0 (0.0%) | 0 / 144 |
| Residents | 368 (0.3%) | ▲0.2 | 0 (0.0%) | 0 / 35 | Steady | 0 (0.0%) | 0 / 144 |
| Communist | 261 (0.2%) | ▲0.1 | 0 (0.0%) | 0 / 35 | Steady | 0 (0.0%) | 0 / 144 |

=== Full council ===
↓
| 43 | 28 | 2 | 71 |

=== Aldermen ===
↓
| 5 | 9 | 1 | 21 |

=== Councillors ===
↓
| 38 | 19 | 1 | 50 |

== Ward results ==
=== All Saints' ===
All Saints'
| Party | Candidate | Votes | % | ±% |
|---|---|---|---|---|
| Conservative | J. McMahon | 2,502 | 68.3 | +12.0 |
| Labour | A. Trench | 1,160 | 31.7 | +5.4 |
| Majority | | 1,342 | 36.6 | +6.6 |
| Turnout | | 3,662 | 41.3 | |
| Conservative gain from Labour | | Swing | | |

=== Ardwick ===
Ardwick
| Party | Candidate | Votes | % | ±% |
|---|---|---|---|---|
| Conservative | G. Grocock | 3,399 | 62.0 | −0.6 |
| Labour | W. Onions | 2,080 | 38.0 | +0.6 |
| Majority | | 1,319 | 24.0 | −1.2 |
| Turnout | | 5,479 | 50.8 | |
| Conservative gain from Labour | | Swing | | |

=== Beswick ===
Beswick
| Party | Candidate | Votes | % | ±% |
|---|---|---|---|---|
| Labour | H. Thorneycroft* | 3,902 | 52.3 | N/A |
| Conservative | W. Shaw | 3,559 | 47.7 | N/A |
| Majority | | 343 | 4.6 | N/A |
| Turnout | | 7,461 | 59.6 | |
| Labour hold | | Swing | | |

=== Blackley ===
Blackley
| Party | Candidate | Votes | % | ±% |
|---|---|---|---|---|
| Liberal | H. Lee | 3,600 | 74.4 | N/A |
| Labour | W. Collingson | 1,241 | 25.6 | −6.7 |
| Majority | | 2,359 | 48.8 | |
| Turnout | | 4,841 | 48.2 | |
| Liberal hold | | Swing | | |

=== Bradford ===
Bradford
| Party | Candidate | Votes | % | ±% |
|---|---|---|---|---|
| Conservative | F. J. Riley | 3,596 | 59.0 | +11.6 |
| Labour | R. McKeon | 2,503 | 41.0 | −11.6 |
| Majority | | 1,093 | 18.0 | |
| Turnout | | 6,099 | 53.3 | |
| Conservative gain from Labour | | Swing | | |

=== Cheetham ===
Cheetham
| Party | Candidate | Votes | % | ±% |
|---|---|---|---|---|
| Conservative | J. C. Kidd* | uncontested | | |
| Conservative hold | | Swing | | |

=== Chorlton-cum-Hardy ===
Chorlton-cum-Hardy
| Party | Candidate | Votes | % | ±% |
|---|---|---|---|---|
| Conservative | W. Somerville* | uncontested | | |
| Conservative hold | | Swing | | |

=== Collegiate Church ===
Collegiate Church
| Party | Candidate | Votes | % | ±% |
|---|---|---|---|---|
| Conservative | J. Elliott* | 1,027 | 50.2 | N/A |
| Liberal | P. Smith | 1,020 | 49.8 | +22.4 |
| Majority | | 7 | 0.4 | |
| Turnout | | 2,047 | 47.3 | |
| Conservative hold | | Swing | | |

=== Collyhurst ===
Collyhurst
| Party | Candidate | Votes | % | ±% |
|---|---|---|---|---|
| Conservative | L. E. Wilson | 3,043 | 51.2 | +1.5 |
| Labour | R. Malcolm* | 2,792 | 47.0 | −3.3 |
| Communist | S. Nuttall | 103 | 1.8 | N/A |
| Majority | | 251 | 4.2 | |
| Turnout | | 5,938 | 59.7 | |
| Conservative gain from Labour | | Swing | | |

=== Crumpsall ===
Crumpsall
| Party | Candidate | Votes | % | ±% |
|---|---|---|---|---|
| Conservative | W. Reid | 2,187 | 51.2 | 0 |
| Liberal | G. H. Harrison | 2,082 | 48.8 | +3.9 |
| Majority | | 105 | 2.4 | −3.9 |
| Turnout | | 4,269 | 54.6 | |
| Conservative gain from Liberal | | Swing | | |

=== Didsbury ===
Didsbury
| Party | Candidate | Votes | % | ±% |
|---|---|---|---|---|
| Conservative | S. P. Dawson* | uncontested | | |
| Conservative hold | | Swing | | |

=== Exchange ===
Exchange
| Party | Candidate | Votes | % | ±% |
|---|---|---|---|---|
| Conservative | G. L. Hardcastle* | uncontested | | |
| Conservative hold | | Swing | | |

=== Gorton North ===
Gorton North
| Party | Candidate | Votes | % | ±% |
|---|---|---|---|---|
| Labour | T. F. Regan* | 3,623 | 56.4 | −13.8 |
| Conservative | H. S. Birch | 2,797 | 43.6 | N/A |
| Majority | | 826 | 12.8 | −27.6 |
| Turnout | | 6,420 | 59.1 | |
| Labour hold | | Swing | | |

=== Gorton South ===
Gorton South
| Party | Candidate | Votes | % | ±% |
|---|---|---|---|---|
| Labour | A. Lee* | 3,683 | 51.9 | −1.3 |
| Conservative | E. Appleton | 3,410 | 48.1 | +1.3 |
| Majority | | 273 | 3.8 | −2.6 |
| Turnout | | 7,093 | 56.4 | |
| Labour hold | | Swing | | |

=== Harpurhey ===
Harpurhey
| Party | Candidate | Votes | % | ±% |
|---|---|---|---|---|
| Conservative | F. Sutton | 3,696 | 64.4 | +9.5 |
| Labour | E. Barnacott | 2,042 | 35.6 | −9.5 |
| Majority | | 1,654 | 28.8 | +19.0 |
| Turnout | | 5,738 | 56.1 | |
| Conservative gain from Labour | | Swing | | |

=== Levenshulme ===
Levenshulme
| Party | Candidate | Votes | % | ±% |
|---|---|---|---|---|
| Liberal | C. R. de la Wyche* | uncontested | | |
| Liberal hold | | Swing | | |

=== Longsight ===
Longsight
| Party | Candidate | Votes | % | ±% |
|---|---|---|---|---|
| Conservative | W. Cundiff* | uncontested | | |
| Conservative hold | | Swing | | |

=== Medlock Street ===
Medlock Street
| Party | Candidate | Votes | % | ±% |
|---|---|---|---|---|
| Conservative | P. T. Barnes | 3,008 | 63.5 | +18.9 |
| Labour | F. Edwards* | 1,729 | 36.5 | −18.9 |
| Majority | | 1,279 | 27.0 | |
| Turnout | | 4,737 | 37.6 | |
| Conservative gain from Labour | | Swing | | |

=== Miles Platting ===
Miles Platting
| Party | Candidate | Votes | % | ±% |
|---|---|---|---|---|
| Conservative | J. Vickers | 3,422 | 53.1 | +7.1 |
| Labour | W. Lewis | 3,023 | 46.9 | −7.1 |
| Majority | | 399 | 6.2 | |
| Turnout | | 6,445 | 59.5 | |
| Conservative gain from Labour | | Swing | | |

=== Moss Side East ===
Moss Side East
| Party | Candidate | Votes | % | ±% |
|---|---|---|---|---|
| Conservative | H. Strange | 2,734 | 92.6 | +40.3 |
| Residents | A. R. Edwards | 218 | 7.4 | +7.0 |
| Majority | | 2,516 | 85.2 | +63.5 |
| Turnout | | 2,952 | 33.9 | |
| Conservative gain from Independent | | Swing | | |

=== Moss Side West ===
Moss Side West
| Party | Candidate | Votes | % | ±% |
|---|---|---|---|---|
| Conservative | R. Pepperdine* | 3,427 | 83.6 | +36.8 |
| Labour | A. Eyres | 632 | 15.4 | −0.6 |
| Majority | | 2,795 | 68.2 | +54.5 |
| Turnout | | 4,059 | 20.9 | |
| Conservative hold | | Swing | | |

=== Moston ===
Moston
| Party | Candidate | Votes | % | ±% |
|---|---|---|---|---|
| Labour | W. R. Mellor* | 3,075 | 51.6 | +18.2 |
| Conservative | J. S. O'Byrne | 2,887 | 48.4 | −6.2 |
| Majority | | 188 | 3.2 | |
| Turnout | | 5,962 | 51.2 | |
| Labour hold | | Swing | | |

=== New Cross ===
New Cross
| Party | Candidate | Votes | % | ±% |
|---|---|---|---|---|
| Conservative | S. Fitton* | 3,750 | 51.5 | +7.1 |
| Labour | L. M. Lever | 3,528 | 48.5 | −7.1 |
| Majority | | 222 | 3.0 | |
| Turnout | | 7,278 | 67.9 | |
| Conservative hold | | Swing | | |

=== Newton Heath ===
Newton Heath
| Party | Candidate | Votes | % | ±% |
|---|---|---|---|---|
| Conservative | H. F. Robinson* | 3,293 | 61.6 | +5.8 |
| Labour | J. Gorman | 2,049 | 38.4 | −5.8 |
| Majority | | 1,244 | 23.2 | +11.6 |
| Turnout | | 5,342 | 52.6 | |
| Conservative hold | | Swing | | |

=== Openshaw ===
Openshaw
| Party | Candidate | Votes | % | ±% |
|---|---|---|---|---|
| Labour | J. Toole* | 3,119 | 54.2 | −12.4 |
| Conservative | J. Campbell | 2,479 | 43.1 | N/A |
| Communist | A. Jackson | 158 | 2.7 | +0.6 |
| Majority | | 640 | 11.1 | −24.2 |
| Turnout | | 5,756 | 56.8 | |
| Labour hold | | Swing | | |

=== Oxford ===
Oxford
| Party | Candidate | Votes | % | ±% |
|---|---|---|---|---|
| Liberal | R. Noton Barclay* | uncontested | | |
| Liberal hold | | Swing | | |

=== Rusholme ===
Rusholme
| Party | Candidate | Votes | % | ±% |
|---|---|---|---|---|
| Conservative | F. A. Jackson* | 3,119 | 95.4 | +50.9 |
| Residents | A. M. Edwards | 150 | 4.6 | +2.9 |
| Majority | | 2,969 | 90.8 | |
| Turnout | | 3,269 | 31.8 | |
| Conservative hold | | Swing | | |

=== St. Ann's ===
St. Ann's
| Party | Candidate | Votes | % | ±% |
|---|---|---|---|---|
| Conservative | E. Green* | uncontested | | |
| Conservative hold | | Swing | | |

=== St. Clement's ===
St. Clement's
| Party | Candidate | Votes | % | ±% |
|---|---|---|---|---|
| Conservative | H. D. Judson* | 1,057 | 58.0 | +26.9 |
| Labour | A. Lees | 765 | 42.0 | +16.3 |
| Majority | | 292 | 16.0 | |
| Turnout | | 1,822 | 55.1 | |
| Conservative hold | | Swing | | |

=== St. George's ===
St. George's
| Party | Candidate | Votes | % | ±% |
|---|---|---|---|---|
| Liberal | A. Todd | 2,446 | 44.9 | N/A |
| Ind. Labour Party | E. Hope* | 1,662 | 30.5 | N/A |
| Labour | L. Corcoran | 1,341 | 24.6 | −16.0 |
| Majority | | 784 | 14.4 | |
| Turnout | | 5,449 | 43.2 | |
| Liberal gain from Ind. Labour Party | | Swing | | |

=== St. John's ===
St. John's
| Party | Candidate | Votes | % | ±% |
|---|---|---|---|---|
| Liberal | F. E. Tylecote* | uncontested | | |
| Liberal hold | | Swing | | |

=== St. Luke's ===
St. Luke's
| Party | Candidate | Votes | % | ±% |
|---|---|---|---|---|
| Liberal | T. R. Ackroyd* | 3,236 | 78.4 | N/A |
| Labour | E. Davies | 892 | 21.6 | −14.7 |
| Majority | | 2,344 | 56.8 | |
| Turnout | | 4,128 | 20.2 | |
| Liberal hold | | Swing | | |

=== St. Mark's ===
St. Mark's
| Party | Candidate | Votes | % | ±% |
|---|---|---|---|---|
| Labour | G. Hall* | 3,177 | 50.6 | −7.1 |
| Conservative | G. Moores | 3,102 | 49.4 | +7.1 |
| Majority | | 75 | 1.2 | −14.2 |
| Turnout | | 6,279 | 58.3 | |
| Labour hold | | Swing | | |

=== St. Michael's ===
St. Michael's
| Party | Candidate | Votes | % | ±% |
|---|---|---|---|---|
| Labour | A. Cathcart* | 2,238 | 55.6 | N/A |
| Conservative | T. Smith | 1,790 | 44.4 | N/A |
| Majority | | 448 | 11.2 | N/A |
| Turnout | | 4,028 | 58.3 | |
| Labour hold | | Swing | | |

=== Withington ===
Withington
| Party | Candidate | Votes | % | ±% |
|---|---|---|---|---|
| Liberal | T. H. Davis* | uncontested | | |
| Liberal hold | | Swing | | |

== Aldermanic elections ==
=== Aldermanic election, 2 March 1932 ===
Caused by the death on 12 February 1932 of Alderman James Bowes (Liberal, elected as an alderman by the council on 28 October 1903).

In his place, Councillor Joseph Crookes Grime (Conservative, Exchange, elected 7 July 1927, previously 1911-26) was elected as an alderman by the council on 2 March 1932.

| Party | Alderman | Ward | Term expires |
|---|---|---|---|
| Conservative | Joseph Crookes Grime | Miles Platting | 1937 |

== By-elections between 1931 and 1932 ==
=== Exchange, 10 November 1931 ===
Caused by the election as an alderman of Councillor Colonel George Westcott (Conservative, Exchange, elected 1 November 1911) on 29 October 1931, following the death on 16 October 1931 of Alderman John James Kendall (Liberal, elected as an alderman by the council on 24 June 1927).

Exchange
| Party | Candidate | Votes | % | ±% |
|---|---|---|---|---|
| Conservative | C. F. Terry* | uncontested | | |
| Conservative hold | | Swing | | |

=== St. Clement's, 24 November 1931 ===
Caused by the election as an alderman of Councillor H. D. Judson (Conservative, St. Clements's, elected 2 November 1925, previously 1911-24) on 29 October 1931, following the death on 8 October 1931 of Alderman James Johnson (Conservative, elected as an alderman by the council on 1 August 1923).

St. Clement's
| Party | Candidate | Votes | % | ±% |
|---|---|---|---|---|
| Conservative | P. C. Parker | 761 | 37.3 | −20.7 |
| Liberal | J. E. Fitzsimons | 693 | 34.0 | N/A |
| Labour | A. Lees | 584 | 28.7 | −13.3 |
| Majority | | 68 | 3.3 | −12.7 |
| Turnout | | 2,038 | 61.7 | +6.6 |
| Conservative hold | | Swing | | |

=== Moss Side West, 19 January 1932 ===
Caused by the resignation of Councillor Benjamin Vivante (Conservative, Moss Side West, elected 1 November 1930) on 6 January 1932.

Moss Side West
| Party | Candidate | Votes | % | ±% |
|---|---|---|---|---|
| Conservative | D. Gosling | 1,772 | 55.0 | −28.6 |
| Labour | A. Eyres | 859 | 26.7 | +11.3 |
| English League for the Taxation of Land Values | A. H. Weller | 574 | 17.7 | N/A |
| Residents | A. R. Edwards | 18 | 0.6 | N/A |
| Majority | | 913 | 28.3 | −39.9 |
| Turnout | | 3,223 | 16.6 | −4.4 |
| Conservative hold | | Swing | | |

=== Harpurhey, 2 February 1932 ===
Caused by the death of Councillor Fraser Sutton (Conservative, Moss Side West, elected 2 November 1931) on 12 January 1932.

Harpurhey
| Party | Candidate | Votes | % | ±% |
|---|---|---|---|---|
| Conservative | E. Shields | 2,592 | 60.2 | −4.2 |
| Labour | E. Barnacott | 1,714 | 39.8 | +4.2 |
| Majority | | 878 | 20.4 | −8.4 |
| Turnout | | 4,306 | 42.1 | −14.0 |
| Conservative hold | | Swing | | |

=== Blackley, 1 March 1932 ===
Caused by the death of Councillor James Edward Littler (Conservative, Blackley, elected 1 November 1921) on 11 February 1932.

Blackley
| Party | Candidate | Votes | % | ±% |
|---|---|---|---|---|
| Conservative | W. Makinson | 1,834 | 71.1 | N/A |
| Labour | W. Collingson | 745 | 28.9 | +3.3 |
| Majority | | 1,089 | 42.2 | |
| Turnout | | 2,579 | 25.7 | −22.5 |
| Conservative hold | | Swing | | |

=== Cheetham, 15 March 1932 ===
Caused by the election as an alderman of Councillor Joseph Crookes Grime (Conservative, Cheetham, elected 7 July 1927, previously 1911-26) on 2 March 1932 following the death on 12 February 1932 of Alderman James Bowes (Liberal, elected as an alderman by the council on 28 October 1903).

Cheetham
| Party | Candidate | Votes | % | ±% |
|---|---|---|---|---|
| Conservative | H. Lomax | 1,460 | 62.4 | N/A |
| Labour | M. Tyler | 879 | 37.6 | N/A |
| Majority | | 581 | 24.8 | N/A |
| Turnout | | 2,339 | | |
| Conservative hold | | Swing | | |
