= 1927 Manchester City Council election =

Local election in Manchester

- 1 November 1927

35 of 140 seats on Manchester City Council 71 seats needed for a majority
	First party	Second party	Third party
Party	Conservative	Labour	Liberal
Last election	12 seats, 40.1%	17 seats, 42.2%	5 seats, 16.9%
Seats before	69	41	27
Seats won	14	13	6
Seats after	66	45	25
Seat change	▼3	▲4	▼2
Popular vote	43,950	36,903	27,719
Percentage	38.6%	32.4%	24.3%
Swing	▼1.5%	▼9.8%	▲7.4%
	Fourth party
Party	Independent
Last election	1 seats, 0.0%
Seats before	3
Seats won	1
Seats after	3
Seat change	Steady
Popular vote	2,675
Percentage	2.3%
Swing	▲2.3%
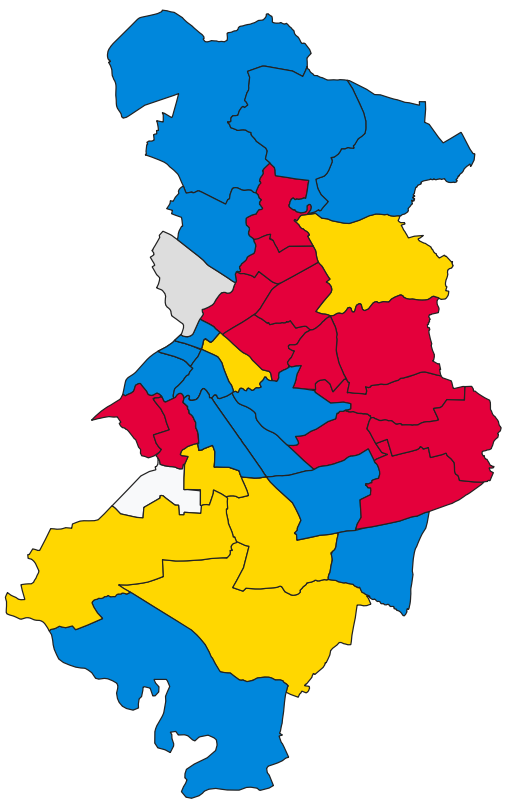
- Map of results of 1927 election
Leader of the Council before election
No overall control
Leader of the Council after election
No overall control

Elections to Manchester City Council were held on Tuesday, 1 November 1927. One third of the councillors seats were up for election, with each successful candidate to serve a three-year term of office. The council remained under no overall control.

== Election result ==
Party	Votes		Seats			Full Council	
Conservative Party	43,950 (38.6%)	▼1.5	14 (40.0%)	14 / 35	▼6	66 (47.2%)	66 / 140
Labour Party	36,903 (32.4%)	▼9.8	13 (37.1%)	13 / 35	▲4	45 (32.1%)	45 / 140
Liberal Party	27,719 (24.3%)	▲7.4	6 (17.1%)	6 / 35	▼2	25 (17.9%)	25 / 140
Independent	2,675 (2.3%)	▲2.3	1 (2.9%)	1 / 35	Steady	3 (2.1%)	3 / 140
English League for the Taxation of Land Values	2,015 (1.8%)	N/A	1 (2.9%)	1 / 35	▲1	1 (0.7%)	1 / 140
Prohibitionist	293 (0.3%)	▲0.2	0 (0.0%)	0 / 35	Steady	0 (0.0%)	0 / 140
Communist	216 (0.2%)	N/A	0 (0.0%)	0 / 35	N/A	0 (0.0%)	0 / 140
Residents	173 (0.2%)	▲0.1	0 (0.0%)	0 / 35	Steady	0 (0.0%)	0 / 140

=== Full council ===
↓
45	25	1	3	66

== Ward results ==
=== All Saints' ===
All Saints'
Party	Candidate	Votes	%	±%
Conservative	W. Davies*	1,725	47.2	+4.0
Labour	J. H. Green	1,047	28.6	−28.2
Liberal	B. McManus	845	23.1	N/A
Residents	A. R. Edwards	40	1.1	N/A
Majority		678	18.6	
Turnout		3,657	43.5	+9.5
Conservative hold		Swing		

=== Ardwick ===
Ardwick
Party	Candidate	Votes	%	±%
Conservative	M. L. K. Jones*	3,209	55.2	+7.8
Labour	W. McMullan	2,600	44.8	−7.8
Majority		609	10.4	
Turnout		5,576	56.0	+2.4
Conservative hold		Swing		

=== Beswick ===
Beswick
Party	Candidate	Votes	%	±%
Labour	L. B. Cox*	4,549	63.6	N/A
Conservative	P. Sims	2,609	36.4	N/A
Majority		1,940	27.2	N/A
Turnout		7,158	59.0	N/A
Labour hold		Swing		

=== Blackley ===
Blackley
Party	Candidate	Votes	%	±%
Conservative	J. E. Littler*	uncontested		
Conservative hold		Swing		

=== Bradford ===
Bradford
Party	Candidate	Votes	%	±%
Labour	J. Binns*	uncontested		
Labour hold		Swing		

=== Cheetham ===
Cheetham
Party	Candidate	Votes	%	±%
Conservative	A. Whitworth*	uncontested		
Conservative hold		Swing		

=== Chorlton-cum-Hardy ===
Chorlton-cum-Hardy
Party	Candidate	Votes	%	±%
Liberal	S. D. Simon*	5,978	61.3	+10.3
Conservative	C. A. Toyn	3,649	37.4	−11.6
Independent	H. Green	130	1.3	N/A
Majority		2,329	23.9	+21.9
Turnout		9,757	53.2	+10.6
Liberal hold		Swing		

=== Collegiate Church ===
Collegiate Church
Party	Candidate	Votes	%	±%
Independent	D. Gouldman*	1,659	88.5	N/A
Communist	G. W. Chandler	216	11.5	N/A
Majority		1,443	77.0	
Turnout		1,875	50.2	+4.7
Independent hold		Swing		

=== Collyhurst ===
Collyhurst
Party	Candidate	Votes	%	±%
Labour	I. Floyd*	2,990	56.8	+1.2
Conservative	C. F. Haworth	2,274	43.2	−1.2
Majority		716	13.6	+2.4
Turnout		5,264	56.0	−4.1
Labour hold		Swing		

=== Crumpsall ===
Crumpsall
Party	Candidate	Votes	%	±%
Conservative	J. Sever*	uncontested		
Conservative hold		Swing		

=== Didsbury ===
Didsbury
Party	Candidate	Votes	%	±%
Conservative	J. E. Heald*	1,877	51.1	−2.2
Liberal	H. Entwistle	1,793	48.9	+2.2
Majority		84	2.2	−4.4
Turnout		3,670	54.4	−2.7
Conservative hold		Swing		

=== Exchange ===
Exchange
Party	Candidate	Votes	%	±%
Conservative	G. Westcott*	uncontested		
Conservative hold		Swing		

=== Gorton North ===
Gorton North
Party	Candidate	Votes	%	±%
Labour	T. Walker*	uncontested		
Labour hold		Swing		

=== Gorton South ===
Gorton South
Party	Candidate	Votes	%	±%
Labour	J. Brown*	3,365	66.5	+5.5
Liberal	J. H. Stopford	1,694	33.5	N/A
Majority		1,671	33.0	+11.0
Turnout		5,059	46.4	−10.4
Labour hold		Swing		

=== Harpurhey ===
Harpurhey
Party	Candidate	Votes	%	±%
Labour	W. Onions	2,670	51.3	+0.1
Conservative	W. Gilgryst*	2,532	48.7	−0.1
Majority		138	2.6	+0.2
Turnout		5,202	52.5	−2.7
Labour gain from Conservative		Swing		

=== Levenshulme ===
Levenshulme
Party	Candidate	Votes	%	±%
Conservative	R. S. Harper*	uncontested		
Conservative hold		Swing		

=== Longsight ===
Longsight
Party	Candidate	Votes	%	±%
Conservative	J. H. Meachin*	2,713	63.9	+5.3
Liberal	G. Jennison	1,533	36.1	N/A
Majority		1,180	27.8	+10.6
Turnout		4,246	40.9	−15.9
Conservative hold		Swing		

=== Medlock Street ===
Medlock Street
Party	Candidate	Votes	%	±%
Labour	E. L. Jones	3,209	63.3	+8.8
Conservative	S. Holden Wood*	1,809	35.7	+1.2
Independent	P. J. Brett	48	1.0	N/A
Majority		1,400	27.6	+7.6
Turnout		5,066	42.7	−0.4
Labour gain from Conservative		Swing		

=== Miles Platting ===
Miles Platting
Party	Candidate	Votes	%	±%
Labour	C. E. Wood	3,667	55.6	−5.4
Conservative	S. Bloor*	2,933	44.4	+5.4
Majority		734	11.2	−10.8
Turnout		6,600	64.4	−1.2
Labour gain from Conservative		Swing		

=== Moss Side East ===
Moss Side East
Party	Candidate	Votes	%	±%
Liberal	J. B. Zimmern*	2,203	59.3	+13.5
Conservative	H. Coe	1,402	37.7	−9.0
Residents	A. R. Edwards	113	3.0	+0.4
Majority		801	21.5	
Turnout		3,718	46.4	+5.6
Liberal hold		Swing		

=== Moss Side West ===
Moss Side West
Party	Candidate	Votes	%	±%
English League for the Taxation of Land Values	A. H. Weller	2,015	53.2	N/A
Conservative	T. Dunham*	1,770	46.8	N/A
Majority		245	6.4	
Turnout		3,785	43.1	−5.0
English League for the Taxation of Land Values gain from Conservative		Swing		

=== Moston ===
Moston
Party	Candidate	Votes	%	±%
Conservative	F. Farrington	2,057	35.7	−12.6
Labour	F. Gregson	2,023	35.1	−16.6
Liberal	G. G. Wellings*	1,684	29.2	N/A
Majority		34	0.6	
Turnout		5,764	62.8	+1.8
Conservative gain from Liberal		Swing		

=== New Cross ===
New Cross
Party	Candidate	Votes	%	±%
Labour	R. Matthews*	3,365	56.5	+4.5
Conservative	F. Earley	2,594	43.5	−3.8
Majority		771	13.0	+8.3
Turnout		5,959	58.8	−8.1
Labour hold		Swing		

=== Newton Heath ===
Newton Heath
Party	Candidate	Votes	%	±%
Liberal	C. W. Godbert*	3,179	61.1	N/A
Labour	W. N. Bayes	2,028	39.9	−18.1
Majority		1,151	22.2	
Turnout		5,207	54.9	−5.5
Liberal hold		Swing		

=== Openshaw ===
Openshaw
Party	Candidate	Votes	%	±%
Labour	J. W. Aveson*	uncontested		
Labour hold		Swing		

=== Oxford ===
Oxford
Party	Candidate	Votes	%	±%
Conservative	O. P. Lancashire*	uncontested		
Conservative hold		Swing		

=== Rusholme ===
Rusholme
Party	Candidate	Votes	%	±%
Liberal	R. G. Edwards*	2,403	52.0	N/A
Conservative	F. A. Jackson	2,222	48.0	N/A
Majority		181	4.0	N/A
Turnout		4,625	51.1	N/A
Liberal hold		Swing		

=== St. Ann's ===
St. Ann's
Party	Candidate	Votes	%	±%
Conservative	C. F. Brierley*	uncontested		
Conservative hold		Swing		

=== St. Clement's ===
St. Clement's
Party	Candidate	Votes	%	±%
Liberal	W. Melland*	1,012	49.4	+25.7
Conservative	W. Somerville	649	31.7	−8.0
Labour	G. Harrison	379	18.5	−18.0
Prohibitionist	J. Rochford	8	0.4	N/A
Majority		363	17.7	
Turnout		2,048	65.4	−1.0
Liberal hold		Swing		

=== St. George's ===
St. George's
Party	Candidate	Votes	%	±%
Labour	F. C. Mason	2,645	49.1	−8.9
Conservative	R. Taylor*	1,600	29.7	−12.3
Liberal	A. Todd	854	15.7	N/A
Prohibitionist	J. Rochford	285	5.3	N/A
Majority		1,045	19.4	+3.4
Turnout		5,384	46.6	+0.9
Labour gain from Conservative		Swing		

=== St. John's ===
St. John's
Party	Candidate	Votes	%	±%
Conservative	A. C. Gardner	744	51.9	−23.5
Liberal	W. Barton*	689	48.1	N/A
Majority		55	3.8	−47.0
Turnout		1,433	55.2	−3.2
Conservative gain from Liberal		Swing		

=== St. Luke's ===
St. Luke's
Party	Candidate	Votes	%	±%
Conservative	T. Harrison*	2,129	50.9	−3.5
Liberal	W. T. O'Gorman	1,198	28.6	−17.0
Independent	L. C. Walker	838	20.0	N/A
Residents	A. R. Edwards	20	0.5	N/A
Majority		931	22.3	+13.5
Turnout		4,185	40.4	+5.3
Conservative hold		Swing		

=== St. Mark's ===
St. Mark's
Party	Candidate	Votes	%	±%
Labour	I. Brassington*	uncontested		
Labour hold		Swing		

=== St. Michael's ===
St. Michael's
Party	Candidate	Votes	%	±%
Labour	T. Cassidy*	2,366	62.9	+8.6
Conservative	J. Phillips	1,393	37.1	+6.8
Majority		973	25.8	+1.8
Turnout		3,759	43.6	−23.8
Labour hold		Swing		

=== Withington ===
Withington
Party	Candidate	Votes	%	±%
Liberal	A. P. Simon*	2,654	56.3	+16.3
Conservative	W. Hedley	2,060	43.7	−2.1
Majority		594	12.6	
Turnout		4,714	50.0	−12.2
Liberal hold		Swing		

== Aldermanic elections ==
=== Aldermanic election, 9 November 1927 ===
Caused by the death on 22 October 1927 of Alderman Samuel Dixon (Conservative, elected as an alderman by the council on 20 January 1909).

In his place, Councillor George Oddy (Liberal, St. George's, elected 1 November 1909) was elected as an alderman by the council on 9 November 1927.

Party	Alderman	Ward	Term expires
Liberal	George Oddy	Moston	1928

=== Aldermanic election, 2 May 1928 ===
Caused by the death on 11 April 1928 of Alderman Sir Edward Holt (Conservative, elected as an alderman by the council on 5 July 1905).

In his place, Councillor John Harrison (Independent, Levenshulme, elected 1 November 1909) was elected as an alderman by the council on 2 May 1928.

Party	Alderman	Ward	Term expires
Independent	John Harrison	Crumpsall	1931

=== Aldermanic elections, 6 June 1928 ===
Caused by the death on 27 April 1928 of Alderman James Johnston (Labour, elected as an alderman by the council on 7 June 1916).

In his place, Councillor Richard Stephenson Harper (Conservative, Levenshulme, elected 24 November 1909) was elected as an alderman by the council on 6 June 1928.

Party	Alderman	Ward	Term expires
Conservative	Richard Stephenson Harper	St. John's	1928

Caused by the death on 27 April 1928 of Alderman Henry Richard Box (Conservative, elected as an alderman by the council on 9 November 1904).

In his place, Councillor J. Harold Birley (Conservative, Moss Side West, elected 12 October 1914, previously 1910-13) was elected as an alderman by the council on 6 June 1928.

Party	Alderman	Ward	Term expires
Conservative	J. Harold Birley	Moss Side East	1931

=== Aldermanic election, 4 July 1928 ===
Caused by the death on 18 June 1928 of Alderman Joseph Swarbrick (Liberal, elected as an alderman by the council on 4 May 1927).

In his place, Councillor George Frank Titt (Labour, Openshaw, elected 1 November 1910) was elected as an alderman by the council on 4 July 1928.

Party	Alderman	Ward	Term expires
Labour	George Frank Titt	Collegiate Church	1928

== By-elections between 1927 and 1928 ==
=== St. George's, 22 November 1927 ===
Caused by the election as an alderman of Councillor George Oddy (Liberal, St. George's, elected 1 November 1909) on 9 November 1909, following the death on 22 October 1927 of Alderman Samuel Dixon (Conservative, elected as an alderman by the council on 26 January 1909).

St. George's
Party	Candidate	Votes	%	±%
Labour	E. Hope	2,579	54.7	+5.6
Conservative	S. Bloor	1,524	32.3	+2.6
Liberal	S. Needoff	579	12.3	−3.4
Residents	A. R. Edwards	29	0.6	N/A
Majority		1,055	22.4	+3.0
Turnout		4,711	40.7	−6.9
Labour gain from Liberal		Swing		

=== Moss Side East, 29 November 1927 ===
Caused by the death of Councillor S. B. Watts (Conservative, Moss Side East, elected 1 November 1926) on 12 November 1927.

Moss Side East
Party	Candidate	Votes	%	±%
Liberal	W. Barton	1,486	37.9	−21.4
Conservative	A. E. B. Alexander	1,273	32.5	−5.2
Labour Co-op	T. Anderson	1,132	28.9	N/A
Residents	A. R. Edwards	31	0.8	−2.2
Majority		213	5.4	−16.1
Turnout		3,922	49.0	+2.6
Liberal gain from Conservative		Swing		

=== Levenshulme, 15 May 1928 ===
Caused by the election as an alderman of Councillor John Harrison (Independent, Levenshulme, elected 1 November 1909) on 2 May 1927, following the death on 11 April 1928 of Alderman Sir Edward Holt (Conservative, elected as an alderman by the council on 5 July 1905).

Levenshulme
Party	Candidate	Votes	%	±%
Conservative	H. M. Emery	2,530	51.6	N/A
Liberal	A. Heywood	1,380	28.1	N/A
Labour	W. H. Holding	984	20.1	N/A
Residents	A. R. Edwards	12	0.2	N/A
Majority		1,150	23.5	N/A
Turnout		4,906		
Conservative gain from Independent		Swing		

=== By-elections, 19 June 1928 ===
Two by-elections were held on 19 June 1928 to fill vacancies that were created by the appointment of aldermen on 6 June 1928.

==== Levenshulme ====
Caused by the election as an alderman of Councillor Richard Stephenson Harper (Conservative, Levenshulme, elected 24 November 1909) 6 June 1928, following the death on 27 April 1928 of Alderman James Johnston (Labour, elected as an alderman by the council on 7 June 1916).

Levenshulme
Party	Candidate	Votes	%	±%
Conservative	S. R. Fairfoull	1,919	44.1	−7.5
Liberal	A. Heywood	1,685	38.7	+10.6
Labour	W. H. Holding	745	17.1	−3.0
Majority		234	5.4	−18.1
Turnout		4,349		
Conservative hold		Swing		

==== Moss Side West ====
Caused by the election as an alderman of Councillor J. Harold Birley (Conservative, Moss Side West, elected 12 October 1914, previously 1910-13) on 6 June 1928, following the death on 27 April 1928 of Alderman Henry Richard Box (Conservative, elected as an alderman by the council on 9 November 1904).

Moss Side West
Party	Candidate	Votes	%	±%
Conservative	R. Pepperdine	1,632	58.2	+11.4
Liberal	W. T. O'Gorman	693	24.7	N/A
Labour	R. McKeon	461	16.4	N/A
Residents	A. R. Edwards	20	0.7	N/A
Majority		939	33.5	
Turnout		2,806	31.9	−11.2
Conservative hold		Swing		

=== Openshaw, 17 July 1928 ===
Caused by the election as an alderman of Councillor George Frank Titt (Labour, Openshaw, elected 1 November 1910) on 4 July 1928, following the death on 18 June 1928 of Alderman Joseph Swarbrick (Liberal, elected as an alderman by the council on 4 May 1927).

Openshaw
Party	Candidate	Votes	%	±%
Labour	W. H. Oldfield	2,980	74.4	N/A
Conservative	R. S. Ireland	1,024	25.6	N/A
Majority		1,956	48.8	N/A
Turnout		4,004		
Labour hold		Swing		
