= 1933 Manchester City Council election =

Local election in Manchester

- 1 November 1933

36 of 144 seats on Manchester City Council 73 seats needed for a majority
| | First party | Second party | Third party |
|---|---|---|---|
| Party | Conservative | Labour | Liberal |
| Last election | 11 seats, 34.7% | 15 seats, 48.4% | 9 seats, 12.6% |
| Seats before | 76 | 35 | 28 |
| Seats won | 18 | 13 | 4 |
| Seats after | 74 | 39 | 27 |
| Seat change | ▼2 | ▲4 | ▼1 |
| Popular vote | 39,256 | 55,170 | 13,199 |
| Percentage | 35.3% | 49.7% | 11.9% |
| Swing | ▲0.6% | ▲1.3% | ▼0.7% |
| | Fourth party | Fifth party |
| Party | Independent | Ind. Labour Party |
| Last election | 0 seats, 0.0% | 1 seats, 2.3% |
| Seats before | 2 | 3 |
| Seats won | 1 | 0 |
| Seats after | 2 | 2 |
| Seat change | Steady | ▼1 |
| Popular vote | 2,797 | 0 |
| Percentage | 2.5% | 0.0% |
| Swing | ▲2.5% | ▼2.3% |
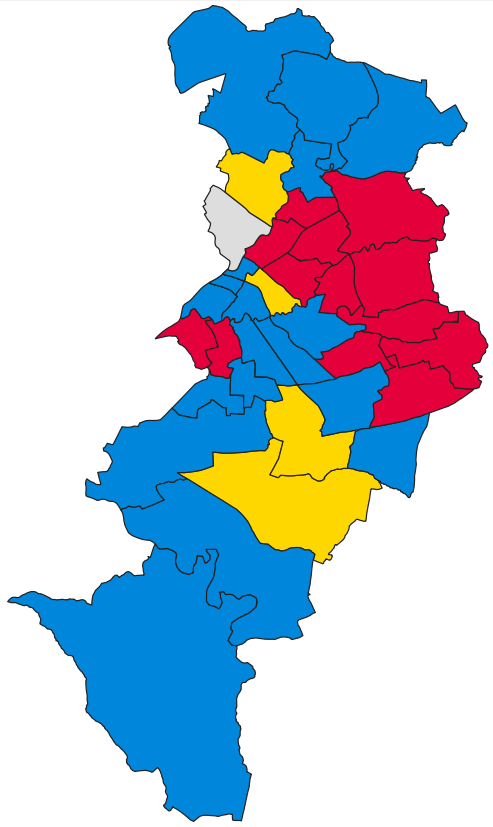
- Map of results of 1933 election
Leader of the Council before election
Conservative
Leader of the Council after election
Conservative

Elections to Manchester City Council were held on Wednesday, 1 November 1933. One third of the councillors seats were up for election, with each successful candidate to serve a three-year term of office. The Conservative Party retained overall control of the council.

== Election result ==
| Party | Votes | | Seats | | | Full Council | |
| Conservative Party | 39,256 (35.3%) | ▲0.6 | 18 (50.0%) | 18 / 36 | ▼2 | 74 (51.4%) | 74 / 144 |
| Labour Party | 55,170 (49.7%) | ▲1.3 | 13 (36.1%) | 13 / 36 | ▲4 | 39 (27.1%) | 39 / 144 |
| Liberal Party | 13,199 (11.9%) | ▼0.7 | 4 (11.1%) | 4 / 36 | ▼1 | 27 (18.8%) | 27 / 144 |
| Independent | 2,797 (2.5%) | ▲2.5 | 1 (2.8%) | 1 / 36 | Steady | 2 (1.4%) | 2 / 144 |
| Independent Labour Party | 0 (0.0%) | ▼2.3 | 0 (0.0%) | 0 / 36 | ▼1 | 2 (1.4%) | 2 / 144 |
| Communist | 490 (0.4%) | ▼0.3 | 0 (0.0%) | 0 / 36 | Steady | 0 (0.0%) | 0 / 144 |
| Residents | 164 (0.1%) | ▼0.3 | 0 (0.0%) | 0 / 36 | Steady | 0 (0.0%) | 0 / 144 |

=== Full council ===
↓
| 2 | 39 | 27 | 2 | 74 |

=== Aldermen ===
↓
| 5 | 8 | 1 | 22 |

=== Councillors ===
↓
| 2 | 34 | 19 | 1 | 52 |

== Ward results ==
=== All Saints' ===
All Saints'
| Party | Candidate | Votes | % | ±% |
|---|---|---|---|---|
| Conservative | W. Davies* | 1,419 | 50.4 | −3.2 |
| Labour | A. Lees | 1,395 | 49.6 | +3.2 |
| Majority | | 24 | 0.8 | −6.4 |
| Turnout | | 2,814 | | |
| Conservative hold | | Swing | | |

=== Ardwick ===
Ardwick
| Party | Candidate | Votes | % | ±% |
|---|---|---|---|---|
| Conservative | M. L. K. Jones* | 2,553 | 50.5 | +6.3 |
| Labour | J. T. Wolfenden | 2,506 | 49.5 | −6.3 |
| Majority | | 47 | 1.0 | |
| Turnout | | 5,059 | | |
| Conservative hold | | Swing | | |

=== Beswick ===
Beswick
| Party | Candidate | Votes | % | ±% |
|---|---|---|---|---|
| Labour | L. B. Cox* | uncontested | | |
| Labour hold | | Swing | | |

=== Blackley ===
Blackley
| Party | Candidate | Votes | % | ±% |
|---|---|---|---|---|
| Conservative | W. Makinson* | 2,202 | 57.2 | N/A |
| Labour | W. Collingson | 1,650 | 42.8 | +5.5 |
| Majority | | 552 | 14.4 | |
| Turnout | | 3,852 | | |
| Conservative hold | | Swing | | |

=== Bradford ===
Bradford
| Party | Candidate | Votes | % | ±% |
|---|---|---|---|---|
| Labour | R. Malcolm | 3,460 | 60.6 | +0.2 |
| Conservative | S. Bloor* | 2,251 | 39.4 | +2.3 |
| Majority | | 1,209 | 21.2 | −2.0 |
| Turnout | | 5,711 | | |
| Labour gain from Conservative | | Swing | | |

=== Cheetham ===
Cheetham
| Party | Candidate | Votes | % | ±% |
|---|---|---|---|---|
| Liberal | S. Laski* | 2,203 | 82.7 | N/A |
| Labour | H. Goldstone | 460 | 17.3 | +6.8 |
| Majority | | 1,743 | 65.4 | |
| Turnout | | 2,663 | | |
| Liberal hold | | Swing | | |

=== Chorlton-cum-Hardy ===
Chorlton-cum-Hardy
| Party | Candidate | Votes | % | ±% |
|---|---|---|---|---|
| Conservative | J. Watts | 5,400 | 55.0 | N/A |
| Liberal | S. D. Simon* | 3,273 | 33.4 | −47.4 |
| Labour | G. Reid | 1,141 | 11.6 | −7.6 |
| Majority | | 2,127 | 21.6 | |
| Turnout | | 9,814 | | |
| Conservative gain from Liberal | | Swing | | |

=== Collegiate Church ===
Collegiate Church
| Party | Candidate | Votes | % | ±% |
|---|---|---|---|---|
| Independent | D. Gouldman* | 1,604 | 84.0 | N/A |
| Labour | H. Cohen | 182 | 9.5 | −6.7 |
| Communist | M. Jenkins | 86 | 4.5 | −0.9 |
| Independent | T. A. Bardsley | 38 | 2.0 | N/A |
| Majority | | 1,422 | 74.5 | |
| Turnout | | 1,910 | | |
| Independent hold | | Swing | | |

=== Collyhurst ===
Collyhurst
| Party | Candidate | Votes | % | ±% |
|---|---|---|---|---|
| Labour | I. Floyd* | 3,409 | 62.4 | −3.2 |
| Conservative | A. Heald | 1,901 | 34.8 | +1.5 |
| Communist | G. Brown | 146 | 2.7 | +1.8 |
| Majority | | 1,508 | 27.6 | −4.5 |
| Turnout | | 5,456 | | |
| Labour hold | | Swing | | |

=== Crumpsall ===
Crumpsall
| Party | Candidate | Votes | % | ±% |
|---|---|---|---|---|
| Conservative | G. S. Grindley* | 1,693 | 46.1 | N/A |
| Liberal | Lord Stanley of Alderley | 1,286 | 35.0 | N/A |
| Labour | A. Sutcliffe | 680 | 18.5 | N/A |
| Residents | D. Wighton | 16 | 0.4 | N/A |
| Majority | | 407 | 11.1 | N/A |
| Turnout | | 3,675 | | |
| Conservative hold | | Swing | | |

=== Didsbury ===
Didsbury
| Party | Candidate | Votes | % | ±% |
|---|---|---|---|---|
| Conservative | N. Westcott* | uncontested | | |
| Conservative hold | | Swing | | |

=== Exchange ===
Exchange
| Party | Candidate | Votes | % | ±% |
|---|---|---|---|---|
| Conservative | C. F. Terry* | uncontested | | |
| Conservative hold | | Swing | | |

=== Gorton North ===
Gorton North
| Party | Candidate | Votes | % | ±% |
|---|---|---|---|---|
| Labour | T. Walker* | uncontested | | |
| Labour hold | | Swing | | |

=== Gorton South ===
Gorton South
| Party | Candidate | Votes | % | ±% |
|---|---|---|---|---|
| Labour | G. R. Leslie | 3,769 | 77.6 | +8.8 |
| Independent | E. Appleton | 1,090 | 22.4 | N/A |
| Majority | | 2,679 | 55.2 | +17.4 |
| Turnout | | 4,859 | | |
| Labour gain from Ind. Labour Party | | Swing | | |

=== Harpurhey ===
Harpurhey
| Party | Candidate | Votes | % | ±% |
|---|---|---|---|---|
| Conservative | C. F. Howarth* | 2,483 | 50.2 | +0.4 |
| Labour | E. Barnacott | 2,461 | 49.8 | −0.4 |
| Majority | | 22 | 0.4 | |
| Turnout | | 4,944 | | |
| Conservative hold | | Swing | | |

=== Levenshulme ===
Levenshulme
| Party | Candidate | Votes | % | ±% |
|---|---|---|---|---|
| Conservative | S. R. Fairfoull* | uncontested | | |
| Conservative hold | | Swing | | |

=== Longsight ===
Longsight
| Party | Candidate | Votes | % | ±% |
|---|---|---|---|---|
| Conservative | J. H. Meachin* | uncontested | | |
| Conservative hold | | Swing | | |

=== Medlock Street ===
Medlock Street
| Party | Candidate | Votes | % | ±% |
|---|---|---|---|---|
| Labour | E. L. Jones* | 2,749 | 61.9 | +12.2 |
| Conservative | C. A. Cave | 1,690 | 38.1 | −7.1 |
| Majority | | 1,059 | 23.8 | +19.3 |
| Turnout | | 4,439 | | |
| Labour hold | | Swing | | |

=== Miles Platting ===
Miles Platting
| Party | Candidate | Votes | % | ±% |
|---|---|---|---|---|
| Labour | C. E. Wood* | 3,639 | 67.0 | −0.4 |
| Conservative | R. Jackson | 1,790 | 33.0 | +0.4 |
| Majority | | 1,849 | 34.0 | −0.8 |
| Turnout | | 5,429 | | |
| Labour hold | | Swing | | |

=== Moss Side East ===
Moss Side East
| Party | Candidate | Votes | % | ±% |
|---|---|---|---|---|
| Conservative | H. A. E. Ramsden* | 1,300 | 50.4 | −4.4 |
| Labour | A. O'Donnell | 1,186 | 46.0 | +4.7 |
| Residents | A. R. Edwards | 93 | 3.6 | −0.4 |
| Majority | | 114 | 4.4 | −9.1 |
| Turnout | | 2,579 | | |
| Conservative hold | | Swing | | |

=== Moss Side West ===
Moss Side West
| Party | Candidate | Votes | % | ±% |
|---|---|---|---|---|
| Conservative | D. Gosling* | 1,881 | 65.9 | N/A |
| Labour | R. McKeon | 951 | 33.3 | N/A |
| Residents | G. O. Edwards | 23 | 0.8 | N/A |
| Majority | | 930 | 32.6 | N/A |
| Turnout | | 2,855 | | |
| Conservative hold | | Swing | | |

=== Moston ===
Moston
| Party | Candidate | Votes | % | ±% |
|---|---|---|---|---|
| Conservative | F. Farrington* | 3,001 | 52.7 | +6.8 |
| Labour | W. Onions | 2,694 | 47.3 | −6.8 |
| Majority | | 307 | 5.4 | |
| Turnout | | 5,695 | | |
| Conservative hold | | Swing | | |

=== New Cross ===
New Cross
| Party | Candidate | Votes | % | ±% |
|---|---|---|---|---|
| Labour | L. M. Lever* | 4,033 | 73.0 | +9.7 |
| Conservative | A. Crossley | 1,494 | 27.0 | −9.7 |
| Majority | | 2,539 | 46.0 | +19.4 |
| Turnout | | 5,527 | | |
| Labour hold | | Swing | | |

=== Newton Heath ===
Newton Heath
| Party | Candidate | Votes | % | ±% |
|---|---|---|---|---|
| Labour | J. Young | 2,940 | 57.2 | −3.7 |
| Conservative | L. Turner* | 2,202 | 42.8 | +3.1 |
| Majority | | 738 | 14.4 | −6.2 |
| Turnout | | 5,142 | | |
| Labour gain from Conservative | | Swing | | |

=== Openshaw ===
Openshaw
| Party | Candidate | Votes | % | ±% |
|---|---|---|---|---|
| Labour | R. Moss* | 2,726 | 91.4 | +18.0 |
| Communist | D. Ainley | 258 | 8.6 | +5.2 |
| Majority | | 2,468 | 82.8 | +32.6 |
| Turnout | | 2,984 | | |
| Labour hold | | Swing | | |

=== Oxford ===
Oxford
| Party | Candidate | Votes | % | ±% |
|---|---|---|---|---|
| Conservative | W. R. Sutton | uncontested | | |
| Conservative hold | | Swing | | |

=== Rusholme ===
Rusholme
| Party | Candidate | Votes | % | ±% |
|---|---|---|---|---|
| Liberal | R. G. Edwards* | 2,165 | 70.8 | +1.2 |
| Labour | W. J. Sharkey | 895 | 29.2 | +0.1 |
| Majority | | 1,270 | 41.6 | +1.1 |
| Turnout | | 3,060 | | |
| Liberal hold | | Swing | | |

=== St. Ann's ===
St. Ann's
| Party | Candidate | Votes | % | ±% |
|---|---|---|---|---|
| Conservative | W. Challoner* | uncontested | | |
| Conservative hold | | Swing | | |

=== St. Clement's ===
St. Clement's
| Party | Candidate | Votes | % | ±% |
|---|---|---|---|---|
| Liberal | B. McManus* | 1,105 | 55.6 | +2.8 |
| Labour | A. E. Jones | 881 | 44.4 | −2.8 |
| Majority | | 224 | 11.2 | +5.6 |
| Turnout | | 1,986 | | |
| Liberal hold | | Swing | | |

=== St. George's ===
St. George's
| Party | Candidate | Votes | % | ±% |
|---|---|---|---|---|
| Labour | C. Beamand | 2,400 | 57.5 | +3.1 |
| Conservative | A. E. Courtman | 1,675 | 40.1 | −3.4 |
| Independent | P. J. Brett | 65 | 1.6 | N/A |
| Residents | A. M. Edwards | 32 | 0.8 | N/A |
| Majority | | 725 | 17.4 | +6.5 |
| Turnout | | 4,172 | | |
| Labour gain from Conservative | | Swing | | |

=== St. John's ===
St. John's
| Party | Candidate | Votes | % | ±% |
|---|---|---|---|---|
| Conservative | J. E. Burgess* | uncontested | | |
| Conservative hold | | Swing | | |

=== St. Luke's ===
St. Luke's
| Party | Candidate | Votes | % | ±% |
|---|---|---|---|---|
| Conservative | T. Harrison* | 1,967 | 53.2 | N/A |
| Labour | W. Taylor | 1,727 | 46.8 | +3.0 |
| Majority | | 240 | 6.4 | |
| Turnout | | 3,694 | | |
| Conservative hold | | Swing | | |

=== St. Mark's ===
St. Mark's
| Party | Candidate | Votes | % | ±% |
|---|---|---|---|---|
| Labour | T. M. Larrad* | 2,975 | 70.5 | +3.1 |
| Conservative | A. E. Tillsley | 1,242 | 29.5 | −3.1 |
| Majority | | 1,733 | 41.0 | +6.2 |
| Turnout | | 4,217 | | |
| Labour hold | | Swing | | |

=== St. Michael's ===
St. Michael's
| Party | Candidate | Votes | % | ±% |
|---|---|---|---|---|
| Labour | T. Cassidy* | 2,071 | 65.1 | −3.8 |
| Conservative | G. C. Clayton | 1,112 | 34.9 | +3.8 |
| Majority | | 959 | 30.2 | −7.6 |
| Turnout | | 3,183 | | |
| Labour hold | | Swing | | |

=== Withington ===
Withington
| Party | Candidate | Votes | % | ±% |
|---|---|---|---|---|
| Liberal | A. P. Simon* | 3,167 | 59.1 | N/A |
| Labour | F. Edwards | 2,190 | 40.9 | +11.9 |
| Majority | | 977 | 18.2 | |
| Turnout | | 5,357 | | |
| Liberal hold | | Swing | | |

=== Wythenshawe ===
Wythenshawe
| Party | Candidate | Votes | % | ±% |
|---|---|---|---|---|
| Conservative | S. Lowe* | uncontested | | |
| Conservative hold | | Swing | | |

== Aldermanic elections ==
=== Aldermanic election, 3 January 1934 ===
Caused by the resignation on 3 January 1934 of Alderman F. J. West (Conservative, elected as an alderman by the council on 6 October 1920).

In his place, Councillor Sir John Mathewson Watson (Liberal, Moss Side West, elected 1 November 1913) was elected as an alderman by the council on 3 January 1934.

| Party | Alderman | Ward | Term expires |
|---|---|---|---|
| Liberal | John Mathewson Watson | Newton Heath | 1934 |

=== Aldermanic election, 4 April 1934 ===
Caused by the death on 9 March 1934 of Alderman Isaac Hinchliffe (Conservative, elected as an alderman by the council on 6 March 1929).

In his place, Councillor Thomas Stone Williams (Liberal, Blackley, elected 1 November 1920, previously 1914-19) was elected as an alderman by the council on 4 April 1934.

| Party | Alderman | Ward | Term expires |
|---|---|---|---|
| Liberal | Thomas Stone Williams | Didsbury | 1934 |

=== Aldermanic election, 4 July 1934 ===
Caused by the resignation on 17 May 1934 of Alderman G. K. Ashton (Conservative, elected as an alderman by the council on 14 June 1911).

In his place, Councillor Robert William Shepherd (Conservative, Oxford, elected 1 November 1920, previously 1916-19) was elected as an alderman by the council on 4 July 1934.

| Party | Alderman | Ward | Term expires |
|---|---|---|---|
| Conservative | Robert William Shepherd | Ardwick | 1934 |

=== Aldermanic elections, 5 September 1934 ===
Caused by the resignation on 17 July 1934 of Alderman Ashton Whitworth (Conservative, elected as an alderman by the council on 7 August 1929).

In his place, Councillor R. Noton Barclay (Liberal, Oxford, elected 18 April 1933, previously 1917-33) was elected as an alderman by the council on 5 September 1934.

| Party | Alderman | Ward | Term expires |
|---|---|---|---|
| Liberal | R. Noton Barclay | Withington | 1934 |

Caused by the death on 10 August 1934 of Alderman Tom Fox (Labour, elected as an alderman by the council on 7 May 1919).

In his place, Councillor John Elliott (Conservative, Collegiate Church, elected 6 March 1918) was elected as an alderman by the council on 5 September 1934.

| Party | Alderman | Ward | Term expires |
|---|---|---|---|
| Conservative | John Elliott | Bradford | 1937 |

== By-elections between 1933 and 1934 ==
=== Moss Side West, 16 January 1934 ===
Caused by the election as an alderman of Councillor Sir John Mathewson Watson (Liberal, Moss Side West, elected 1 November 1913) on 3 January 1934, following the resignation on 3 January 1934 of Alderman F. J. West (Conservative, elected as an alderman by the council on 6 October 1920).

Moss Side West
| Party | Candidate | Votes | % | ±% |
|---|---|---|---|---|
| Liberal | H. Quinney | 1,084 | 70.3 | N/A |
| Labour | R. McKeon | 443 | 28.7 | −4.6 |
| Residents | A. R. Edwards | 14 | 1.0 | +0.2 |
| Majority | | 641 | 41.6 | N/A |
| Turnout | | 1,541 | | |
| Liberal hold | | Swing | | |

=== All Saints', 18 January 1934 ===
Caused by the death of Councillor William Davies (Conservative, All Saints', elected 15 February 1927) on 22 December 1933.

All Saints'
| Party | Candidate | Votes | % | ±% |
|---|---|---|---|---|
| Labour | A. Lees | 1,312 | 53.0 | +3.4 |
| Conservative | C. A. Cave | 1,162 | 47.0 | −3.4 |
| Majority | | 150 | 6.0 | |
| Turnout | | 2,474 | | |
| Labour gain from Conservative | | Swing | | |

=== Moston, 20 March 1934 ===
Caused by the death of Councillor William Richard Mellor (Labour, Moston, elected 7 June 1916) on 2 March 1934.

Moston
| Party | Candidate | Votes | % | ±% |
|---|---|---|---|---|
| Labour | W. Onions | 2,431 | 54.2 | +6.9 |
| Conservative | W. P. Parker | 2,053 | 45.8 | −6.9 |
| Majority | | 378 | 8.4 | |
| Turnout | | 4,484 | | |
| Labour hold | | Swing | | |

=== Blackley, 19 April 1934 ===
Caused by the election as an alderman of Councillor Thomas Stone Williams (Liberal, Blackley, elected 1 November 1920, previously 1914-19) on 4 April 1934, following the death on 9 March 1934 of Alderman Isaac Hinchliffe (Conservative, elected as an alderman by the council on 6 March 1929).

Blackley
| Party | Candidate | Votes | % | ±% |
|---|---|---|---|---|
| Liberal | H. W. Irwin | 1,736 | 56.3 | N/A |
| Labour | W. Collingson | 1,346 | 43.7 | +0.9 |
| Majority | | 390 | 12,6 | |
| Turnout | | 3,082 | | |
| Liberal hold | | Swing | | |

=== Moss Side East, 15 May 1934 ===
Caused by the resignation of Councillor Godfrey Craven (Conservative, Moss Side East, elected 1 November 1932) on 2 May 1934.

Moss Side East
| Party | Candidate | Votes | % | ±% |
|---|---|---|---|---|
| Conservative | J. E. Pheasey | 882 | 53.2 | +2.8 |
| Labour | A. O'Donnell | 723 | 43.6 | −2.4 |
| Residents | A. R. Edwards | 53 | 3.2 | −0.4 |
| Majority | | 159 | 9.6 | +5.2 |
| Turnout | | 1,658 | | |
| Conservative hold | | Swing | | |

=== Oxford, 19 July 1934 ===
Caused by the election as an alderman of Councillor Robert William Shepherd (Conservative, Oxford, elected 1 November 1920, previously 1916-19) on 4 July 1934, following the resignation on 17 May 1934 of Alderman G. K. Ashton (Conservative, elected as an alderman by the council on 14 June 1911).

Oxford
| Party | Candidate | Votes | % | ±% |
|---|---|---|---|---|
| Conservative | C. B. Walker | 289 | 57.5 | N/A |
| Independent | A. Ellison | 214 | 42.5 | N/A |
| Majority | | 75 | 15.0 | N/A |
| Turnout | | 503 | | |
| Conservative hold | | Swing | | |
