= Wythenshawe (ward) =

- Ward
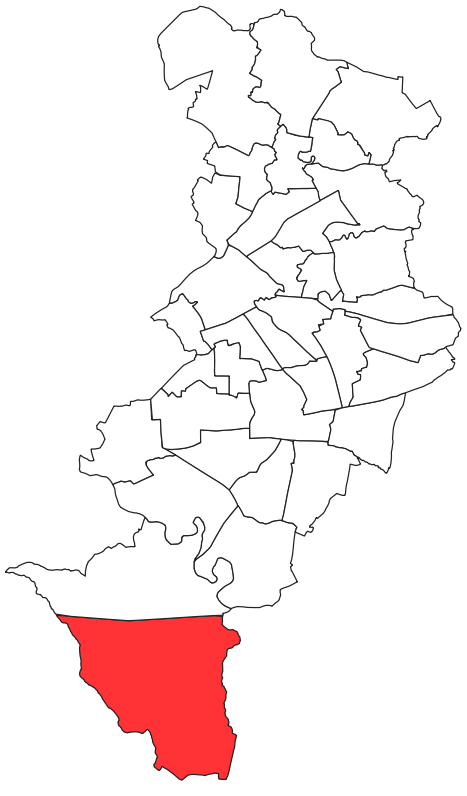
- Wythenshawe ward (1950) within Manchester

- Coat of arms
- Interactive map of Wythenshawe
- Country: United Kingdom
- Constituent country: England
- Region: North West England
- County borough: Manchester
- Created: March 1931
- Named for: Wythenshawe

Government
  - Type: Unicameral
  - Body: Manchester City Council
- UK Parliamentary Constituency: Manchester Wythenshawe

Wythenshawe was an electoral division of Manchester City Council which was represented from 1931 until 1954. It covered the Wythenshawe estate to the south the city.

== Overview ==
Wythenshawe ward was created in 1931, following the Manchester Extension Act 1930, which transferred the civil parishes of Baguley, Northenden, and Northen Etchells to the Manchester corporation. It covered the former civil parishes, previously part of the Bucklow Rural District, which became the Wythenshawe estate. Its boundaries were altered in 1950, when that part of the ward to the north of the Cheshire Lines Railway was transferred to the new Northenden ward. In 1954, the ward was abolished, and its former area was divided between the Baguley, Benchill, and Woodhouse Park wards.

From 1931 until 1945, the ward formed part of the Altrincham Parliamentary constituency. From 1945 until 1950 it was part of the Bucklow Parliamentary constituency. From 1950 until its abolition it was part of the Manchester Wythenshawe Parliamentary constituency.

== Councillors ==
Election	Councillor	Councillor	Councillor
March 1931	C. R. W. Menzies (Con)	W. Wolstenholme (Ind)	H. Ireland (Con)
August 1931	C. R. W. Menzies (Con)	S. Lowe (Con)	H. Ireland (Con)
1932	C. R. W. Menzies (Con)	S. Lowe (Con)	H. Bentley (Con)
1933	C. R. W. Menzies (Con)	S. Lowe (Con)	H. Bentley (Con)
1934	C. R. W. Menzies (Con)	S. Lowe (Con)	H. Bentley (Con)
1935	C. R. W. Menzies (Con)	S. Lowe (Con)	H. Bentley (Con)
1936	C. R. W. Menzies (Con)	J. Cooper (Lab)	H. Bentley (Con)
1937	C. A. Cave (Con)	J. Cooper (Lab)	H. Bentley (Con)
1938	C. A. Cave (Con)	J. Cooper (Lab)	E. A. Yarwood (Lab)
1945	C. A. Cave (Con)	W. Frost (Lab)	E. A. Yarwood (Lab)
1946	H. S. Gatley (Lab)	W. Frost (Lab)	E. A. Yarwood (Lab)
1947	H. S. Gatley (Lab)	W. Frost (Lab)	A. I. Oliver (Con)
1949	H. S. Gatley (Lab)	S. Ralphs (Con)	A. I. Oliver (Con)
1950	H. S. Gatley (Lab)	W. Walmsley (Con)	W. Davies (Con)
1951	H. S. Gatley (Lab)	W. Walmsley (Con)	W. Frost (Lab)
1952	H. S. Gatley (Lab)	H. Lloyd (Lab)	W. Frost (Lab)
1953	H. S. Gatley (Lab)	H. Lloyd (Lab)	W. Frost (Lab)

== Elections ==
=== Elections in 1930s ===
==== March 1931 ====
By-election: 25 March 1931 (3 vacancies)
Party	Candidate	Votes	%	±%
Conservative	C. R. W. Menzies	1,193	36.5	
Independent	W. Wolstenholme	1,080	33.1	
Conservative	H. Ireland	998	30.6	
Conservative	S. Lowe	995	30.5	
Liberal	W. Kennedy	766	23.5	
Labour	E. Whiteley	226	6.9	
Labour	G. Dixon	137	4.2	
Majority		3	0.1	
Turnout		3,265		
Conservative win (new seat)				
Independent win (new seat)				
Conservative win (new seat)				

==== August 1931 ====
By-election: 4 August 1931
Party	Candidate	Votes	%	±%
Conservative	S. Lowe	uncontested		
Conservative hold		Swing		

==== November 1932 ====
1932
Party	Candidate	Votes	%	±%
Conservative	H. Bentley*	uncontested		
Conservative hold		Swing		

==== November 1933 ====
1933
Party	Candidate	Votes	%	±%
Conservative	S. Lowe*	uncontested		
Conservative hold		Swing		

==== November 1934 ====
1934
Party	Candidate	Votes	%	±%
Conservative	C. R. W. Menzies*	2,185	36.1	N/A
Independent	S. D. Simon	2,005	33.1	N/A
Labour	F. Helme	1,868	30.8	N/A
Majority		180	3.0	N/A
Turnout		6,058		
Conservative hold		Swing		

==== November 1935 ====
1935
Party	Candidate	Votes	%	±%
Conservative	H. Bentley*	3,902	59.5	+23.4
Labour	B. Starkie	2,652	40.5	+9.7
Majority		1,250	19.0	+16.0
Turnout		6,553		
Conservative hold		Swing		

==== November 1936 ====
1936
Party	Candidate	Votes	%	±%
Labour	J. Cooper	2,899	55.0	+14.5
Conservative	S. Lowe*	2,369	45.0	−14.5
Majority		530	10.0	
Turnout		5,268		
Labour gain from Conservative		Swing		

==== November 1937 ====
1937
Party	Candidate	Votes	%	±%
Conservative	C. A. Cave	3,910	53.1	+8.1
Labour	E. A. Yarwood	3,460	46.9	−8.1
Majority		450	6.2	
Turnout		7,370		
Conservative hold		Swing		

==== November 1938 ====
1938
Party	Candidate	Votes	%	±%
Labour	E. A. Yarwood	4,522	50.9	+4.0
Conservative	H. Bentley*	4,354	49.1	−4.0
Majority		168	1.8	
Turnout		8,876		
Labour gain from Conservative		Swing		

=== Elections in 1940s ===
==== November 1945 ====
1945
Party	Candidate	Votes	%	±%
Labour	W. Frost	7,303	62.9	+12.0
Conservative	W. Walton	4,300	37.1	−12.0
Majority		3,003	25.8	+24.0
Turnout		11,603	41.2	
Labour hold		Swing		

==== November 1946 ====
1946
Party	Candidate	Votes	%	±%
Labour	H. S. Gatley	6,438	49.7	−13.2
Conservative	J. J. Shawe	5,873	45.3	+8.2
Communist	W. Prince	648	5.0	N/A
Majority		565	4.4	−21.4
Turnout		12,959		
Labour gain from Conservative		Swing		

==== November 1947 ====
1947
Party	Candidate	Votes	%	±%
Conservative	A. I. Oliver	9,723	53.0	+7.7
Labour	E. A. Yarwood*	8,137	44.4	−5.3
Communist	W. Prince	469	2.6	−2.4
Majority		1,586	8.6	
Turnout		18,329		
Conservative gain from Labour		Swing		

==== May 1949 ====
1949
Party	Candidate	Votes	%	±%
Conservative	S. Ralphs	8,802	50.7	−2.3
Labour	W. Frost*	7,643	44.0	−0.4
Liberal	R. T. Taylor	554	3.2	N/A
Communist	G. Taylor	372	2.1	−0.5
Majority		1,159	6.7	−1.9
Turnout		17,371		
Conservative gain from Labour		Swing		

=== Elections in 1950s ===
==== May 1950 ====
1950
Party	Candidate	Votes	%	±%
Labour	H. S. Gatley*	5,308	53.1	
Conservative	T. Duffy	4,493	44.9	
Communist	G. Taylor	201	2.0	
Majority		815	8.2	
Turnout		10,002		
Labour hold		Swing		

==== May 1951 ====
1951
Party	Candidate	Votes	%	±%
Labour	W. Frost	6,779	54.9	+1.8
Conservative	W. Davies*	5,579	45.1	+0.2
Majority		1,200	9.8	+1.6
Turnout		12,358		
Labour gain from Conservative		Swing		

==== May 1952 ====
1952
Party	Candidate	Votes	%	±%
Labour	H. Lloyd	10,525	70.0	+15.1
Conservative	W. Walmsley*	4,502	30.0	−15.1
Majority		6,023	40.0	+30.2
Turnout		15,027		
Labour gain from Conservative		Swing		

==== May 1953 ====
1953
Party	Candidate	Votes	%	±%
Labour	H. S. Gatley*	8,759	63.3	−6.7
Conservative	A. Williamson	4,684	33.8	+3.8
Independent	F. Frost	401	2.9	N/A
Majority		4,075	29.5	−10.5
Turnout		13,844		
Labour hold		Swing		

== See also ==
- Manchester City Council
- Manchester City Council elections
