= English League for the Taxation of Land Values =

The English League for the Taxation of Land Values was a Georgist political group. It was a historic precursor of two present-day reform bodies: the international umbrella organisation the IU and the UK think tank the Henry George Foundation. The object of the League was

the taxation for national and local purposes of the 'unimproved value of the land', ie the value of the land apart from the buildings or other improvements in or upon it. The League actively support[ed] all proposals in Parliament for separate valuation of land, and for making land values the basis of national and local taxation.

The organisation was established on 16 April 1883 as the Land Reform Union, inspired by social reformer Henry George's first UK lecture tour in 1883–4, and his book, Progress and Poverty. Early members of the group included John Charles Durrant, Stewart Headlam, James Leigh Joynes, Sydney Olivier, William Saunders, George Bernard Shaw, Henry Cary Shuttleworth, John Elliotson Symes, Helen Taylor, T. F. Walker and Philip Wicksteed. Initially, it focused on issuing leaflets explaining George's ideas. It also agreed to fund a second speaking tour of England for George.

At the organisation's first annual meeting, in May 1884, it renamed itself as the English Land Restoration League (ELRL). Frederick Verinder was appointed as the league's secretary, and Saunders became its first treasurer. George's tour went ahead later in the year, running into 1885, with speeches also made by Michael Davitt. Durant and Saunders took up the cause in Parliament, and the group worked with the London Municipal Reform League to put up agreed candidates for the London County Council election, 1889, many of whom were elected.

During the 1880s, the league organised regular meetings in Trafalgar Square. In 1887, its meeting was the last one prior to Bloody Sunday. Ending in chaos, Saunders was arrested and charged with riot, but he was acquitted.

In 1891, the league instituted a "red van" campaign, in which a group of speakers travelled in a van around various villages in Suffolk. It ran the tour in conjunction with the Eastern Counties Labour Federation, which claimed to have recruited 5,000 members as a result. Deemed a great success, it ran five vans in following years, and in the winters instead organised lecture series in London. As a result, in Victorian England "the principles for which the...League stood were made widely known, and found acceptance both in town and country". The Liberty and Property League was formed in an attempt to counter the ELRL's ideas, while the Land Nationalisation Society worked closely with the ELRL.

In 1902 the ELRL changed its name—"which involved no change of front nor change of principles"—to the English League for the Taxation of Land Values.

The League was a constituent part (as one of the three national members), and 1907 founder, of the United Committee for the Taxation of Land Values, which became the Henry George Foundation: as co-organiser of the 1926 International Conference in Denmark (and its 1923 precursor in Oxford, England), the League was a partner in the foundation of the International Union for Land Value Taxation and Free Trade, which became known simply as the IU. The United Committee and the IU became the principal vehicles for the League's work. The English league as a stand-alone organisation disappeared sometime after its general meeting in 1950, to which its Hon Secretary, Vic Blundell, "explained how the work of the English League was being carried on if not in name then in spirit by the combined activities of the associated groups": the United Committee for the Taxation of Land Values Ltd and the International Union for Land Value Taxation and Free Trade.
