= 1920 Manchester City Council election =

Local election in Manchester

- 1 November 1920

35 of 140 seats on Manchester City Council 71 seats needed for a majority
	First party	Second party	Third party
Party	Conservative	Liberal	Labour
Last election	12 seats, 33.1%	11 seats, 16.5%	19 seats, 35.2%
Seats before	62	38	34
Seats won	16	9	7
Seats after	63	38	33
Seat change	▲1	Steady	▼1
Popular vote	41,077	21,022	34,912
Percentage	36.6%	18.7%	31.1%
Swing	▲3.5%	▲2.2%	▼4.1%
	Fourth party	Fifth party
Party	Independent	Co-operative Party
Last election	3 seats, 7.6%	2 seats, 4.5%
Seats before	4	2
Seats won	2	1
Seats after	5	1
Seat change	▲1	▼1
Popular vote	8,569	5,451
Percentage	7.6%	4.3%
Swing	Steady	▼0.2%
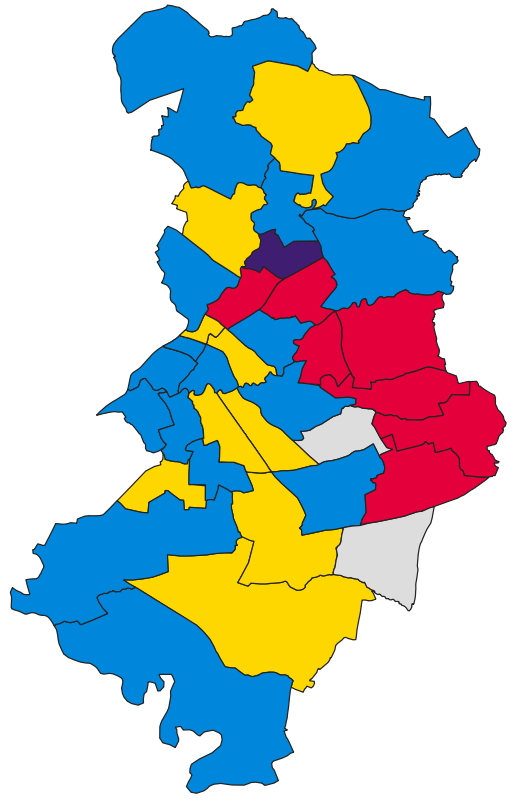
- Map of results of 1920 election
Leader of the Council before election
No overall control
Leader of the Council after election
No overall control

Elections to Manchester City Council were held on Monday, 1 November 1920. One third of the councillors seats were up for election, with each successful candidate to serve a three-year term of office. The council remained under no overall control.

== Election result ==
Party	Votes		Seats			Full Council	
Conservative Party	41,770 (36.6%)	▲3.5	16 (45.7%)	16 / 35	▲2	63 (45.0%)	63 / 140
Liberal Party	21,022 (18.7%)	▲2.2	9 (25.7%)	9 / 35	Steady	38 (27.1%)	38 / 140
Labour Party	34,912 (31.1%)	▼4.1	7 (20.0%)	7 / 35	▼1	33 (23.6%)	33 / 140
Independent	8,569 (7.6%)	Steady	2 (5.7%)	2 / 35	▲1	5 (3.6%)	5 / 140
Co-operative Party	4,810 (4.3%)	▼0.2	1 (2.9%)	1 / 35	▼1	1 (0.7%)	1 / 140
NFDDSS	1,040 (0.9%)	▼0.6	0 (0.0%)	0 / 35	▼1	0 (0.0%)	0 / 140

=== Full council ===
↓
33	1	38	5	63

== Ward results ==
=== All Saints' ===
All Saints'
Party	Candidate	Votes	%	±%
Liberal	M. J. O'Loughlin*	1,285	53.7	N/A
Conservative	J. Goodwin	1,109	46.3	N/A
Labour	H. J. Hanaway	719	23.1	−30.6
Majority		176	5.7	
Turnout		3,113	39.6	+19.0
Liberal hold		Swing		

=== Ardwick ===
Ardwick
Party	Candidate	Votes	%	±%
Conservative	A. E. B. Alexander*	2,580	70.2	+35.3
Labour	G. H. Harris	1,096	29.8	−35.3
Majority		1,484	40.4	
Turnout		3,676	35.6	+0.6
Conservative hold		Swing		

=== Beswick ===
Beswick
Party	Candidate	Votes	%	±%
Labour	W. Robinson*	2,796	56.1	−7.3
Conservative	J. Fiddiham	2,187	43.9	+4.5
Majority		609	12.2	−9.9
Turnout		4,983	43.7	+7.4
Labour hold		Swing		

=== Blackley ===
Blackley
Party	Candidate	Votes	%	±%
Liberal	T. S. Williams	2,014	69.7	+33.8
Co-operative Party	W. Holden	874	30.3	−2.9
Majority		1,140	39.4	+36.7
Turnout		2,888	36.9	−5.0
Liberal hold		Swing		

=== Bradford ===
Bradford
Party	Candidate	Votes	%	±%
Labour	E. J. Hart*	uncontested		
Labour hold		Swing		

=== Cheetham ===
Cheetham
Party	Candidate	Votes	%	±%
Liberal	J. J. Kendall*	2,881	64.9	N/A
Labour	C. Kean	1,558	35.1	N/A
Majority		1,323	29.8	N/A
Turnout		4,439	53.5	N/A
Liberal hold		Swing		

=== Chorlton-cum-Hardy ===
Chorlton-cum-Hardy
Party	Candidate	Votes	%	±%
Conservative	S. T. Rowe*	uncontested		
Conservative hold		Swing		

=== Collegiate Church ===
Collegiate Church
Party	Candidate	Votes	%	±%
Conservative	J. Hill*	779*	36.7	−12.2
Independent	D. Gouldman	779	36.7	+13.1
Liberal	D. Quas-Cohen	564	26.6	−1.0
Majority		0	0.0	−21.3
Turnout		2,122	62.2	+13.5
Conservative hold		Swing		

* Two candidates having received 779 votes each, Hill was returned on the Alderman's casting vote

=== Collyhurst ===
Collyhurst
Party	Candidate	Votes	%	±%
Co-operative Party	A. Park*	1,515	73.6	+18.4
Independent	J. T. Fisher	309	15.0	N/A
NFDDSS	J. Greaves	234	11.4	N/A
Majority		1,206	58.6	+41.8
Turnout		2,058	23.1	−6.4
Co-operative Party hold		Swing		

=== Crumpsall ===
Crumpsall
Party	Candidate	Votes	%	±%
Conservative	G. S. Grindley	1,324	40.9	N/A
Liberal	M. Goodwin	1,173	36.2	N/A
Labour	C. Stott	741	22.9	N/A
Majority		151	4.7	N/A
Turnout		3,238	58.2	N/A
Conservative hold		Swing		

=== Didsbury ===
Didsbury
Party	Candidate	Votes	%	±%
Conservative	G. H. White	2,457	80.7	N/A
Co-operative Party	G. Clegg-Claber	586	19.3	N/A
Majority		1,871	61.5	
Turnout		3,043	54.3	N.A
Conservative hold		Swing		

=== Exchange ===
Exchange
Party	Candidate	Votes	%	±%
Liberal	V. S. Wood*	597	74.2	N/A
Conservative	W. Chapman	208	25.8	N/A
Majority		389	48.3	
Turnout		805	36.4	+9.1
Liberal hold		Swing		

=== Gorton North ===
Gorton North
Party	Candidate	Votes	%	±%
Labour	W. Davy*	uncontested		
Labour hold		Swing		

=== Gorton South ===
Gorton South
Party	Candidate	Votes	%	±%
Labour	R. J. Davies*	2,174	51.8	−23.6
Conservative	J. H. B. Grimshaw	2,026	48.2	N/A
Majority		148	3.5	−47.3
Turnout		4,200	45.3	+15.3
Labour hold		Swing		

=== Harpurhey ===
Harpurhey
Party	Candidate	Votes	%	±%
Conservative	T. Hoyle	2,210	41.3	+13.9
Labour	A. E. Wolstenholme	1,473	27.5	−45.1
Liberal	H. W. Irwin	860	16.1	N/A
NFDDSS	J. Whelan*	806	15.1	N/A
Majority		737	13.8	
Turnout		5,349	56.7	+21.7
Conservative gain from NFDDSS		Swing		

=== Levenshulme ===
Levenshulme
Party	Candidate	Votes	%	±%
Independent	J. Harrison*	3,277	63.2	+12.8
Labour	L. B. Cox	1,911	36.8	−7.4
Majority		1,366	26.3	+20.3
Turnout		5,188	54.2	+10.6
Independent hold		Swing		

=== Longsight ===
Longsight
Party	Candidate	Votes	%	±%
Conservative	I. J. Rogers	3,082	61.5	+9.5
Labour	E. Whiteley*	1,932	38.5	−9.5
Majority		1,150	23.0	+19.0
Turnout		5,014	57.9	+18.8
Conservative gain from Labour		Swing		

=== Medlock Street ===
Medlock Street
Party	Candidate	Votes	%	±%
Conservative	W. J. Pine*	2,999	72.5	+10.6
Labour	A. E. Robinson	1,139	27.5	−10.6
Majority		1,860	45.0	+21.2
Turnout		4,138	36.6	+6.1
Conservative hold		Swing		

=== Miles Platting ===
Miles Platting
Party	Candidate	Votes	%	±%
Labour	A. James*	2,992	59.3	N/A
Conservative	S. Bloor	2,050	40.7	N/A
Majority		942	18.6	N/A
Turnout		5,042	52.4	N/A
Labour hold		Swing		

=== Moss Side East ===
Moss Side East
Party	Candidate	Votes	%	±%
Conservative	J. C. Brister	1,468	44.3	+12.9
Labour	E. J. Hookway	1,349	40.7	N/A
Liberal	E. Barker	499	15.0	N/A
Majority		119	3.6	
Turnout		3,316	32.6	−4.9
Conservative hold		Swing		

=== Moss Side West ===
Moss Side West
Party	Candidate	Votes	%	±%
Liberal	J. Mathewson Watson*	3,326	70.3	N/A
Conservative	P. Sims	1,408	29.7	N/A
Majority		1,918	40.6	
Turnout		4,734	41.3	N/A
Liberal hold		Swing		

=== Moston ===
Moston
Party	Candidate	Votes	%	±%
Conservative	J. Bostock	2,039	52.6	+19.2
Co-operative Party	T. Horrocks*	1,835	47.4	+3.4
Majority		204	5.2	
Turnout		3,874	38.6	−0.4
Conservative gain from Co-operative Party		Swing		

=== New Cross ===
New Cross
Party	Candidate	Votes	%	±%
Conservative	J. C. Grime*	3,039	60.1	−5.3
Labour	T. Cunningham	2,017	39.9	N/A
Majority		1,022	20.2	+1.5
Turnout		5,056	53.2	+20.4
Conservative hold		Swing		

=== Newton Heath ===
Newton Heath
Party	Candidate	Votes	%	±%
Conservative	R. M. Marshall	3,220	63.5	+28.4
Labour	I. Floyd	1,847	36.5	−28.4
Majority		1,373	27.0	
Turnout		5,067	64.3	+23.0
Conservative hold		Swing		

=== Openshaw ===
Openshaw
Party	Candidate	Votes	%	±%
Labour	G. F. Titt*	2,073	51.5	N/A
Conservative	W. Docker	1,952	48.5	N/A
Majority		121	3.0	N/A
Turnout		4,025	36.4	N/A
Labour hold		Swing		

=== Oxford ===
Oxford
Party	Candidate	Votes	%	±%
Conservative	R. W. Shepherd	615	56.3	+8.0
Liberal	A. England	477	43.7	−8.0
Majority		138	12.6	
Turnout		1,092	39.1	+14.6
Conservative gain from Liberal		Swing		

=== Rusholme ===
Rusholme
Party	Candidate	Votes	%	±%
Liberal	C. H. Barlow	1,802	46.9	−19.6
Conservative	M. L. K. Jones	1,112	29.0	−8.7
Labour	R. W. Wright	927	24.1	N/A
Majority		690	17.9	−10.9
Turnout		3,841	39.6	+3.7
Liberal gain from Conservative		Swing		

=== St. Ann's ===
St. Ann's
Party	Candidate	Votes	%	±%
Conservative	F. M. S. Grant*	uncontested		
Conservative hold		Swing		

=== St. Clement's ===
St. Clement's
Party	Candidate	Votes	%	±%
Liberal	W. Harrop*	uncontested		
Liberal hold		Swing		

=== St. George's ===
St. George's
Party	Candidate	Votes	%	±%
Conservative	C. A. Toyn	2,209	44.3	+4.8
Labour	C. Beamand	1,535	30.8	N/A
Liberal	E. I. Booth	1,238	24.9	−35.6
Majority		674	13.5	
Turnout		4,982	36.8	+11.2
Conservative hold		Swing		

=== St. John's ===
St. John's
Party	Candidate	Votes	%	±%
Conservative	I. Hinchliffe*	uncontested		
Conservative hold		Swing		

=== St. Luke's ===
St. Luke's
Party	Candidate	Votes	%	±%
Liberal	C. Herford*	2,227	64.4	N/A
Labour	W. H. Depledge	1,229	35.6	N/A
Majority		998	28.8	
Turnout		3,456	34.9	−2.5
Liberal hold		Swing		

=== St. Mark's ===
St. Mark's
Party	Candidate	Votes	%	±%
Independent	R. Turner	4,204	67.0	+18.4
Labour	W. R. Watson	2,075	33.0	−18.4
Majority		2,129	34.0	
Turnout		6,279	63.1	+13.4
Independent gain from Conservative		Swing		

=== St. Michael's ===
St. Michael's
Party	Candidate	Votes	%	±%
Labour	J. Reilly*	2,541	60.0	+7.2
Conservative	E. Rowland	1,697	40.0	−7.2
Majority		844	20.0	+14.4
Turnout		4,238	66.3	+8.6
Labour hold		Swing		

=== Withington ===
Withington
Party	Candidate	Votes	%	±%
Liberal	J. C. Jones*	2,079	72.5	N/A
Labour	J. Williams	788	27.5	N/A
Majority		1,291	45.0	N/A
Turnout		2,867	44.9	N/A
Liberal hold		Swing		

== Aldermanic elections ==
=== Aldermanic election, 2 March 1921 ===
Caused by the death on 4 February 1921 of Alderman James Fildes (Conservative, elected as an alderman by the council on 20 March 1907).

In his place, Councillor Robert Turner (Conservative, St. Mark's, elected 1 November 1920; previously 1905-19) was elected as an alderman by the council on 2 March 1921.

Party	Alderman	Ward	Term expires
Conservative	Robert Turner		1922

== By-elections between 1920 and 1921 ==
=== St. Michael's, 14 December 1920 ===
Caused by the death of Councillor Charles Egan (Liberal, St. Michael's, elected 1 November 1911) on 25 November 1920.

St. Michael's
Party	Candidate	Votes	%	±%
Labour	T. Cassidy	1,769	51.7	−8.3
Conservative	E. Rowland	1,650	48.3	+8.3
Majority		119	3.4	−16.6
Turnout		3,419		
Labour gain from Liberal		Swing		

=== St. Mark's, 15 March 1921 ===
Caused by the election as an alderman of Councillor Robert Turner (Conservative, St. Mark's, elected 1 November 1920; previously 1905-19) on 2 March 1921 following the death on 4 February 1921 of Alderman John Fildes (Conservative, elected as an alderman by the council on 20 March 1907).

St. Mark's
Party	Candidate	Votes	%	±%
Conservative	W. Chapman	2,423	52.9	N/A
Labour	E. Whiteley	2,161	47.1	+14.1
Majority		262	5.8	
Turnout		4,584		
Conservative hold		Swing		
