= 1937 Manchester City Council election =

Local election in Manchester

- 1 November 1937

36 of 144 seats on Manchester City Council 73 seats needed for a majority
	First party	Second party	Third party
Party	Conservative	Labour	Liberal
Last election	18 seats, 47.9%	14 seats, 42.8%	3 seats, 6.9%
Seats before	63	52	24
Seats won	16	14	4
Seats after	64	52	22
Seat change	▲1	Steady	▼2
Popular vote	50,413	51,886	12,818
Percentage	42.7%	43.9%	10.8%
Swing	▼5.2%	▲1.1%	▲3.9%
	Fourth party	Fifth party
Party	Independent	Independent Labour
Last election	1 seats, 1.3%	0 seats, 0.0%
Seats before	2	2
Seats won	1	0
Seats after	3	2
Seat change	▲1	Steady
Popular vote	1,812	0
Percentage	1.5%	0.0%
Swing	▲0.2%	Steady
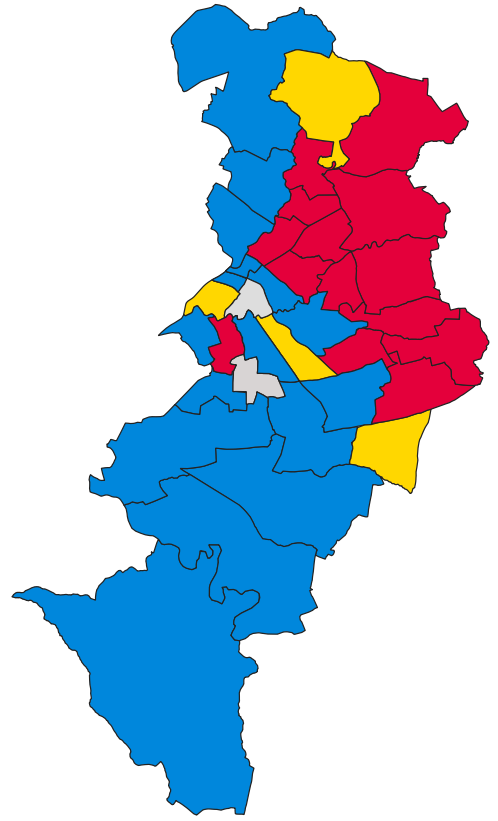
- Map of results of 1937 election
Leader of the Council before election
No overall control
Leader of the Council after election
No overall control

Elections to Manchester City Council were held on Monday, 1 November 1937. One third of the councillors seats were up for election, with each successful candidate to serve a three-year term of office. The council remained under no overall control.

== Election result ==
Party	Votes		Seats			Full Council	
Conservative Party	50,413 (42.7%)	▼5.2	16 (44.4%)	16 / 36	▲1	64 (44.4%)	64 / 144
Labour Party	51,886 (43.9%)	▲1.1	14 (38.9%)	14 / 36	Steady	52 (36.1%)	52 / 144
Liberal Party	12,818 (10.8%)	▲3.9	4 (11.1%)	4 / 36	▼2	22 (15.3%)	22 / 144
Independent	1,812 (1.5%)	▲0.2	1 (2.8%)	1 / 36	▲1	3 (2.1%)	3 / 144
Independent Labour	0 (0.0%)	Steady	0 (0.0%)	0 / 36	Steady	2 (1.4%)	2 / 144
Residents	1,248 (1.1%)	▲0.1	1 (2.8%)	1 / 36	▲1	1 (0.7%)	1 / 144

=== Full council ===
↓
2	52	22	1	3	64

=== Aldermen ===
↓
1	9	9	17

=== Councillors ===
↓
1	43	13	1	3	47

== Ward results ==
=== All Saints' ===
All Saints'
Party	Candidate	Votes	%	±%
Conservative	L. W. Biggs*	1,818	61.0	+5.0
Labour	E. A. Gower	1,164	39.0	−5.0
Majority		654	22.0	+1.0
Turnout		2,982		
Conservative hold		Swing		

=== Ardwick ===
Ardwick
Party	Candidate	Votes	%	±%
Conservative	N. Beer	2,471	53.0	−9.6
Labour	J. T. Wolfenden*	2,191	47.0	+9.6
Majority		280	6.0	−19.2
Turnout		4,662		
Conservative gain from Labour		Swing		

=== Beswick ===
Beswick
Party	Candidate	Votes	%	±%
Labour	H. Thorneycroft*	uncontested		
Labour hold		Swing		

=== Blackley ===
Blackley
Party	Candidate	Votes	%	±%
Liberal	H. Lee*	2,930	62.8	N/A
Labour	W. Footit	1,739	37.2	−8.6
Majority		1,191	25.6	
Turnout		4,669		
Liberal hold		Swing		

=== Bradford ===
Bradford
Party	Candidate	Votes	%	±%
Labour	H. Frankland*	2,766	64.1	−3.2
Conservative	C. E. Holdnall	1,546	35.9	+3.2
Majority		1,220	28.2	−6.4
Turnout		4,312		
Labour hold		Swing		

=== Cheetham ===
Cheetham
Party	Candidate	Votes	%	±%
Conservative	J. C. Kidd*	1,859	45.0	N/A
Liberal	S. Needoff	1,277	31.0	−41.7
Labour	R. P. Fisher	990	24.0	−3.3
Majority		582	14.0	
Turnout		4,126		
Conservative hold		Swing		

=== Chorlton-cum-Hardy ===
Chorlton-cum-Hardy
Party	Candidate	Votes	%	±%
Conservative	W. Somerville*	5,776	73.8	−5.5
Labour	F. Beverley	2,052	26.2	+5.5
Majority		3,724	47.6	−11.0
Turnout		7,828		
Conservative hold		Swing		

=== Collegiate Church ===
Collegiate Church
Party	Candidate	Votes	%	±%
Conservative	S. Holmes*	842	63.0	N/A
Labour	E. A. Whitehead	495	37.0	+12.4
Majority		347	26.0	
Turnout		1,337		
Conservative hold		Swing		

=== Collyhurst ===
Collyhurst
Party	Candidate	Votes	%	±%
Labour	W. Collingson*	1,624	65.3	+2.6
Conservative	M. Williams	864	34.7	−2.6
Majority		760	30.6	+5.2
Turnout		2,488		
Labour hold		Swing		

=== Crumpsall ===
Crumpsall
Party	Candidate	Votes	%	±%
Conservative	F. Weaver*	2,200	63.3	+0.3
Labour	R. B. Prain	1,148	33.0	+1.1
Independent	W. Dennison	130	3.7	−1.4
Majority		1,052	30.3	−0.8
Turnout		3,478		
Conservative hold		Swing		

=== Didsbury ===
Didsbury
Party	Candidate	Votes	%	±%
Conservative	S. P. Dawson*	3,319	73.2	+5.6
Labour	P. H. Keeley	1,214	26.8	−5.6
Majority		2,105	46.4	+11.2
Turnout		4,533		
Conservative hold		Swing		

=== Exchange ===
Exchange
Party	Candidate	Votes	%	±%
Conservative	T. A. Higson*	uncontested		
Conservative hold		Swing		

=== Gorton North ===
Gorton North
Party	Candidate	Votes	%	±%
Labour	T. F. Regan*	3,561	63.7	N/A
Conservative	G. M. Brewster	2,032	36.3	N/A
Majority		1,529	27.4	N/A
Turnout		5,593		
Labour hold		Swing		

=== Gorton South ===
Gorton South
Party	Candidate	Votes	%	±%
Labour	J. Sutton*	3,400	72.7	+10.3
Independent	E. Appleton	1,277	27.3	N/A
Majority		2,123	45.4	+20.6
Turnout		4,677		
Labour hold		Swing		

=== Harpurhey ===
Harpurhey
Party	Candidate	Votes	%	±%
Labour	E. Barnacott*	2,305	50.4	+7.0
Conservative	E. Shaw	2,267	49.6	−7.0
Majority		38	0.8	
Turnout		4,572		
Labour hold		Swing		

=== Levenshulme ===
Levenshulme
Party	Candidate	Votes	%	±%
Liberal	C. R. de la Wyche*	2,584	62.8	N/A
Labour	M. Knight	1,528	37.2	+3.2
Majority		1,056	25.6	
Turnout		4,112		
Liberal hold		Swing		

=== Longsight ===
Longsight
Party	Candidate	Votes	%	±%
Conservative	W. N. Griffin*	2,442	57.0	−11.5
Labour	F. Walker	1,843	43.0	+11.5
Majority		599	14.0	−23.0
Turnout		4,285		
Conservative hold		Swing		

=== Medlock Street ===
Medlock Street
Party	Candidate	Votes	%	±%
Labour	J. Owen	1,712	54.3	−12.0
Conservative	P. T. Barnes*	1,442	45.7	+12.0
Majority		270	8.6	−24.0
Turnout		3,154		
Labour gain from Conservative		Swing		

=== Miles Platting ===
Miles Platting
Party	Candidate	Votes	%	±%
Labour	W. C. Chadwick*	uncontested		
Labour hold		Swing		

=== Moss Side East ===
Moss Side East
Party	Candidate	Votes	%	±%
Residents	A. R. Edwards	1,248	36.0	+7.2
Conservative	H. Strange*	1,165	33.6	−6.4
Labour	W. Griffiths	1,057	30.4	−0.8
Majority		83	2.4	
Turnout		3,470		
Residents gain from Conservative		Swing		

=== Moss Side West ===
Moss Side West
Party	Candidate	Votes	%	±%
Conservative	S. C. Brewster*	1,928	62.9	+0.2
Labour	T. Knowles	1,136	37.1	+7.1
Majority		792	25.8	−6.9
Turnout		3,064		
Conservative hold		Swing		

=== Moston ===
Moston
Party	Candidate	Votes	%	±%
Labour	W. Onions*	uncontested		
Labour hold		Swing		

=== New Cross ===
New Cross
Party	Candidate	Votes	%	±%
Labour	H. J. Delargy	2,634	67.5	−2.7
Conservative	M. Sekian	1,271	32.5	+2.7
Majority		1,363	35.0	−5.4
Turnout		3,905		
Labour hold		Swing		

=== Newton Heath ===
Newton Heath
Party	Candidate	Votes	%	±%
Labour	C. E. P. Stott*	2,495	56.3	N/A
Conservative	H. Poulter	1,936	43.7	N/A
Majority		559	12.6	N/A
Turnout		4,431		
Labour hold		Swing		

=== Openshaw ===
Openshaw
Party	Candidate	Votes	%	±%
Labour	T. Nally	uncontested		
Labour hold		Swing		

=== Oxford ===
Oxford
Party	Candidate	Votes	%	±%
Independent	A. Ellison	405	53.6	N/A
Liberal	J. T. Griffiths*	351	46.4	N/A
Majority		54	7.2	N/A
Turnout		756		
Independent gain from Liberal		Swing		

=== Rusholme ===
Rusholme
Party	Candidate	Votes	%	±%
Conservative	R. C. Rodgers*	2,452	67.9	N/A
Labour	W. E. Harrison	1,158	32.1	+6.6
Majority		1,294	47.0	
Turnout		3,610		
Conservative hold		Swing		

=== St. Ann's ===
St. Ann's
Party	Candidate	Votes	%	±%
Conservative	E. Green*	uncontested		
Conservative hold		Swing		

=== St. Clement's ===
St. Clement's
Party	Candidate	Votes	%	±%
Conservative	P. C. Parker*	uncontested		
Conservative hold		Swing		

=== St. George's ===
St. George's
Party	Candidate	Votes	%	±%
Conservative	R. B. Breeze	1,834	51.0	+3.9
Labour	A. B. Horan*	1,763	49.0	−3.9
Majority		71	2.0	
Turnout		3,597		
Conservative gain from Labour		Swing		

=== St. John's ===
St. John's
Party	Candidate	Votes	%	±%
Liberal	F. E. Tylecote*	uncontested		
Liberal hold		Swing		

=== St. Luke's ===
St. Luke's
Party	Candidate	Votes	%	±%
Liberal	T. R. Ackroyd*	2,028	60.5	N/A
Labour	W. Gallacher	1,325	39.5	−6.8
Majority		703	21.0	
Turnout		3,353		
Liberal hold		Swing		

=== St. Mark's ===
St. Mark's
Party	Candidate	Votes	%	±%
Labour	J. W. Ellershaw*	2,474	58.2	−5.1
Conservative	G. Boden	1,780	41.8	+5.1
Majority		694	16.4	−10.2
Turnout		4,254		
Labour hold		Swing		

=== St. Michael's ===
St. Michael's
Party	Candidate	Votes	%	±%
Labour	A. Cathcart*	1,920	62.0	N/A
Conservative	E. Elliott	1,176	38.0	N/A
Majority		744	24.0	N/A
Turnout		3,096		
Labour hold		Swing		

=== Withington ===
Withington
Party	Candidate	Votes	%	±%
Conservative	W. H. Scholfield	4,083	39.0	−1.6
Liberal	A. P. Simon	3,648	34.9	+3.4
Labour	D. Hunter	2,732	26.1	−1.8
Majority		435	4.1	−5.0
Turnout		10,463		
Conservative gain from Liberal		Swing		

=== Wythenshawe ===
Wythenshawe
Party	Candidate	Votes	%	±%
Conservative	C. A. Cave	3,910	53.1	+8.1
Labour	E. A. Yarwood	3,460	46.9	−8.1
Majority		450	6.2	
Turnout		7,370		
Conservative hold		Swing		

== Aldermanic elections ==
=== Aldermanic election, 16 February 1938 ===
Caused by the death on 4 February 1938 of Alderman R. A. D. Carter (Conservative, elected as an alderman by the council on 9 November 1909).

In his place, Councillor Thomas Cassidy (Labour, St. Michael's, elected 14 December 1920) was elected as an alderman by the council on 16 February 1938.

Party	Alderman	Ward	Term expires
Labour	Thomas Cassidy	Levenshulme	1940

=== Aldermanic election, 27 July 1938 ===
Caused by the death on 29 June 1938 of Alderman Joseph Crookes Grime (Conservative, elected as an alderman by the council on 2 March 1932).

In his place, Councillor Mary Latchford Kingsmill Jones (Conservative, Ardwick, elected 1 November 1921) was elected as an alderman by the council on 27 July 1938.

Party	Alderman	Ward	Term expires
Conservative	Mary Latchford Kingsmill Jones	Wythenshawe	1943

== By-elections between 1937 and 1938 ==
=== St. Michael's, 3 March 1938 ===
Caused by the election as an alderman of Councillor Thomas Cassidy (Labour, St. Michael's, elected 14 December 1920) on 16 February 1938, following the death on 4 February 1938 of Alderman R. A. D. Carter (Conservative, elected as an alderman by the council on 9 November 1909).

St. Michael's
Party	Candidate	Votes	%	±%
Labour	J. J. Flynn	1,385	56.5	N/A
Conservative	E. Elliott	925	37.7	N/A
Residents	A. M. Edwards	142	5.8	N/A
Majority		460	18.8	−5.2
Turnout		2,452		
Labour hold		Swing		

=== Collegiate Church, 10 March 1938 ===
Caused by the death of Councillor David Gouldman (Independent, Collegiate Church, elected 1 November 1921) on 11 February 1938.

Collegiate Church
Party	Candidate	Votes	%	±%
Independent	A. Gouldman	792	38.6	N/A
Labour	E. A. Whitehead	498	24.3	−12.7
Liberal	P. I. Wigoder	414	20.2	N/A
Conservative	A. Levy	336	63.0	−46.6
Independent	T. A. Bardsley	10	0.5	N/A
Majority		294	14.3	
Turnout		2,050		
Independent hold		Swing		

=== St. Luke's, 30 June 1938 ===
Caused by the death of Councillor Thomas Harrison (Conservative, St. Luke's, elected 24 November 1925) on 23 May 1938.

St. Luke's
Party	Candidate	Votes	%	±%
Conservative	C. V. Jarvis	1,399	55.0	N/A
Labour	W. Gallacher	1,065	41.8	+2.3
Residents	A. M. Edwards	81	3.2	N/A
Majority		334	13.2	
Turnout		2,545		
Conservative hold		Swing		

=== Ardwick, 1 September 1938 ===
Caused by the election as an alderman Councillor Mary Latchford Kingsmill Jones (Conservative, Ardwick, elected 1 November 1921) on 27 July 1938, following the death on 29 June 1938 of Alderman Joseph Crookes Grime (Conservative, elected as an alderman by the council on 2 March 1932).

Ardwick
Party	Candidate	Votes	%	±%
Conservative	J. McGrath	1,737	51.7	−1.3
Labour	F. Helme	1,270	37.8	+9.2
Independent Labour	J. T. Wolfenden	352	10.5	N/A
Majority		467	13.9	+7.9
Turnout		3,359		
Conservative hold		Swing		
