= Ardwick (ward) =

- Ward
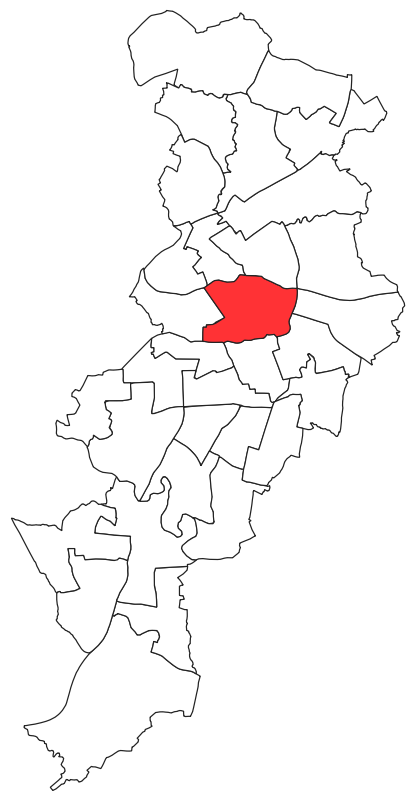
- Ardwick ward (2018) within Manchester

- Coat of arms
- Country: United Kingdom
- Constituent country: England
- Region: North West England
- County: Greater Manchester
- Metropolitan borough: Manchester
- Created: December 1838
- Named for: Ardwick

Government
  - Type: Unicameral
  - Body: Manchester City Council
- UK Parliamentary Constituency: Manchester Rusholme

Ardwick is an electoral division of Manchester City Council which has been represented since 1838. It covers Ardwick and parts of Chorlton-on-Medlock.

== Overview ==
Ardwick ward was one of the fifteen municipal wards created in 1838, when the Manchester Borough Council was granted a Charter of Incorporation under the provisions of the Municipal Corporations Act 1835.

Initially, the ward covered the former townships of Ardwick and Beswick, which had been absorbed into Manchester by the borough's Charter of Incorporation. Its original boundaries remained in place until 1885, when the whole of the Beswick township was transferred to the new Bradford ward. Further boundary revisions took place in 1919 and 1950, which reduced the ward's overall area. The ward was significantly enlarged in 1971, incorporating the northern portion of the former St. Mark's ward and the whole of the former St. Luke's ward. City-wide boundary changes in 1982 had relatively little effect on the Ardwick ward, while a further revision in 2004 transferred the northern portion of the Longsight ward into Ardwick. At the latest boundary revision in 2018, the area surrounding the Manchester Royal Infirmary and Whitworth Park was transferred to Ardwick from the Moss Side ward.

From 1838 until 1885, the ward formed part of the Manchester Parliamentary constituency. From 1885 until 1918, it was part of the Manchester East Parliamentary constituency. From 1918 until 1983, it was part of the Manchester Ardwick Parliamentary constituency. From 1983 until 2024, it was part of the Manchester Central Parliamentary constituency. As of 2024, it forms part of the Manchester Rusholme Parliamentary constituency.

== Councillors ==
=== Councillors 1838-1970 ===
Election	Councillor	Councillor	Councillor
1838	William Benjamin Watkins (Lib)	Paul Ferdinand Willert (Lib)	Aaron Nodal (Lib)
1839	William Benjamin Watkins (Lib)	Paul Ferdinand Willert (Lib)	Aaron Nodal (Lib)
1840	William Benjamin Watkins (Lib)	Paul Ferdinand Willert (Lib)	Aaron Nodal (Lib)
1841	William Benjamin Watkins (Lib)	Paul Ferdinand Willert (Lib)	Aaron Nodal (Lib)
1842	William Benjamin Watkins (Lib)	Paul Ferdinand Willert (Lib)	James Thompson (Lib)
1843	William Benjamin Watkins (Lib)	Edmund Peel Thompson (Lib)	James Thompson (Lib)
1844	Henry Lees (Lib)	Edmund Peel Thompson (Lib)	James Thompson (Lib)
1845	Henry Lees (Lib)	Edmund Peel Thompson (Lib)	James Thompson (Lib)
(1845–1872)
1872	J. Thompson (Lib)	J. Vickers (Lib)	R. Whittaker (Con)
1873	J. Thompson (Lib)	R. K. Payne (Con)	R. Whittaker (Con)
1874	J. Thompson (Lib)	R. K. Payne (Con)	R. Whittaker (Con)
1875	J. Thompson (Lib)	R. K. Payne (Con)	G. H. Midwood (Con)
1876	J. Thompson (Lib)	R. K. Payne (Con)	G. H. Midwood (Con)
1877	J. Thompson (Lib)	R. K. Payne (Con)	G. H. Midwood (Con)
1878	J. Thompson (Lib)	R. K. Payne (Con)	G. H. Midwood (Con)
1879	J. Thompson (Lib)	J. Hinchliffe (Con)	G. H. Midwood (Con)
1880	S. Chesters Thompson (Con)	J. Hinchliffe (Con)	G. H. Midwood (Con)
1881	S. Chesters Thompson (Con)	J. Hinchliffe (Con)	J. Whittaker (Con)
1882	S. Chesters Thompson (Con)	J. Hinchliffe (Con)	J. Whittaker (Con)
1883	S. Chesters Thompson (Con)	J. Hinchliffe (Con)	J. Whittaker (Con)
1884	S. Chesters Thompson (Con)	J. Hinchliffe (Con)	J. H. Crosfield (Lib)
1885	S. Chesters Thompson (Con)	J. Hinchliffe (Con)	J. H. Crosfield (Lib)
1886	S. Chesters Thompson (Con)	J. Hinchliffe (Con)	J. H. Crosfield (Lib)
1887	S. Chesters Thompson (Con)	J. Hinchliffe (Con)	E. Tatton (Con)
1888	S. Chesters Thompson (Con)	J. Hinchliffe (Con)	E. Tatton (Con)
1889	S. Chesters Thompson (Con)	J. Hinchliffe (Con)	E. Tatton (Con)
1890	S. Chesters Thompson (Con)	J. Hinchliffe (Con)	E. Tatton (Con)
March 1891	S. Chesters (Con)	J. Hinchliffe (Con)	E. Tatton (Con)
April 1891	S. Chesters (Con)	W. Fitzgerald (Con)	E. Tatton (Con)
September 1891	R. C. Smith (Lib U)	W. Fitzgerald (Con)	E. Tatton (Con)
1891	R. C. Smith (Lib U)	W. Fitzgerald (Con)	E. Tatton (Con)
1892	R. C. Smith (Lib U)	W. Fitzgerald (Con)	E. Tatton (Con)
1893	R. C. Smith (Lib U)	W. Fitzgerald (Con)	W. Pollitt (Con)
1894	R. C. Smith (Con)	W. Fitzgerald (Con)	W. Pollitt (Con)
1895	R. C. Smith (Con)	W. Fitzgerald (Con)	W. Pollitt (Con)
1896	R. C. Smith (Con)	W. Fitzgerald (Con)	W. Pollitt (Con)
March 1897	S. Chesters Thompson (Con)	W. Fitzgerald (Con)	W. Pollitt (Con)
1897	S. Chesters Thompson (Con)	J. Whittaker (Con)	W. Pollitt (Con)
1898	S. Chesters Thompson (Con)	J. Whittaker (Con)	W. Pollitt (Con)
February 1899	S. Chesters Thompson (Con)	J. Whittaker (Con)	W. Pollitt (Con)
1899	S. Chesters Thompson (Con)	J. Whittaker (Con)	W. Pollitt (Con)
1900	S. Chesters Thompson (Con)	J. Whittaker (Con)	W. Pollitt (Con)
1901	S. Chesters Thompson (Con)	J. Whittaker (Con)	W. Pollitt (Con)
December 1901	S. Chesters Thompson (Con)	J. Whittaker (Con)	J. Stewart (Con)
1902	S. Chesters Thompson (Con)	J. Whittaker (Con)	J. Stewart (Con)
1903	S. Chesters Thompson (Con)	R. Hughes (Ind)	J. Stewart (Con)
1904	T. Lowth (Lab)	R. Hughes (Ind)	J. Stewart (Con)
1905	T. Lowth (Lab)	R. Hughes (Ind)	J. Stewart (Con)
1906	T. Lowth (Lab)	J. Doyle (Lab)	J. Stewart (Con)
1907	J. Smith (Con)	J. Doyle (Lab)	J. Stewart (Con)
1908	J. Smith (Con)	J. Doyle (Lab)	J. Stewart (Con)
1909	J. Smith (Con)	J. E. Chapman (Con)	J. Stewart (Con)
1910	F. Sturgess (Con)	J. E. Chapman (Con)	J. Stewart (Con)
1911	F. Sturgess (Con)	J. E. Chapman (Con)	J. M. McLachlan (Lab)
1912	F. Sturgess (Con)	J. E. Chapman (Con)	J. M. McLachlan (Lab)
1913	K. W. Jones (Con)	J. E. Chapman (Con)	J. M. McLachlan (Lab)
1914	K. W. Jones (Con)	J. E. Chapman (Con)	J. M. McLachlan (Lab)
1919	A. E. B. Alexander (Con)	H. Weate (Lab)	J. M. McLachlan (Lab)
November 1919	A. E. B. Alexander (Con)	H. Weate (Lab)	R. C. Wallhead (Lab)
1920	A. E. B. Alexander (Con)	H. Weate (Lab)	R. C. Wallhead (Lab)
1921	A. E. B. Alexander (Con)	H. Weate (Lab)	M. L. K. Jones (Con)
1922	A. E. B. Alexander (Con)	H. Weate (Lab)	M. L. K. Jones (Con)
1923	A. E. B. Alexander (Con)	H. Weate (Lab)	M. L. K. Jones (Con)
1924	A. E. B. Alexander (Con)	H. Weate (Lab)	M. L. K. Jones (Con)
1925	A. E. B. Alexander (Con)	H. Weate (Lab)	M. L. K. Jones (Con)
1926	J. M. Wharton (Lab)	H. Weate (Lab)	M. L. K. Jones (Con)
1927	J. M. Wharton (Lab)	H. Weate (Lab)	M. L. K. Jones (Con)
1928	J. M. Wharton (Lab)	J. Whittle (Con)	M. L. K. Jones (Con)
1929	J. M. Wharton (Lab)	J. Whittle (Con)	M. L. K. Jones (Con)
1930	J. M. Wharton (Lab)	J. Whittle (Con)	M. L. K. Jones (Con)
1931	J. M. Wharton (Lab)	G. Grocock (Con)	M. L. K. Jones (Con)
1932	J. M. Wharton (Lab)	G. Grocock (Con)	M. L. K. Jones (Con)
1933	J. M. Wharton (Lab)	G. Grocock (Con)	M. L. K. Jones (Con)
1934	J. M. Wharton (Lab)	J. T. Wolfenden (Lab)	M. L. K. Jones (Con)
1935	J. M. Wharton (Lab)	J. T. Wolfenden (Lab)	M. L. K. Jones (Con)
1936	J. M. Wharton (Lab)	J. T. Wolfenden (Lab)	M. L. K. Jones (Con)
1937	J. M. Wharton (Lab)	N. Beer (Con)	M. L. K. Jones (Con)
September 1938	J. M. Wharton (Lab)	N. Beer (Con)	J. McGrath (Con)
1938	J. Dook (Con)	N. Beer (Con)	J. McGrath (Con)
1945	J. Dook (Con)	N. Beer (Con)	J. McGrath (Lab)
1946	J. Dook (Con)	H. Humphreys (Lab)	J. McGrath (Lab)
October 1947	P. Buckley (Con)	H. Humphreys (Lab)	J. McGrath (Con)
1947	P. Buckley (Con)	H. Humphreys (Lab)	J. McGrath (Con)
1949	P. Buckley (Con)	H. Humphreys (Lab)	T. Dobbins (Con)
1950	P. Buckley (Con)	V. Wilson (Lab)	T. Dobbins (Con)
1951	P. Buckley (Con)	V. Wilson (Lab)	T. Dobbins (Con)
1952	P. Buckley (Con)	V. Wilson (Lab)	W. Parkins (Lab)
1953	P. Buckley (Con)	V. Wilson (Lab)	W. Parkins (Lab)
1954	F. Taylor (Lab)	V. Wilson (Lab)	W. Parkins (Lab)
1955	F. Taylor (Lab)	V. Wilson (Lab)	W. M. Parkinson (Lab)
1956	F. Taylor (Lab)	V. Wilson (Lab)	W. M. Parkinson (Lab)
1957	F. Taylor (Lab)	V. Wilson (Lab)	W. M. Parkinson (Lab)
1958	F. Taylor (Lab)	V. Wilson (Lab)	W. M. Parkinson (Lab)
1959	F. Taylor (Lab)	V. Wilson (Lab)	W. M. Parkinson (Lab)
1960	F. Taylor (Lab)	V. Wilson (Lab)	W. M. Parkinson (Lab)
1961	F. Taylor (Lab)	V. Wilson (Lab)	W. M. Parkinson (Lab)
1962	F. Taylor (Lab)	V. Wilson (Lab)	W. M. Parkinson (Lab)
1963	F. Taylor (Lab)	V. Wilson (Lab)	W. M. Parkinson (Lab)
November 1963	F. Taylor (Lab)	K. J. Hill (Lab)	W. M. Parkinson (Lab)
1964	F. Taylor (Lab)	K. J. Hill (Lab)	W. M. Parkinson (Lab)
1965	F. Taylor (Lab)	K. J. Hill (Lab)	W. M. Parkinson (Lab)
1966	F. Taylor (Lab)	K. J. Hill (Lab)	W. M. Parkinson (Lab)
1967	F. Taylor (Lab)	K. J. Hill (Lab)	D. Taylor (Con)
1968	F. Taylor (Lab)	G. Taylor (Con)	D. Taylor (Con)
October 1968	H. Barrett (Lab)	G. Taylor (Con)	D. Taylor (Con)
1969	H. Barrett (Lab)	G. Taylor (Con)	D. Taylor (Con)
1970	H. Barrett (Lab)	G. Taylor (Con)	A. S. Goldstone (Lab)

=== Councillors 1971-1981 ===
Election	Councillor	Councillor	Councillor
1971	A. S. Goldstone (Lab)	F. Dale (Lab)	H. Barrett (Lab)
1972	A. S. Goldstone (Lab)	F. Dale (Lab)	H. Barrett (Lab)
1973	H. Barrett (Lab)	F. Dale (Lab)	N. I. Finley (Lab)
1975	H. Barrett (Lab)	F. Dale (Lab)	N. I. Finley (Lab)
1976	H. Barrett (Lab)	F. Dale (Lab)	N. I. Finley (Lab)
1978	H. Barrett (Lab)	F. Dale (Lab)	N. I. Finley (Lab)
1979	H. Barrett (Lab)	F. Dale (Lab)	N. I. Finley (Lab)
1980	H. Barrett (Lab)	F. Dale (Lab)	N. I. Finley (Lab)

=== Councillors 1982-2003 ===
Election	Councillor	Councillor	Councillor
1982	H. Barrett (Lab)	F. Dale (Lab)	N. I. Finley (Lab)
1983	H. Barrett (Lab)	F. Dale (Lab)	N. I. Finley (Lab)
1984	H. Barrett (Lab)	F. Dale (Lab)	N. I. Finley (Lab)
1986	H. Barrett (Lab)	F. Dale (Lab)	N. I. Finley (Lab)
1987	H. Barrett (Lab)	F. Dale (Lab)	N. I. Finley (Lab)
1988	H. Barrett (Lab)	E. H. Hopkins (Lab)	N. I. Finley (Lab)
1990	H. Barrett (Lab)	E. H. Hopkins (Lab)	N. I. Finley (Lab)
1991	H. Barrett (Lab)	E. H. Hopkins (Lab)	N. I. Finley (Lab)
1992	H. Barrett (Lab)	E. H. Hopkins (Lab)	N. I. Finley (Lab)
1994	L. Murphy (Lab)	E. H. Hopkins (Lab)	N. I. Finley (Lab)
1995	L. Murphy (Lab)	E. H. Hopkins (Lab)	I. Summers (Lab)
1996	L. Murphy (Lab)	T. O'Callaghan (Lab)	I. Summers (Lab)
1998	L. Murphy (Lab)	T. O'Callaghan (Lab)	B. Priest (Lab)
1999	L. Murphy (Lab)	T. O'Callaghan (Lab)	B. Priest (Lab)
2000	L. Murphy (Lab)	T. O'Callaghan (Lab)	B. Priest (Lab)
2002	M. Smitheman (Lab)	T. O'Callaghan (Lab)	B. Priest (Lab)
2003	M. Smitheman (Lab)	T. O'Callaghan (Lab)	B. Priest (Lab)

=== Councillors 2000-2017 ===
Election	Councillor	Councillor	Councillor
2004	Tom O'Callaghan (Lab)	Bernard Priest (Lab)	Mavis Smitheman (Lab)
2006	Tom O'Callaghan (Lab)	Bernard Priest (Lab)	Mavis Smitheman (Lab)
2007	Tom O'Callaghan (Lab)	Bernard Priest (Lab)	Mavis Smitheman (Lab)
2008	Tom O'Callaghan (Lab)	Bernard Priest (Lab)	Mavis Smitheman (Lab)
2010	Tom O'Callaghan (Lab)	Bernard Priest (Lab)	Mavis Smitheman (Lab)
2011	Tom O'Callaghan (Lab)	Bernard Priest (Lab)	Mavis Smitheman (Lab)
2012	Tom O'Callaghan (Lab)	Bernard Priest (Lab)	Mavis Smitheman (Lab)
November 2012	Tina Hewitson (Lab)	Bernard Priest (Lab)	Mavis Smitheman (Lab)
2014	Tina Hewitson (Lab)	Bernard Priest (Lab)	Mavis Smitheman (Lab)
2015	Tina Hewitson (Lab)	Bernard Priest (Lab)	Mavis Smitheman (Lab)
2016	Tina Hewitson (Lab)	Bernard Priest (Lab)	Mavis Smitheman (Lab)

=== Councillors 2018-2026 ===
Election	Councillor	Councillor	Councillor
2018	Tina Hewitson (Lab)	Bernard Priest (Lab)	Mavis Smitheman (Lab)
2018	Tina Hewitson (Lab)	Bernard Priest (Lab)	Amna Abdullatif (Lab)
2021	Tina Hewitson (Lab)	Bernard Priest (Lab)	Amna Abdullatif (Lab)
2022	Tina Hewitson (Lab)	Bernard Priest (Lab)	Amna Abdullatif (Lab)
May 2023	Tina Hewitson (Lab)	Abdigafar Muse (Lab)	Amna Abdullatif (Lab)
October 2023	Tina Hewitson (Lab)	Abdigafar Muse (Lab)	Amna Abdullatif (Ind)
2024	Tina Hewitson (Lab)	Abdigafar Muse (Lab)	Amna Abdullatif (Ind)
April 2026	Tina Hewitson (Lab)	Abdigafar Muse (Lab)	Amna Abdullatif (Grn)
May 2026	Alex-Salik Imran (Grn)	Abdigafar Muse (Lab)	Amna Abdullatif (Grn)

== Elections ==
=== Elections in 2020s ===
==== May 2026 ====
2026
Party	Candidate	Votes	%	±%
Green	Alex-Salik Imran	1,607	45.8	▲37.7
Labour	Tina Hewitson*	1,128	32.1	▼46.7
Reform	Charlie Stott	295	8.4	New
Workers Party	Saqib Athar	170	4.8	New
Conservative	Princetta Nicol	161	4.6	▼3.6
Liberal Democrats	Joe Lynch	119	3.4	▼0.8
Communist	Alex Francis-Palmer	30	0.9	New
Majority		479	13.6	N/A
Turnout		3,510	26.9	▲7.8
Green gain from Labour		Swing		

==== May 2024 ====
2024
Party	Candidate	Votes	%	±%
Labour	Abdigafar Mohamed Muse	1,947	63.2	14.0 ▼
Green	Chris Perriam	528	17.1	7.7 ▲
Conservative	Princetta Nicol	329	10.7	2.2 ▲
Liberal Democrats	Bernie Ryan	233	7.6	2.6 ▲
Majority		1,419	46.0	
Rejected ballots		45	1.5	
Turnout		3,082	23.8	
Registered electors		12,956		
Labour hold		Swing	10.8 ▼	

==== May 2023 ====
2023 (2 vacancies)
Party	Candidate	Votes	%	±%
Labour	Amna Saad Omar Abdullatif*	2,033	72.4	▲1.2
Labour	Abdigafar Muse	1,705	60.7	▼10.5
Green	George Morris	342	12.2	▲2.0
Green	Niall Wright	272	9.7	▼0.5
Conservative	Princetta Nicol	247	8.8	▲1.6
Liberal Democrats	Abigail Bowden	215	7.7	▼2.5
Liberal Democrats	Norman Lewis	184	6.6	▼3.6
Conservative	Haider Raja	133	4.7	▼2.5
Majority				
Rejected ballots		15 (full); 3 (partial)		
Turnout		2,824	23.0	
Registered electors		12,279		
Labour hold		Swing		
Labour hold		Swing		

==== May 2022 ====
2022
Party	Candidate	Votes	%	±%
Labour	Tarjuah Hewitson*	1,936	78.8	6.8 ▲
Conservative	Callum Wood	201	8.2	0.3 ▼
Green	George Morris	199	8.1	4.2 ▼
Liberal Democrats	Melvin Sowah	104	4.2	1.9 ▼
Majority		1,735	71.1	
Rejected ballots		18		
Turnout		2,440	19.0	1.3 ▼
Registered electors		12,946		
Labour hold		Swing	3.6 ▲	

==== May 2021 ====
2021
Party	Candidate	Votes	%	±%
Labour	Bernard Priest*	2,324	77.2	6.7 ▼
Green	Kate Walsh Benson	280	9.3	4.3 ▲
Conservative	Callum Wood	256	8.5	0.1 ▼
Liberal Democrats	Luke Beamish	150	5.0	2.5 ▲
Majority		2,044	66.9	
Rejected ballots		39	1.3	
Turnout		3,049	24.18	5.1 ▲
Registered electors		12,608		
Labour hold		Swing	5.5 ▼	

=== Elections in 2010s ===
==== May 2019 ====
2019
Party	Candidate	Votes	%	±%
Labour	Amna Abdullatif	1,692	71.2	▲2.4
Liberal Democrats	George Rice	243	10.2	▲4.1
Green	Kara Ng	242	10.2	▼2.1
Conservative	Archie Galbraith	171	7.2	▲0.2
Majority		1,449	61.0	
Rejected ballots		28	1.18	
Turnout		2,376	19.04	▼1.2
Registered electors		12,480		
Labour hold		Swing	▼0.85	

==== May 2018 ====
2018 (3 vacancies; new boundaries)
Party	Candidate	Votes	%	±%
Labour	Tina Hewitson*	2,012	72.0	
Labour	Bernard Priest*	1,821	67.9	
Labour	Mavis Smitheman*	1,703	63.5	
Green	Samantha Goodchild	329	12.3	
Conservative	Rebecca Thompson	229	8.5	
Conservative	Shahzadi Begum	173	6.4	
Conservative	Sarah-Jane Trelfa	165	6.1	
Liberal Democrats	Beth Waller	163	6.1	
Majority				
Turnout		2,683	20.3	
Labour win (new boundaries)				
Labour win (new boundaries)				
Labour win (new boundaries)				

==== May 2016 ====
2016
Party	Candidate	Votes	%	±%
Labour	Tarjuah Tina Hewitson*	2,086	80.9	+0.5
Conservative	Akbar Ali Arif	185	7.2	+2.0
Green	Kara Ng	156	6.1	−0.7
Liberal Democrats	Charles Richard George Gadsden	79	3.1	−1.6
TUSC	John Neill	73	2.8	−0.2
Majority		1,901	73.7	
Turnout		2,579	25.28	
Labour hold		Swing		

==== May 2015 ====
2015
Party	Candidate	Votes	%	±%
Labour	Bernard Priest*	3,857	76.6	+0.4
Green	Steffeny McGiffen	546	10.8	N/A
Conservative	Will Coleshill	320	6.4	−2.2
Liberal Democrats	Lucinda Chamberlain	200	4.0	−4.5
TUSC	John Neill	110	2.2	−1.5
Majority		3,311	65.8	
Turnout		5,033	50.3	+28.7
Labour hold		Swing		

==== May 2014 ====
2014
Party	Candidate	Votes	%	±%
Labour	Mavis Smitheman*	2,163	72.41	+14.11
Green	Harriet Pugh	348	11.65	+5.55
TUSC	Alexander Dunbar	207	6.93	N/A
Liberal Democrats	Mumina Yeasmin Tahir	152	5.09	−20.01
Conservative	Joey Ferrigno	117	3.92	−6.58
Majority		1,815	60.8	
Turnout		2,987	23	
Labour hold		Swing		

==== November 2012 (by-election) ====
By-election: 15 November 2012
Party	Candidate	Votes	%	±%
Labour	Tina Hewitson	1,904	80.47	+0.09
Green	Karl Wardlaw	120	5.07	−1.72
Liberal Democrats	Liaquat Ali	94	3.97	−0.72
Conservative	Jamie Williams	92	3.89	−1.27
UKIP	Allison Newsham	61	2.58	N/A
TUSC	Shari Holden	52	2.20	−0.78
BNP	Steven Carden	43	1.82	N/A
Majority		1,784	75.40	
Turnout		2,395	20	
Labour hold		Swing		

==== May 2012 ====
2012
Party	Candidate	Votes	%	±%
Labour	Thomas O'Callaghan*	1,729	80.4	+18.3
Green	Patrick Sudlow	146	6.8	−.2
Conservative	Rob Manning	111	5.2	−6.4
Liberal Democrats	Susan Alman	101	4.7	−13.5
TUSC	Shari Holden	64	3.0	N/A
Majority		1,683	78.2	+34.2
Turnout		2,151	18.1	
Labour hold		Swing		

==== May 2011 ====
2011
Party	Candidate	Votes	%	±%
Labour	Bernard Priest*	2,054	76.2	+18.8
Conservative	Robert Manning	232	8.6	+1.3
Liberal Democrats	Liaqat Ali	229	8.5	−16.3
TUSC	James Naish	100	3.7	N/A
Socialist Equality	Robert Skelton	82	3.0	N/A
Majority		1,822	67.6	
Turnout		2,697	21.6	
Labour hold		Swing	+17.6	

==== May 2010 ====
2010
Party	Candidate	Votes	%	±%
Labour	Mavis Smitheman*	2,581	58.3	−3.8
Liberal Democrats	Asad Osman	1,112	25.1	+6.9
Conservative	Andrew Paul Hartley	463	10.5	−1.1
Green	Patrick Thomas Sudlow	271	6.1	−1.9
Majority		1,469	33.2	−10.8
Turnout		4,427	39.0	+21.1
Labour hold		Swing	-5.3	

=== Elections in 2000s ===
==== May 2008 ====
2008
Party	Candidate	Votes	%	±%
Labour	Tom O'Callaghan*	1,180	62.1	+4.7
Liberal Democrats	Mohammed Sajjad	346	18.2	−6.6
Conservative	Claire Babington	221	11.6	+4.3
Green	Andrew Speke	152	8.0	−2.6
Majority		836	44.0	+11.4
Turnout		1,899	17.9	−3.6
Labour hold		Swing	+5.6	

==== May 2007 ====
2007
Party	Candidate	Votes	%	±%
Labour	Bernard Priest*	1,219	57.4	−4.0
Liberal Democrats	Jawaid Chaudhry	526	24.8	+4.9
Green	Justine Hall	224	10.6	0
Conservative	Kashif Ali	155	7.3	−0.7
Majority		693	32.6	−8.8
Turnout		2,124	21.5	−0.2
Labour hold		Swing	-4.4	

==== May 2006 ====
2006
Party	Candidate	Votes	%	±%
Labour	Mavis Smitheman*	1,248	61.4	+15.7
Liberal Democrats	Mohammad Alam Panwar	405	19.9	−7.5
Green	Christopher David Charlton	216	10.6	−2.4
Conservative	Tadeusz Sochacki	163	8.0	+0.9
Majority		843	41.5	+23.2
Turnout		2,032	21.7	−2.7
Labour hold		Swing	+11.6	

==== June 2004 ====
2004 (3 vacancies; new boundaries)
Party	Candidate	Votes	%	±%
Labour	Thomas O'Callaghan*	1,162	47.8	
Labour	Bernard Priest*	1,029	42.4	
Labour	Mavis Smitheman*	992	40.8	
Liberal Democrats	Mohammad Panwar	697	28.7	
Liberal Democrats	Daniel Campbell	536	22.1	
Liberal Democrats	Joseph Podbylski	453	18.6	
Green	Hannah Berry	330	13.6	
Conservative	George Hemsley	181	7.5	
Conservative	Peter Hill	174	7.2	
Independent	Christopher Maloney	172	7.1	
Conservative	Raymond Wattenbach	160	6.6	
Majority		295	12.1	
Turnout		2,429	24.4	
Labour win (new seat)				
Labour win (new seat)				
Labour win (new seat)				

==== May 2003 ====
2003
Party	Candidate	Votes	%	±%
Labour	Bernard Priest*	806	66.1	−0.1
Liberal Democrats	Ilias Kazantzis	202	16.6	+2.8
Green	Hannah Berry	109	8.9	−3.0
Conservative	Raymond Wattenbach	102	8.4	+0.2
Majority		604	49.5	−2.9
Turnout		1,219	14.9	−1.6
Labour hold		Swing	-1.4	

==== May 2002 ====
2002
Party	Candidate	Votes	%	±%
Labour	Mavis Smitheman	942	66.2	−10.1
Liberal Democrats	Judith Durrell	196	13.8	+4.5
Green	Diane Norton	169	11.9	+6.4
Conservative	Ann Hodkinson	117	8.2	−0.6
Majority		746	52.4	−14.6
Turnout		1,424	16.5	+3.2
Labour hold		Swing	-7.3	

==== May 2000 ====
2000
Party	Candidate	Votes	%	±%
Labour	Thomas O'Callaghan*	776	76.3	+0.0
Liberal Democrats	Karen Farnen	95	9.3	−0.9
Conservative	Paul Kierman	90	8.8	−0.3
Green	Bruce Bingham	56	5.5	+1.1
Majority		681	67.0	+1.0
Turnout		1,017	13.3	−0.3
Labour hold		Swing	+0.4	

=== Elections in 1990s ===
==== May 1999 ====
1999
Party	Candidate	Votes	%	±%
Labour	Bernard Priest*	813	76.3	+10.3
Liberal Democrats	Derek Maloney	109	10.2	−1.7
Conservative	Fanny Davenport	97	9.1	−1.6
Green	Bruce Bingham	47	4.4	−1.3
Majority		704	66.0	+11.9
Turnout		1,066	13.6	
Labour hold		Swing	+5.9	

==== May 1998 ====
1998 (2 vacancies)
Party	Candidate	Votes	%	±%
Labour	Lawrence Murphy*	653	66.0	−10.5
Labour	Bernard Priest	577		
Liberal Democrats	Derek Maloney	118	11.9	+1.4
Liberal Democrats	David Gray	107		
Conservative	Fanny Davenport	106	10.7	+1.0
Conservative	John Davenport	97		
Green	Bruce Bingham	56	5.7	+2.4
Socialist Labour	Rachel Newton	56	5.7	+5.7
Majority		459	54.1	−12.0
Turnout		1,770		
Labour hold		Swing		
Labour hold		Swing	-5.9	

==== May 1996 ====
1996
Party	Candidate	Votes	%	±%
Labour	Thomas O'Callaghan	1,054	76.5	−0.9
Liberal Democrats	David Gray	144	10.5	+0.6
Conservative	John Davenport	133	9.7	+3.2
Green	Bruce Bingham	46	3.3	+3.3
Majority		910	66.1	−1.4
Turnout		1,377		
Labour hold		Swing	-0.7	

==== May 1995 ====
1995
Party	Candidate	Votes	%	±%
Labour	Irene Summers	1,222	77.4	+2.2
Liberal Democrats	S. Oliver	157	9.9	−8.2
Conservative	Ann Hodkinson	102	6.5	−0.2
Independent	S. O'Sullivan	97	6.1	+6.1
Majority		1,065	67.5	+10.3
Turnout		1,578		
Labour hold		Swing	+5.2	

==== May 1994 ====
1994
Party	Candidate	Votes	%	±%
Labour	L. Murphy	1,231	75.2	+2.6
Liberal Democrats	L. Ford	296	18.1	+9.8
Conservative	F. Roche	109	6.7	−8.1
Majority		935	57.2	−0.6
Turnout		1,636		
Labour hold		Swing	-3.6	

==== May 1992 ====
1992
Party	Candidate	Votes	%	±%
Labour	E. Hopkins*	1,010	72.6	+1.7
Conservative	M. Payne	206	14.8	+2.4
Liberal Democrats	L. Ford	115	8.3	−3.2
Green	A. Salter	61	4.4	−0.8
Majority		804	57.8	−0.7
Turnout		1,392		
Labour hold		Swing	-0.3	

==== May 1991 ====
1991
Party	Candidate	Votes	%	±%
Labour	N. I. Finley*	1,443	70.9	−7.8
Conservative	D. K. Lawrence	252	12.4	+3.6
Liberal Democrats	R. A. J. Axtell	235	11.5	+5.7
Green	P. E. Harrison	106	5.2	−1.5
Majority		1,191	58.5	−11.5
Turnout		2,036	25.5	
Labour hold		Swing	-5.7	

==== May 1990 ====
1990
Party	Candidate	Votes	%	±%
Labour	H. Barrett*	2,034	78.7	−0.1
Conservative	V. M. Colledge	227	8.8	−3.4
Green	D. A. Howarth	173	6.7	+3.8
Liberal Democrats	R. A. J. Axtell	149	5.8	−0.3
Majority		1,807	70.0	+3.4
Turnout		2,583		
Labour hold		Swing	+1.6	

=== Elections in 1980s ===
==== May 1988 ====
1988
Party	Candidate	Votes	%	±%
Labour	E. H. Hopkins	1,999	78.8	+11.8
Conservative	M. D. Payne	309	12.2	−3.9
SLD	K. V. Read	155	6.1	−10.8
Green	J. A. B. Hall	74	2.9	+2.9
Majority		1,690	66.6	+16.5
Turnout		2,537		
Labour hold		Swing	+7.8	

==== May 1987 ====
1987
Party	Candidate	Votes	%	±%
Labour	Norman Finley*	1,825	67.0	−9.5
Liberal	Ronald Axtell	460	16.9	+9.3
Conservative	Steven Johnson	438	16.1	+0.2
Majority		1,365	50.1	−10.4
Turnout		2,723		
Labour hold		Swing	-9.4	

==== May 1986 ====
1986
Party	Candidate	Votes	%	±%
Labour	H. Barrett*	2,040	79.4	+2.9
Conservative	J. Clough	276	10.7	−5.2
Liberal	R. Axtell	252	9.8	+2.2
Majority		1,764	68.7	+8.2
Turnout		2,568		
Labour hold		Swing	+4.0	

==== May 1984 ====
1984
Party	Candidate	Votes	%	±%
Labour	Frank Dale*	1,956	76.5	+0.9
Conservative	Stephen Lundy	408	15.9	+0.4
Liberal	Norman Allen	194	7.6	−1.2
Majority		1,548	60.5	+0.4
Turnout		2,558		
Labour hold		Swing	+0.2	

==== May 1983 ====
1983
Party	Candidate	Votes	%	±%
Labour	Norman Finley*	2,447	75.6	+3.4
Conservative	Stephen Lundy	503	15.5	−0.2
Liberal	Lauriston Ford	285	8.8	−3.2
Majority		1,944	60.1	+3.6
Turnout		3,235		
Labour hold		Swing	+1.8	

==== May 1982 ====
1982 (3 vacancies; new boundaries)
Party	Candidate	Votes	%	±%
Labour	Hugh Barrett*	1,936	67.9	
Labour	Frank Dale*	1,870	65.6	
Labour	Norman Finley*	1,806	63.3	
Conservative	Arthur Davies	422	14.8	
Conservative	John Alblas	389	13.6	
Conservative	Ian Savell	374	13.1	
Liberal	Delsya Redford	323	11.3	
Liberal	John Smith	314	11.0	
Liberal	Gunther Kloss	295	10.3	
Majority		1,384	48.5	
Turnout		2,851	27.4	
Labour win (new seat)				
Labour win (new seat)				
Labour win (new seat)				

==== May 1980 ====
1980
Party	Candidate	Votes	%	±%
Labour	F. Dale*	2,436	81.4	+22.9
Conservative	G. Taylor	441	14.7	−18.8
Liberal	J. Spittle	114	3.8	−4.2
Majority		1,995	66.7	+41.7
Turnout		2,991	29.2	−33.1
Labour hold		Swing	+20.8	

=== Elections in 1970s ===
==== May 1979 ====
1979
Party	Candidate	Votes	%	±%
Labour	N. I. Finley*	2,289	58.5	−12.0
Conservative	W. R. Swan	1,310	33.5	+7.2
Liberal	J. Spittle	315	8.0	+4.8
Majority		979	25.0	−19.2
Turnout		3,914	62.3	+34.6
Labour hold		Swing	-9.6	

==== May 1978 ====
1978
Party	Candidate	Votes	%	±%
Labour	H. Barrett*	2,102	70.5	+1.6
Conservative	W. R. Swan	783	26.3	−4.8
Liberal	D. Nicholson	96	3.2	+3.2
Majority		1,319	44.2	+6.5
Turnout		2,981	27.7	
Labour hold		Swing	+3.2	

==== May 1976 ====
1976
Party	Candidate	Votes	%	±%
Labour	F. Dale*	1,752	68.9	+1.1
Conservative	M. W. Coales	792	31.1	−1.1
Majority		960	37.8	+2.2
Turnout		2,544		
Labour hold		Swing	+1.1	

==== May 1975 ====
1975
Party	Candidate	Votes	%	±%
Labour	N. I. Finley*	1,082	67.8	−10.8
Conservative	L. H. Nield	515	32.2	+10.8
Majority		567	35.5	−21.6
Turnout		1,597		
Labour hold		Swing	-10.8	

==== May 1973 ====
1973 (3 vacancies; reorganisation)
Party	Candidate	Votes	%	±%
Labour	H. Barrett*	1,537	75.6	−2.6
Labour	F. Dale*	1,472	72.4	−5.8
Labour	N. I. Finley*	1,456	71.7	−6.5
Conservative	J. Kershaw	420	20.7	+2.6
Conservative	S. M. Lindsay	393	19.3	+1.2
Conservative	D. H. G. Penney	346	17.0	−1.1
Majority		1,036	51.0	−9.1
Turnout		2,032		
Labour hold		Swing		
Labour hold		Swing		
Labour hold		Swing		

==== May 1972 ====
1972
Party	Candidate	Votes	%	±%
Labour	H. Barrett*	2,097	78.2	−3.7
Conservative	G. Taylor	484	18.1	−1.1
Communist	R. Hughes	100	3.7	−3.5
Majority		1,613	60.1	+3.6
Turnout		2,681		
Labour hold		Swing		

==== May 1971 ====
1971 (3 vacancies; new boundaries)
Party	Candidate	Votes	%	±%
Labour	A. S. Goldstone*	2,887	81.9	
Labour	F. Dale	2,843	80.6	
Labour	H. Barrett*	2,669	75.7	
Conservative	D. Harrison	677	19.2	
Conservative	D. Taylor	655	18.6	
Conservative	G. Taylor	596	16.9	
Communist	R. Hughes	253	7.2	
Majority		1,992	56.5	
Turnout		3,527		
Labour win (new seat)				
Labour win (new seat)				
Labour win (new seat)				

==== May 1970 ====
1970
Party	Candidate	Votes	%	±%
Labour	A. S. Goldstone	914	65.1	+13.2
Conservative	D. Taylor*	491	34.9	−13.2
Majority		423	30.2	+26.4
Turnout		1,405		
Labour gain from Conservative		Swing		

=== Elections in 1960s ===
==== May 1969 ====
1969
Party	Candidate	Votes	%	±%
Labour	H. Barrett*	686	51.9	+9.8
Conservative	A. E. Welsby	636	48.1	−9.8
Majority		50	3.8	
Turnout		1,322		
Labour hold		Swing		

==== October 1968 (by-election) ====
By-election: 24 October 1968
Party	Candidate	Votes	%	±%
Labour	H. Barratt	750	60.7	+18.6
Conservative	A. E. Welsby	486	39.3	−18.6
Majority		264	21.4	
Turnout		1,236		
Labour hold		Swing		

==== May 1968 ====
1968
Party	Candidate	Votes	%	±%
Conservative	G. Taylor	666	57.9	+4.5
Labour	K. J. Hill*	484	42.1	−4.5
Majority		182	15.8	+9.0
Turnout		1,150		
Conservative gain from Labour		Swing		

==== May 1967 ====
1967
Party	Candidate	Votes	%	±%
Conservative	D. Taylor	570	53.4	−5.9
Labour	F. Taylor*	498	46.6	+5.9
Majority		72	6.8	−11.8
Turnout		1,068		
Conservative gain from Labour		Swing		

==== May 1966 ====
1966
Party	Candidate	Votes	%	±%
Labour	F. Taylor*	603	59.3	+3.1
Conservative	D. Taylor	414	40.7	+1.6
Majority		189	18.6	+1.6
Turnout		1,017		
Labour hold		Swing		

==== May 1965 ====
1965
Party	Candidate	Votes	%	±%
Labour	K. J. Hill*	963	56.1	−10.9
Conservative	J. A. Staton	671	39.1	+6.1
Union Movement	G. S. Gee	83	4.8	N/A
Majority		292	17.0	−17.0
Turnout		1,717		
Labour hold		Swing		

==== May 1964 ====
1964
Party	Candidate	Votes	%	±%
Labour	W. Parkinson*	1,475	67.0	−12.3
Conservative	J. A. Staton	726	33.0	+12.3
Majority		749	34.0	−24.6
Turnout		2,201		
Labour hold		Swing		

==== November 1963 (by-election) ====
By-election: 21 November 1963
Party	Candidate	Votes	%	±%
Labour	K. J. Hill	1,117	54.1	−25.2
Conservative	J. A. Staton	768	37.2	+16.5
Liberal	D. Armstrong	180	8.7	N/A
Majority		349	16.9	−41.7
Turnout		2,065		
Labour hold		Swing		

==== May 1963 ====
1963
Party	Candidate	Votes	%	±%
Labour	F. Taylor*	1,851	79.3	+9.4
Conservative	W. Ricketts	482	20.7	−9.4
Majority		1,369	58.6	+18.8
Turnout		2,333		
Labour hold		Swing		

==== May 1962 ====
1962
Party	Candidate	Votes	%	±%
Labour	V. Wilson*	1,842	69.9	−2.3
Conservative	G. Taylor	794	30.1	+2.3
Majority		1,048	39.8	−4.8
Turnout		2,636		
Labour hold		Swing		

==== May 1961 ====
1961
Party	Candidate	Votes	%	±%
Labour	W. Parkinson*	1,625	72.2	+9.0
Conservative	W. N. Fleetwood	625	27.8	−9.0
Majority		1,000	44.4	+18.0
Turnout		2,250		
Labour hold		Swing		

==== May 1960 ====
1960
Party	Candidate	Votes	%	±%
Labour	F. Taylor*	1,525	63.2	0
Conservative	G. Taylor	887	36.8	0
Majority		638	26.4	0
Turnout		2,412		
Labour hold		Swing		

=== Elections in 1950s ===
==== May 1959 ====
1959
Party	Candidate	Votes	%	±%
Labour	V. Wilson*	2,216	63.2	+0.2
Conservative	G. Taylor	1,288	36.8	−0.2
Majority		928	26.4	+0.4
Turnout		3,504		
Labour hold		Swing		

==== May 1958 ====
1958
Party	Candidate	Votes	%	±%
Labour	W. M. Parkinson*	1,582	63.0	−7.4
Conservative	G. Taylor	929	37.0	+7.4
Majority		653	26.0	−14.8
Turnout		2,511		
Labour hold		Swing		

==== May 1957 ====
1957
Party	Candidate	Votes	%	±%
Labour	F. Taylor*	2,461	70.4	+7.2
Conservative	G. Jackson	1,033	29.6	−7.2
Majority		1,428	40.8	+14.4
Turnout		3,494		
Labour hold		Swing		

==== May 1956 ====
1956
Party	Candidate	Votes	%	±%
Labour	V. Wilson*	2,319	63.2	+0.6
Conservative	G. Jackson	1,352	36.8	−0.6
Majority		967	26.4	+1.2
Turnout		3,671		
Labour hold		Swing		

==== May 1955 ====
1955
Party	Candidate	Votes	%	±%
Labour	W. M. Parkinson*	2,844	62.6	+4.0
Conservative	L. Hogg	1,701	37.4	−4.0
Majority		1,143	25.2	+8.0
Turnout		4,545		
Labour hold		Swing		

==== May 1954 ====
1954
Party	Candidate	Votes	%	±%
Labour	F. Taylor	3,569	58.6	−2.3
Conservative	P. Buckley*	2,526	41.4	+2.3
Majority		1,043	17.2	−4.6
Turnout		6,095		
Labour gain from Conservative		Swing		

==== May 1953 ====
1953
Party	Candidate	Votes	%	±%
Labour	V. Wilson*	3,502	60.9	0
Conservative	L. Hogg	2,248	39.1	0
Majority		1,254	21.8	0
Turnout		5,750		
Labour hold		Swing		

==== May 1952 ====
1952
Party	Candidate	Votes	%	±%
Labour	W. Parkins	4,441	60.9	+18.9
Conservative	T. Dobbins*	2,847	39.1	−18.9
Majority		1,594	21.8	
Turnout		7,288		
Labour gain from Conservative		Swing		

==== May 1951 ====
1951
Party	Candidate	Votes	%	±%
Conservative	P. Buckley*	3,697	58.0	+12.3
Labour	P. Roddy	2,674	42.0	−12.3
Majority		1,023	16.0	
Turnout		6,371		
Conservative hold		Swing		

==== May 1950 ====
1950 (new boundaries)
Party	Candidate	Votes	%	±%
Labour	V. Wilson*	3,749	54.3	
Conservative	J. Davies	3,153	45.7	
Majority		596	8.6	
Turnout		6,902		
Labour hold		Swing		

=== Elections in 1940s ===
==== May 1949 ====
1949
Party	Candidate	Votes	%	±%
Conservative	T. Dobbins*	3,583	50.5	−4.5
Labour	V. Wilson	3,507	49.5	+4.5
Majority		76	1.0	−9.0
Turnout		7,090		
Conservative hold		Swing		

==== November 1947 ====
1947
Party	Candidate	Votes	%	±%
Conservative	P. Buckley*	3,917	55.0	+6.2
Labour	J. Singleton	3,200	45.0	−6.2
Majority		717	10.0	
Turnout		7,117		
Conservative hold		Swing		

==== November 1946 ====
1946
Party	Candidate	Votes	%	±%
Labour	H. Humphreys	2,974	51.2	−0.6
Conservative	N. Beer*	2,836	48.8	+0.6
Majority		138	2.4	−1.2
Turnout		5,810		
Labour gain from Conservative		Swing		

==== November 1945 ====
1945
Party	Candidate	Votes	%	±%
Labour	J. McGrath*	2,537	51.8	+8.2
Conservative	T. Dobbins	2,362	48.2	−5.9
Majority		175	3.6	
Turnout		4,899	40.0	
Labour hold		Swing		

=== Elections in 1930s ===
==== November 1938 ====
1938
Party	Candidate	Votes	%	±%
Conservative	J. Dook	2,080	55.1	+2.1
Labour	J. M. Wharton*	1,648	43.6	−3.4
Independent	F. G. Hunt	48	1.3	N/A
Majority		432	11.5	+5.5
Turnout		3,776		
Conservative gain from Labour		Swing		

==== September 1938 (by-election) ====
By-election: 1 September 1938
Party	Candidate	Votes	%	±%
Conservative	J. McGrath	1,737	51.7	−1.3
Labour	F. Helme	1,270	37.8	+9.2
Independent Labour	J. T. Wolfenden	352	10.5	N/A
Majority		467	13.9	+7.9
Turnout		3,359		
Conservative hold		Swing		

==== November 1937 ====
1937
Party	Candidate	Votes	%	±%
Conservative	N. Beer	2,471	53.0	−9.6
Labour	J. T. Wolfenden*	2,191	47.0	+9.6
Majority		280	6.0	−19.2
Turnout		4,662		
Conservative gain from Labour		Swing		

==== November 1936 ====
1936
Party	Candidate	Votes	%	±%
Conservative	M. L. K. Jones*	3,334	62.6	+18.8
Labour	F. Helme	1,994	37.4	−18.8
Majority		1,340	25.2	
Turnout		5,328		
Conservative hold		Swing		

==== November 1935 ====
1935
Party	Candidate	Votes	%	±%
Labour	J. M. Wharton*	2,285	56.2	+1.5
Conservative	G. Moores	1,782	43.8	−1.5
Majority		503	12.4	+3.0
Turnout		4,067		
Labour hold		Swing		

==== November 1934 ====
1934
Party	Candidate	Votes	%	±%
Labour	J. T. Wolfenden	2,452	54.7	+5.2
Conservative	G. Grocock*	2,028	45.3	−5.2
Majority		424	9.4	
Turnout		4,480		
Labour gain from Conservative		Swing		

==== November 1933 ====
1933
Party	Candidate	Votes	%	±%
Conservative	M. L. K. Jones*	2,553	50.5	+6.3
Labour	J. T. Wolfenden	2,506	49.5	−6.3
Majority		47	1.0	
Turnout		5,059		
Conservative hold		Swing		

==== November 1932 ====
1932
Party	Candidate	Votes	%	±%
Labour	J. M. Wharton*	2,466	55.8	+17.8
Conservative	C. A. Baylem	1,955	44.2	−17.8
Majority		511	11.6	
Turnout		4,421		
Labour hold		Swing		

==== November 1931 ====
1931
Party	Candidate	Votes	%	±%
Conservative	G. Grocock	3,399	62.0	−0.6
Labour	W. Onions	2,080	38.0	+0.6
Majority		1,319	24.0	−1.2
Turnout		5,479	50.8	
Conservative gain from Labour		Swing		

==== November 1930 ====
1930
Party	Candidate	Votes	%	±%
Conservative	M. L. K. Jones*	3,355	62.6	+23.3
Labour	T. M. Larrad	2,003	37.4	−23.3
Majority		1,352	25.2	
Turnout		5,358		
Conservative hold		Swing		

=== Elections in 1920s ===
==== November 1929 ====
1929
Party	Candidate	Votes	%	±%
Labour	J. M. Wharton*	2,404	60.7	+17.1
Conservative	G. Grocock	1,556	39.3	−16.8
Majority		848	21.4	
Turnout		3,960	36.5	−24.0
Labour hold		Swing		

==== November 1928 ====
1928
Party	Candidate	Votes	%	±%
Conservative	J. Whittle	3,495	56.1	+0.9
Labour	W. McMullan	2,713	43.6	−1.2
Residents	A. R. Edwards	17	0.3	N/A
Majority		782	12.5	+2.1
Turnout		6,225	60.5	+4.5
Conservative gain from Labour		Swing		

==== November 1927 ====
1927
Party	Candidate	Votes	%	±%
Conservative	M. L. K. Jones*	3,209	55.2	+7.8
Labour	W. McMullan	2,600	44.8	−7.8
Majority		609	10.4	
Turnout		5,576	56.0	+2.4
Conservative hold		Swing		

==== November 1926 ====
1926
Party	Candidate	Votes	%	±%
Labour	J. M. Wharton	2,935	52.6	−1.2
Conservative	A. E. B. Alexander*	2,641	47.4	+1.2
Majority		294	5.2	−2.4
Turnout		5,576	53.6	−7.2
Labour gain from Conservative		Swing		

==== November 1925 ====
1925
Party	Candidate	Votes	%	±%
Labour	H. Weate*	3,401	53.8	+9.0
Conservative	J. Whittle	2,925	46.2	−9.0
Majority		476	7.6	
Turnout		6,326	60.8	
Labour hold		Swing		

==== November 1924 ====
1924
Party	Candidate	Votes	%	±%
Conservative	M. L. K. Jones*	3,381	55.2	+4.1
Labour	J. M. Wharton	2,748	44.8	−4.1
Majority		633	10.4	
Turnout		6,129		
Conservative hold		Swing		

==== November 1923 ====
1923
Party	Candidate	Votes	%	±%
Conservative	A. E. B. Alexander*	2,739	51.1	+7.4
Labour	J. M. Wharton	2,619	48.9	−7.4
Majority		120	2.2	
Turnout		5,358		
Conservative hold		Swing		

==== November 1922 ====
1922
Party	Candidate	Votes	%	±%
Labour	H. Weate*	3,421	56.3	+8.1
Conservative	J. L. Barrett	2,650	43.7	−8.1
Majority		771	12.6	
Turnout		6,071	58.9	+10.9
Labour hold		Swing		

==== November 1921 ====
1921
Party	Candidate	Votes	%	±%
Conservative	M. L. K. Jones	2,536	51.8	−18.4
Labour	R. C. Wallhead*	2,363	48.2	+18.4
Majority		173	3.4	−37.0
Turnout		4,899	48.0	+12.4
Conservative gain from Labour		Swing		

==== November 1920 ====
1920
Party	Candidate	Votes	%	±%
Conservative	A. E. B. Alexander*	2,580	70.2	+35.3
Labour	G. H. Harris	1,096	29.8	−35.3
Majority		1,484	40.4	
Turnout		3,676	35.6	+0.6
Conservative hold		Swing		

=== Elections in 1910s ===
==== November 1919 (by-election) ====
By-election: 24 November 1919
Party	Candidate	Votes	%	±%
Labour	R. C. Wallhead	1,683	50.1	−15.0
Conservative	J. E. Chapman	1,678	49.9	+15.0
Majority		5	0.2	−30.0
Turnout		3,361	33.7	−1.3
Labour hold		Swing		

==== November 1919 ====
1919 (new boundaries)
Party	Candidate	Votes	%	±%
Labour	H. Weate	2,355	65.1	
Conservative	J. E. Chapman*	1,264	34.9	
Majority		1,091	30.2	
Turnout		3,619	35.0	
Labour gain from Conservative		Swing		

==== November 1914 ====
1914
Party	Candidate	Votes	%	±%
Labour	J. M. McLachlan*	uncontested		
Labour hold		Swing		

==== November 1913 ====
1913
Party	Candidate	Votes	%	±%
Conservative	K. W. Jones	uncontested		
Conservative hold		Swing		

==== November 1912 ====
1912
Party	Candidate	Votes	%	±%
Conservative	J. E. Chapman*	2,015	57.8	+9.2
Labour	F. Lowe	977	28.0	−23.4
Liberal	J. M. Bernstein	494	14.2	N/A
Majority		1,038	29.8	
Turnout		3,486		
Conservative hold		Swing		

==== November 1911 ====
1911
Party	Candidate	Votes	%	±%
Labour	J. M. McLachlan	1,974	51.4	+17.5
Conservative	A. Hailwood*	1,867	48.6	+13.5
Majority		107	2.8	
Turnout		3,841		
Labour gain from Conservative		Swing		

==== November 1910 ====
1910
Party	Candidate	Votes	%	±%
Conservative	F. Sturgess	1,333	35.1	−15.4
Labour	J. M. McLachlan	1,288	33.9	−15.6
Liberal	F. Smith	1,176	31.0	N/A
Majority		45	1.2	+0.2
Turnout		3,797		
Conservative hold		Swing		

=== Elections in 1900s ===
==== November 1909 ====
1909
Party	Candidate	Votes	%	±%
Conservative	J. E. Chapman	2,023	50.5	−1.0
Labour	J. Doyle*	1,982	49.5	+1.0
Majority		41	1.0	−2.0
Turnout		4,005		
Conservative gain from Labour		Swing		

==== November 1908 ====
1908
Party	Candidate	Votes	%	±%
Conservative	J. Stewart*	2,055	51.5	−5.4
Labour	T. Lowth	1,935	48.5	+7.7
Majority		120	3.0	−13.1
Turnout		3,990		
Conservative hold		Swing		

==== November 1907 ====
1907
Party	Candidate	Votes	%	±%
Conservative	J. Smith	2,231	56.9	+9.5
Labour	T. Lowth*	1,600	40.8	−11.8
Independent	A. R. Brown	89	2.3	N/A
Majority		631	16.1	
Turnout		3,920		
Conservative gain from Labour		Swing		

==== November 1906 ====
1906
Party	Candidate	Votes	%	±%
Labour	J. Doyle*	1,488	52.6	+19.4
Conservative	J. W. White	1,341	47.4	−19.4
Majority		147	5.2	
Turnout		2,829		
Labour hold		Swing		

==== November 1905 ====
1905
Party	Candidate	Votes	%	±%
Conservative	J. Stewart*	1,950	66.8	+25.5
Labour	R. Robinson	967	33.2	−25.5
Majority		983	33.6	
Turnout		2,917		
Conservative hold		Swing		

==== November 1904 ====
1904
Party	Candidate	Votes	%	±%
Labour	T. Lowth	2,239	58.7	N/A
Conservative	J. E. Chapman	1,575	41.3	−2.7
Majority		664	17.4	
Turnout		3,814		
Labour gain from Conservative		Swing		

==== November 1903 ====
1903
Party	Candidate	Votes	%	±%
Independent	R. Hughes	2,368	54.0	+4.1
Conservative	W. Hyde	1,932	44.0	−6.1
Ind. Conservative	J. W. White	86	2.0	N/A
Majority		436	10.0	
Turnout		4,386		
Independent gain from Conservative		Swing		

==== November 1902 ====
1902
Party	Candidate	Votes	%	±%
Conservative	J. Stewart*	1,516	50.1	−19.1
Independent	R. Hughes	1,511	49.9	+19.1
Majority		5	0.2	−38.2
Turnout		3,027		
Conservative hold		Swing		

==== December 1901 (by-election) ====
By-election: 23 December 1901
Party	Candidate	Votes	%	±%
Conservative	J. Stewart	1,013	62.0	−7.2
Liberal	S. H. Cox	620	38.0	N/A
Majority		393	24.0	−14.4
Turnout		1,633		
Conservative hold		Swing		

==== November 1901 ====
1901
Party	Candidate	Votes	%	±%
Conservative	S. Chesters Thompson*	1,705	69.2	+14.8
Independent	R. Hughes	758	30.8	N/A
Majority		947	38.4	+29.6
Turnout		2,463		
Conservative hold		Swing		

==== November 1900 ====
1900
Party	Candidate	Votes	%	±%
Conservative	J. Whittaker*	1,629	54.4	−3.5
Labour	G. Wearing	1,368	45.6	N/A
Majority		261	8.8	−7.0
Turnout		2,997		
Conservative hold		Swing		

=== Elections in 1890s ===
==== November 1899 ====
1899
Party	Candidate	Votes	%	±%
Conservative	W. Pollitt*	1,771	57.9	N/A
Liberal	W. M. Westerby	1,286	42.1	N/A
Majority		485	15.8	N/A
Turnout		3,057		
Conservative hold		Swing		

==== February 1899 (by-election) ====
By-election: 2 February 1899
Party	Candidate	Votes	%	±%
Conservative	S. Chesters Thompson	uncontested		
Conservative hold		Swing		

==== November 1898 ====
1898
Party	Candidate	Votes	%	±%
Conservative	S. Chesters Thompson*	uncontested		
Conservative hold		Swing		

==== November 1897 ====
1897
Party	Candidate	Votes	%	±%
Conservative	J. Whittaker	2,358	56.4	+4.9
Liberal	J. Shaw	1,821	43.6	−4.9
Majority		537	12.8	+9.8
Turnout		4,179		
Conservative hold		Swing		

==== March 1897 (by-election) ====
By-election: 16 March 1897
Party	Candidate	Votes	%	±%
Conservative	S. Chesters Thompson	2,630	79.0	+27.5
Liberal	R. A. Brown	698	21.0	−27.5
Majority		1,932	58.0	+55.0
Turnout		3,328		
Conservative hold		Swing		

==== November 1896 ====
1896
Party	Candidate	Votes	%	±%
Conservative	W. Pollitt*	1,883	51.5	N/A
Liberal	J. Shaw	1,774	48.5	N/A
Majority		109	3.0	N/A
Turnout		3,657		
Conservative hold		Swing		

==== November 1895 ====
1895
Party	Candidate	Votes	%	±%
Conservative	R. C. Smith*	uncontested		
Conservative hold		Swing		

==== November 1894 ====
1894
Party	Candidate	Votes	%	±%
Conservative	W. Fitzgerald*	2,306	61.4	+6.3
Liberal	R. A. Brown	1,448	38.6	−6.3
Majority		858	22.8	+12.6
Turnout		3,754		
Conservative hold		Swing		

==== November 1893 ====
1893
Party	Candidate	Votes	%	±%
Conservative	W. Pollitt	2,083	55.1	N/A
Liberal	H. Matthews	1,697	44.9	N/A
Majority		386	10.2	N/A
Turnout		3,780		
Conservative hold		Swing		

==== November 1892 ====
1892
Party	Candidate	Votes	%	±%
Liberal Unionist	R. C. Smith*	uncontested		
Liberal Unionist hold		Swing		

==== November 1891 ====
1891
Party	Candidate	Votes	%	±%
Conservative	W. Fitzgerald*	2,282	57.0	N/A
Liberal	H. Matthews	1,723	43.0	N/A
Majority		559	14.0	N/A
Turnout		4,005		
Conservative hold		Swing		

==== September 1891 (by-election) ====
By-election: 22 September 1891
Party	Candidate	Votes	%	±%
Liberal Unionist	R. C. Smith	uncontested		
Liberal Unionist gain from Conservative		Swing		

==== April 1891 (by-election) ====
By-election: 20 April 1891
Party	Candidate	Votes	%	±%
Conservative	W. Fitzgerald	1,804	52.3	−6.5
Liberal	J. Shaw	1,644	47.7	+6.5
Majority		160	4.6	−13.0
Turnout		3,448		
Conservative hold		Swing		

==== March 1891 (by-election) ====
By-election: 20 March 1891
Party	Candidate	Votes	%	±%
Conservative	S. Chesters	2,058	58.8	N/A
Lib-Lab	M. Arrandale	1,442	41.2	N/A
Majority		616	17.6	N/A
Turnout		3,500		
Conservative hold		Swing		

==== November 1890 ====
1890
Party	Candidate	Votes	%	±%
Conservative	E. Tatton*	uncontested		
Conservative hold		Swing		

=== Elections in 1880s ===
==== November 1889 ====
1889
Party	Candidate	Votes	%	±%
Conservative	S. Chesters Thompson*	2,596	68.6	N/A
Liberal	J. H. Whitehouse	1,187	31.4	N/A
Majority		1,409	37.2	N/A
Turnout		3,783		
Conservative hold		Swing		

==== November 1888 ====
1888
Party	Candidate	Votes	%	±%
Conservative	J. Hinchliffe*	uncontested		
Conservative hold		Swing		

==== November 1887 ====
1887
Party	Candidate	Votes	%	±%
Conservative	E. Tatton	2,065	57.7	N/A
Liberal	J. H. Crosfield*	1,516	42.3	N/A
Majority		549	15.4	N/A
Turnout		3,581		
Conservative gain from Liberal		Swing		

==== November 1886 ====
1886
Party	Candidate	Votes	%	±%
Conservative	S. Chesters Thompson*	uncontested		
Conservative hold		Swing		

==== November 1885 ====
1885 (new boundaries)
Party	Candidate	Votes	%	±%
Conservative	J. Hinchliffe*	uncontested		
Conservative hold		Swing		

==== November 1884 ====
1884
Party	Candidate	Votes	%	±%
Liberal	J. H. Crosfield	2,030	50.8	N/A
Conservative	S. P. Bidder	1,966	49.2	N/A
Majority		64	1.6	N/A
Turnout		3,996		
Liberal gain from Conservative		Swing		

==== November 1883 ====
1883
Party	Candidate	Votes	%	±%
Conservative	S. Chesters Thompson*	uncontested		
Conservative hold		Swing		

==== November 1882 ====
1882
Party	Candidate	Votes	%	±%
Conservative	J. Hinchliffe*	uncontested		
Conservative hold		Swing		

==== November 1881 ====
1881
Party	Candidate	Votes	%	±%
Conservative	J. Whittaker	2,139	53.9	N/A
Liberal	W. H. Hewitt	1,827	46.1	N/A
Majority		312	7.8	N/A
Turnout		3,966		
Conservative hold		Swing		

==== November 1880 ====
1880
Party	Candidate	Votes	%	±%
Conservative	S. Chesters Thompson*	uncontested		
Conservative hold		Swing		

=== Elections in 1870s ===
==== November 1879 ====
1879
Party	Candidate	Votes	%	±%
Conservative	J. Hinchliffe	uncontested		
Conservative hold		Swing		

==== November 1878 ====
1878
Party	Candidate	Votes	%	±%
Conservative	G. H. Midwood*	uncontested		
Conservative hold		Swing		

==== November 1877 ====
1877
Party	Candidate	Votes	%	±%
Liberal	J. Thompson*	uncontested		
Liberal hold		Swing		

==== November 1876 ====
1876
Party	Candidate	Votes	%	±%
Conservative	R. K. Payne*	uncontested		
Conservative hold		Swing		

==== November 1875 ====
1875
Party	Candidate	Votes	%	±%
Conservative	G. H. Midwood	uncontested		
Conservative hold		Swing		

==== November 1874 ====
1874
Party	Candidate	Votes	%	±%
Liberal	J. Thompson*	uncontested		
Liberal hold		Swing		

==== November 1873 ====
1873
Party	Candidate	Votes	%	±%
Conservative	R. K. Payne	1,945	58.8	−2.3
Liberal	C. Preston	1,270	38.4	−0.5
Independent	H. Payne	35	1.0	N/A
Independent	J. Buxton Payne	30	0.9	N/A
Independent	J. Brown Payne	29	0.9	N/A
Majority		675	20.4	−1.8
Turnout		3,309		
Conservative gain from Liberal		Swing		

==== November 1872 ====
1872
Party	Candidate	Votes	%	±%
Conservative	R. Whittaker*	1,672	61.1	
Liberal	H. Shaw	1,066	38.9	
Majority		606	22.2	
Turnout		2,738		
Conservative hold		Swing		

=== Elections in 1840s ===
==== November 1845 ====
1845
Party	Candidate	Votes	%	±%
Liberal	James Thompson*	uncontested		
Liberal hold		Swing		

==== November 1844 ====
1844
Party	Candidate	Votes	%	±%
Liberal	Henry Lees	uncontested		
Liberal hold		Swing		

==== November 1843 ====
1843
Party	Candidate	Votes	%	±%
Liberal	Edmund Peel Thomson*	172	76.8	N/A
Liberal	John Marshall	52	23.2	N/A
Majority		120	53.6	N/A
Turnout		224		
Liberal hold		Swing		

==== November 1842 ====
1842
Party	Candidate	Votes	%	±%
Liberal	James Thompson	uncontested		
Liberal hold		Swing		

==== November 1841 ====
1841
Party	Candidate	Votes	%	±%
Liberal	William Benjamin Watkins*	uncontested		
Liberal hold		Swing		

==== November 1840 ====
1840
Party	Candidate	Votes	%	±%
Liberal	Paul Ferdinand Willert*	uncontested		
Liberal hold		Swing		

=== Elections in 1830s ===
==== November 1839 ====
1839
Party	Candidate	Votes	%	±%
Liberal	Aaron Nodal*	uncontested		
Liberal hold		Swing		

==== December 1838 ====
1838 (3 vacancies)
Party	Candidate	Votes	%	±%
Liberal	William Benjamin Watkins	186	100.0	
Liberal	Paul Ferdinand Willert	185	99.5	
Liberal	Aaron Nodal	181	97.3	
Turnout		186		
Liberal win (new seat)				
Liberal win (new seat)				
Liberal win (new seat)				

== See also ==
- Manchester City Council
- Manchester City Council elections
