= J. M. McLachlan =

British politician

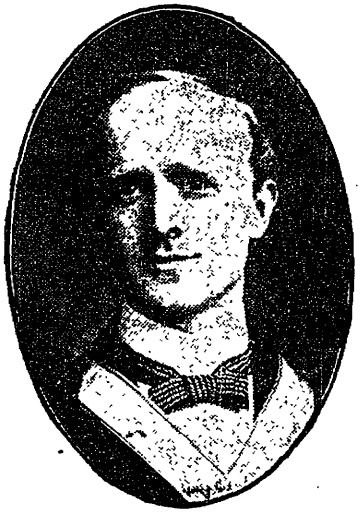
McLachlan in 1909

John McKean McLachlan (27 August 1873 – 29 December 1930) was a British socialist politician.

McLachlan was elected to Levenshulme District Council in the early-1900s. He first became prominent as a left-wing member of the Independent Labour Party (ILP); at its 1906 conference, he was the lead opponent of a motion against military service, holding that such training would assist with building a citizen's army.

During 1908, McLachlan supported Victor Grayson's independent "Right to Work" candidates for Manchester City Council, and also campaigned for Dan Irving of the Social Democratic Federation (SDF) at the 1908 Manchester North West by-election. McLachlan himself stood in Ardwick for the city council in 1909, and was elected. Despite this, it was a surprise when he was adopted as the official Labour Party candidate for Manchester South West at the January 1910 general election. He took only 16.6% of the vote, and was not elected.

McLachlan was elected to the National Administrative Council (NAC) of the ILP in 1909, along with other left-wingers, including Leonard Hall and Russell Smart. Concerned about the direction of the Labour Party under Ramsay MacDonald and the ILP's role in this, McLachlan compiled a document entitled Let us reform the Labour Party, but generally known as the Green Manifesto, with contributions from co-thinkers including Hall, C. T. Douthwaite and J. H. Belcher.

In 1911, the SDF formed the new British Socialist Party, hoping that dissidents on the left of the ILP would join. Although Douthwaite left to join the new party, McLachlan opted to remain in the ILP and work with G. H. Stuart on the NAC. They formed part of a broader left including George Lansbury and Keir Hardie, but the resignations of Lansbury and Hardie from the council in 1912 left them isolated.

By 1919, McLachlan was suffering with poor health, and resigned his seat on the council; R. C. Wallhead won the election to succeed him. His health did not improve, and he underwent a major operation in 1924, and it was noted in the Manchester Guardian that he received a blood transfusion during it.

Party political offices
Preceded by New position	Midlands Division representative on the National Administrative Council of the Independent Labour Party; 1909–1912	Succeeded by Position abolished
