= Albert Alexander Sr. =

English football executive (1867–1953)

Member of Manchester City Council for Ardwick ward
- In office 4 September 1918 – 1 November 1926
- Preceded by: Dr. Kingsmill Jones
- Succeeded by: J. M. Wharton

Personal details
- Born: Albert Edward Burns Alexander; 21 September 1867 Hulme, Manchester, England, UK
- Died: 14 October 1953 (aged 86)
- Party: Conservative

Albert Edward Burns Alexander Sr. (21 September 1867 – 14 October 1953) was an English businessman, football administrator, and local politician who held several roles at Manchester City F.C..

== Early life and career ==
Born in Hulme, Alexander was one of four sons involved in the coach proprietorship business. He lived in Ardwick from 1871 to at least the 1920s, having married a storekeeper's daughter, Evelyn Bridge, in St Matthew's there in June 1891.

== Football ==
Alexander's connections with Manchester City go back to at least 1904. That year Manchester City reached the FA Cup final for the first time. The club directors hired a horse-drawn carriage to make the journey to London, with Alexander as the driver. By the 1920s, Alexander was the club's vice-chairman, and had also formed and coached the "A" team, the club's first youth development side.

In 1925 manager David Ashworth resigned. Unable to find a suitable replacement, the directors selected the team by committee. Alexander led the panel with assistance from figures including Lawrence Furniss and Wilf Wild. Under the Alexander-led committee the club achieved a record 6–1 Manchester derby win, and reached the 1926 FA Cup Final, though City were defeated 1–0 by Bolton Wanderers. On 26 April 1926, Peter Hodge was appointed manager, and Alexander's period in charge came to an end.

== Local politics ==
Alexander's first venture into politics took place in November 1913 when he unsuccessfully stood in St. Luke's ward for the Conservative Party at the Manchester City Council elections. In September 1918, he was appointed to fill a vacancy in Ardwick ward caused by the death of Councillor Dr. Kingsmill Jones. Alexander was re-elected in 1920, and again in 1923, but lost his seat to J. M. Wharton of the Labour Party in 1926. A further defeat at a by-election in Moss Side East ward marked the end of Alexander's municipal career.

Albert Alexander was not the only figure associated with Manchester City F.C. to become involved with local politics in Manchester. Stephen Chesters Thompson, who was honorary president of Ardwick A.F.C. in the 1890s, was also a Conservative councillor in Ardwick; John Allison, who was briefly chairman of Manchester City F.C. in 1905, was a Liberal councillor in St. Mark's ward between 1902 and 1916; Johnny McMahon, who won the F.A. Cup with Manchester City F.C. in 1904, was a Conservative councillor in All Saints' ward from 1931 until his death in 1933; Chris Muir, who was a director of the club, was a Labour councillor in Baguley ward from 1971 until 1975 and later contested elections for the Liberal Democrats.

== Personal life ==
Alexander's son, Albert Victor, was Manchester City chairman in the 1960s, and through Albert Jr. and his son Eric the Alexander family had a presence on the club board until 1972.
