= 1923 Manchester City Council election =

Local election in Manchester

- 1 November 1923

35 of 140 seats on Manchester City Council 71 seats needed for a majority
	First party	Second party	Third party
Party	Conservative	Liberal	Labour
Last election	15 seats, 43.2%	8 seats, 8.8%	10 seats, 39.7%
Seats before	75	34	26
Seats won	17	7	10
Seats after	75	32	28
Seat change	Steady	▼2	▲2
Popular vote	54,724	18,842	41,625
Percentage	45.3%	15.6%	34.4%
Swing	▲2.1%	▲6.8%	▼5.3%
	Fourth party
Party	Independent
Last election	2 seats, 6.0%
Seats before	5
Seats won	1
Seats after	5
Seat change	Steady
Popular vote	3,859
Percentage	3.2%
Swing	▼2.8%
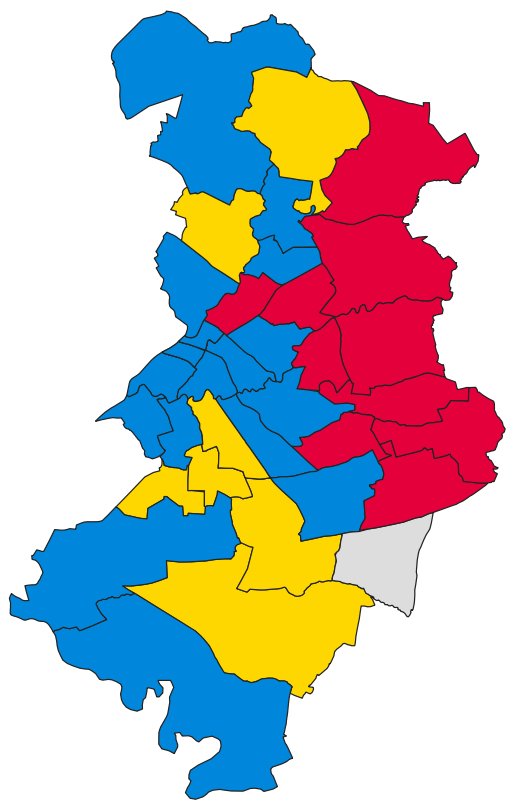
- Map of results of 1923 election
Leader of the Council before election
Conservative
Leader of the Council after election
Conservative

Elections to Manchester City Council were held on Thursday, 1 November 1923. One third of the councillors seats were up for election, with each successful candidate to serve a three-year term of office. The Conservative Party retained overall control of the council.

== Election result ==
Party	Votes		Seats			Full Council	
Conservative Party	54,724 (45.3%)	▲2.1	17 (48.6%)	17 / 35	Steady	75 (53.6%)	75 / 140
Liberal Party	18,842 (15.6%)	▲6.8	7 (20.0%)	7 / 35	▼2	32 (22.9%)	32 / 140
Labour Party	41,625 (34.4%)	▼5.3	10 (28.6%)	10 / 35	▲2	28 (20.0%)	28 / 140
Independent	3,859 (3.2%)	▼2.8	1 (2.9%)	1 / 35	Steady	5 (3.6%)	5 / 140
Co-operative Party	1,772 (1.5%)	N/A	0 (0.0%)	0 / 35	N/A	0 (0.0%)	0 / 140
NFDDSS	57 (0.0%)	N/A	0 (0.0%)	0 / 35	N/A	0 (0.0%)	0 / 140

=== Full council ===
↓
28	32	5	75

== Ward results ==
=== All Saints' ===
All Saints'
Party	Candidate	Votes	%	±%
Liberal	J. O'Loughlin	1,206	36.6	N/A
Conservative	E. Lewis	1,203	36.5	N/A
Labour	A. M. Thompson	823	25.0	−36.3
Independent	A. W. McKelvin	60	1.8	−36.9
Majority		3	0.1	
Turnout		3,292		
Liberal hold		Swing		

=== Ardwick ===
Ardwick
Party	Candidate	Votes	%	±%
Conservative	A. E. B. Alexander*	2,739	51.1	+7.4
Labour	J. M. Wharton	2,619	48.9	−7.4
Majority		120	2.2	
Turnout		5,358		
Conservative hold		Swing		

=== Beswick ===
Beswick
Party	Candidate	Votes	%	±%
Labour	W. Robinson*	4,334	52.4	+2.2
Conservative	J. H. Meachin	3,879	46.9	−2.9
NFDDSS	C. Reilly	57	0.7	N/A
Majority		455	5.5	+5.1
Turnout		8,270		
Labour hold		Swing		

=== Blackley ===
Blackley
Party	Candidate	Votes	%	±%
Liberal	T. S. Williams*	uncontested		
Liberal hold		Swing		

=== Bradford ===
Bradford
Party	Candidate	Votes	%	±%
Labour	E. J. Hart*	3,302	51.4	−5.5
Conservative	G. W. Leggott	3,125	48.6	+5.5
Majority		179	2.8	−11.0
Turnout		6,427		
Labour hold		Swing		

=== Cheetham ===
Cheetham
Party	Candidate	Votes	%	±%
Liberal	J. J. Kendall*	uncontested		
Liberal hold		Swing		

=== Chorlton-cum-Hardy ===
Chorlton-cum-Hardy
Party	Candidate	Votes	%	±%
Conservative	S. T. Rowe*	4,537	51.2	+4.3
Liberal	S. D. Simon	4,321	48.8	−4.3
Majority		216	2.4	
Turnout		8,858		
Conservative hold		Swing		

=== Collegiate Church ===
Collegiate Church
Party	Candidate	Votes	%	±%
Conservative	J. Hill*	976	52.7	+5.8
Liberal	P. I. Wigoder	876	47.3	+10.7
Majority		100	5.4	−4.8
Turnout		1,852		
Conservative hold		Swing		

=== Collyhurst ===
Collyhurst
Party	Candidate	Votes	%	±%
Conservative	E. Shields	2,764	54.7	+4.4
Labour	A. Park*	2,286	45.3	−4.4
Majority		478	9.4	+8.8
Turnout		5,050		
Conservative gain from Labour		Swing		

=== Crumpsall ===
Crumpsall
Party	Candidate	Votes	%	±%
Conservative	G. S. Grindley*	uncontested		
Conservative hold		Swing		

=== Didsbury ===
Didsbury
Party	Candidate	Votes	%	±%
Conservative	G. H. White*	2,104	59.8	N/A
Liberal	J. W. Hampson	1,416	40.2	N/A
Majority		688	19.6	N/A
Turnout		3,520		
Conservative hold		Swing		

=== Exchange ===
Exchange
Party	Candidate	Votes	%	±%
Conservative	A. S. Harper	560	58.6	N/A
Liberal	A. Nixon	395	41.4	N/A
Majority		165	17.2	N/A
Turnout		8,858		
Conservative gain from Liberal		Swing		

=== Gorton North ===
Gorton North
Party	Candidate	Votes	%	±%
Labour	W. Davy*	uncontested		
Labour hold		Swing		

=== Gorton South ===
Gorton South
Party	Candidate	Votes	%	±%
Labour	E. C. Wilkinson	3,341	57.2	+2.3
Conservative	J. E. Leicester	2,501	42.8	−2.3
Majority		841	14.4	+4.6
Turnout		5,842		
Labour hold		Swing		

=== Harpurhey ===
Harpurhey
Party	Candidate	Votes	%	±%
Conservative	T. Hoyle*	3,088	56.6	+7.5
Labour	A. E. Wolstenholme	2,369	43.4	−5.8
Majority		719	13.2	
Turnout		5,457		
Conservative hold		Swing		

=== Levenshulme ===
Levenshulme
Party	Candidate	Votes	%	±%
Independent	J. Harrison*	3,384	64.1	N/A
Labour	W. Davis	1,899	35.9	N/A
Majority		1,485	28.2	N/A
Turnout		5,457		
Independent hold		Swing		

=== Longsight ===
Longsight
Party	Candidate	Votes	%	±%
Conservative	W. P. Jackson	2,737	60.7	N/A
Co-operative Party	E. E. Beavan	1,772	39.3	N/A
Majority		965	21.4	N/A
Turnout		4,509		
Conservative hold		Swing		

=== Medlock Street ===
Medlock Street
Party	Candidate	Votes	%	±%
Conservative	W. J. Pine*	2,459	85.6	N/A
Independent	A. R. Edwards	415	14.4	N/A
Majority		2,044	71.2	N/A
Turnout		2,874		
Conservative hold		Swing		

=== Miles Platting ===
Miles Platting
Party	Candidate	Votes	%	±%
Labour	A. James*	3,383	57.1	+15.1
Conservative	T. McRoy	2,538	42.9	−4.0
Majority		845	14.2	
Turnout		5,921		
Labour hold		Swing		

=== Moss Side East ===
Moss Side East
Party	Candidate	Votes	%	±%
Liberal	R. E. T. Allen	1,821	46.5	N/A
Conservative	H. Dale	1,219	31.1	−10.1
Labour	G. H. Harris	877	22.4	N/A
Majority		602	15.4	
Turnout		3,917		
Liberal gain from Conservative		Swing		

=== Moss Side West ===
Moss Side West
Party	Candidate	Votes	%	±%
Liberal	J. Mathewson Watson*	uncontested		
Liberal hold		Swing		

=== Moston ===
Moston
Party	Candidate	Votes	%	±%
Labour	M. Welsh	2,292	44.6	−17.5
Conservative	J. Bostock*	1,980	38.5	N/A
Liberal	W. Turner	867	16.9	−21.0
Majority		312	6.1	−18.1
Turnout		5,139		
Labour gain from Conservative		Swing		

=== New Cross ===
New Cross
Party	Candidate	Votes	%	±%
Conservative	J. C. Grime*	3,372	58.3	−4.0
Labour	R. Matthews	2,407	41.7	+4.0
Majority		965	16.6	−8.0
Turnout		5,779		
Conservative hold		Swing		

=== Newton Heath ===
Newton Heath
Party	Candidate	Votes	%	±%
Labour	M. Jagger	2,555	56.9	+16.4
Conservative	W. Stephenson	1,932	43.1	−0.4
Majority		623	13.8	
Turnout		4,487		
Labour gain from Conservative		Swing		

=== Openshaw ===
Openshaw
Party	Candidate	Votes	%	±%
Labour	G. F. Titt*	2,894	57.8	+0.4
Conservative	A. H. Turner	2,111	42.2	−0.4
Majority		783	15.6	+0.8
Turnout		5,005		
Labour hold		Swing		

=== Oxford ===
Oxford
Party	Candidate	Votes	%	±%
Conservative	R. W. Shepherd*	uncontested		
Conservative hold		Swing		

=== Rusholme ===
Rusholme
Party	Candidate	Votes	%	±%
Liberal	C. H. Barlow*	1,852	42.0	−49.4
Conservative	S. J. Roberts	1,477	33.5	N/A
Labour	F. G. Lloyd	1,079	24.5	N/A
Majority		375	8.5	−73.7
Turnout		4,408		
Liberal hold		Swing		

=== St. Ann's ===
St. Ann's
Party	Candidate	Votes	%	±%
Conservative	R. A. Larmuth*	uncontested		
Conservative hold		Swing		

=== St. Clement's ===
St. Clement's
Party	Candidate	Votes	%	±%
Conservative	J. Goodwin	960	53.3	N/A
Liberal	W. H. Wood	842	46.7	N/A
Majority		118	6.6	N/A
Turnout		1,802		
Conservative gain from Liberal		Swing		

=== St. George's ===
St. George's
Party	Candidate	Votes	%	±%
Conservative	C. A. Toyn*	2,524	44.5	N/A
Labour	J. W. O'Neill	1,856	32.7	N/A
Liberal	A. Todd	1,289	22.8	N/A
Majority		668	11.8	N/A
Turnout		5,669		
Conservative hold		Swing		

=== St. John's ===
St. John's
Party	Candidate	Votes	%	±%
Conservative	I. Hinchliffe*	uncontested		
Conservative hold		Swing		

=== St. Luke's ===
St. Luke's
Party	Candidate	Votes	%	±%
Conservative	J. W. Higginbottom	2,260	52.4	−4.7
Liberal	C. Herford*	2,053	47.6	N/A
Majority		207	4.8	−22.6
Turnout		4,313		
Conservative gain from Liberal		Swing		

=== St. Mark's ===
St. Mark's
Party	Candidate	Votes	%	±%
Labour	C. Wood	3,309	58.0	+5.7
Conservative	W. Chapman*	2,399	42.0	−5.7
Majority		910	16.0	+11.4
Turnout		5,708		
Labour gain from Conservative		Swing		

=== St. Michael's ===
St. Michael's
Party	Candidate	Votes	%	±%
Labour	J. Reilly*	uncontested		
Labour hold		Swing		

=== Withington ===
Withington
Party	Candidate	Votes	%	±%
Liberal	W. A. Lewins*	1,904	55.3	N/A
Conservative	K. W. Chambers	1,540	44.7	+4.2
Majority		364	10.6	
Turnout		3,444		
Liberal hold		Swing		

== By-elections between 1923 and 1924 ==
=== St. Ann's, 19 February 1924 ===
Caused by the death of Councillor John George Litton (Conservative, St. Ann's, elected 1 November 1909) on 29 January 1924.

St. Ann's
Party	Candidate	Votes	%	±%
Conservative	E. Green	581	54.3	N/A
Independent	J. E. Balmer	489	45.7	N/A
Majority		92	8.6	N/A
Turnout		1,070	49.3	N/A
Conservative hold		Swing		
