= Mary Latchford Jones =

British Conservative politician

Mary Latchford Kingsmill Jones
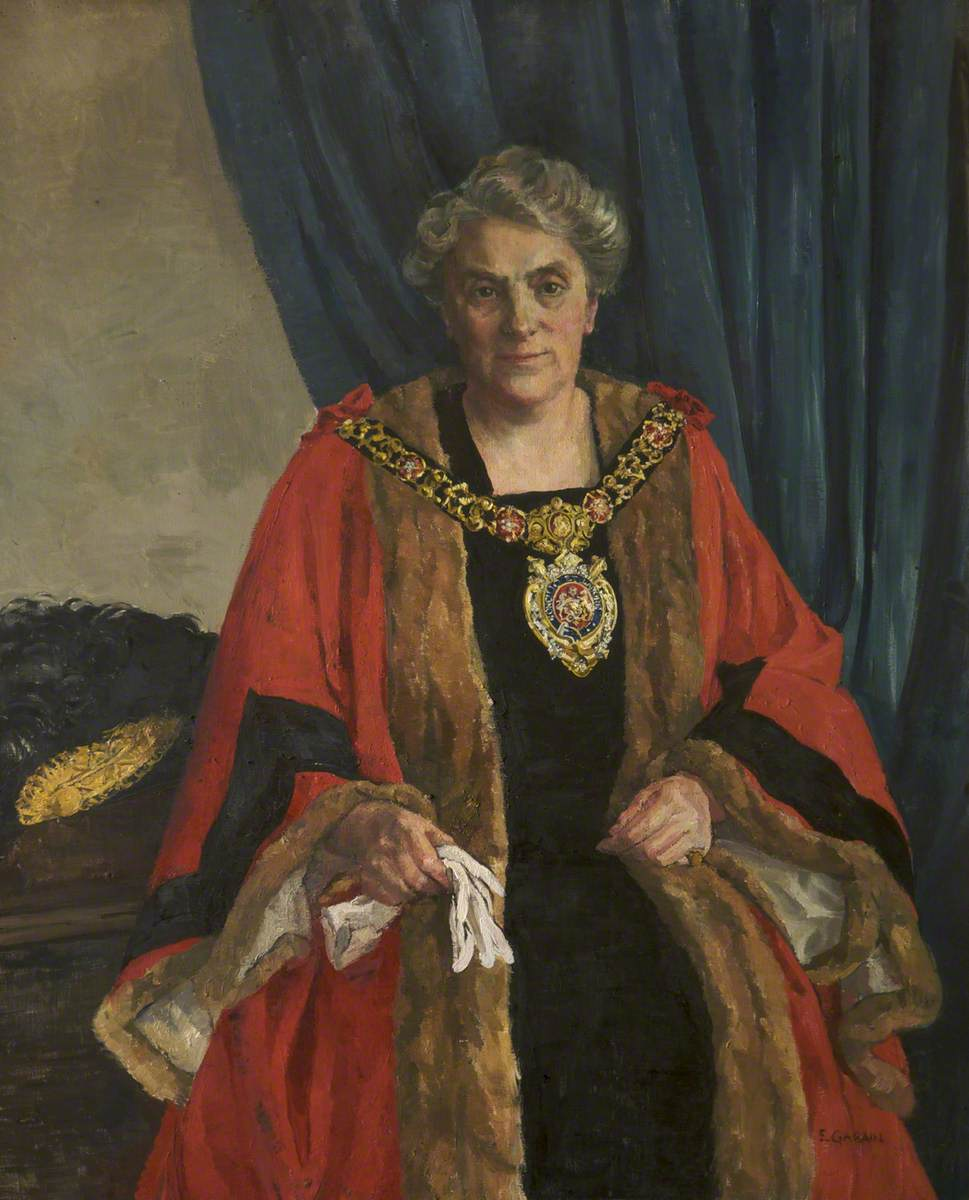
- by Ethel Léontine Gabain (1883–1950)
- Born: Mary Latchford Jones; 27 June 1877; Dublin, Ireland
- Died: 2 April 1968 (aged 90); Manchester, England
- Occupation: Politician
- Known for: 1st woman Lord Mayor of Manchester
- Political party: Conservative

Dame Mary Latchford Kingsmill Jones, DBE, JP (née Mary Latchford Jones; 27 June 1877 – 2 April 1968) was a British Conservative politician and the first woman Lord Mayor of Manchester.

== Life ==
Mary Latchford Jones was born on 28 June 1877 at 3 Wodehouse Terrace, North Circular Road, Dublin, the daughter of Percival Jones (1839–1906), a Dublin merchant and committed freemason, and Margaret Jones (née Williams; 1846–1920), originally from Mallow. She had a twin sister, Suzie Williams Jones (1877–1952), and two brothers, Percival Thomas Jones (1873–1894) and Kingsmill Williams Jones (1875–1918). She was educated at Alexandra College but did not go to university.

In 1914, she moved to Manchester to join her brother, a doctor in the city. In 1921, as Mary Latchford Kingsmill Jones, she was elected to Manchester City Council, representing the Conservative Party, having adopted her late brother (Kingsmill)'s name.

Jones served on council committees, and represented the council on external bodies. At both the 1924 and 1929 United Kingdom general elections, she stood in Manchester Ardwick, taking second place each time.

In 1938, Jones became an alderman, and the same year was made an Officer of the Order of the British Empire. From 1947 to 1949, she served as Lord Mayor of Manchester, the first woman to hold the post. During her term Manchester United won the FA Cup and she welcomed the winning team back to the city. She also conferred the freedom of the city on Winston Churchill.

At the end of her term, she was promoted to become a Commander of the Order of the British Empire (CBE). A painting paid for by fifty women's groups was commissioned. In 1958, she was promoted to Dame Commander of the Order of the British Empire (DBE). She retired from the council in 1966 and was made an honorary alderman the following year.

== Death ==
Dame Mary Latchford Kingsmill Jones died at her home in Manchester on 2 April 1968, aged 90.

== Honours ==
- Honorary Freeman of Manchester in 1956.
- Dame Commander of the Order of the British Empire (DBE) in 1958.

Civic offices
Preceded by Thomas Henry Adams	Lord Mayor of Manchester; 1947–1949	Succeeded by Robert Moss
