= St. Peter's (Manchester ward) =

- Ward
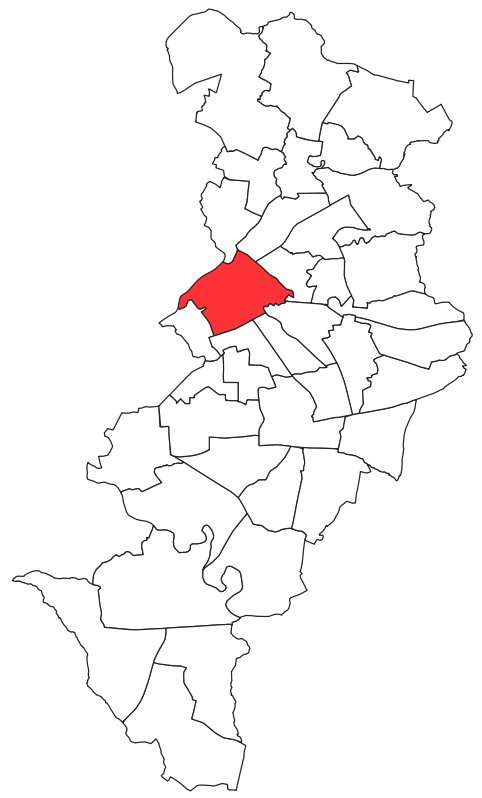
- St. Peter's ward (1954) within Manchester

- Coat of arms
- Country: United Kingdom
- Constituent country: England
- Region: North West England
- County borough: Manchester
- Created: May 1950
- Named for: St. Peter's

Government
  - Type: Unicameral
  - Body: Manchester City Council
- UK Parliamentary Constituency: Manchester Exchange

St. Peter's was an electoral division of Manchester City Council which was represented from 1950 until 1971. It covered Manchester city centre.

== Overview ==
St. Peter's ward was created in 1950, from the area of the former Exchange, Oxford, St. Ann's, St. Clement's, and St. John's wards. It included most of Manchester city centre as well as parts of Chorlton-on-Medlock and Hulme, transferred from the All Saints' ward and the former Medlock Street ward. In 1971, the ward was abolished, and its area was mostly transferred to the Collegiate Church ward, with a small portion becoming part of the new Hulme ward.

For the entirety of its existence, the ward formed part of the Manchester Exchange Parliamentary constituency.

== Councillors ==
Election	Councillor	Councillor	Councillor
1950	N. Beer (Con)	H. D. Parks (Con)	H. W. Bliss (Lab)
1951	N. Beer (Con)	H. D. Parks (Con)	H. W. Bliss (Lab)
1952	N. Beer (Con)	H. D. Parks (Con)	N. G. Westbrook (Con)
1953	N. Beer (Con)	H. D. Parks (Con)	N. G. Westbrook (Con)
1954	N. Beer (Con)	H. D. Parks (Con)	N. G. Westbrook (Con)
1955	N. Beer (Con)	H. D. Parks (Con)	N. G. Westbrook (Con)
1956	N. Beer (Con)	J. Carson (Con)	N. G. Westbrook (Con)
1957	N. Beer (Con)	J. Carson (Con)	N. G. Westbrook (Con)
1958	N. Beer (Con)	J. Carson (Con)	N. G. Westbrook (Con)
1959	N. Beer (Con)	J. Carson (Con)	N. G. Westbrook (Con)
1960	N. Beer (Con)	J. Carson (Con)	N. G. Westbrook (Con)
1961	N. Beer (Con)	J. Carson (Con)	N. G. Westbrook (Con)
1962	N. Beer (Con)	J. Carson (Con)	N. G. Westbrook (Con)
1963	N. Beer (Con)	J. Carson (Con)	N. G. Westbrook (Con)
1964	T. Baron (Con)	J. Carson (Con)	N. G. Westbrook (Con)
1965	T. Baron (Con)	J. Carson (Con)	N. G. Westbrook (Con)
1966	T. Baron (Con)	J. Carson (Con)	N. G. Westbrook (Con)
1967	T. Baron (Con)	J. Carson (Con)	A. L. Lowry (Con)
November 1967	T. Baron (Con)	J. Carson (Con)	J. Stuart-Mills (Con)
1968	J. Carson (Con)	R. J. Rubery (Con)	J. Stuart-Mills (Con)
1969	J. Carson (Con)	R. J. Rubery (Con)	J. Stuart-Mills (Con)
1970	J. Carson (Con)	R. J. Rubery (Con)	F. J. Balcombe (Labour)
September 1970	J. Jackson (Labour)	R. J. Rubery (Con)	F. J. Balcombe (Labour)

== Elections ==
=== Elections in 1950s ===
==== May 1950 ====
1950
Party	Candidate	Votes	%	±%
Conservative	H. D. Parks	2,082	69.7	
Labour	A. Harvey	907	30.3	
Majority		1,175	39.4	
Turnout		2,989		
Conservative hold		Swing		

==== May 1951 ====
1951
Party	Candidate	Votes	%	±%
Conservative	N. Beer*	2,114	84.0	+14.3
Labour	T. Lomas	403	16.0	−14.3
Majority		1,711	68.0	+28.6
Turnout		2,517		
Conservative hold		Swing		

==== May 1952 ====
1952
Party	Candidate	Votes	%	±%
Conservative	N. G. Westbrook*	1,987	63.5	−20.5
Labour	H. W. Bliss*	1,142	36.5	+20.5
Majority		845	27.0	−41.0
Turnout		3,129		
Conservative gain from Labour		Swing		

==== May 1953 ====
1953
Party	Candidate	Votes	%	±%
Conservative	H. D. Parks*	1,886	63.5	0
Labour	H. W. Bliss	1,083	36.5	0
Majority		803	27.0	0
Turnout		2,969		
Conservative hold		Swing		

==== May 1954 ====
1954
Party	Candidate	Votes	%	±%
Conservative	N. Beer*	1,909	69.8	+6.3
Labour	H. W. Bliss	825	30.2	−6.3
Majority		1,084	39.6	+12.6
Turnout		2,734		
Conservative hold		Swing		

==== May 1955 ====
1955
Party	Candidate	Votes	%	±%
Conservative	N. G. Westbrook*	1,823	75.2	+5.4
Labour	E. H. Jessop	602	24.8	−5.4
Majority		1,221	50.4	+10.8
Turnout		2,425		
Conservative hold		Swing		

==== May 1956 ====
1956
Party	Candidate	Votes	%	±%
Conservative	J. Carson	1,226	71.6	−3.6
Labour	C. E. Bedgood	486	28.4	+3.6
Majority		740	43.2	−7.2
Turnout		1,712		
Conservative hold		Swing		

==== May 1957 ====
1957
Party	Candidate	Votes	%	±%
Conservative	N. Beer*	1,344	71.5	−0.1
Labour	C. E. Bedgood	535	28.5	+0.1
Majority		809	43.0	−0.2
Turnout		1,879		
Conservative hold		Swing		

==== May 1958 ====
1958
Party	Candidate	Votes	%	±%
Conservative	N. G. Westbrook*	1,145	72.7	+1.2
Labour	V. Loran	429	27.3	−1.2
Majority		716	45.4	+2.4
Turnout		1,574		
Conservative hold		Swing		

==== May 1959 ====
1959
Party	Candidate	Votes	%	±%
Conservative	J. Carson*	1,170	67.2	−5.5
Labour	J. Maguire	571	32.8	+5.5
Majority		599	34.4	−11.0
Turnout		1,741		
Conservative hold		Swing		

=== Elections in 1960s ===
==== May 1960 ====
1960
Party	Candidate	Votes	%	±%
Conservative	N. Beer*	1,267	70.7	+3.5
Labour	P. Kelly	525	29.3	−3.5
Majority		742	41.4	+7.0
Turnout		1,792		
Conservative hold		Swing		

==== May 1961 ====
1961
Party	Candidate	Votes	%	±%
Conservative	N. G. Westbrook*	1,004	61.1	−9.6
Labour	J. Barnett	638	38.9	+9.6
Majority		366	22.2	−19.2
Turnout		1,642		
Conservative hold		Swing		

==== May 1962 ====
1962
Party	Candidate	Votes	%	±%
Conservative	J. Carson*	912	50.0	−11.1
Labour	J. Davis	582	31.9	−7.0
Union Movement	G. S. Gee	330	18.1	N/A
Majority		330	18.1	−4.1
Turnout		1,824		
Conservative hold		Swing		

==== May 1963 ====
1963
Party	Candidate	Votes	%	±%
Conservative	N. Beer*	1,026	74.6	+24.6
Labour	J. T. Morgan	350	25.4	−6.5
Majority		676	49.2	+31.1
Turnout		1,376		
Conservative hold		Swing		

==== May 1964 ====
1964 (2 vacancies)
Party	Candidate	Votes	%	±%
Conservative	N. G. Westbrook*	971	80.6	+6.0
Conservative	T. Baron	926	76.9	+2.3
Labour	T. Richardson	255	21.2	−4.2
Majority		671	55.7	+6.5
Turnout		1,204		
Conservative hold		Swing		
Conservative hold		Swing		

==== May 1965 ====
1965
Party	Candidate	Votes	%	±%
Conservative	J. Carson*	857	82.1	+1.6
Labour	T. Richardson	187	17.9	−3.3
Majority		670	64.2	+8.5
Turnout		1,044		
Conservative hold		Swing		

==== May 1966 ====
1966
Party	Candidate	Votes	%	±%
Conservative	T. Baron*	720	71.0	−11.1
Labour	P. T. Taylor	294	29.0	+11.1
Majority		426	42.0	−22.2
Turnout		1,014		
Conservative hold		Swing		

==== May 1967 ====
1967
Party	Candidate	Votes	%	±%
Conservative	A. L. Lowry	841	64.7	−6.3
Labour	C. B. Muir	353	27.2	−1.8
Liberal	A. T. Parkinson	105	8.1	N/A
Majority		488	37.5	−4.5
Turnout		1,299		
Conservative hold		Swing		

==== November 1967 (by-election) ====
By-election: 16 November 1967
Party	Candidate	Votes	%	±%
Conservative	J. Stuart-Mills	669	64.1	−0.6
Labour	C. B. Muir	375	35.9	+8.7
Majority		294	28.2	−9.3
Turnout		1,044		
Conservative hold		Swing		

==== May 1968 ====
1968 (2 vacancies)
Party	Candidate	Votes	%	±%
Conservative	R. J. Rubery	810	69.7	+5.0
Conservative	J. Carson*	792	68.2	+3.5
Labour	C. B. Muir	264	22.7	−4.5
Labour	A. S. Goldstone	228	19.6	−7.6
Liberal	J. E. Hargreaves	88	7.8	−0.3
Majority		528	45.5	+8.0
Turnout		1,162		
Conservative hold		Swing		
Conservative hold		Swing		

==== May 1969 ====
1969
Party	Candidate	Votes	%	±%
Conservative	J. Carson*	718	78.0	+8.3
Labour	B. S. Jeuda	202	22.0	−0.7
Majority		516	56.0	+10.5
Turnout		920		
Conservative hold		Swing		

=== Elections in 1970s ===
==== May 1970 ====
1970
Party	Candidate	Votes	%	±%
Labour	F. J. Balcombe*	608	62.7	+40.7
Conservative	J. R. Cawley	305	31.5	−46.5
Liberal	I. Garrard	51	5.3	N/A
Residents	L. Robertson	5	0.5	N/A
Majority		303	31.2	
Turnout		969		
Labour gain from Conservative		Swing		

==== September 1970 (by-election) ====
By-election: 24 September 1970
Party	Candidate	Votes	%	±%
Labour	J. Jackson	399	73.5	+10.8
Conservative	J. R. Cawley	106	19.5	−12.0
Liberal	S. Lowe	38	7.0	+1.7
Majority		293	54.0	+22.8
Turnout		543		
Labour gain from Conservative		Swing		

== See also ==
- Manchester City Council
- Manchester City Council elections
