= Crumpsall (ward) =

- Ward
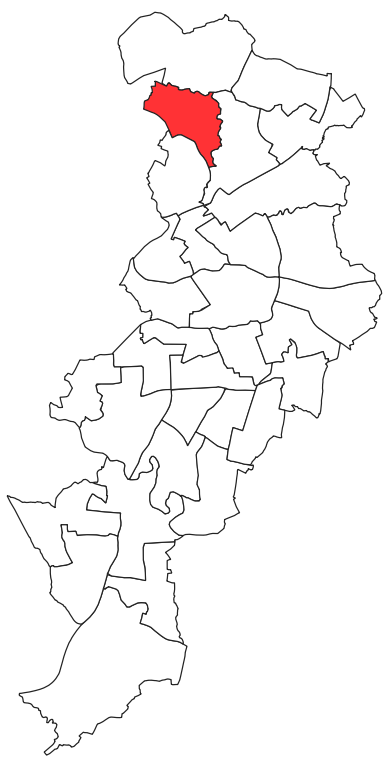
- Crumpsall ward (2018) within Manchester

- Coat of arms
- Country: United Kingdom
- Constituent country: England
- Region: North West England
- County: Greater Manchester
- Metropolitan borough: Manchester
- Created: November 1890
- Named for: Crumpsall

Government
  - Type: Unicameral
  - Body: Manchester City Council
- UK Parliamentary Constituency: Blackley and Middleton South

Crumpsall is an electoral division of Manchester City Council which has been represented since 1890. It covers the North Manchester suburb of Crumpsall.

== Overview ==
Crumpsall ward was created in 1890, as a result of the Manchester Extension Scheme 1890, which transferred the townships of Blackley, Crumpsall, Moston, Newton, Openshaw, and parts of Gorton to the Manchester corporation. Initially, it covered the whole of the former Crumpsall township. When Heaton Park was incorporated into the city in 1903, its area became part of the ward. In 1919, an area of the former Blackley and Moston ward to the north of Victoria Avenue was transferred to the ward. City-wide boundary revisions in 1950 transferred the Boothroydon area to the Blackley ward, before further revisions in 1971 transferred Heaton Park to the Blackley ward. Heaton Park returned to Crumpsall in 1982, but was transferred to the new Higher Blackley ward in 2004. At the latest revision in 2018, the ward's northern and eastern boundary was standardised along the River Irk.

From its creation until 1918, the ward formed part of the Prestwich Parliamentary constituency. From 1918 until 2010, it was part of the Manchester Blackley Parliamentary constituency. From 2010 until 2024, it was part of the Blackley and Broughton Parliamentary constituency. Since 2024, it has formed part of the Blackley and Middleton South Parliamentary constituency.

== Councillors ==
Election	Councillor	Councillor	Councillor
1890	W. Butterworth (Lib)	G. Rhodes (Lib)	E. Holt (Con)
1891	W. Butterworth (Lib)	G. Rhodes (Lib)	E. Holt (Con)
1892	W. Butterworth (Lib)	F. Heywood (Con)	E. Holt (Con)
1893	W. Butterworth (Lib)	F. Heywood (Con)	E. Holt (Con)
1894	W. Butterworth (Lib)	F. Heywood (Con)	E. Holt (Con)
1895	W. Butterworth (Lib)	W. F. Dearden (Con)	E. Holt (Con)
1896	W. Bradley (Lib)	W. F. Dearden (Con)	E. Holt (Con)
1897	W. Bradley (Lib)	W. F. Dearden (Con)	E. Holt (Con)
1898	W. Bradley (Lib)	W. F. Dearden (Con)	E. Holt (Con)
1899	W. Bradley (Lib)	W. F. Dearden (Con)	E. Holt (Con)
1900	W. Bradley (Lib)	W. F. Dearden (Con)	E. Holt (Con)
1901	W. Bradley (Lib)	W. F. Dearden (Con)	E. Holt (Con)
1902	H. H. Humphreys (Con)	W. F. Dearden (Con)	E. Holt (Con)
1903	H. H. Humphreys (Con)	W. F. Dearden (Con)	E. Holt (Con)
1904	H. H. Humphreys (Con)	W. F. Dearden (Con)	E. Holt (Con)
July 1905	H. H. Humphreys (Con)	W. F. Dearden (Con)	F. Todd (Con)
1905	G. H. Rawsthorn (Lib)	W. F. Dearden (Con)	F. Todd (Con)
May 1906	G. H. Rawsthorn (Lib)	G. F. H. Gibson (Con)	F. Todd (Con)
1906	G. H. Rawsthorn (Lib)	G. F. H. Gibson(Con)	F. Todd (Con)
May 1907	F. J. Robertshaw (Con)	G. F. H. Gibson (Con)	F. Todd (Con)
1907	F. J. Robertshaw (Con)	G. F. H. Gibson (Con)	F. Todd (Con)
1908	F. J. Robertshaw (Con)	G. F. H. Gibson (Con)	F. Todd (Con)
1909	F. J. Robertshaw (Con)	G. F. H. Gibson (Con)	F. Todd (Con)
April 1910	F. J. Robertshaw (Con)	I. Platt (Ind)	F. Todd (Con)
1910	F. J. Robertshaw (Con)	H. Wood (Con)	F. Todd (Con)
1911	F. J. Robertshaw (Con)	H. Wood (Con)	F. Todd (Con)
1912	F. J. Robertshaw (Con)	H. Wood (Con)	F. Todd (Con)
1913	F. J. Robertshaw (Con)	H. Wood (Con)	F. Todd (Con)
1914	F. J. Robertshaw (Con)	H. Wood (Con)	F. Todd (Con)
1919	F. J. Robertshaw (Con)	H. Wood (Con)	F. Todd (Con)
1920	F. J. Robertshaw (Con)	G. S. Grindley (Con)	F. Todd (Con)
1921	F. J. Robertshaw (Con)	G. S. Grindley (Con)	F. Todd (Con)
1922	F. J. Robertshaw (Con)	G. S. Grindley (Con)	F. Todd (Con)
December 1922	F. J. Robertshaw (Con)	G. S. Grindley (Con)	W. Dennison (Con)
1923	F. J. Robertshaw (Con)	G. S. Grindley (Con)	W. Dennison (Con)
1924	F. J. Robertshaw (Con)	G. S. Grindley (Con)	W. Dennison (Con)
February 1925	J. Sever (Con)	G. S. Grindley (Con)	W. Dennison (Con)
1925	J. Sever (Con)	G. S. Grindley (Con)	W. Dennison (Con)
1926	J. Sever (Con)	G. S. Grindley (Con)	W. Dennison (Con)
1927	J. Sever (Con)	G. S. Grindley (Con)	W. Dennison (Con)
1928	J. Sever (Con)	G. S. Grindley (Con)	J. E. W. Booth (Lib)
1929	J. Sever (Con)	S. Meadowcroft (Lib)	J. E. W. Booth (Lib)
1930	G. S. Grindley (Con)	S. Meadowcroft (Lib)	J. E. W. Booth (Lib)
1931	G. S. Grindley (Con)	S. Meadowcroft (Lib)	W. Reid (Con)
1932	G. S. Grindley (Con)	S. Meadowcroft (Lib)	W. Reid (Con)
September 1933	G. S. Grindley (Con)	S. Meadowcroft (Lib)	F. Weaver (Con)
1933	G. S. Grindley (Con)	S. Meadowcroft (Lib)	F. Weaver (Con)
1934	G. S. Grindley (Con)	S. Meadowcroft (Lib)	F. Weaver (Con)
1935	G. S. Grindley (Con)	S. Meadowcroft (Lib)	F. Weaver (Con)
1936	G. S. Grindley (Con)	S. Meadowcroft (Lib)	F. Weaver (Con)
January 1937	G. C. Roberts (Con)	S. Meadowcroft (Lib)	F. Weaver (Con)
1937	G. C. Roberts (Con)	S. Meadowcroft (Lib)	F. Weaver (Con)
1938	G. C. Roberts (Con)	S. Meadowcroft (Lib)	F. Weaver (Con)
1945	J. P. Jennings (Lab)	G. C. Roberts (Con)	F. Weaver (Con)
1946	J. P. Jennings (Lab)	G. C. Roberts (Con)	H. Lomax (Con)
1947	J. P. Jennings (Lab)	G. C. Roberts (Con)	H. Lomax (Con)
1949	N. H. McDowall (Con)	G. C. Roberts (Con)	H. Lomax (Con)
1950	N. H. McDowall (Con)	G. C. Roberts (Con)	H. Lomax (Con)
August 1950	S. Tomlinson (Con)	G. C. Roberts (Con)	R. Collier (Con)
1951	S. Tomlinson (Con)	A. A. Clapham (Con)	R. Collier (Con)
1952	S. Tomlinson (Con)	A. A. Clapham (Con)	R. Collier (Con)
1953	S. Tomlinson (Con)	A. A. Clapham (Con)	R. Collier (Con)
1954	S. Tomlinson (Con)	E. Mawdsley (Con)	R. Collier (Con)
1955	S. Tomlinson (Con)	E. Mawdsley (Con)	R. Collier (Con)
1956	S. Tomlinson (Con)	E. Mawdsley (Con)	R. Collier (Con)
1957	S. Tomlinson (Con)	E. Mawdsley (Con)	R. Collier (Con)
1958	F. J. Balcombe (Lab)	E. Mawdsley (Con)	R. Collier (Con)
1959	F. J. Balcombe (Lab)	E. Mawdsley (Con)	R. Collier (Con)
1960	F. J. Balcombe (Lab)	E. Mawdsley (Con)	R. Collier (Con)
1961	F. J. Balcombe (Lab))	E. Mawdsley (Con)	R. Collier (Con)
1962	F. J. Balcombe (Lab)	E. Mawdsley (Con)	F. R. Butler (Con)
1963	F. J. Balcombe (Lab)	A. Zolkwer (Lab)	F. R. Butler (Con)
1964	F. J. Balcombe (Lab)	A. Zolkwer (Lab)	F. R. Butler (Con)
1965	F. J. Balcombe (Lab)	A. Zolkwer (Lab)	F. R. Butler (Con)
1966	F. J. Balcombe (Lab)	B. H. Taylor (Con)	F. R. Butler (Con)
1967	J. Yates (Con)	B. H. Taylor (Con)	F. R. Butler (Con)
1968	J. Yates (Con)	B. H. Taylor (Con)	F. R. Butler (Con)
1969	J. Yates (Con)	B. H. Taylor (Con)	F. R. Butler (Con)
1970	A. S. Daulby (Con)	B. H. Taylor (Con)	F. R. Butler (Con)
1971	J. V. Marshall (Lab)	P. A. Sless (Lab)	H. Brooks (Lab)
1972	J. V. Marshall (Lab)	P. A. Sless (Lab)	F. R. Butler (Con)
1973	G. Fildes (Con)	A. A. Clapham (Con)	F. W. Lever (Con)
1975	G. Fildes (Con)	A. A. Clapham (Con)	F. W. Lever (Con)
1976	G. Fildes (Con)	W. L. Clapham (Con)	F. W. Lever (Con)
1978	G. Fildes (Con)	W. L. Clapham (Con)	F. W. Lever (Con)
1979	G. Fildes (Con)	W. L. Clapham (Con)	F. W. Lever (Con)
1980	G. Fildes (Con)	N. W. Harrison (Lab)	F. W. Lever (Con)
1982	F. R. Butler (Con)	F. W. Lever (Con)	G. Fildes (Con)
1983	F. R. Butler (Con)	F. W. Lever (Con)	B. Curley (Lab)
1984	F. R. Butler (Con)	R. Leese (Lab)	B. Curley (Lab)
1986	M. Hackett (Lab)	R. Leese (Lab)	B. Curley (Lab)
1987	M. Hackett (Lab)	R. Leese (Lab)	R. Bullock (Con)
1988	M. Hackett (Lab)	R. Leese (Lab)	R. Bullock (Con)
1990	A. Spinks (Lab)	R. Leese (Lab))	R. Bullock (Con)
1991	A. Spinks (Lab)	R. Leese (Lab)	V. Edwards (Lab)
1992	A. Spinks (Lab)	R. Leese (Lab)	V. Edwards (Lab)
1994	A. Spinks (Lab)	R. Leese (Lab)	V. Edwards (Lab)
1995	A. Spinks (Lab)	R. Leese (Lab)	V. Edwards (Lab)
1996	A. Spinks (Lab)	R. Leese (Lab)	V. Edwards (Lab)
1998	A. Spinks (Lab)	R. Leese (Lab)	V. Edwards (Lab)
1999	A. Spinks (Lab)	R. Leese (Lab)	T. Lister (Lab)
2000	A. Spinks (Lab)	R. Leese (Lab)	T. Lister (Lab)
2002	A. Spinks (Lab)	R. Leese (Lab)	T. Lister (Lab)
2003	A. Spinks (Lab)	R. Leese (Lab)	C. Keegan (Lab)
2004	Richard Leese (Lab)	Con Keegan (Lab)	Jon-Leigh Pritchard (Lab)
2006	Richard Leese (Lab)	Con Keegan (Lab)	Jon-Leigh Pritchard (Lab)
2007	Richard Leese (Lab)	Con Keegan (Lab)	Jon-Leigh Pritchard (Lab)
2008	Richard Leese (Lab)	Con Keegan (Lab)	Jon-Leigh Pritchard (Lab)
2010	Richard Leese (Lab)	Con Keegan (Lab)	Jon-Leigh Pritchard (Lab)
2011	Richard Leese (Lab)	Con Keegan (Lab)	Jon-Leigh Pritchard (Lab)
2012	Richard Leese (Lab)	Con Keegan (Lab)	Jon-Leigh Pritchard (Lab)
2014	Richard Leese (Lab)	Con Keegan (Lab)	Jon-Leigh Pritchard (Lab)
2015	Richard Leese (Lab)	Beth Marshall (Lab)	Jon-Leigh Pritchard (Lab)
2016	Richard Leese (Lab)	Beth Marshall (Lab)	Jon-Leigh Pritchard (Lab)
2018	Richard Leese (Lab)	Nasrin Ali (Lab)	Fiaz Riasat (Lab)
2019	Richard Leese (Lab)	Nasrin Ali (Lab)	Fiaz Riasat (Lab)
2021	Richard Leese (Lab)	Nasrin Ali (Lab)	Fiaz Riasat (Lab)
2022	Jawad Amin (Lab)	Nasrin Ali (Lab)	Fiaz Riasat (Lab)
2023	Jawad Amin (Lab)	Nasrin Ali (Lab)	Fiaz Riasat (Lab)
2024	Jawad Amin (Lab)	Nasrin Ali (Lab)	Fiaz Riasat (Lab)
2026	Jawad Amin (Lab)	Nasrin Ali (Lab)	Fiaz Riasat (Lab)

== Elections ==
=== Elections in 2020s ===
==== May 2026 ====
2026
Party	Candidate	Votes	%	±%
Labour	Jawad Amin*	1,425	41.3	−31.6
Green	Robert Pollitt	1,073	31.1	+26.0
Reform	Iftikhar Ahmed	587	17.0	N/A
Workers Party	Mini Majid	246	7.1	N/A
Liberal Democrats	Amaan Hashmi	123	3.6	−1.0
Majority		352	10.2	−50.3
Turnout		3,454	28.4	−0.1
Labour hold		Swing		

==== May 2024 ====
2024
Party	Candidate	Votes	%	±%
Labour	Nasrin Ali*	1,467	42.6	23.8 ▼
Independent	Madasar Kasana Anwar	981	28.5	New
Green	Alison Jane Hawdale	298	8.6	0.3 ▲
Conservative	Arbab Khan Fatima	213	6.2	15.4 ▼
Liberal Democrats	Norman Lewis	192	5.6	1.9 ▲
Independent	Tariq Baz	124	3.6	New
Women's Equality	Samantha Days	123	3.6	New
Majority		486	14.3	
Rejected ballots		50	1.5	
Turnout		3,448	28.77	
Registered electors		11,983		
Labour hold		Swing	26.1 ▼	

==== May 2023 ====
2023
Party	Candidate	Votes	%	±%
Labour	Fiaz Riasat*	2,220	74.4	2.8 ▲
Conservative	Fatima Khan	316	10.6	1.8 ▲
Green	Alison Hawdale	170	5.7	−0.7 ▼
Liberal Democrats	Richard Clayton	163	5.5	1.2 ▲
Women's Equality	Samantha Days	96	3.2	0.8 ▲
Majority		1,904	63.8	0.9 ▲
Rejected ballots		18	0.6	-0.1 ▼
Turnout		2,983	25.6	−4.4 ▼
Registered electors		11,665		
Labour hold		Swing	0.5 ▲	

==== May 2022 ====
2022
Party	Candidate	Votes	%	±%
Labour	Mohammad Jawad Amin	2,387	72.9	1.0 ▼
Conservative	Iftikhar Butt Ahmed	497	15.2	4.6 ▲
Green	Alison Hawdale	167	5.1	2.8 ▼
Liberal Democrats	Mike McKinstry	152	4.6	0.9 ▼
Women's Equality	Sam Days	57	1.7	n/a
Majority		1,890	57.7	
Rejected ballots		13		
Turnout		3,260	28.5	5.5 ▼
Registered electors		11,493		
Labour hold		Swing	2.8 ▼	

==== May 2021 ====
2021
Party	Candidate	Votes	%	±%
Labour	Nasrin Ali*	2,341	66.4	14.6 ▼
Conservative	Iftikhar Ahmed Butt	762	21.6	11.8 ▲
Green	Alison Hawdale	291	8.3	3.5 ▲
Liberal Democrats	Michael McKinstry	130	3.7	1.6 ▲
Majority		1,579	44.8	
Rejected ballots		39	1.1	
Turnout		3,563	30.0	4.0 ▼
Registered electors		11,583		
Labour hold		Swing	13.2 ▼	

=== Elections in 2010s ===
==== May 2019 ====
2019
Party	Candidate	Votes	%	±%
Labour	Fiaz Riazat*	2,402	71.6	▲4.8
Conservative	Sham Akhtar	294	8.8	▼1.8
Green	Adam King	214	6.4	▼1.5
UKIP	Ernest Willescroft	159	4.7	▲0.8
Liberal Democrats	Andrew McGuinness	143	4.3	▼1.2
Women's Equality	Samantha Days	82	2.4	n/a
For Britain	Brian Sallis	38	1.1	n/a
Majority		2,108	62.9	▲6.7
Rejected ballots		22	0.66	
Turnout		3,354	29.96	▼4.0
Registered electors		11,203		
Labour hold		Swing	▲3.3	

==== May 2018 ====
2018 (3 vacancies; new boundaries)
Party	Candidate	Votes	%	±%
Labour	Richard Leese*	2,783	73.9	
Labour	Nasrin Ali	2,644	70.2	
Labour	Fiaz Riasat	2,517	66.8	
Conservative	Sham Akhtar	399	10.6	
Conservative	Mohammad Malik	303	8.0	
Green	Penny Swann	298	7.9	
Conservative	Shun Wah Tang	263	7.0	
Liberal Democrats	Sarah Brown	206	5.5	
UKIP	Mark Davies	148	3.9	
Independent	Peter Rowe	138	3.7	
TUSC	Grace Donaghey	104	2.8	
Majority				
Turnout		3,768	34	
Labour win (new boundaries)				
Labour win (new boundaries)				
Labour win (new boundaries)				

==== May 2016 ====
2016
Party	Candidate	Votes	%	±%
Labour	Richard Leese*	2,704	74.4	−4.2
UKIP	Bob Willescroft	375	10.3	+3.3
Conservative	Sarah Idowu Ajiboye	288	7.9	+0.8
Green	Penny Miller-Swann	151	4.2	−0.7
Liberal Democrats	Iain Colin Donaldson	75	2.1	−0.3
TUSC	Martin Conway	44	1.2	n/a
Majority		2,329	64.0	
Turnout		3,637	32.79	
Labour hold		Swing		

==== May 2015 ====
2015
Party	Candidate	Votes	%	±%
Labour	Beth Marshall	3,899	65.2	−11.9
UKIP	Bob Willescroft	789	13.2	N/A
Conservative	Sham Raja Akhtar	694	11.6	−2.4
Green	Thomas John Stokes	316	5.3	+1.3
Liberal Democrats	Joel Moorcroft	151	2.5	−2.5
TUSC	Martin Conway	128	2.2	N/A
Majority		3,110	52.0	
Turnout		5,977	52.7	+18.3
Labour hold		Swing		

==== May 2014 ====
2014
Party	Candidate	Votes	%	±%
Labour	Jon-Leigh Pritchard*	2,524	66.70	+8.80
UKIP	Bob Willescroft	588	15.54	+8.34
Conservative	Sham Raja Akhtar	392	10.36	−6.44
Green	Anne Vivienne Power	208	5.50	N/A
Liberal Democrats	Charles William Turner	72	1.90	−10.30
Majority		1,936	51.2	
Turnout		3,784	32.82	
Labour hold		Swing		

==== May 2012 ====
2012
Party	Candidate	Votes	%	±%
Labour	Richard Leese*	2,499	78.6	+22.1
Conservative	Samuel Jacob	225	7.1	−11.9
UKIP	Robert Willescroft	221	7.0	+0.4
Green	Kim Alwyn	157	4.9	−1.7
Liberal Democrats	Adam Hewitt	77	2.4	−8.9
Majority		2,274	72	
Turnout		3,179	29.2	
Labour hold		Swing		

==== May 2011 ====
2011
Party	Candidate	Votes	%	±%
Labour	Con Keegan*	2,754	77.1	+17.0
Conservative	Sham Akhtar	500	14.0	−4.5
Liberal Democrats	Ben Fearn	177	5.0	−8.1
Green	Pratichi Chatterjee	142	4.0	−4.3
Majority		2,254	63.1	
Turnout		3,573	33.4	
Labour hold		Swing		

==== May 2010 ====
2010
Party	Candidate	Votes	%	±%
Labour	Jon-Leigh Pritchard*	3,179	57.9	+1.4
Conservative	Shamin Raja Akhtar	924	16.8	−2.2
Liberal Democrats	Mo Saqib	669	12.2	+0.9
UKIP	Rob Willescroft	394	7.2	+0.6
Respect	Madaser Anwar	321	7.2	+7.2
Majority		2,255	41.1	+3.6
Turnout		5,487	52.3	+22.3
Labour hold		Swing	+1.8	

=== Elections in 2000s ===
==== May 2008 ====
2008
Party	Candidate	Votes	%	±%
Labour	Richard Leese*	1,773	56.5	−3.6
Conservative	Kim Glasspole	597	19.0	+0.5
Liberal Democrats	Rashid Shahbaz	354	11.3	−1.8
Green	Eithne Quinn	208	6.6	−1.7
UKIP	Bob Willescroft	206	6.6	+6.6
Majority		1,176	37.5	−4.1
Turnout		3,138	30.0	+0.1
Labour hold		Swing	-2.0	

==== May 2007 ====
2007
Party	Candidate	Votes	%	±%
Labour	Con Keegan*	1,832	60.1	+10.5
Conservative	Adrian Glasspole	564	18.5	+4.3
Liberal Democrats	Muhammad Shahbaz	398	13.1	−8.8
Green	John Cummings	254	8.3	+1.7
Majority		1,268	41.6	+14.0
Turnout		3,048	29.9	−3.9
Labour hold		Swing	+3.1	

==== May 2006 ====
2006
Party	Candidate	Votes	%	±%
Labour	Jon-Leigh Pritchard*	1,667	49.6	+4.6
Liberal Democrats	Sham Raja	738	21.9	+2.2
Conservative	Adrian Paul Glasspole	476	14.2	−4.3
UKIP	Ernest Robert Willescroft	259	7.7	+7.7
Green	Justine Michelle Hall	223	6.6	−10.1
Majority		929	27.6	+2.4
Turnout		3,363	33.8	−8.0
Labour hold		Swing	+1.2	

==== June 2004 ====
2004 (3 vacancies; new boundaries)
Party	Candidate	Votes	%	±%
Labour	Richard Leese*	1,862	51.2	
Labour	Con Keegan*	1,717	47.2	
Labour	Jon-Leigh Pritchard	1,388	38.2	
Liberal Democrats	Sham Akhtar	816	22.4	
Conservative	Rodney Keller	767	21.1	
Liberal Democrats	Stephen Allen	757	20.8	
Green	Barbara Lewis	692	19.0	
Liberal Democrats	Andrew Weston	537	14.8	
Conservative	Garvan Walshe	487	13.4	
Majority		572	15.8	
Turnout		3,635	36.7	
Labour win (new seat)				
Labour win (new seat)				
Labour win (new seat)				

==== May 2003 ====
2003
Party	Candidate	Votes	%	±%
Labour	Cornelius Keegan	1,323	57.0	−4.6
Liberal Democrats	David Gordon	477	20.6	+5.9
Conservative	Garvan Walshe	350	15.1	+0.4
Green	Joseph Richardson	158	6.8	+2.5
Socialist Alliance	Karen Reissmann	12	0.5	−1.9
Majority		846	36.5	−10.4
Turnout		2,320	25.1	−3.2
Labour hold		Swing	-5.2	

==== May 2002 ====
2002
Party	Candidate	Votes	%	±%
Labour	Alan Spinks*	1,644	61.6	−4.8
Conservative	Adrian Hutchinson	393	14.7	−5.7
Liberal Democrats	Andrew Steele	392	14.7	+5.1
Green	Angela Hall	115	4.3	+0.7
Socialist Alliance	Karen Reissmann	63	2.4	+2.4
Socialist Labour	Mervyn Drage	60	2.2	+2.2
Majority		1,251	46.9	+0.9
Turnout		2,667	28.3	+3.7
Labour hold		Swing	+0.4	

==== May 2000 ====
2000
Party	Candidate	Votes	%	±%
Labour	Richard Leese	1,447	66.4	−2.4
Conservative	Jacqueline Rowland	444	20.4	+3.8
Liberal Democrats	Andrew Steele	210	9.6	−1.6
Green	Julian Parry	78	3.6	+0.1
Majority		1,003	46.0	−6.2
Turnout		2,179	24.6	+0.9
Labour hold		Swing	-3.1	

=== Elections in 1990s ===
==== May 1999 ====
1999
Party	Candidate	Votes	%	±%
Labour	Thomas Lister	1,525	68.8	+0.7
Conservative	Jacqueline Rowland	367	16.6	−1.0
Liberal Democrats	David Gordon	248	11.2	−3.1
Green	Christopher Middleton	77	3.5	+3.5
Majority		1,158	52.2	+1.8
Turnout		2,217	23.7	
Labour hold		Swing	+0.8	

==== May 1998 ====
1998
Party	Candidate	Votes	%	±%
Labour	Alan Spinks*	1,462	68.1	−6.1
Conservative	Nigel Dugmore	379	17.6	+2.2
Liberal Democrats	David Gordon	307	14.3	+6.5
Majority		1,083	50.4	−8.4
Turnout		2,148		
Labour hold		Swing	-4.1	

==== May 1996 ====
1996
Party	Candidate	Votes	%	±%
Labour	Richard Leese*	1,913	74.2	−0.4
Conservative	Teresa Skorsewski	398	15.4	+1.4
Liberal Democrats	J. Spurway	201	7.8	−1.1
Residents	J. Riemer	65	2.5	+2.5
Majority		1,515	58.8	−1.8
Turnout		2,577		
Labour hold		Swing	-0.9	

==== May 1995 ====
1995
Party	Candidate	Votes	%	±%
Labour	Val Edwards*	2,079	74.6	+9.9
Conservative	Gregory Skorsewski	389	14.0	−5.8
Liberal Democrats	J. Spurway	248	8.9	−6.5
Independent	Melanie Jarman	71	2.5	+2.5
Majority		1,690	60.6	+15.7
Turnout		2,787		
Labour hold		Swing	+7.8	

==== May 1994 ====
1994
Party	Candidate	Votes	%	±%
Labour	A. Spinks*	2,062	64.7	+12.7
Conservative	G. Mellyng	631	19.8	−20.6
Liberal Democrats	P. Matthews	492	15.4	+7.8
Majority		1,431	44.9	+33.3
Turnout		3,185		
Labour hold		Swing	+16.6	

==== May 1992 ====
1992
Party	Candidate	Votes	%	±%
Labour	R. Leese*	1,575	52.0	+5.8
Conservative	P. Wells	1,224	40.4	+2.2
Liberal Democrats	D. Gordon	231	7.6	−3.0
Majority		351	11.6	+3.6
Turnout		3,030		
Labour hold		Swing	+1.8	

==== May 1991 ====
1991
Party	Candidate	Votes	%	±%
Labour	V. Edwards	1,782	46.2	−4.7
Conservative	A. E. Walsh	1,474	38.2	+2.1
Liberal Democrats	D. I. Gordon	408	10.6	+4.7
Green	P. R. Lewis	190	4.9	−2.1
Majority		308	8.0	−6.8
Turnout		3,854	41.7	
Labour gain from Conservative		Swing	-3.4	

==== May 1990 ====
1990
Party	Candidate	Votes	%	±%
Labour	A. Spinks	2,151	50.9	+3.3
Conservative	A. E. Walsh	1,526	36.1	−9.8
Green	P. R. Lewis	295	7.0	+7.0
Liberal Democrats	D. I. Gordon	250	5.9	−0.6
Majority		625	14.8	+13.1
Turnout		4,222		
Labour hold		Swing	+6.5	

=== Elections in 1980s ===
==== May 1988 ====
1988
Party	Candidate	Votes	%	±%
Labour	R. Leese*	2,014	47.6	+11.1
Conservative	A. E. Walsh	1,942	45.9	+0.8
SLD	J. A. Smith	276	6.5	−9.6
Majority		72	1.7	−6.9
Turnout		4,232		
Labour hold		Swing	+5.1	

==== May 1987 ====
1987
Party	Candidate	Votes	%	±%
Conservative	Roger Bullock	2,178	45.1	+14.1
Labour	Basil Curley*	1,764	36.5	−13.2
SDP	Harry Blease	776	16.1	−3.2
Independent	Robert Lomas	113	2.3	+2.3
Majority		414	8.6	−10.0
Turnout		4,831		
Conservative gain from Labour		Swing	+13.6	

==== May 1986 ====
1986
Party	Candidate	Votes	%	±%
Labour	M. Hackett	1,997	49.7	+0.3
Conservative	G. Fildes	1,248	31.0	−7.8
SDP	H. Showman	775	19.3	+7.5
Majority		749	18.6	+8.0
Turnout		4,020		
Labour gain from Conservative		Swing	+4.0	

==== May 1984 ====
1984
Party	Candidate	Votes	%	±%
Labour	Richard Leese	2,090	49.4	+5.1
Conservative	Frederick Lever*	1,640	38.8	−4.3
Liberal	H. Showman	501	11.8	−0.9
Majority		450	10.6	+9.4
Turnout		4,231		
Labour gain from Conservative		Swing	+4.7	

==== May 1983 ====
1983
Party	Candidate	Votes	%	±%
Labour	Basil Curley	1,887	44.3	+11.9
Conservative	George Fildes*	1,836	43.1	−0.9
SDP	Gerald Landsman	541	12.7	−11.0
Majority		51	1.2	−10.4
Turnout		4,264		
Labour gain from Conservative		Swing	+6.4	

==== May 1982 ====
1982 (3 vacancies; new boundaries)
Party	Candidate	Votes	%	±%
Conservative	Frederick Butler	1,822	42.6	
Conservative	Frederick Lever*	1,634	38.2	
Conservative	George Fildes*	1,577	36.8	
Labour	Basil Curley	1,341	31.3	
Labour	Richard Jones	1,333	31.1	
Labour	Kenneth Barnes	1,332	31.1	
SDP	Gerald Landsman	980	22.9	
SDP	Brian Gibbons	944	22.0	
SDP	Teresa Lyons	857	20.0	
Majority		236	5.5	
Turnout		4,282	45.2	
Conservative win (new seat)				
Conservative win (new seat)				
Conservative win (new seat)				

==== May 1980 ====
1980
Party	Candidate	Votes	%	±%
Labour	N. W. Harrison	2,230	50.8	+8.1
Conservative	W. L. Clapham*	1,919	43.7	−3.3
Liberal	K. Osbourne	238	5.4	−5.0
Majority		311	7.1	+2.8
Turnout		4,387	38.8	−32.7
Labour gain from Conservative		Swing	+5.7	

=== Elections in 1970s ===
==== May 1979 ====
1979
Party	Candidate	Votes	%	±%
Conservative	F. W. Lever*	3,615	47.0	−6.9
Labour	M. Harrison	3,287	42.7	+5.2
Liberal	J. Cookson	797	10.4	+3.3
Majority		328	4.3	−12.2
Turnout		7,699	71.5	+36.2
Conservative hold		Swing	-6.0	

==== May 1978 ====
1978
Party	Candidate	Votes	%	±%
Conservative	G. Fildes*	2,183	53.9	−3.6
Labour	G. Stringer	1,517	37.5	+4.0
Liberal	J. Cookson	286	7.1	−1.9
Communist	S. Ward	61	1.5	+1.5
Majority		666	16.5	−7.5
Turnout		4,047	35.3	
Conservative hold		Swing	-3.8	

==== May 1976 ====
1976
Party	Candidate	Votes	%	±%
Conservative	W. L. Clapham	2,528	57.5	−2.8
Labour	P. A. Murphy	1,474	33.5	+5.1
Liberal	A. E. Griffiths	396	9.0	−2.3
Majority		1,054	24.0	−7.9
Turnout		4,398		
Conservative hold		Swing	-3.9	

==== May 1975 ====
1975
Party	Candidate	Votes	%	±%
Conservative	F. W. Lever*	2,236	60.3	−3.2
Labour	S. Caron	1,054	28.4	−8.0
Liberal	A. E. Griffiths	418	11.3	+11.3
Majority		1,182	31.9	+4.9
Turnout		3,708		
Conservative hold		Swing	+2.4	

==== May 1973 ====
1973 (3 vacancies; reorganisation)
Party	Candidate	Votes	%	±%
Conservative	G. Fildes	2,027	61.6	+2.2
Conservative	A. Clapham	2,026	61.6	+2.2
Conservative	F. W. Lever	2,022	61.4	+2.0
Labour	A. T. Gray	1,165	35.4	−5.3
Labour	H. Gregory	1,105	33.6	−7.0
Labour	P. A. Sless*	1,082	32.9	−7.7
Majority		857	26.0	+7.2
Turnout		3,291		
Conservative hold		Swing		
Conservative gain from Labour		Swing		
Conservative gain from Labour		Swing		

==== May 1972 ====
1972
Party	Candidate	Votes	%	±%
Conservative	F. R. Butler	2,451	59.4	+13.6
Labour	H. Brooks*	1,676	40.6	−10.4
Majority		775	18.8	
Turnout		4,127		
Conservative gain from Labour		Swing		

==== May 1971 ====
1971 (3 vacancies; new boundaries)
Party	Candidate	Votes	%	±%
Labour	J. V. Marshall	2,795	51.0	
Labour	P. A. Sless	2,789	50.9	
Labour	H. Brooks	2,649	48.4	
Conservative	F. R. Butler*	2,511	45.8	
Conservative	A. S. Daulby	2,444	44.6	
Conservative	B. H. Taylor*	2,307	42.1	
Liberal	H. Wiseberg	741	13.5	
Communist	J. A. Day	195	3.6	
Majority		138	2.5	
Turnout		5,477		
Labour win (new seat)				
Labour win (new seat)				
Labour win (new seat)				

==== May 1970 ====
1970
Party	Candidate	Votes	%	±%
Conservative	A. S. Daulby	3,223	52.7	−14.9
Labour	J. E. Jackson	2,833	46.4	+14.0
Residents	B. Campbell	56	0.9	N/A
Majority		390	6.3	−28.9
Turnout		6,112		
Conservative hold		Swing		

=== Elections in 1960s ===
==== May 1969 ====
1969
Party	Candidate	Votes	%	±%
Conservative	B. H. Taylor*	3,409	67.6	+7.6
Labour	W. Egerton	1,632	32.4	−7.6
Majority		1,777	35.2	+15.2
Turnout		5,041		
Conservative hold		Swing		

==== May 1968 ====
1968
Party	Candidate	Votes	%	±%
Conservative	F. R. Butler*	3,794	60.0	+4.5
Labour	F. J Balcombe	2,528	40.0	−5.5
Majority		1,266	20.0	+11.0
Turnout		6,322		
Conservative hold		Swing		

==== May 1967 ====
1967
Party	Candidate	Votes	%	±%
Conservative	J. Yates	3,480	54.5	+2.0
Labour	F. J. Balcombe*	2,900	45.5	−2.0
Majority		580	9.0	+4.0
Turnout		6,380		
Conservative gain from Labour		Swing		

==== May 1966 ====
1966
Party	Candidate	Votes	%	±%
Conservative	B. H. Taylor	2,682	52.5	+3.5
Labour	A. Zolkwer*	2,423	47.5	+12.8
Majority		259	5.0	−9.3
Turnout		5,105		
Conservative gain from Labour		Swing		

==== May 1965 ====
1965
Party	Candidate	Votes	%	±%
Conservative	F. R. Butler*	3,269	49.0	+13.7
Labour	N. Scholes	2,312	34.7	−12.8
Liberal	A. F. Sullivan	1,086	16.3	−0.9
Majority		957	14.3	
Turnout		6,667		
Conservative hold		Swing		

==== May 1964 ====
1964
Party	Candidate	Votes	%	±%
Labour	F. J. Balcombe*	3,590	47.5	+6.6
Conservative	E. Taylor	2,669	35.3	+0.9
Liberal	A. F. Sullivan	1,292	17.2	−7.5
Majority		921	12.2	+5.7
Turnout		7,551		
Labour hold		Swing		

==== May 1963 ====
1963
Party	Candidate	Votes	%	±%
Labour	A. Zolkwer	3,312	40.9	+5.7
Conservative	E. Mawdsley*	2,780	34.4	−1.4
Liberal	A. F. Sullivan	2,000	24.7	−4.3
Majority		532	6.5	
Turnout		8,092		
Labour gain from Conservative		Swing		

==== May 1962 ====
1962
Party	Candidate	Votes	%	±%
Conservative	F. R. Butler	2,947	35.8	−3.9
Labour	A. Zolkwer	2,904	35.2	−12.0
Liberal	A. F. Sullivan	2,389	29.0	+15.9
Majority		43	0.6	
Turnout		8,240		
Conservative hold		Swing		

==== May 1961 ====
1961
Party	Candidate	Votes	%	±%
Labour	F. J. Balcombe*	3,874	47.2	+18.3
Conservative	F. R. Butler	3,262	39.7	−12.1
Liberal	A. F. Sullivan	1,078	13.1	−6.2
Majority		611	7.5	
Turnout		8,213		
Labour hold		Swing		

==== May 1960 ====
1960
Party	Candidate	Votes	%	±%
Conservative	E. Mawdsley*	3,307	51.8	+6.3
Labour	S. N. M. Moxley	1,843	28.9	−7.9
Liberal	H. Gilbert	1,231	19.3	+1.6
Majority		1,464	22.9	+14.2
Turnout		6,381		
Conservative hold		Swing		

=== Elections in 1950s ===
==== May 1959 ====
1959
Party	Candidate	Votes	%	±%
Conservative	R. Collier*	3,709	45.5	−0.5
Labour	S. N. M. Moxley*	2,998	36.8	−17.2
Liberal	I. Savage	1,440	17.7	N/A
Majority		711	8.7	
Turnout		8,147		
Conservative hold		Swing		

==== May 1958 ====
1958
Party	Candidate	Votes	%	±%
Labour	F. J. Balcombe	4,055	54.0	+7.2
Conservative	S. Tomlinson*	3,458	46.0	−7.2
Majority		597	8.0	
Turnout		7,513		
Labour gain from Conservative		Swing		

==== May 1957 ====
1957
Party	Candidate	Votes	%	±%
Conservative	E. Mawdsley*	3,162	53.2	−3.5
Labour	K. Franklin	2,785	46.8	+3.5
Majority		377	6.4	−7.0
Turnout		5,947		
Conservative hold		Swing		

==== May 1956 ====
1956
Party	Candidate	Votes	%	±%
Conservative	R. Collier*	3,172	56.7	−3.5
Labour	K. Franklin	2,420	43.3	+3.5
Majority		752	13.4	−7.0
Turnout		5,592		
Conservative hold		Swing		

==== May 1955 ====
1955
Party	Candidate	Votes	%	±%
Conservative	S. Tomlinson*	4,270	60.2	+7.1
Labour	M. Tylecote	2,822	39.8	−7.1
Majority		1,448	20.4	+14.2
Turnout		7,092		
Conservative hold		Swing		

==== May 1954 ====
1954
Party	Candidate	Votes	%	±%
Conservative	E. Mawdsley*	3,782	53.1	−5.4
Labour	J. P. Jennings	3,336	46.9	+5.4
Majority		446	6.2	−10.8
Turnout		7,118		
Conservative hold		Swing		

==== May 1953 ====
1953
Party	Candidate	Votes	%	±%
Conservative	R. Collier*	4,189	58.5	+4.1
Labour	E. Mellor	2,972	41.5	−4.1
Majority		1,217	17.0	+8.2
Turnout		7,161		
Conservative hold		Swing		

==== May 1952 ====
1952
Party	Candidate	Votes	%	±%
Conservative	W. Tomlinson*	4,248	54.4	−11.3
Labour	D. Mellor	3,555	45.6	+11.3
Majority		693	8.8	−22.6
Turnout		7,803		
Conservative hold		Swing		

==== May 1951 ====
1951
Party	Candidate	Votes	%	±%
Conservative	A. A. Clapham*	4,699	65.7	+3.3
Labour	A. O'Toole	2,452	34.3	−1.3
Majority		2,247	31.4	+4.6
Turnout		7,151		
Conservative hold		Swing		

==== August 1950 (by-election) ====
By-election: 31 August 1950 (2 vacancies)
Party	Candidate	Votes	%	±%
Conservative	R. Collier	4,056	63.0	+0.6
Conservative	S. Tomlinson	3,986	61.9	−0.5
Labour	W. Lewis	2,465	38.3	+2.7
Labour	J. B. Ogden	2,375	36.9	+1.3
Majority		1,521	23.6	−3.2
Turnout		6,441		
Conservative hold		Swing		
Conservative hold		Swing		

==== May 1950 ====
1950 (new boundaries)
Party	Candidate	Votes	%	±%
Conservative	H. Lomax	4,400	62.4	
Labour	J. B. Ogden	2,510	35.6	
Communist	K. Edwards	145	2.0	
Majority		1,890	26.8	
Turnout		7,055		
Conservative hold		Swing		

=== Elections in 1940s ===
==== May 1949 ====
1949
Party	Candidate	Votes	%	±%
Conservative	N. H. McDowall	4,682	46.4	−9.0
Labour	J. P. Jennings*	3,801	37.7	+11.1
Liberal	F. Merryweather	1,609	15.9	+1.0
Majority		881	8.7	−20.1
Turnout		10,092		
Conservative gain from Labour		Swing		

==== November 1947 ====
1947
Party	Candidate	Votes	%	±%
Conservative	A. Clapham	5,805	55.4	+9.2
Labour	C. Lynch	2,794	26.6	−7.4
Liberal	R. F. Read	1,566	14.9	−1.0
Communist	S. Waring	321	3.1	−0.8
Majority		3,011	28.8	+16.7
Turnout		10,486		
Conservative hold		Swing		

==== November 1946 ====
1946
Party	Candidate	Votes	%	±%
Conservative	H. Lomax*	3,760	46.2	+8.0
Labour	H. Broderick	2,763	34.0	−4.9
Liberal	R. F. Read	1,293	15.9	−7.0
Communist	S. Waring	313	3.9	N/A
Majority		997	12.1	+12.1
Turnout		8,129		
Conservative hold		Swing		

==== November 1945 ====
1945 (2 vacancies)
Party	Candidate	Votes	%	±%
Labour	J. P. Jennings	3,091	38.9	+7.9
Conservative	G. C. Roberts*	3,032	38.2	N/A
Conservative	R. Renshaw	3,021	38.0	N/A
Labour	H. Broderick	2,986	37.6	+6.6
Liberal	C. Hughes*	1,824	22.9	−46.1
Majority		11	0.1	
Turnout		7,947	43.0	
Labour gain from Liberal		Swing		
Conservative hold		Swing		

=== Elections in 1930s ===
==== November 1938 ====
1938
Party	Candidate	Votes	%	±%
Liberal	S. Meadowcroft*	2,969	69.0	N/A
Labour	R. B. Prain	1,336	31.0	−2.0
Majority		1,633	38.0	
Turnout		4,305		
Liberal hold		Swing		

==== November 1937 ====
1937
Party	Candidate	Votes	%	±%
Conservative	F. Weaver*	2,200	63.3	+0.3
Labour	R. B. Prain	1,148	33.0	+1.1
Independent	W. Dennison	130	3.7	−1.4
Majority		1,052	30.3	−0.8
Turnout		3,478		
Conservative hold		Swing		

==== January 1937 (by-election) ====
By-election: 28 January 1937
Party	Candidate	Votes	%	±%
Conservative	C. Roberts	1,168	47.2	−15.8
Liberal	B. G. Bottomley	889	35.9	N/A
Labour	J. Pevie	416	16.8	−15.1
Majority		279	11.3	−19.8
Turnout		2,473		
Conservative hold		Swing		

==== November 1936 ====
1936
Party	Candidate	Votes	%	±%
Conservative	G. S. Grindley*	2,398	63.0	+29.5
Labour	C. W. Carpenter	1,216	31.9	+14.4
Independent	W. Dennison	194	5.1	N/A
Majority		1,182	31.1	
Turnout		3,808		
Conservative hold		Swing		

==== November 1935 ====
1935
Party	Candidate	Votes	%	±%
Liberal	S. Meadowcroft*	2,250	49.0	N/A
Conservative	H. C. Turner	1,542	33.5	−36.2
Labour	J. Pevie	805	17.5	−12.8
Majority		708	15.5	
Turnout		4,597		
Liberal hold		Swing		

==== November 1934 ====
1934
Party	Candidate	Votes	%	±%
Conservative	F. Weaver*	1,789	69.7	+23.6
Labour	C. W. Jones	776	30.3	+11.8
Majority		1,013	39.4	+28.3
Turnout		2,565		
Conservative hold		Swing		

==== November 1933 ====
1933
Party	Candidate	Votes	%	±%
Conservative	G. S. Grindley*	1,693	46.1	N/A
Liberal	Lord Stanley of Alderley	1,286	35.0	N/A
Labour	A. Sutcliffe	680	18.5	N/A
Residents	D. Wighton	16	0.4	N/A
Majority		407	11.1	N/A
Turnout		3,675		
Conservative hold		Swing		

==== September 1933 (by-election) ====
By-election: 19 September 1933
Party	Candidate	Votes	%	±%
Conservative	F. Weaver	1,438	70.5	N/A
Labour	A. Sutcliffe	601	29.5	N/A
Majority		837	41.0	N/A
Turnout		2,039		
Conservative hold		Swing		

==== November 1932 ====
1932
Party	Candidate	Votes	%	±%
Liberal	S. Meadowcroft*	uncontested		
Liberal hold		Swing		

==== November 1931 ====
1931
Party	Candidate	Votes	%	±%
Conservative	W. Reid	2,187	51.2	0
Liberal	G. H. Harrison	2,082	48.8	+3.9
Majority		105	2.4	−3.9
Turnout		4,269	54.6	
Conservative gain from Liberal		Swing		

==== November 1930 ====
1930
Party	Candidate	Votes	%	±%
Conservative	G. S. Grindley	1,913	51.2	+15.9
Liberal	F. L. Chaplin	1,674	44.9	+3.4
Independent	W. Dennison	145	3.9	−0.4
Majority		239	6.3	
Turnout		3,732		
Conservative hold		Swing		

=== Elections in 1920s ===
==== November 1929 ====
1929
Party	Candidate	Votes	%	±%
Liberal	S. Meadowcroft	1,449	41.5	−18.2
Conservative	G. S. Grindley*	1,234	35.3	−5.0
Labour	C. E. P. Stott	660	18.9	N/A
Independent	W. Dennison	149	4.3	N/A
Majority		215	6.2	−13.2
Turnout		3,492	50.1	−7.3
Liberal gain from Conservative		Swing		

==== November 1928 ====
1928
Party	Candidate	Votes	%	±%
Liberal	J. E. W. Booth	2,207	59.7	N/A
Conservative	W. Dennison*	1,488	40.3	N/A
Majority		719	19.4	N/A
Turnout		3,695	57.4	N/A
Liberal gain from Conservative		Swing		

==== November 1927 ====
1927
Party	Candidate	Votes	%	±%
Conservative	J. Sever*	uncontested		
Conservative hold		Swing		

==== November 1926 ====
1926
Party	Candidate	Votes	%	±%
Conservative	G. S. Grindley*	uncontested		
Conservative hold		Swing		

==== November 1925 ====
1925
Party	Candidate	Votes	%	±%
Conservative	W. Dennison*	2,278	71.1	N/A
Labour	F. C. Mason	925	28.9	N/A
Majority		1,353	42.2	N/A
Turnout		3,203	57.4	N/A
Conservative hold		Swing		

==== February 1925 (by-election) ====
By-election: 10 February 1925
Party	Candidate	Votes	%	±%
Conservative	J. Sever	uncontested		
Conservative hold		Swing		

==== November 1924 ====
1924
Party	Candidate	Votes	%	±%
Conservative	F. J. Robertshaw*	uncontested		
Conservative hold		Swing		

==== November 1923 ====
1923
Party	Candidate	Votes	%	±%
Conservative	G. S. Grindley*	uncontested		
Conservative hold		Swing		

==== December 1922 (by-election) ====
By-election: 2 December 1922
Party	Candidate	Votes	%	±%
Conservative	W. Dennison	1,224	43.1	N/A
Liberal	E. H. Wagon	1,043	36.7	N/A
Labour	C. Stott	572	20.2	N/A
Majority		181	6.4	N/A
Turnout		2,839		
Conservative hold		Swing		

==== November 1922 ====
1922
Party	Candidate	Votes	%	±%
Conservative	F. Todd*	uncontested		
Conservative hold		Swing		

==== November 1921 ====
1921
Party	Candidate	Votes	%	±%
Conservative	F. J. Robertshaw*	1,594	56.7	+15.8
Liberal	H. Wagon	1,215	43.3	+7.1
Majority		379	13.4	+8.7
Turnout		2,809	58.2	−5.6
Conservative hold		Swing		

==== November 1920 ====
1920
Party	Candidate	Votes	%	±%
Conservative	G. S. Grindley	1,324	40.9	N/A
Liberal	M. Goodwin	1,173	36.2	N/A
Labour	C. Stott	741	22.9	N/A
Majority		151	4.7	N/A
Turnout		3,238	58.2	N/A
Conservative hold		Swing		

=== Elections in 1910s ===
==== November 1919 ====
1919 (new boundaries)
Party	Candidate	Votes	%	±%
Conservative	F. Todd*	uncontested		
Conservative hold		Swing		

==== November 1914 ====
1914
Party	Candidate	Votes	%	±%
Conservative	F. J. Robertshaw*	uncontested		
Conservative hold		Swing		

==== November 1913 ====
1913
Party	Candidate	Votes	%	±%
Conservative	H. Wood*	uncontested		
Conservative hold		Swing		

==== November 1912 ====
1912
Party	Candidate	Votes	%	±%
Conservative	F. Todd*	uncontested		
Conservative hold		Swing		

==== November 1911 ====
1911
Party	Candidate	Votes	%	±%
Conservative	F. J. Robertshaw*	719	62.6	+8.8
Labour	P. L. Martin	429	37.4	N/A
Majority		290	25.2	+17.6
Turnout		1,148		
Conservative hold		Swing		

==== November 1910 ====
1910
Party	Candidate	Votes	%	±%
Conservative	H. Wood	788	53.8	−16.2
Independent	I. Platt*	676	46.2	N/A
Majority		112	7.6	−32.4
Turnout		1,464		
Conservative gain from Independent		Swing		

==== April 1910 (by-election) ====
By-election: 12 April 1910
Party	Candidate	Votes	%	±%
Independent	I. Platt	587	51.4	N/A
Conservative	H. Johns	554	48.6	−21.4
Majority		33	2.8	
Turnout		1,141		
Independent gain from Conservative		Swing		

=== Elections in 1900s ===
==== November 1909 ====
1909
Party	Candidate	Votes	%	±%
Conservative	F. Todd*	908	70.0	N/A
Labour	J. A. McGee	390	30.0	N/A
Majority		518	40.0	N/A
Turnout		1,298		
Conservative hold		Swing		

==== November 1908 ====
1908
Party	Candidate	Votes	%	±%
Conservative	F. J. Robertshaw*	uncontested		
Conservative hold		Swing		

==== November 1907 ====
1907
Party	Candidate	Votes	%	±%
Conservative	G. F. H. Gibson*	uncontested		
Conservative hold		Swing		

==== May 1907 (by-election) ====
By-election: 14 May 1907
Party	Candidate	Votes	%	±%
Conservative	F. J. Robertshaw	654	60.4	N/A
Liberal	J. Weedall	428	39.6	N/A
Majority		226	20.8	N/A
Turnout		1,082		
Conservative gain from Liberal		Swing		

==== November 1906 ====
1906
Party	Candidate	Votes	%	±%
Conservative	F. Todd*	uncontested		
Conservative hold		Swing		

==== May 1906 (by-election) ====
By-election: 7 May 1906
Party	Candidate	Votes	%	±%
Conservative	G. F. H. Gibson	uncontested		
Conservative hold		Swing		

==== November 1905 ====
1905
Party	Candidate	Votes	%	±%
Liberal	G. H. Rawsthorn	765	59.2	N/A
Conservative	J. Hislop	527	40.8	N/A
Majority		238	18.4	N/A
Turnout		1,292		
Liberal gain from Conservative		Swing		

==== July 1905 (by-election) ====
By-election: 21 July 1905
Party	Candidate	Votes	%	±%
Conservative	F. Todd	uncontested		
Conservative hold		Swing		

==== November 1904 ====
1904
Party	Candidate	Votes	%	±%
Conservative	W. F. Dearden*	uncontested		
Conservative hold		Swing		

==== November 1903 ====
1903
Party	Candidate	Votes	%	±%
Conservative	E. Holt*	uncontested		
Conservative hold		Swing		

==== November 1902 ====
1902
Party	Candidate	Votes	%	±%
Conservative	H. H. Humphreys	720	55.4	N/A
Liberal	J. J. Kendall	502	38.6	N/A
Labour	A. Ogden	78	6.0	N/A
Majority		218	16.8	N/A
Turnout		1,300		
Conservative gain from Liberal		Swing		

==== November 1901 ====
1901
Party	Candidate	Votes	%	±%
Conservative	W. F. Dearden*	uncontested		
Conservative hold		Swing		

==== November 1900 ====
1900
Party	Candidate	Votes	%	±%
Conservative	E. Holt*	uncontested		
Conservative hold		Swing		

=== Elections in 1890s ===
==== November 1899 ====
1899
Party	Candidate	Votes	%	±%
Liberal	W. Bradley*	uncontested		
Liberal hold		Swing		

==== November 1898 ====
1898
Party	Candidate	Votes	%	±%
Conservative	W. F. Dearden*	uncontested		
Conservative hold		Swing		

==== November 1897 ====
1897
Party	Candidate	Votes	%	±%
Conservative	E. Holt*	uncontested		
Conservative hold		Swing		

==== November 1896 ====
1896
Party	Candidate	Votes	%	±%
Liberal	W. Bradley*	uncontested		
Liberal hold		Swing		

==== November 1895 ====
1895
Party	Candidate	Votes	%	±%
Conservative	W. F. Dearden	uncontested		
Conservative hold		Swing		

==== November 1894 ====
1894
Party	Candidate	Votes	%	±%
Conservative	E. Holt*	uncontested		
Conservative hold		Swing		

==== November 1893 ====
1893
Party	Candidate	Votes	%	±%
Liberal	W. Butterworth*	620	62.9	+22.1
Conservative	W. F. Dearden	366	37.1	−22.1
Majority		254	25.8	
Turnout		986		
Liberal hold		Swing		

==== November 1892 ====
1892
Party	Candidate	Votes	%	±%
Conservative	F. Heywood	548	59.2	N/A
Liberal	G. Rhodes*	378	40.8	N/A
Majority		170	18.4	N/A
Turnout		926		
Conservative gain from Liberal		Swing		

==== November 1891 ====
1891
Party	Candidate	Votes	%	±%
Conservative	E. Holt*	uncontested		
Conservative hold		Swing		

==== November 1890 ====
1890 (3 vacancies)
Party	Candidate	Votes	%	±%
Liberal	W. Butterworth	uncontested		
Liberal	G. Rhodes	uncontested		
Conservative	E. Holt	uncontested		
Liberal win (new seat)				
Liberal win (new seat)				
Conservative win (new seat)				

== See also ==
- Manchester City Council
- Manchester City Council elections
