= 1951 Manchester City Council election =

Local election in Manchester, England

- 10 May 1951

36 of 144 seats to Manchester City Council 73 seats needed for a majority
	First party	Second party	Third party
Party	Conservative	Labour	Liberal
Last election	18 seats, 50.5%	19 seats, 47.4%	0 seats, 1.3%
Seats before	78	60	6
Seats won	22	14	0
Seats after	77	61	6
Seat change	▼1	▲1	Steady
Popular vote	118,754	86,558	3,324
Percentage	56.7%	41.3%	1.6%
Swing	▲6.2%	▼6.1%	▲0.3%
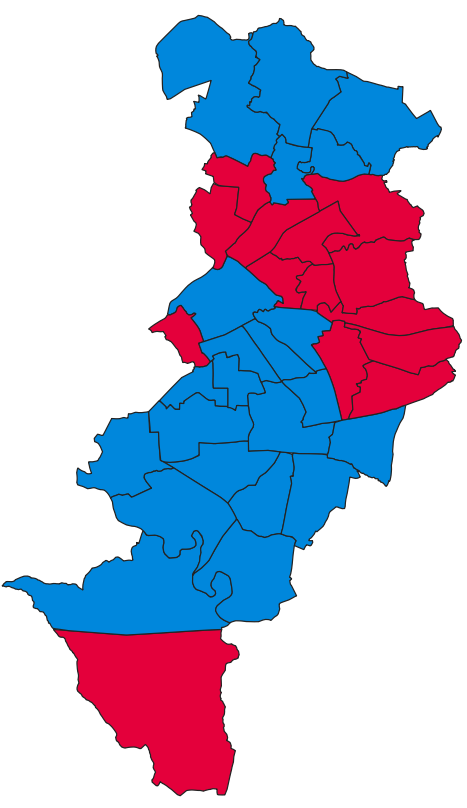
- Map of results of 1951 election
Leader of the Council before election
Conservative
Leader of the Council after election
Conservative

Elections to Manchester City Council were held on Thursday, 10 May 1951. One third of the councillors seats were up for election, with each successful candidate to serve a three-year term of office. The Conservative Party retained overall control of the council.

== Election result ==
Party	Votes		Seats			Full Council	
Conservative Party	118,754 (56.7%)	▲6.2	22 (61.1%)	22 / 36	▼1	77 (53.5%)	77 / 144
Labour Party	86,558 (41.3%)	▼6.1	14 (38.9%)	14 / 36	▲1	61 (42.4%)	61 / 144
Liberal Party	3,324 (1.6%)	▲0.3	0 (0.0%)	0 / 36	Steady	6 (4.2%)	6 / 144
Communist	692 (0.3%)	▼0.4	0 (0.0%)	0 / 36	Steady	0 (0.0%)	0 / 144
Independent	113 (0.1%)	N/A	0 (0.0%)	0 / 36	N/A	0 (0.0%)	0 / 144

=== Full council ===
↓
61	6	77

=== Aldermen ===
↓
13	6	18

=== Councillors ===
↓
48	59

== Ward results ==
=== Alexandra Park ===
Alexandra Park
Party	Candidate	Votes	%	±%
Conservative	A. Lees*	4,530	79.6	+3.8
Labour	J. H. Paris	1,159	20.4	−3.8
Majority		3,371	59.2	+7.6
Turnout		5,689		
Conservative hold		Swing		

=== All Saints' ===
All Saints'
Party	Candidate	Votes	%	±%
Conservative	C. A. Earley	2,620	57.4	+5.7
Labour	F. P. Evans	1,944	42.6	−3.9
Majority		676	14.8	+9.6
Turnout		4,564		
Conservative hold		Swing		

=== Ardwick ===
Ardwick
Party	Candidate	Votes	%	±%
Conservative	P. Buckley*	3,697	58.0	+12.3
Labour	P. Roddy	2,674	42.0	−12.3
Majority		1,023	16.0	
Turnout		6,371		
Conservative hold		Swing		

=== Barlow Moor ===
Barlow Moor
Party	Candidate	Votes	%	±%
Conservative	H. Harker*	2,735	70.8	+17.8
Labour	B. J. Overall	1,129	29.2	+1.6
Majority		1,606	41.6	+16.2
Turnout		3,864		
Conservative hold		Swing		

=== Beswick ===
Beswick
Party	Candidate	Votes	%	±%
Labour	T. W. Farrell*	3,460	63.8	−9.6
Conservative	C. P. R. Dunn	1,966	36.2	+11.4
Majority		1,494	27.6	−21.0
Turnout		5,426		
Labour hold		Swing		

=== Blackley ===
Blackley
Party	Candidate	Votes	%	±%
Conservative	P. Chadwick*	4,804	65.0	+8.0
Labour	H. Britton	2,587	35.0	−8.0
Majority		2,217	30.0	+16.0
Turnout		7,391		
Conservative hold		Swing		

=== Bradford ===
Bradford
Party	Candidate	Votes	%	±%
Labour	E. E. Beavan*	3,744	57.1	−6.9
Conservative	E. Rooney	2,808	42.9	+6.9
Majority		936	14.2	−13.8
Turnout		6,552		
Labour hold		Swing		

=== Burnage ===
Burnage
Party	Candidate	Votes	%	±%
Conservative	D. J. Edwards	4,860	65.9	+6.3
Labour	J. Barlow	2,517	34.1	−6.3
Majority		2,343	31.8	+12.6
Turnout		7,377		
Conservative hold		Swing		

=== Cheetham ===
Cheetham
Party	Candidate	Votes	%	±%
Labour	R. B. Prain*	2,066	40.9	−21.1
Conservative	E. Mawdsley	2,052	40.6	−7.5
Liberal	S. Needoff	937	18.5	−16.2
Majority		14	0.3	−6.7
Turnout		5,055		
Labour hold		Swing		

=== Chorlton-cum-Hardy ===
Chorlton-cum-Hardy
Party	Candidate	Votes	%	±%
Conservative	A. Wood*	4,965	83.0	+4.1
Labour	C. E. Bedgood	1,016	17.0	−4.1
Majority		3,949	66.0	+8.2
Turnout		5,981		
Conservative hold		Swing		

=== Collegiate Church ===
Collegiate Church
Party	Candidate	Votes	%	±%
Labour	R. Finkel*	2,285	72.4	−2.2
Conservative	R. Rickless	691	21.9	+1.0
Communist	M. I. Druck	178	5.7	+1.2
Majority		1,594	50.5	−3.2
Turnout		3,054		
Labour hold		Swing		

=== Crumpsall ===
Crumpsall
Party	Candidate	Votes	%	±%
Conservative	A. A. Clapham*	4,699	65.7	+3.3
Labour	A. O'Toole	2,452	34.3	−1.3
Majority		2,247	31.4	+4.6
Turnout		7,151		
Conservative hold		Swing		

=== Didsbury ===
Didsbury
Party	Candidate	Votes	%	±%
Conservative	W. White*	4,317	84.7	+6.2
Labour	W. Gallacher	777	15.3	−5.0
Majority		3,540	69.4	+11.2
Turnout		5,094		
Conservative hold		Swing		

=== Gorton North ===
Gorton North
Party	Candidate	Votes	%	±%
Labour	C. Bentley*	3,995	60.2	−7.5
Conservative	S. W. Marshall	2,473	37.2	+7.2
Communist	J. Kay	172	2.6	+0.3
Majority		1,522	23.0	−14.7
Turnout		6,640		
Labour hold		Swing		

=== Gorton South ===
Gorton South
Party	Candidate	Votes	%	±%
Labour	E. Kirkman*	2,703	54.4	−5.2
Conservative	A. E. Owen	2,144	43.1	+4.7
Communist	A. Wilde	125	2.5	+0.5
Majority		539	11.3	−9.9
Turnout		4,972		
Labour hold		Swing		

=== Harpurhey ===
Harpurhey
Party	Candidate	Votes	%	±%
Conservative	J. Chatterton*	3,754	54.8	+11.0
Labour	J. B. Ogden	3,097	45.2	−9.8
Majority		657	9.6	
Turnout		6,698		
Conservative hold		Swing		

=== Levenshulme ===
Levenshulme
Party	Candidate	Votes	%	±%
Conservative	O. Lodge*	4,638	71.0	+6.8
Labour	B. Coulan	1,890	29.0	−5.6
Majority		2,748	42.0	+12.4
Turnout		6,528		
Conservative hold		Swing		

=== Lightbowne ===
Lightbowne
Party	Candidate	Votes	%	±%
Conservative	J. H. Ferrington	4,539	53.1	
Labour	M. Tylecote*	3,098	36.3	
Liberal	C. N. Higginson	903	10.6	
Majority		1,441	16.8	
Turnout		8,540		
Conservative gain from Labour		Swing		

=== Longsight ===
Longsight
Party	Candidate	Votes	%	±%
Conservative	E. Elliott*	3,638	64.3	−0.6
Labour	J. Conway	1,508	26.6	−8.5
Liberal	F. N. Wedlock	513	9.1	N/A
Majority		2,130	37.7	+7.9
Turnout		5,659		
Conservative hold		Swing		

=== Miles Platting ===
Miles Platting
Party	Candidate	Votes	%	±%
Labour	J. H. F. Eccles	2,445	56.6	−6.1
Conservative	E. D. Houseley	1,873	43.4	+6.1
Majority		572	13.2	−12.2
Turnout		4,318		
Labour hold		Swing		

=== Moss Side East ===
Moss Side East
Party	Candidate	Votes	%	±%
Conservative	J. E. Pheasey*	3,086	63.5	+10.3
Labour	W. A. Downward	1,775	36.5	−7.9
Majority		1,311	27.0	+18.2
Turnout		4,861		
Conservative hold		Swing		

=== Moss Side West ===
Moss Side West
Party	Candidate	Votes	%	±%
Conservative	A. Smith*	3,440	61.4	+6.3
Labour	H. Collins	2,161	38.6	−6.3
Majority		1,279	22.8	+12.6
Turnout		5,601		
Conservative hold		Swing		

=== Moston ===
Moston
Party	Candidate	Votes	%	±%
Conservative	M. Dunn*	3,970	53.0	+6.4
Labour	R. Latham	3,519	47.0	−6.4
Majority		451	6.0	
Turnout		7,489		
Conservative hold		Swing		

=== New Cross ===
New Cross
Party	Candidate	Votes	%	±%
Labour	M. Knight*	2,456	55.6	−2.8
Conservative	J. M. Connolly	1,850	41.9	+0.3
Independent	F. Dowling	113	2.5	N/A
Majority		606	13.7	−3.1
Turnout		4,419		
Labour hold		Swing		

=== Newton Heath ===
Newton Heath
Party	Candidate	Votes	%	±%
Labour	W. Binns*	3,268	55.3	−4.3
Conservative	W. H. Priestnall	2,644	44.7	+4.3
Majority		624	10.6	−8.6
Turnout		5,912		
Labour hold		Swing		

=== Newtown ===
Newtown
Party	Candidate	Votes	%	±%
Labour	M. J. Griffin*	2,666	62.0	−7.0
Conservative	W. B. Kinsey	1,631	38.0	+7.0
Majority		1,035	24.0	−14.0
Turnout		4,297		
Labour hold		Swing		

=== Northenden ===
Northenden
Party	Candidate	Votes	%	±%
Conservative	L. Jacobs*	4,167	67.0	+4.2
Labour	H. Lloyd	2,053	33.0	−4.2
Majority		2,114	34.0	+8.4
Turnout		6,220		
Conservative hold		Swing		

=== Old Moat ===
Old Moat
Party	Candidate	Votes	%	±%
Conservative	W. R. Swan	3,601	70.2	+9.6
Labour	W. M. Parkinson	1,531	29.8	−9.6
Majority		2,070	40.4	+19.2
Turnout		5,132		
Conservative hold		Swing		

=== Openshaw ===
Openshaw
Party	Candidate	Votes	%	±%
Labour	S. Jolly*	3,884	57.8	−1.0
Conservative	J. C. Robertson	2,614	38.9	0
Communist	T. Rowlandson	217	3.3	+1.0
Majority		1,270	18.9	−1.0
Turnout		6,715		
Labour hold		Swing		

=== Rusholme ===
Rusholme
Party	Candidate	Votes	%	±%
Conservative	A. T. Barratt*	4,270	81.7	+8.1
Labour	J. D. Paul	958	18.3	−8.8
Majority		3,312	63.4	+17.6
Turnout		5,228		
Conservative hold		Swing		

=== St. George's ===
St. George's
Party	Candidate	Votes	%	±%
Labour	K. Collis	2,588	51.2	−9.0
Conservative	J. E. McManus	2,273	45.1	+5.3
Liberal	R. Frere	191	3.7	N/A
Majority		315	6.2	−14.2
Turnout		5,052		
Labour gain from Conservative		Swing		

=== St. Luke's ===
St. Luke's
Party	Candidate	Votes	%	±%
Conservative	A. Holberry*	3,052	60.0	+8.1
Labour	W. Massey	2,034	40.0	−8.1
Majority		1,018	20.0	+16.2
Turnout		5,086		
Conservative hold		Swing		

=== St. Mark's ===
St. Mark's
Party	Candidate	Votes	%	±%
Labour	H. Eastwood*	3,041	52.6	−5.7
Conservative	C. E. Toll	2,743	47.4	+5.7
Majority		298	5.2	−11.4
Turnout		5,784		
Labour hold		Swing		

=== St. Peter's ===
St. Peter's
Party	Candidate	Votes	%	±%
Conservative	N. Beer*	2,114	84.0	+14.3
Labour	T. Lomas	403	16.0	−14.3
Majority		1,711	68.0	+28.6
Turnout		2,517		
Conservative hold		Swing		

=== Withington ===
Withington
Party	Candidate	Votes	%	±%
Conservative	W. A. Stovell*	3,917	70.0	−1.7
Labour	N. Morris	896	16.0	−2.2
Liberal	F. W. Wilson	780	14.0	+3.9
Majority		3,021	54.0	+0.5
Turnout		5,593		
Conservative hold		Swing		

=== Wythenshawe ===
Wythenshawe
Party	Candidate	Votes	%	±%
Labour	W. Frost	6,779	54.9	+1.8
Conservative	W. Davies*	5,579	45.1	+0.2
Majority		1,200	9.8	+1.6
Turnout		12,358		
Labour gain from Conservative		Swing		

== Aldermanic elections ==
=== Aldermanic election, 5 September 1951 ===
Caused by the death on 29 July 1951 of Alderman William Somerville (Conservative, elected as an alderman by the council on 2 February 1949).

In his place, Councillor Tom Larrad (Labour, St. Mark's, elected 17 January 1933) was elected as an alderman by the council on 5 September 1951.

Party	Alderman	Ward	Term expires
Labour	Tom Larrad	Levenshulme	1952

=== Aldermanic election, 6 February 1952 ===
Caused by the death on 10 January 1952 of Alderman Leonard Cox (Labour, elected as an alderman by the council on 15 February 1939).

In his place, Councillor Robert Malcolm (Labour, Bradford, elected 1 November 1933; previously 1928-31) was elected as an alderman by the council on 6 February 1952.

Party	Alderman	Ward	Term expires
Labour	Robert Malcolm	Longsight	1952

== By-elections between 1951 and 1952 ==
=== St. Mark's, 29 November 1951 ===
Caused by the election as an alderman of Councillor Tom Larrad (Labour, St. Mark's, elected 17 January 1933) on 5 September 1951 following the death on 29 July 1951 of Alderman William Somerville (Conservative, elected as an alderman by the council on 2 February 1949).

St. Mark's
Party	Candidate	Votes	%	±%
Labour	W. Shaw	2,785	57.5	+4.9
Conservative	P. J. Taylor	2,062	42.5	−4.9
Majority		723	15.0	+9.8
Turnout		4,847		
Labour hold		Swing		
