= 1958 Manchester City Council election =

Local election in Manchester, England

- 8 May 1958

40 of 152 seats to Manchester City Council 77 seats needed for a majority
	First party	Second party	Third party
Party	Labour	Conservative	Liberal
Last election	24 seats, 53.7%	14 seats, 41.6%	0 seats, 4.2%
Seats before	90	58	4
Seats won	26	14	0
Seats after	95	54	3
Seat change	▲5	▼4	▼1
Popular vote	89,450	62,977	12,770
Percentage	53.7%	37.8%	7.7%
Swing	Steady	▼3.8%	▲3.5%
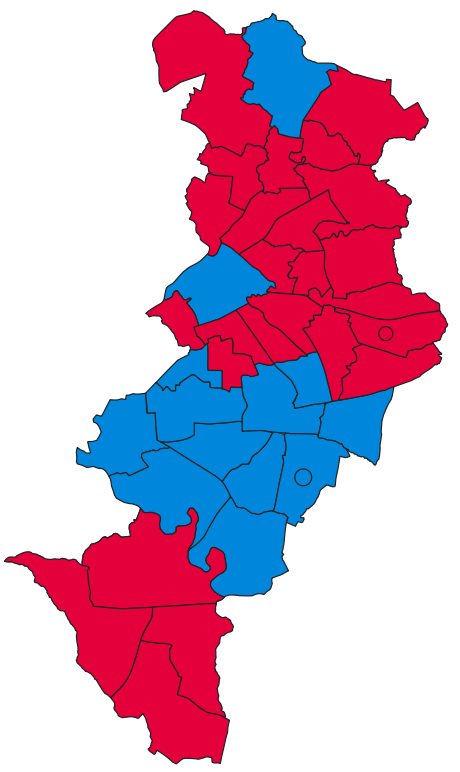
- Map of results of 1958 election
Leader of the Council before election
Labour
Leader of the Council after election
Labour

Elections to Manchester City Council were held on Thursday, 8 May 1958. One third of the councillors seats were up for election, with each successful candidate to serve a three-year term of office. The Labour Party retained overall control of the council.

== Election result ==
Party	Votes		Seats			Full Council	
Labour Party	89,450 (53.7%)	Steady	26 (65.0%)	26 / 40	▲5	95 (62.5%)	95 / 152
Conservative Party	62,977 (37.8%)	▼3.8	14 (35.0%)	14 / 40	▼4	54 (35.5%)	54 / 152
Liberal Party	12,770 (7.7%)	▲3.5	0 (0.0%)	0 / 40	▼1	3 (2.0%)	3 / 152
Communist	695 (0.4%)	▲0.2	0 (0.0%)	0 / 40	Steady	0 (0.0%)	0 / 152
Independent	458 (0.3%)	Steady	0 (0.0%)	0 / 40	Steady	0 (0.0%)	0 / 152
Union Movement	101 (0.1%)	N/A	0 (0.0%)	0 / 40	N/A	0 (0.0%)	0 / 152

=== Full council ===
↓
95	3	54

=== Aldermen ===
↓
21	3	14

=== Councillors ===
↓
74	40

== Ward results ==
=== Alexandra Park ===
Alexandra Park
Party	Candidate	Votes	%	±%
Conservative	L. Bailey*	2,839	51.6	−2.3
Liberal	G. E. Sharpe	1,791	32.6	+6.8
Labour	A. A. Dandy	869	15.8	−4.5
Majority		1,048	19.0	−9.1
Turnout		5,499		
Conservative hold		Swing		

=== All Saints' ===
All Saints'
Party	Candidate	Votes	%	±%
Labour	T. Thomas	1,980	77.5	+6.7
Conservative	W. J. Geddes	574	22.5	−6.7
Majority		1,406	55.0	+13.4
Turnout		2,554		
Labour hold		Swing		

=== Ardwick ===
Ardwick
Party	Candidate	Votes	%	±%
Labour	W. M. Parkinson*	1,582	63.0	−7.4
Conservative	G. Taylor	929	37.0	+7.4
Majority		653	26.0	−14.8
Turnout		2,511		
Labour hold		Swing		

=== Baguley ===
Baguley
Party	Candidate	Votes	%	±%
Labour	T. H. Jenkins*	3,227	60.0	0
Conservative	W. Fuller	2,152	40.0	0
Majority		1,075	20.0	0
Turnout		5,379		
Labour hold		Swing		

=== Barlow Moor ===
Barlow Moor
Party	Candidate	Votes	%	±%
Conservative	W. J. Pegge*	1,775	59.2	+1.4
Labour	S. E. Tucker	1,222	40.8	−1.4
Majority		553	18.4	+2.8
Turnout		2,997		
Conservative hold		Swing		

=== Benchill ===
Benchill
Party	Candidate	Votes	%	±%
Labour	H. Lloyd*	2,456	59.1	+0.5
Conservative	E. Birley	1,623	39.1	−2.3
Communist	G. Taylor	75	1.8	N/A
Majority		833	20.0	+2.8
Turnout		4,154		
Labour hold		Swing		

=== Beswick ===
Beswick
Party	Candidate	Votes	%	±%
Labour	R. Malcolm*	2,623	83.9	−0.9
Conservative	D. E. Logan	505	16.1	+0.9
Majority		2,118	67.8	−1.8
Turnout		3,128		
Labour hold		Swing		

=== Blackley ===
Blackley
Party	Candidate	Votes	%	±%
Conservative	W. Burrows	3,193	51.3	−4.9
Labour	L. Kelly	3,032	48.7	+4.9
Majority		161	2.6	−9.8
Turnout		6,225		
Conservative hold		Swing		

=== Bradford ===
Bradford
Party	Candidate	Votes	%	±%
Labour	T. Lomas*	3,081	79.1	−2.7
Conservative	D. Mawe	816	20.9	+2.7
Majority		2,265	58.2	−5.4
Turnout		3,897		
Labour hold		Swing		

=== Burnage ===
Burnage (2 vacancies)
Party	Candidate	Votes	%	±%
Conservative	G. Lord*	3,284	60.4	+5.0
Conservative	H. Platt	3,176	58.4	+3.0
Labour	W. S. Spink	2,294	42.2	−2.4
Labour	H. Rowley	2,121	39.0	−5.6
Majority		882	16.2	+5.4
Turnout		5,438		
Conservative hold		Swing		
Conservative hold		Swing		

=== Cheetham ===
Cheetham
Party	Candidate	Votes	%	±%
Labour	H. Goldstone*	2,095	54.3	+3.3
Liberal	S. Needoff	1,765	45.7	−3.3
Majority		330	8.6	+6.6
Turnout		3,860		
Labour hold		Swing		

=== Chorlton-cum-Hardy ===
Chorlton-cum-Hardy
Party	Candidate	Votes	%	±%
Conservative	M. Whittaker*	3,283	72.0	−1.0
Labour	R. P. Greenwood	1,278	28.0	+1.0
Majority		2,005	44.0	−2.0
Turnout		4,561		
Conservative hold		Swing		

=== Collegiate Church ===
Collegiate Church
Party	Candidate	Votes	%	±%
Labour	B. S. Langton*	2,047	88.8	+3.5
Conservative	T. E. Dillon	172	7.5	−2.5
Communist	K. Bloch	85	3.7	−1.0
Majority		1,875	81.3	+6.0
Turnout		2,304		
Labour hold		Swing		

=== Crumpsall ===
Crumpsall
Party	Candidate	Votes	%	±%
Labour	F. J. Balcombe	4,055	54.0	+7.2
Conservative	S. Tomlinson*	3,458	46.0	−7.2
Majority		597	8.0	
Turnout		7,513		
Labour gain from Conservative		Swing		

=== Didsbury ===
Didsbury
Party	Candidate	Votes	%	±%
Conservative	M. R. Crawford	2,714	46.1	−7.2
Liberal	M. MacInerney*	2,601	44.2	+8.4
Labour	F. Firth	572	9.7	−2.8
Majority		113	1.9	−14.2
Turnout		5,887		
Conservative gain from Liberal		Swing		

=== Gorton North ===
Gorton North (2 vacancies)
Party	Candidate	Votes	%	±%
Labour	N. Leech*	3,361	85.3	+9.6
Labour	W. Higgins	3,294	83.6	+7.9
Conservative	S. Bancroft	614	15.6	−8.7
Majority		2,680	68.0	+16.6
Turnout		3,942		
Labour hold		Swing		
Labour hold		Swing		

=== Gorton South ===
Gorton South
Party	Candidate	Votes	%	±%
Labour	H. J. Batson*	2,234	66.6	−1.7
Conservative	H. Woodman	1,118	33.4	+1.7
Majority		1,116	33.2	−3.4
Turnout		3,352		
Labour hold		Swing		

=== Harpurhey ===
Harpurhey
Party	Candidate	Votes	%	±%
Labour	H. P. J. Hinderer*	2,466	67.0	+2.8
Conservative	D. Simms	1,212	33.0	−2.8
Majority		1,254	34.0	+5.6
Turnout		3,678		
Labour hold		Swing		

=== Hugh Oldham ===
Hugh Oldham
Party	Candidate	Votes	%	±%
Labour	H. Langan	2,260	83.4	−2.5
Conservative	J. Wilkinson	337	12.4	+1.9
Communist	E. Cohen	114	4.2	+0.6
Majority		1,923	71.0	−4.4
Turnout		2,711		
Labour hold		Swing		

=== Levenshulme ===
Levenshulme
Party	Candidate	Votes	%	±%
Conservative	J. Bowes*	2,341	44.9	−19.2
Labour	A. E. Bowden	1,672	32.1	−3.8
Liberal	G. W. Oliver	1,198	23.0	N/A
Majority		1,143	12.8	−15.4
Turnout		5,211		
Conservative hold		Swing		

=== Lightbowne ===
Lightbowne
Party	Candidate	Votes	%	±%
Labour	K. Franklin	3,305	46.7	+3.7
Conservative	J. Chatterton*	2,210	31.2	−11.3
Liberal	F. N. Wedlock	1,563	22.1	+7.6
Majority		1,095	15.5	+15.0
Turnout		7,078		
Labour gain from Conservative		Swing		

=== Longsight ===
Longsight
Party	Candidate	Votes	%	±%
Conservative	J. G. Hopkins*	2,360	59.3	+6.4
Labour	R. E. Talbot	1,618	40.7	−6.4
Majority		742	18.6	+12.8
Turnout		3,978		
Conservative hold		Swing		

=== Miles Platting ===
Miles Platting
Party	Candidate	Votes	%	±%
Labour	R. P. Hughes	1,888	73.1	+3.6
Conservative	A. Gilbert	693	26.9	−3.6
Majority		1,195	46.2	+7.2
Turnout		2,581		
Labour hold		Swing		

=== Moss Side East ===
Moss Side East
Party	Candidate	Votes	%	±%
Labour	C. E. Bedgood	2,022	59.7	−1.9
Conservative	H. Boff	1,240	36.6	−1.8
Communist	T. Wright	127	3.7	N/A
Majority		782	23.1	−0.1
Turnout		3,389		
Labour gain from Conservative		Swing		

=== Moss Side West ===
Moss Side West
Party	Candidate	Votes	%	±%
Conservative	P. Buckley*	2,128	48.5	+2.7
Labour	H. Conway	1,705	38.8	−5.4
Independent	G. J. Playford	458	10.4	+0.4
Union Movement	N. Kennedy	101	2.3	N/A
Majority		423	9.7	+8.1
Turnout		4,392		
Conservative hold		Swing		

=== Moston ===
Moston
Party	Candidate	Votes	%	±%
Labour	C. C. Lamb*	3,600	57.8	+3.3
Conservative	W. Quick	2,626	42.2	−3.3
Majority		974	15.6	+6.6
Turnout		6,226		
Labour hold		Swing		

=== New Cross ===
New Cross
Party	Candidate	Votes	%	±%
Labour	C. Blackwell*	1,471	77.7	+6.1
Conservative	L. Hampson	421	22.3	−6.1
Majority		1,050	55.4	+12.2
Turnout		1,892		
Labour hold		Swing		

=== Newton Heath ===
Newton Heath
Party	Candidate	Votes	%	±%
Labour	A. Logan*	2,660	70.5	−1.3
Conservative	A. Johnson	1,112	29.5	+1.3
Majority		1,548	41.0	−2.6
Turnout		3,772		
Labour hold		Swing		

=== Northenden ===
Northenden
Party	Candidate	Votes	%	±%
Labour	J. Davis	3,232	47.3	−4.9
Conservative	A. Williamson*	2,134	31.2	−16.6
Liberal	R. H. Hargreaves	1,469	21.5	N/A
Majority		1,098	16.1	+7.7
Turnout		6,835		
Labour gain from Conservative		Swing		

=== Old Moat ===
Old Moat
Party	Candidate	Votes	%	±%
Conservative	H. P. Humphris*	1,767	47.1	−3.1
Labour	K. Edwards	1,397	37.2	+3.3
Liberal	R. H. Hargreaves	591	15.7	−0.2
Majority		370	9.9	−6.4
Turnout		3,755		
Conservative hold		Swing		

=== Openshaw ===
Openshaw
Party	Candidate	Votes	%	±%
Labour	L. Thomas*	3,428	79.6	+4.9
Conservative	J. Mitton	723	16.8	−5.5
Communist	J. Hodgson	157	3.6	+0.6
Majority		2,705	62.8	+10.4
Turnout		4,308		
Labour hold		Swing		

=== Rusholme ===
Rusholme
Party	Candidate	Votes	%	±%
Conservative	H. Stockdale*	2,563	63.5	−3.0
Labour	H. Reid	1,472	36.5	+3.0
Majority		1,091	27.0	−6.0
Turnout		4,035		
Conservative hold		Swing		

=== St. George's ===
St. George's
Party	Candidate	Votes	%	±%
Labour	E. Mellor*	2,267	81.9	+10.1
Conservative	J. Logan	501	18.1	−10.1
Majority		1,766	63.8	+20.2
Turnout		2,768		
Labour hold		Swing		

=== St. Luke's ===
St. Luke's
Party	Candidate	Votes	%	±%
Labour	S. C. Rimmer	2,226	59.2	+3.6
Conservative	R. D. Doherty	1,531	40.8	−3.6
Majority		695	18.4	+7.2
Turnout		3,757		
Labour gain from Conservative		Swing		

=== St. Mark's ===
St. Mark's
Party	Candidate	Votes	%	±%
Labour	W. Shaw*	2,781	77.9	+4.6
Conservative	W. H. Fleetwood	791	22.1	−4.6
Majority		1,990	55.8	+9.2
Turnout		3,572		
Labour hold		Swing		

=== St. Peter's ===
St. Peter's
Party	Candidate	Votes	%	±%
Conservative	N. G. Westbrook*	1,145	72.7	+1.2
Labour	V. Loran	429	27.3	−1.2
Majority		716	45.4	+2.4
Turnout		1,574		
Conservative hold		Swing		

=== Withington ===
Withington
Party	Candidate	Votes	%	±%
Conservative	J. McGrath*	2,247	48.0	−26.9
Liberal	A. Share	1,792	38.3	N/A
Labour	J. Platt	645	13.7	−11.4
Majority		455	9.7	−40.1
Turnout		4,684		
Conservative hold		Swing		

=== Woodhouse Park ===
Woodhouse Park
Party	Candidate	Votes	%	±%
Labour	W. Smith*	3,483	81.2	+2.5
Conservative	F. W. Harrison	670	15.6	−4.7
Communist	E. Holt	137	3.2	N/A
Majority		2,813	65.6	+8.2
Turnout		4,290		
Labour hold		Swing		
