= 1959 Manchester City Council election =

Local election in Manchester, England

- 7 May 1959

38 of 152 seats to Manchester City Council 77 seats needed for a majority
	First party	Second party	Third party
Party	Labour	Conservative	Liberal
Last election	26 seats, 53.7%	14 seats, 37.8%	0 seats, 7.7%
Seats before	95	54	3
Seats won	21	17	0
Seats after	92	57	3
Seat change	▼3	▲3	Steady
Popular vote	76,856	74,294	16,973
Percentage	45.4%	43.9%	10.0%
Swing	▼8.3%	▲6.1%	▲2.3%
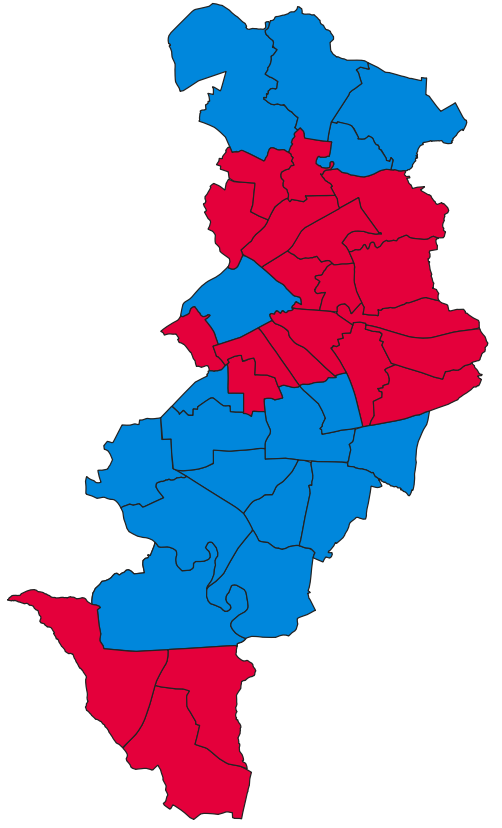
- Map of results of 1959 election
Leader of the Council before election
Labour
Leader of the Council after election
Labour

Elections to Manchester City Council were held on Thursday, 7 May 1959. One third of the councillors seats were up for election, with each successful candidate to serve a three-year term of office. The Labour Party retained overall control of the council.

== Election result ==
Party	Votes		Seats			Full Council	
Labour Party	76,856 (45.4%)	▼8.3	21 (55.3%)	21 / 38	▼3	92 (60.5%)	92 / 152
Conservative Party	74,294 (43.9%)	▲6.1	17 (44.7%)	17 / 38	▲3	57 (37.5%)	57 / 152
Liberal Party	16,973 (10.0%)	▲2.3	0 (0.0%)	0 / 38	▼1	3 (2.0%)	3 / 152
Communist	890 (0.5%)	▲0.1	0 (0.0%)	0 / 38	Steady	0 (0.0%)	0 / 152
Independent Labour	249 (0.1%)	N/A	0 (0.0%)	0 / 38	N/A	0 (0.0%)	0 / 152
Union Movement	135 (0.1%)	Steady	0 (0.0%)	0 / 38	Steady	0 (0.0%)	0 / 152

=== Full council ===
↓
92	3	57

=== Aldermen ===
↓
21	3	14

=== Councillors ===
↓
71	43

== Ward results ==
=== Alexandra Park ===
Alexandra Park
Party	Candidate	Votes	%	±%
Conservative	H. Ward*	3,413	61.6	+10.0
Liberal	L. Thornton Smith	1,314	23.7	−8.9
Labour	H. Conway	817	14.7	−1.1
Majority		2,099	37.9	+18.9
Turnout		5,544		
Conservative hold		Swing		

=== All Saints' ===
All Saints'
Party	Candidate	Votes	%	±%
Labour	F. P. Evans*	1,810	72.7	−4.8
Conservative	R. W. Phillips	679	27.3	+4.8
Majority		1,131	45.4	−9.6
Turnout		2,489		
Labour hold		Swing		

=== Ardwick ===
Ardwick
Party	Candidate	Votes	%	±%
Labour	V. Wilson*	2,216	63.2	+0.2
Conservative	G. Taylor	1,288	36.8	−0.2
Majority		928	26.4	+0.4
Turnout		3,504		
Labour hold		Swing		

=== Baguley ===
Baguley
Party	Candidate	Votes	%	±%
Labour	F. H. Price*	3,066	51.9	−8.1
Conservative	W. Fuller	2,836	48.1	+8.1
Majority		230	3.8	−16.2
Turnout		5,902		
Labour hold		Swing		

=== Barlow Moor ===
Barlow Moor
Party	Candidate	Votes	%	±%
Conservative	A. Hooley*	1,945	64.5	+5.4
Labour	S. E. Tucker	1,070	35.5	−5.3
Majority		875	29.0	+10.6
Turnout		3,015		
Conservative hold		Swing		

=== Benchill ===
Benchill
Party	Candidate	Votes	%	±%
Labour	H. S. Gatley*	2,414	50.5	−8.6
Conservative	A. Williamson	2,225	46.5	+7.4
Communist	M. Taylor	141	3.0	+1.2
Majority		189	4.0	−16.0
Turnout		4,780		
Labour hold		Swing		

=== Beswick ===
Beswick
Party	Candidate	Votes	%	±%
Labour	J. G. Birtles*	2,785	80.6	−3.3
Conservative	H. L. W. Glover	672	19.4	+3.3
Majority		2,113	61.2	−6.6
Turnout		3,457		
Labour hold		Swing		

=== Blackley ===
Blackley
Party	Candidate	Votes	%	±%
Conservative	J. A. Lynch*	3,398	47.6	−3.7
Labour	E. McGinty	2,459	34.4	−14.3
Liberal	D. A. Green	1,281	18.0	N/A
Majority		939	13.2	+10.6
Turnout		7,138		
Conservative hold		Swing		

=== Bradford ===
Bradford
Party	Candidate	Votes	%	±%
Labour	G. McCall*	2,865	71.8	−7.3
Conservative	J. Mitton	1,124	28.2	+7.3
Majority		1,741	43.6	−14.6
Turnout		3,989		
Labour hold		Swing		

=== Burnage ===
Burnage
Party	Candidate	Votes	%	±%
Conservative	H. Platt*	3,115	50.3	−10.1
Labour	W. S. Spink	1,900	30.7	−11.5
Liberal	H. Tobias	1,178	19.0	N/A
Majority		1,215	19.6	+3.4
Turnout		6,193		
Conservative hold		Swing		

=== Cheetham ===
Cheetham
Party	Candidate	Votes	%	±%
Labour	M. P. Pariser*	1,650	45.5	−8.8
Liberal	S. Needoff	1,614	44.5	−1.2
Conservative	F. Hargreaves	360	10.0	N/A
Majority		36	1.0	−7.6
Turnout		3,624		
Labour hold		Swing		

=== Chorlton-cum-Hardy ===
Chorlton-cum-Hardy
Party	Candidate	Votes	%	±%
Conservative	G. W. G. Fitzsimons*	3,942	77.2	+5.2
Labour	R. Grills	1,167	22.8	−5.2
Majority		2,775	54.4	+10.4
Turnout		5,109		
Conservative hold		Swing		

=== Collegiate Church ===
Collegiate Church
Party	Candidate	Votes	%	±%
Labour	E. Mendell*	1,780	80.9	−7.9
Conservative	K. Edis	288	13.1	+7.1
Communist	A. Gadian	133	6.0	+2.7
Majority		1,492	67.8	−13.5
Turnout		2,201		
Labour hold		Swing		

=== Crumpsall ===
Crumpsall
Party	Candidate	Votes	%	±%
Conservative	R. Collier*	3,709	45.5	−0.5
Labour	S. N. M. Moxley*	2,998	36.8	−17.2
Liberal	I. Savage	1,440	17.7	N/A
Majority		711	8.7	
Turnout		8,147		
Conservative hold		Swing		

=== Didsbury ===
Didsbury
Party	Candidate	Votes	%	±%
Conservative	D. K. Lee*	3,275	53.4	+7.3
Liberal	M. MacInerney	2,400	39.1	−5.1
Labour	A. Williams	462	7.5	−1.2
Majority		875	14.3	+12.4
Turnout		6,137		
Conservative hold		Swing		

=== Gorton North ===
Gorton North
Party	Candidate	Votes	%	±%
Labour	W. Higgins*	3,628	68.7	−16.6
Conservative	C. N. Clark	1,654	31.3	+15.7
Majority		1,974	37.4	−30.6
Turnout		5,282		
Labour hold		Swing		

=== Gorton South ===
Gorton South
Party	Candidate	Votes	%	±%
Labour	H. Wimbury*	2,254	61.3	−5.3
Conservative	H. Woodman	1,422	38.7	+5.3
Majority		832	22.6	−10.6
Turnout		3,676		
Labour hold		Swing		

=== Harpurhey ===
Harpurhey
Party	Candidate	Votes	%	±%
Labour	E. Grant*	2,473	61.2	−5.8
Conservative	A. Jones	1,568	38.8	+5.8
Majority		905	22.4	−11.6
Turnout		4,041		
Labour hold		Swing		

=== Hugh Oldham ===
Hugh Oldham
Party	Candidate	Votes	%	±%
Labour	J. B. Ogden*	2,076	75.5	−7.9
Conservative	I. Burgess	492	17.9	+5.5
Communist	E. Cohen	180	6.6	+2.4
Majority		1,584	57.6	−13.4
Turnout		2,748		
Labour hold		Swing		

=== Levenshulme ===
Levenshulme
Party	Candidate	Votes	%	±%
Conservative	R. A. Fieldhouse*	2,602	47.6	+2.7
Labour	A. E. Bowden	1,508	27.6	−4.5
Liberal	G. E. Sharp	1,357	24.8	+1.8
Majority		1,094	20.0	+7.2
Turnout		5,467		
Conservative hold		Swing		

=== Lightbowne ===
Lightbowne
Party	Candidate	Votes	%	±%
Conservative	H. Piggott	3,399	46.9	+15.7
Labour	L. Kelly	2,688	37.1	−9.6
Liberal	F. N. Wedlock	1,153	16.0	−6.1
Majority		711	9.8	−5.7
Turnout		7,240		
Conservative hold		Swing		

=== Longsight ===
Longsight
Party	Candidate	Votes	%	±%
Conservative	H. Sharp*	2,490	60.6	+1.3
Labour	R. E. Talbot	1,619	39.4	−1.3
Majority		871	21.2	+2.6
Turnout		4,109		
Conservative hold		Swing		

=== Miles Platting ===
Miles Platting
Party	Candidate	Votes	%	±%
Labour	C. R. Morris*	1,716	67.0	−6.1
Conservative	J. Hall	847	33.0	+6.1
Majority		869	34.0	−12.2
Turnout		2,563		
Labour hold		Swing		

=== Moss Side East ===
Moss Side East
Party	Candidate	Votes	%	±%
Labour	W. A. Downward*	2,080	53.4	−6.3
Conservative	J. Lang	1,681	43.1	+6.5
Communist	T. Wright	136	3.5	−0.2
Majority		399	10.2	−12.9
Turnout		3,897		
Labour hold		Swing		

=== Moss Side West ===
Moss Side West
Party	Candidate	Votes	%	±%
Conservative	J. Bodden	2,885	59.0	+10.5
Labour	B. Lawson*	1,868	38.2	−0.6
Union Movement	G. A. Webb	135	2.6	+0.3
Majority		1,017	20.8	+11.1
Turnout		4,888		
Conservative gain from Labour		Swing		

=== Moston ===
Moston
Party	Candidate	Votes	%	±%
Conservative	K. E. Goulding	2,990	42.0	−0.2
Labour	W. McGuirk*	2,928	41.2	−16.6
Liberal	P. L. Marron	1,195	16.8	N/A
Majority		62	0.8	
Turnout		7,113		
Conservative gain from Labour		Swing		

=== New Cross ===
New Cross
Party	Candidate	Votes	%	±%
Labour	W. Murray*	1,251	76.0	−1.7
Conservative	M. Buckley	396	24.0	+1.7
Majority		855	52.0	−3.4
Turnout		1,647		
Labour hold		Swing		

=== Newton Heath ===
Newton Heath
Party	Candidate	Votes	%	±%
Labour	W. Lister*	2,275	58.2	−12.3
Conservative	A. Johnson	1,631	41.8	+12.3
Majority		644	16.4	−24.6
Turnout		3,906		
Labour hold		Swing		

=== Northenden ===
Northenden
Party	Candidate	Votes	%	±%
Conservative	E. A. Walmsley	2,648	39.6	+8.4
Labour	R. Sheldon	2,608	39.0	−8.3
Liberal	R. H. Hargreaves	1,434	21.4	−0.1
Majority		40	0.6	
Turnout		6,690		
Conservative gain from Labour		Swing		

=== Old Moat ===
Old Moat
Party	Candidate	Votes	%	±%
Conservative	W. Sharp*	2,119	51.0	+3.9
Labour	R. P. Greenwood	1,145	27.6	−9.6
Liberal	P. McGregor	890	21.4	+5.7
Majority		974	23.4	+13.5
Turnout		4,154		
Conservative hold		Swing		

=== Openshaw ===
Openshaw
Party	Candidate	Votes	%	±%
Labour	M. E. Morley*	3,233	68.6	−11.0
Conservative	P. Collins	1,323	28.1	+11.3
Communist	H. Holland	159	3.3	−0.3
Majority		1,910	40.5	−22.3
Turnout		4,715		
Labour hold		Swing		

=== Rusholme ===
Rusholme
Party	Candidate	Votes	%	±%
Conservative	K. Ollerenshaw*	3,066	70.0	+6.5
Labour	K. Graham	1,317	30.0	−6.5
Majority		1,749	40.0	+13.0
Turnout		4,383		
Conservative hold		Swing		

=== St. George's ===
St. George's
Party	Candidate	Votes	%	±%
Labour	G. Mann*	2,044	75.2	−6.7
Conservative	D. Meakin	675	24.8	+6.7
Majority		1,369	50.4	−13.4
Turnout		2,719		
Labour hold		Swing		

=== St. Luke's ===
St. Luke's
Party	Candidate	Votes	%	±%
Labour	W. Massey*	1,835	50.2	−9.0
Conservative	W. Crabtree	1,573	43.0	+2.2
Independent Labour	H. Rowley	249	6.8	N/A
Majority		262	7.2	−11.2
Turnout		3,657		
Labour hold		Swing		

=== St. Mark's ===
St. Mark's
Party	Candidate	Votes	%	±%
Labour	N. Morris*	2,492	68.7	−9.2
Conservative	W. H. Fleetwood	1,134	31.3	+9.2
Majority		1,358	37.4	−18.4
Turnout		3,626		
Labour hold		Swing		

=== St. Peter's ===
St. Peter's
Party	Candidate	Votes	%	±%
Conservative	J. Carson*	1,170	67.2	−5.5
Labour	J. Maguire	571	32.8	+5.5
Majority		599	34.4	−11.0
Turnout		1,741		
Conservative hold		Swing		

=== Withington ===
Withington
Party	Candidate	Votes	%	±%
Conservative	W. H. Scholfield*	2,808	55.0	+7.0
Liberal	A. Share	1,717	33.7	−4.6
Labour	J. Platt	577	11.3	−2.4
Majority		1,091	21.3	+11.6
Turnout		5,102		
Conservative hold		Swing		

=== Woodhouse Park ===
Woodhouse Park
Party	Candidate	Votes	%	±%
Labour	H. Reid*	3,211	67.0	−14.2
Conservative	F. W. Harrison	1,441	30.1	+14.5
Communist	E. Holt	141	2.9	−0.3
Majority		1,770	36.9	−28.7
Turnout		4,793		
Labour hold		Swing		

== Aldermanic elections ==
=== Aldermanic election, 3 February 1960 ===
Caused by the resignation on 8 January 1960 of Sir Alderman William Walker (Liberal, elected as an alderman by the council on 9 November 1909).

In his place, Councillor Robert Malcolm (Labour, Beswick, elected 10 May 1956; previously 1945-55) was elected as an alderman by the council on 3 February 1960.

Party	Alderman	Ward	Term expires
Labour	Robert Malcolm	Miles Platting	1964
