= 1966 Manchester City Council election =

UK local government election

- 12 May 1966

38 of 152 seats to Manchester City Council 77 seats needed for a majority
	First party	Second party	Third party
Party	Labour	Conservative	Liberal
Last election	20 seats, 34.2%	20 seats, 47.9%	0 seats, 12.5%
Seats before	90	58	4
Seats won	20	18	0
Seats after	87	62	3
Seat change	▼3	▲4	▼1
Popular vote	52,327	56,055	6,249
Percentage	45.1%	48.3%	5.4%
Swing	▲10.9%	▲0.4%	▼7.1%
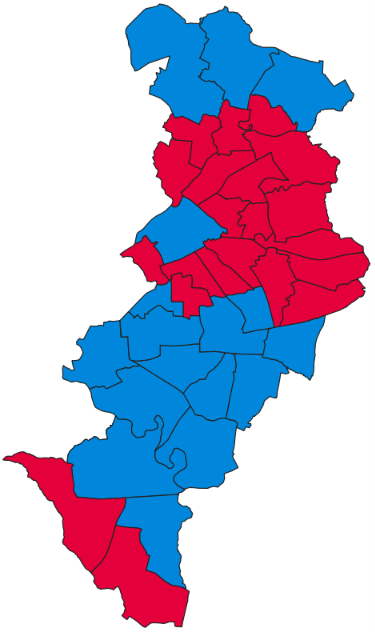
- Map of results of 1966 election
Leader of the Council before election
Labour
Leader of the Council after election
Labour

Elections to Manchester City Council were held on Thursday, 12 May 1966. One third of the councillors seats were up for election, with each successful candidate to serve a three-year term of office. The Labour Party retained overall control of the council.

== Election result ==
Party	Votes	Seats		Full Council			
Labour Party	52,327 (45.1%)	▲10.9	21 (55.3%)	21 / 38	▼3	87 (57.2%)	87 / 152
Conservative Party	56,055 (48.3%)	▲0.4	17 (44.7%)	17 / 38	▲4	62 (40.8%)	62 / 152
Liberal Party	6,249 (5.4%)	▼7.1	0 (0.0%)	0 / 38	▼1	3 (2.0%)	3 / 152
Communist	1,134 (1.0%)	▼0.1	0 (0.0%)	0 / 38	Steady	0 (0.0%)	0 / 152
Independent	356 (0.3%)	N/A	0 (0.0%)	0 / 38	N/A	0 (0.0%)	0 / 152

=== Full council ===
↓
87	3	62

=== Aldermen ===
↓
23	2	13

=== Councillors ===
↓
64	1	49

== Ward results ==
=== Alexandra Park ===
Alexandra Park
Party	Candidate	Votes	%	±%
Conservative	N. Thompson*	3,040	61.7	+3.4
Liberal	E. O. Tomlinson	1,194	24.2	−3.1
Labour	G. Hayward	691	14.1	−0.3
Majority		1,846	37.5	+6.5
Turnout		4,925		
Conservative hold		Swing		

=== All Saints' ===
All Saints'
Party	Candidate	Votes	%	±%
Labour	F. Hatton*	668	68.5	+12.4
Conservative	P. Clemerson	307	31.5	−12.4
Majority		361	37.0	+24.8
Turnout		975		
Labour hold		Swing		

=== Ardwick ===
Ardwick
Party	Candidate	Votes	%	±%
Labour	F. Taylor*	603	59.3	+3.1
Conservative	D. Taylor	414	40.7	+1.6
Majority		189	18.6	+1.6
Turnout		1,017		
Labour hold		Swing		

=== Baguley ===
Baguley
Party	Candidate	Votes	%	±%
Labour	R. A. Reddington*	2,690	52.4	+9.4
Conservative	R. A. McIlroy	2,448	47.6	+1.4
Majority		242	4.8	
Turnout		5,138		
Labour hold		Swing		

=== Barlow Moor ===
Barlow Moor
Party	Candidate	Votes	%	±%
Conservative	H. Tucker*	1,930	64.4	+21.4
Labour	R. L. Griffiths	1,067	35.6	+18.4
Majority		863	28.8	+25.6
Turnout		2,997		
Conservative gain from Liberal		Swing		

=== Benchill ===
Benchill
Party	Candidate	Votes	%	±%
Conservative	N. Pritchard	2,630	50.4	+1.1
Labour	J. Hussey*	2,467	47.3	+5.4
Communist	M. Taylor	123	2.3	+0.2
Majority		163	3.1	−4.3
Turnout		5,220		
Conservative gain from Labour		Swing		

=== Beswick ===
Beswick
Party	Candidate	Votes	%	±%
Labour	K. Eastham*	1,605	80.4	+6.1
Conservative	N. A. Green	392	19.6	−6.1
Majority		1,213	60.8	+12.2
Turnout		1,997		
Labour hold		Swing		

=== Blackley ===
Blackley
Party	Candidate	Votes	%	±%
Conservative	E. D. Kirkup*	2,666	55.8	+3.7
Labour	R. Pickering	1,993	41.7	+11.1
Communist	I. W. Luft	119	2.5	+0.8
Majority		673	14.1	−7.4
Turnout		4,778		
Conservative hold		Swing		

=== Bradford ===
Bradford
Party	Candidate	Votes	%	±%
Labour	J. Taylor*	1,974	68.7	+8.5
Conservative	L. D. Gann	823	28.6	−6.7
Communist	S. Cole	76	2.7	−1.9
Majority		1,151	40.1	+15.2
Turnout		2,873		
Labour hold		Swing		

=== Burnage ===
Burnage
Party	Candidate	Votes	%	±%
Conservative	D. J. Edwards*	2,826	60.1	+5.0
Labour	C. Stewart	1,879	39.9	+11.0
Majority		947	20.2	−6.0
Turnout		4,705		
Conservative hold		Swing		

=== Cheetham ===
Cheetham
Party	Candidate	Votes	%	±%
Labour	B. Lawson*	1,052	48.8	+7.3
Conservative	F. E. Meaden	586	27.2	+2.2
Liberal	A. F. Sullivan	450	20.9	−12.6
Communist	M. Jones	68	3.1	N/A
Majority		466	21.6	+13.6
Turnout		2,156		
Labour hold		Swing		

=== Chorlton-cum-Hardy ===
Chorlton-cum-Hardy
Party	Candidate	Votes	%	±%
Conservative	M. A. Vince*	2,632	63.0	+2.4
Labour	H. Barrett	864	20.7	+1.1
Liberal	F. E. Hartley	685	16.3	−3.2
Majority		1,768	42.3	+1.4
Turnout		4,181		
Conservative hold		Swing		

=== Collegiate Church ===
Collegiate Church
Party	Candidate	Votes	%	±%
Labour	S. A. Ogden*	653	69.9	−7.2
Conservative	G. R. Berry	153	16.4	−1.6
Communist	H. Ogden	128	13.7	+8.8
Majority		500	53.5	−5.6
Turnout		934		
Labour hold		Swing		

=== Crumpsall ===
Crumpsall
Party	Candidate	Votes	%	±%
Conservative	B. H. Taylor	2,682	52.5	+3.5
Labour	A. Zolkwer*	2,423	47.5	+12.8
Majority		259	5.0	−9.3
Turnout		5,105		
Conservative gain from Labour		Swing		

=== Didsbury ===
Didsbury
Party	Candidate	Votes	%	±%
Conservative	N. Coe*	3,333	79.6	+5.0
Labour	E. Wood	855	20.4	+8.0
Majority		2,478	59.2	−2.4
Turnout		4,188		
Conservative hold		Swing		

=== Gorton North ===
Gorton North
Party	Candidate	Votes	%	±%
Labour	P. Roddy*	2,314	63.5	+0.6
Conservative	H. V. J. Straker	1,212	33.1	+0.1
Communist	B. J. Bush	117	3.2	−0.7
Majority		1,102	30.2	+0.5
Turnout		3,643		
Labour hold		Swing		

=== Gorton South ===
Gorton South
Party	Candidate	Votes	%	±%
Labour	D. Barker*	1,440	63.6	+5.1
Conservative	D. E. Lindsey	824	36.4	−5.1
Majority		616	27.2	+10.2
Turnout		2,264		
Labour hold		Swing		

=== Harpurhey ===
Harpurhey
Party	Candidate	Votes	%	±%
Labour	A. O'Toole*	1,463	55.9	+4.6
Conservative	K. Allday	1,153	44.1	−4.6
Majority		310	11.8	+9.2
Turnout		2,616		
Labour hold		Swing		

=== Hugh Oldham ===
Hugh Oldham
Party	Candidate	Votes	%	±%
Labour	H. Humphries*	723	77.3	+10.2
Conservative	L. S. Smythe	212	22.7	−5.4
Majority		511	54.6	+15.6
Turnout		935		
Labour hold		Swing		

=== Levenshulme ===
Levenshulme
Party	Candidate	Votes	%	±%
Conservative	C. R. Robb*	2,478	61.9	+1.4
Labour	H. N. Ebrey	1,526	38.1	+10.8
Majority		952	23.8	−9.3
Turnout		4,004		
Conservative hold		Swing		

=== Lightbowne ===
Lightbowne
Party	Candidate	Votes	%	±%
Labour	L. Kelly*	2,012	41.8	+10.5
Conservative	A. Tetlow	1,935	40.2	−5.5
Liberal	H. Roche	815	17.0	−4.0
Communist	F. J. Keeney	48	1.0	−1.0
Majority		77	1.6	
Turnout		4,810		
Labour hold		Swing		

=== Longsight ===
Longsight
Party	Candidate	Votes	%	±%
Conservative	F. J. Dunn*	1,494	56.1	−10.4
Labour	A. Davidson	1,034	38.8	+8.8
Independent	V. J. Watson	87	3.3	N/A
Communist	H. Johnson	49	1.8	−1.7
Majority		460	17.3	−19.2
Turnout		2,664		
Conservative hold		Swing		

=== Miles Platting ===
Miles Platting
Party	Candidate	Votes	%	±%
Labour	E. V. Hughes*	820	56.8	+4.6
Conservative	G. Fildes	623	43.2	−1.8
Majority		197	13.6	+6.4
Turnout		1,443		
Labour hold		Swing		

=== Moss Side East ===
Moss Side East
Party	Candidate	Votes	%	±%
Labour	A. J. Bateman*	1,275	55.2	+7.7
Conservative	S. Mottram	1,036	44.8	−1.4
Majority		239	10.4	+9.1
Turnout		2,311		
Labour hold		Swing		

=== Moss Side West ===
Moss Side West
Party	Candidate	Votes	%	±%
Conservative	A. H. Burlin	1,804	58.6	+0.7
Labour	R. E. Talbot	1,272	41.4	+7.5
Majority		532	17.2	−6.8
Turnout		3,076		
Conservative hold		Swing		

=== Moston ===
Moston
Party	Candidate	Votes	%	±%
Conservative	A. Wray*	2,644	55.2	+3.7
Labour	J. I. Owen	2,149	44.8	−3.7
Majority		495	10.4	+7.4
Turnout		4,793		
Conservative hold		Swing		

=== New Cross ===
New Cross
Party	Candidate	Votes	%	±%
Labour	E. Crank*	970	74.8	+2.6
Conservative	F. K. Miles	326	25.2	−2.6
Majority		644	49.6	+5.2
Turnout		1,296		
Labour hold		Swing		

=== Newton Heath ===
Newton Heath
Party	Candidate	Votes	%	±%
Labour	R. B. Prain	1,523	59.5	+6.6
Conservative	K. E. Goulding	934	36.5	−5.6
Communist	J. B. Cross	101	4.0	−1.0
Majority		589	23.0	+12.2
Turnout		2,558		
Labour hold		Swing		

=== Northenden ===
Northenden
Party	Candidate	Votes	%	±%
Conservative	J. T. Rollins	2,575	43.9	−2.3
Labour	F. Firth*	2,365	40.3	+5.3
Liberal	J. E. Hargreaves	931	15.8	−2.0
Majority		210	3.6	−6.6
Turnout		5,871		
Conservative gain from Labour		Swing		

=== Old Moat ===
Old Moat
Party	Candidate	Votes	%	±%
Conservative	D. G. Massey*	1,921	49.6	+0.2
Labour	K. Roberts	1,480	38.2	+11.3
Liberal	A. Burns	473	12.2	−15.7
Majority		441	11.4	−7.9
Turnout		3,874		
Conservative hold		Swing		

=== Openshaw ===
Openshaw
Party	Candidate	Votes	%	±%
Labour	T. O. Hamnett*	1,937	65.0	+3.1
Conservative	E. Eccles	970	32.5	−6.4
Communist	H. Holland	74	2.5	−2.5
Majority		967	32.5	+16.4
Turnout		2,981		
Labour hold		Swing		

=== Rusholme ===
Rusholme
Party	Candidate	Votes	%	±%
Conservative	F. W. Harrison*	1,997	70.9	+8.8
Labour	A. E. Jones	821	29.1	+7.2
Majority		1,176	41.8	+1.6
Turnout		2,818		
Conservative hold		Swing		

=== St. George's ===
St. George's
Party	Candidate	Votes	%	±%
Labour	K. Collis*	451	72.5	+9.3
Conservative	A. V. Cookson	171	27.5	−9.3
Majority		280	45.0	+18.6
Turnout		622		
Labour hold		Swing		

=== St. Luke's ===
St. Luke's
Party	Candidate	Votes	%	±%
Labour	D. A. Warby*	916	68.1	+3.7
Conservative	M. Pierce	366	27.2	−1.6
Communist	W. Cross	63	4.7	−2.1
Majority		550	40.9	+5.3
Turnout		1,345		
Labour hold		Swing		

=== St. Mark's ===
St. Mark's
Party	Candidate	Votes	%	±%
Labour	J. T. Morgan	1,468	67.1	+3.0
Conservative	A. E. Welsby	451	20.6	−15.3
Independent	R. C. Allison	269	12.3	N/A
Majority		1,017	46.5	+18.3
Turnout		2,188		
Labour hold		Swing		

=== St. Peter's ===
St. Peter's
Party	Candidate	Votes	%	±%
Conservative	T. Baron*	720	71.0	−11.1
Labour	P. T. Taylor	294	29.0	+11.1
Majority		426	42.0	−22.2
Turnout		1,014		
Conservative hold		Swing		

=== Withington ===
Withington
Party	Candidate	Votes	%	±%
Conservative	E. R. Coker*	2,150	47.8	−0.8
Liberal	J. S. Alldridge	1,701	37.8	−2.1
Labour	A. A. Smith	645	14.4	+2.9
Majority		449	10.0	+1.3
Turnout		4,496		
Conservative hold		Swing		

=== Woodhouse Park ===
Woodhouse Park
Party	Candidate	Votes	%	±%
Labour	C. H. Hall*	2,134	64.5	+5.4
Conservative	M. S. Burgoyne	1,008	30.5	+0.9
Communist	E. Holt	168	5.0	+2.9
Majority		1,126	34.0	+4.5
Turnout		3,310		
Labour hold		Swing		

== Aldermanic election ==
=== Aldermanic election, 2 November 1966 ===
Caused by the resignation on 25 October 1966 of Alderman Robert Moss (Labour, elected as an alderman by the council on 7 May 1947).

In his place, Councillor Dr. Patrick Buckley (Conservative, Moss Side West, elected 12 May 1955; previously 1947-54) was elected as an alderman by the council on 2 November 1966.

Party	Alderman	Ward	Term expires
Conservative	Dr. Patrick Buckley	Gorton North	1970

=== Aldermanic election, 7 December 1966 ===
Caused by the resignation on 2 November 1966 of Alderman Mary Latchford Kingsmill Jones (Conservative, elected as an alderman by the council on 27 July 1938).

In her place, Councillor Gerard Fitzsimons (Conservative, Chorlton-cum-Hardy, elected 10 March 1949) was elected as an alderman by the council on 7 December 1966.

Party	Alderman	Ward	Term expires
Conservative	Gerard Fitzsimons	Benchill	1967

=== Aldermanic election, 3 May 1967 ===
Caused by the resignation on 5 April 1967 of Alderman Bernard McManus (Liberal, elected as an alderman by the council on 5 April 1944).

In his place, Councillor Neil Westbrook (Conservative, St. Peter's, elected 12 May 1949) was elected as an alderman by the council on 3 May 1967.

Party	Alderman	Ward	Term expires
Conservative	Neil Westbrook	Openshaw	1970

== By-elections between 1966 and 1967 ==
=== Levenshulme, 23 June 1966 ===
Caused by the election as an alderman of Councillor Arnold Fieldhouse (Conservative, Levenshulme, elected 1 November 1946) on 4 May 1966, following the resignation on 25 April 1966 of Alderman Eveline Hill (Conservative, elected as an alderman by the council on 4 September 1957).

Levenshulme
Party	Candidate	Votes	%	±%
Conservative	J. K. Barber	1,901	67.8	+5.9
Labour	H. N. Ebrey	904	32.2	−5.9
Majority		997	35.6	+11.8
Turnout		2,805		
Conservative hold		Swing		

=== Chorlton-cum-Hardy, 9 March 1967 ===
Caused by the election as an alderman of Councillor Gerard Fitzsimons (Conservative, Chorlton-cum-Hardy, elected 10 March 1949) on 7 December 1966, following the resignation on 2 November 1966 of Alderman Mary Latchford Kingsmill Jones (Conservative, elected as an alderman by the council on 27 July 1938).

Chorlton-cum-Hardy
Party	Candidate	Votes	%	±%
Conservative	A. D. Ashley	3,111	66.1	+3.1
Liberal	F. E. Hartley	802	17.0	+0.7
Labour	S. V. Shaw	794	16.9	−3.8
Majority		2,309	49.1	+6.8
Turnout		4,707		
Conservative hold		Swing		
