= 1955 Manchester City Council election =

Local election in Manchester, England

- 12 May 1955

38 of 152 seats to Manchester City Council 77 seats needed for a majority
	First party	Second party	Third party
Party	Labour	Conservative	Liberal
Last election	28 seats, 53.8%	15 seats, 44.3%	0 seats, 1.7%
Seats before	89	59	4
Seats won	20	18	0
Seats after	85	63	4
Seat change	▼4	▲4	Steady
Popular vote	88,311	95,234	2,901
Percentage	47.2%	50.8%	1.5%
Swing	▼6.6%	▲6.5%	▼0.2%
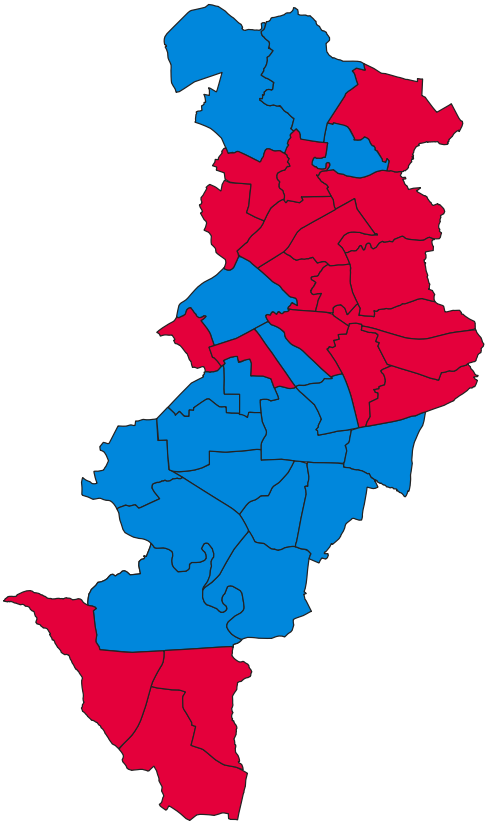
- Map of results of 1955 election
Leader of the Council before election
Labour
Leader of the Council after election
Labour

Elections to Manchester City Council were held on Thursday, 12 May 1955. One third of the councillors seats were up for election, with each successful candidate to serve a three-year term of office. The Labour Party retained overall control of the council.

== Election result ==
Party	Votes		Seats			Full Council	
Labour Party	88,311 (47.2%)	▼6.6	20 (52.6%)	20 / 38	▼4	85 (55.9%)	85 / 152
Conservative Party	95,234 (50.8%)	▲6.5	18 (47.4%)	18 / 38	▲4	63 (41.4%)	63 / 152
Liberal Party	2,901 (1.5%)	▼0.2	0 (0.0%)	0 / 38	Steady	4 (2.6%)	4 / 152
Communist	848 (0.5%)	▲0.2	0 (0.0%)	0 / 38	Steady	0 (0.0%)	0 / 152

=== Full council ===
↓
85	4	63

=== Aldermen ===
↓
19	4	15

=== Councillors ===
↓
66	48

== Ward results ==
=== Alexandra Park ===
Alexandra Park
Party	Candidate	Votes	%	±%
Conservative	L. Bailey*	4,306	81.1	+7.0
Labour	C. E. Bedgood	1,003	18.9	−7.0
Majority		3,303	62.2	+14.0
Turnout		5,309		
Conservative hold		Swing		

=== All Saints' ===
All Saints'
Party	Candidate	Votes	%	±%
Labour	A. Littlemore*	2,368	60.0	−3.0
Conservative	W. J. Geddes	1,581	40.0	+3.0
Majority		787	20.0	−6.0
Turnout		3,949		
Labour hold		Swing		

=== Ardwick ===
Ardwick
Party	Candidate	Votes	%	±%
Labour	W. M. Parkinson*	2,844	62.6	+4.0
Conservative	L. Hogg	1,701	37.4	−4.0
Majority		1,143	25.2	+8.0
Turnout		4,545		
Labour hold		Swing		

=== Baguley ===
Baguley
Party	Candidate	Votes	%	±%
Labour	H. Jenkins*	3,193	53.9	−2.7
Conservative	H. T. Fairclough	2,729	46.1	+1.7
Majority		464	7.8	−2.8
Turnout		5,922		
Labour hold		Swing		

=== Barlow Moor ===
Barlow Moor
Party	Candidate	Votes	%	±%
Conservative	W. J. Pegge*	2,483	69.7	+8.0
Labour	E. Wood	1,079	30.3	−8.0
Majority		1,404	39.4	+16.0
Turnout		3,562		
Conservative hold		Swing		

=== Benchill ===
Benchill
Party	Candidate	Votes	%	±%
Labour	H. Lloyd*	2,606	51.6	−5.6
Conservative	J. H. Prince	2,304	45.6	+5.1
Communist	G. Taylor	142	2.8	+0.5
Majority		302	6.0	−10.7
Turnout		5,052		
Labour hold		Swing		

=== Beswick ===
Beswick
Party	Candidate	Votes	%	±%
Labour	W. Winstanley*	3,202	74.1	−4.1
Conservative	J. Vernon	1,119	25.9	+4.1
Majority		2,083	48.2	−8.2
Turnout		4,321		
Labour hold		Swing		

=== Blackley ===
Blackley
Party	Candidate	Votes	%	±%
Conservative	J. Hart*	4,546	63.5	+5.2
Labour	W. Lister	2,615	36.5	−5.2
Majority		1,931	27.0	+10.4
Turnout		7,161		
Conservative hold		Swing		

=== Bradford ===
Bradford
Party	Candidate	Votes	%	±%
Labour	T. Lomas*	3,333	67.2	−4.7
Conservative	H. J. Caulfield	1,627	32.8	+4.7
Majority		1,706	34.4	−9.4
Turnout		4,960		
Labour hold		Swing		

=== Burnage ===
Burnage
Party	Candidate	Votes	%	±%
Conservative	G. Lord*	3,743	64.4	+8.2
Labour	M. E. Morley	2,073	35.6	−8.2
Majority		1,670	28.8	+16.4
Turnout		5,816		
Conservative hold		Swing		

=== Cheetham ===
Cheetham
Party	Candidate	Votes	%	±%
Labour	H. Goldstone*	1,928	47.5	−2.7
Liberal	S. Needoff	1,192	29.4	+1.4
Conservative	M. V. Sparks	941	23.1	+1.4
Majority		736	18.1	−4.1
Turnout		4,061		
Labour hold		Swing		

=== Chorlton-cum-Hardy ===
Chorlton-cum-Hardy
Party	Candidate	Votes	%	±%
Conservative	M. Whittaker*	4,287	81.6	+4.3
Labour	N. Selwyn	964	18.4	−4.3
Majority		3,323	63.2	+8.6
Turnout		5,251		
Conservative hold		Swing		

=== Collegiate Church ===
Collegiate Church
Party	Candidate	Votes	%	±%
Labour	B. S. Langton*	2,361	73.4	−2.8
Conservative	E. Walmsley	703	21.9	+2.5
Communist	M. I. Druck	151	4.7	+0.3
Majority		1,658	51.5	−5.3
Turnout		3,215		
Labour hold		Swing		

=== Crumpsall ===
Crumpsall
Party	Candidate	Votes	%	±%
Conservative	S. Tomlinson*	4,270	60.2	+7.1
Labour	M. Tylecote	2,822	39.8	−7.1
Majority		1,448	20.4	+14.2
Turnout		7,092		
Conservative hold		Swing		

=== Didsbury ===
Didsbury
Party	Candidate	Votes	%	±%
Conservative	E. Hill*	3,975	69.3	+6.6
Liberal	E. Noble	1,090	19.0	−3.8
Labour	J. S. Goldstone	672	11.7	−2.8
Majority		2,885	50.3	+10.4
Turnout		5,737		
Conservative hold		Swing		

=== Gorton North ===
Gorton North
Party	Candidate	Votes	%	±%
Labour	F. Lord*	3,856	66.2	−6.8
Conservative	L. Lescure	1,825	31.3	+6.9
Communist	J. Kay	143	2.5	−0.1
Majority		2,031	34.9	−13.7
Turnout		5,824		
Labour hold		Swing		

=== Gorton South ===
Gorton South
Party	Candidate	Votes	%	±%
Labour	E. A. Yarwood*	2,234	51.8	−17.5
Conservative	D. S. Watt	2,077	48.2	+17.5
Majority		157	3.6	−35.0
Turnout		4,311		
Labour hold		Swing		

=== Harpurhey ===
Harpurhey
Party	Candidate	Votes	%	±%
Labour	H. P. J. Hinderer*	2,787	53.8	+2.5
Conservative	L. J. Naden	2,393	46.2	−2.5
Majority		394	7.6	+5.0
Turnout		5,180		
Labour hold		Swing		

=== Hugh Oldham ===
Hugh Oldham
Party	Candidate	Votes	%	±%
Labour	A. Donovan*	2,337	71.2	−5.6
Conservative	J. Doherty	795	23.2	+1.0
Communist	F. Farrell	152	4.6	N/A
Majority		1,542	47.0	−6.6
Turnout		3,284		
Labour hold		Swing		

=== Levenshulme ===
Levenshulme
Party	Candidate	Votes	%	±%
Conservative	J. Bowes*	3,578	72.7	+19.5
Labour	S. Carter	1,346	27.3	−5.1
Majority		2,232	45.4	+24.6
Turnout		4,924		
Conservative hold		Swing		

=== Lightbowne ===
Lightbowne
Party	Candidate	Votes	%	±%
Conservative	J. Chatterton	3,665	49.8	+1.4
Labour	R. Malcolm*	3,080	41.8	−2.4
Liberal	F. N. Wedlock	619	8.4	+1.0
Majority		585	8.0	+3.8
Turnout		7,364		
Conservative gain from Labour		Swing		

=== Longsight ===
Longsight
Party	Candidate	Votes	%	±%
Conservative	J. G. Hopkins*	3,048	64.2	+6.8
Labour	J. Davis	1,696	35.8	−6.8
Majority		1,352	28.4	+13.6
Turnout		4,744		
Conservative hold		Swing		

=== Miles Platting ===
Miles Platting
Party	Candidate	Votes	%	±%
Labour	A. Stevenson*	2,179	60.4	−8.0
Conservative	A. Gilbert	1,426	39.6	+8.0
Majority		753	20.8	−16.0
Turnout		3,605		
Labour hold		Swing		

=== Moss Side East ===
Moss Side East
Party	Candidate	Votes	%	±%
Conservative	W. R. Swan*	2,604	52.8	+13.1
Labour	W. A. Downward*	2,222	45.1	−15.1
Communist	L. B. Johnson	106	2.1	N/A
Majority		382	7.7	
Turnout		4,932		
Conservative gain from Labour		Swing		

=== Moss Side West ===
Moss Side West
Party	Candidate	Votes	%	±%
Conservative	P. Buckley	3,072	60.8	+11.3
Labour	E. V. Hughes	1,979	39.2	−11.4
Majority		1,093	21.6	
Turnout		5,051		
Conservative gain from Labour		Swing		

=== Moston ===
Moston
Party	Candidate	Votes	%	±%
Labour	C. Lamb*	3,703	52.7	−2.6
Conservative	M. Dunn	3,326	47.3	+2.6
Majority		377	5.4	−5.2
Turnout		7,029		
Labour hold		Swing		

=== New Cross ===
New Cross
Party	Candidate	Votes	%	±%
Labour	C. Blackwell*	1,957	65.5	−8.8
Conservative	K. Corless	1,029	34.5	+8.8
Majority		928	31.0	−17.6
Turnout		2,986		
Labour hold		Swing		

=== Newton Heath ===
Newton Heath
Party	Candidate	Votes	%	±%
Labour	A. Logan*	2,732	63.8	−4.3
Conservative	J. E. Anderson	1,550	36.2	+4.3
Majority		1,182	27.6	−8.6
Turnout		4,282		
Labour hold		Swing		

=== Northenden ===
Northenden
Party	Candidate	Votes	%	±%
Conservative	A. Williamson	3,739	51.9	+1.6
Labour	N. Morris	3,467	48.1	−1.6
Majority		272	3.8	+3.2
Turnout		7,206		
Conservative hold		Swing		

=== Old Moat ===
Old Moat
Party	Candidate	Votes	%	±%
Conservative	H. P. Humphris*	2,980	69.8	+6.5
Labour	G. Halstead	1,287	30.2	−6.5
Majority		1,693	39.6	+13.0
Turnout		4,267		
Conservative hold		Swing		

=== Openshaw ===
Openshaw
Party	Candidate	Votes	%	±%
Labour	L. Thomas*	3,743	67.7	−4.4
Conservative	E. Fitzsimons	1,628	29.5	+4.2
Communist	J. Hodgson	154	2.8	+0.2
Majority		2,115	38.2	−8.6
Turnout		5,525		
Labour hold		Swing		

=== Rusholme ===
Rusholme
Party	Candidate	Votes	%	±%
Conservative	H. Stockdale*	3,547	72.0	+1.7
Labour	A. H. Green	1,377	28.0	−1.7
Majority		2,170	44.0	+3.4
Turnout		4,924		
Conservative hold		Swing		

=== St. George's ===
St. George's
Party	Candidate	Votes	%	±%
Labour	R. E. Thomas*	2,554	63.8	−7.5
Conservative	J. Livesey	1,449	36.2	+7.5
Majority		1,105	27.6	−15.0
Turnout		4,003		
Labour hold		Swing		

=== St. Luke's ===
St. Luke's
Party	Candidate	Votes	%	±%
Conservative	M. J. Holberry	2,398	50.4	+3.8
Labour	W. Massey*	2,358	49.6	−3.8
Majority		40	0.8	
Turnout		4,756		
Conservative gain from Labour		Swing		

=== St. Mark's ===
St. Mark's
Party	Candidate	Votes	%	±%
Labour	W. Shaw*	3,408	66.8	−0.4
Conservative	W. H. Fleetwood	1,691	33.2	+0.6
Majority		1,717	33.6	−0.1
Turnout		5,099		
Labour hold		Swing		

=== St. Peter's ===
St. Peter's
Party	Candidate	Votes	%	±%
Conservative	N. G. Westbrook*	1,823	75.2	+5.4
Labour	E. H. Jessop	602	24.8	−5.4
Majority		1,221	50.4	+10.8
Turnout		2,425		
Conservative hold		Swing		

=== Withington ===
Withington
Party	Candidate	Votes	%	±%
Conservative	J. McGrath*	3,415	83.2	+2.3
Labour	H. Jenkins	692	16.8	−2.3
Majority		2,723	66.4	+4.6
Turnout		4,107		
Conservative hold		Swing		

=== Woodhouse Park ===
Woodhouse Park
Party	Candidate	Votes	%	±%
Labour	W. Smith*	3,652	66.2	−5.8
Conservative	L. V. Roy	1,861	33.8	+4.8
Majority		1,791	32.4	−9.5
Turnout		5,513		
Labour hold		Swing		

== Aldermanic elections ==
=== Aldermanic election, 6 July 1955 ===
Caused by the resignation on 8 June 1955 of Alderman Frank Gregson (Labour, elected as an alderman by the council on 4 December 1946).

In his place, Councillor Hannah Baldwin (Labour, Beswick, elected 21 January 1937) was elected as an alderman by the council on 6 July 1955.

Party	Alderman	Ward	Term expires
Labour	Hannah Baldwin	Withington	1961

=== Aldermanic elections, 4 January 1956 ===
Caused by the death on 15 December 1955 of Alderman Sir Miles Mitchell (Liberal, elected as an alderman by the council on 24 June 1927).

In his place, Councillor Elizabeth Yarwood (Labour, Gorton South, elected 12 May 1949; previously 1938-47) was elected as an alderman by the council on 4 January 1956.

Party	Alderman	Ward	Term expires
Labour	Elizabeth Yarwood	Hugh Oldham	1958

Caused by the death on 22 December 1955 of Alderman Tom Larrad (Labour, elected as an alderman by the council on 5 September 1951).

In his place, Councillor Tom Nally (Labour, Openshaw, elected 1 November 1937) was elected as an alderman by the council on 4 January 1956.

Party	Alderman	Ward	Term expires
Labour	Tom Nally	Levenshulme	1958

=== Aldermanic election, 1 February 1956 ===
Caused by the resignation on 24 January 1956 of Alderman John Edward Pheasey (Independent Conservative, elected as an alderman by the council on 29 April 1953).

In his place, Councillor Robert Rodgers (Conservative, Rusholme, elected 30 January 1936) was elected as an alderman by the council on 1 February 1956.

Party	Alderman	Ward	Term expires
Conservative	Robert Rodgers	Barlow Moor	1958

=== Aldermanic election, 15 February 1956 ===
Caused by the death on 30 January 1956 of Alderman Elijah John Hart (Labour, elected as an alderman by the council on 30 October 1935).

In his place, Councillor Mary Knight (Labour, New Cross, elected 1 November 1938) was elected as an alderman by the council on 15 February 1956.

Party	Alderman	Ward	Term expires
Labour	Mary Knight	New Cross	1961

=== Aldermanic election, 4 April 1956 ===
Caused by the death on 7 March 1956 of Alderman Harry Thorneycroft (Labour, elected as an alderman by the council on 9 November 1939).

In his place, Councillor William Winstanley (Labour, Beswick, elected 6 December 1939) was elected as an alderman by the council on 4 April 1956.

Party	Alderman	Ward	Term expires
Labour	William Winstanley	Bradford	1961

== By-elections between 1955 and 1956 ==
=== By-elections, 22 September 1955 ===
Three by-elections were held on 22 September 1955 to fill vacancies which had arisen in the city council.

==== Beswick ====
Caused by the election as an alderman of Councillor Hannah Baldwin (Labour, Beswick, elected 21 January 1937) on 30 July 1952, following the resignation on 8 June 1955 of Alderman Frank Gregson (Labour, elected as an alderman by the council on 4 December 1946).

Beswick
Party	Candidate	Votes	%	±%
Labour	J. G. Birtles	2,538	71.5	−2.6
Conservative	J. Carson	1,012	28.5	+2.6
Majority		1,526	43.0	−5.2
Turnout		3,550		
Labour hold		Swing		

==== Newton Heath ====
Caused by the resignation of Councillor John Bates (Labour, Newton Heath, elected 7 May 1953) on 18 May 1955.

Newton Heath
Party	Candidate	Votes	%	±%
Labour	W. Lister	2,057	64.3	+0.5
Conservative	J. E. Anderson	1,142	35.7	−0.5
Majority		915	28.6	+1.0
Turnout		3,199		
Labour hold		Swing		

==== Old Moat ====
Caused by the resignation of Councillor W. R. Swan (Conservative, Old Moat, elected 10 May 1951) on 13 May 1955.

Old Moat
Party	Candidate	Votes	%	±%
Conservative	C. A. Earley	1,971	58.7	−11.1
Labour	G. Halstead	887	26.4	−3.8
Liberal	R. H. Hargreaves	502	14.9	N/A
Majority		1,084	32.3	−7.3
Turnout		3,360		
Conservative hold		Swing		

=== Gorton South, 22 March 1956 ===
Caused by the election as an alderman of Councillor Elizabeth Yarwood (Labour, Gorton South, elected 12 May 1949; previously 1938-47) on 4 January 1956, following the death on 15 December 1955 of Alderman Sir Miles Mitchell (Liberal, elected as an alderman by the council on 24 June 1927).

Gorton South
Party	Candidate	Votes	%	±%
Labour	H. J. Batson	1,775	63.1	+11.3
Conservative	D. C. Walls	1,037	36.9	−11.3
Majority		738	26.2	+22.6
Turnout		2,812		
Labour hold		Swing		
