= Nellie Beer =

Nellie Beer, OBE, JP (née Robinson; 22 April 1900 – 17 September 1988), was a Conservative member of Manchester City Council from 1937 to 1972. She was Lord Mayor of Manchester from 1966 to 1967.

Her father died when she was three, and at 14 she worked in a blouse factory for 4 shillings a week. She went to night school and became a dress maker in a large Manchester store. She joined the Conservative Party during the 1914-8 war. She attended secondary school in Ardwick. In 1927 she married Robert Beer to whom she bore a daughter. She stood for Parliament in Manchester Ardwick unsuccessfully in 1945. She was first Chairman of the Manchester Children's committee from 1948 to 1952 and continued as an active member of the committee. In June 1957 she was appointed an OBE in the Queen's Birthday Honours. She was awarded the title of Honorary Freeman of Manchester in 1974.

Honorary titles
Preceded by Bernard Sydney Langton	Lord Mayor of Manchester; 1966–1967	Succeeded by Elizabeth Yarwood
