= Frederick Balcombe =

British politician (1911–2000)

Frederick James Balcombe, JP {17 December 1911 - 1 July 2000} was Lord Mayor of Manchester, England, 1974–5, the first Lord Mayor of the Metropolitan District of Manchester.

He was born in Forest Gate, the son of Sid Balcombe. His father owned a firm of loss adjusters, and he went to Manchester in 1928 to run an office of the firm there. During World War II, he served as an officer in the RAF in North Africa. He was a city councillor representing the Labour Party from 1958 to 1982.

A strong campaigner for the rights of Soviet Jews, he boycotted a concert in 1971 given by the Leningrad Symphony Orchestra. However, as Lord Mayor he visited Leningrad to speak to officials there about their treatment of Jews.

Honorary titles
Preceded by Ken Collis	Lord Mayor of Manchester; 1974–1975	Succeeded by Kathleen Ollerenshaw
