= Openshaw (ward) =

- Ward
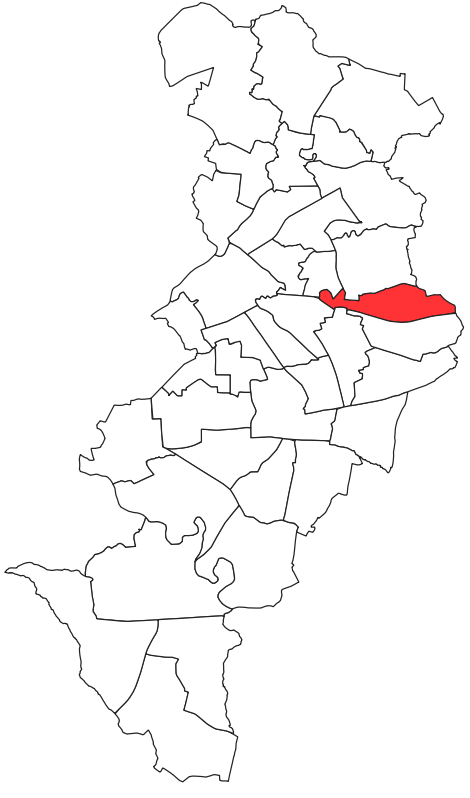
- Openshaw ward (1954) within Manchester

- Coat of arms
- Country: United Kingdom
- Constituent country: England
- Region: North West England
- County borough: Manchester
- Created: November 1890
- Named for: Openshaw

Government
  - Type: Unicameral
  - Body: Manchester City Council
- UK Parliamentary Constituency: Manchester Openshaw

Openshaw was an electoral division of Manchester City Council which was represented from 1890 until 1971. It covered the Openshaw area of East Manchester.

== Overview ==
Openshaw ward was created in 1890, as a result of the Manchester Extension Scheme 1890, which transferred the townships of Blackley, Crumpsall, Moston, Newton, Openshaw, and parts of Gorton to the Manchester corporation. Initially, it covered the whole of the former Openshaw township. City-wide boundary revisions in 1919 transferred the easternmost part of the ward to the Gorton North ward. In 1950, the ward's southern boundary became the Great Central Main Line. The ward was abolished in 1971 and its remaining area was transferred to the Bradford ward.

From its creation until 1918, the ward formed part of the Gorton Parliamentary constituency. From 1918 until 1955, it was part of the Manchester Gorton Parliamentary constituency. From 1955 until its abolition, it was part of the Manchester Openshaw Parliamentary constituency.

== Councillors ==
| Election | Councillor | Councillor | Councillor |
|---|---|---|---|
| 1890 | S. J. Erwin (Lib) | J. Battersby (Con) | J. H. Crosfield (Lib) |
| November 1890 | S. J. Erwin (Lib) | J. Battersby (Con) | J. Robinson (Con) |
| August 1891 | J. Saxon (Lib) | J. Battersby (Con) | J. Robinson (Con) |
| 1891 | J. Saxon (Lib) | J. Battersby (Con) | J. Robinson (Con) |
| 1892 | J. Saxon (Lib) | D. Taylor (Con) | J. Robinson (Con) |
| 1893 | J. Saxon (Lib) | D. Taylor (Con) | J. Robinson (Con) |
| 1894 | J. Saxon (Lib) | D. Taylor (Con) | J. Butler (ILP) |
| 1895 | J. Saxon (Lib) | D. Taylor (Con) | J. Butler (ILP) |
| 1896 | J. Saxon (Lib) | D. Taylor (Con) | J. Butler (ILP) |
| 1897 | J. Saxon (Lib) | D. Taylor (Con) | J. Pollitt (Con) |
| May 1898 | G. Needham (Con) | D. Taylor (Con) | J. Pollitt (Con) |
| 1898 | G. Needham (Con) | D. Taylor (Con) | J. Pollitt (Con) |
| 1899 | J. Johnson (Con) | D. Taylor (Con) | J. Pollitt (Con) |
| 1900 | J. Johnson (Con) | D. Taylor (Con) | J. Pollitt (Con) |
| 1901 | J. Johnson (Con) | D. Taylor (Con) | J. Pollitt (Con) |
| 1902 | E. J. Hart (Lab) | D. Taylor (Con) | J. Pollitt (Con) |
| 1903 | E. J. Hart (Lab) | D. Taylor (Con) | T. Cook (Lab) |
| 1904 | E. J. Hart (Lab) | J. B. Williams (Lab) | T. Cook (Lab) |
| 1905 | E. J. Hart (Lab) | J. B. Williams (Lab) | T. Cook (Lab) |
| 1906 | E. J. Hart (Lab) | J. B. Williams (Lab) | T. Cook (Lab) |
| 1907 | E. J. Hart (Lab) | J. Caminada (Ind) | T. Cook (Lab) |
| 1908 | F. S. Fletcher (Ind) | J. Caminada (Ind) | T. Cook (Lab) |
| 1909 | F. S. Fletcher (Ind) | J. Caminada (Ind) | T. Cook (Lab) |
| 1910 | F. S. Fletcher (Ind) | G. F. Titt (Lab) | T. Cook (Lab) |
| 1911 | H. D. Judson (Con) | G. F. Titt (Lab) | T. Cook (Lab) |
| 1912 | H. D. Judson (Con) | G. F. Titt (Lab) | T. Cook (Lab) |
| 1913 | H. D. Judson (Con) | G. F. Titt (Lab) | T. Cook (Lab) |
| 1914 | H. D. Judson (Con) | G. F. Titt (Lab) | T. Cook (Lab) |
| November 1918 | H. D. Judson (Con) | G. F. Titt (Lab) | T. Cook (Ind. Lab) |
| January 1919 | H. D. Judson (Con) | G. F. Titt (Lab) | J. Toole (Lab) |
| 1919 | H. D. Judson (Con) | G. F. Titt (Lab) | J. Toole (Lab) |
| 1920 | H. D. Judson (Con) | G. F. Titt (Lab) | J. Toole (Lab) |
| 1921 | H. D. Judson (Con) | G. F. Titt (Lab) | J. Toole (Lab) |
| 1922 | H. D. Judson (Con) | G. F. Titt (Lab) | J. Toole (Lab) |
| 1923 | H. D. Judson (Con) | G. F. Titt (Lab) | J. Toole (Lab) |
| 1924 | J. W. Aveson (Lab) | G. F. Titt (Lab) | J. Toole (Lab) |
| 1925 | J. W. Aveson (Lab) | G. F. Titt (Lab) | J. Toole (Lab) |
| 1926 | J. W. Aveson (Lab) | G. F. Titt (Lab) | J. Toole (Lab) |
| 1927 | J. W. Aveson (Lab) | G. F. Titt (Lab) | J. Toole (Lab) |
| July 1928 | J. W. Aveson (Lab) | W. H. Oldfield (Lab) | J. Toole (Lab) |
| 1928 | J. W. Aveson (Lab) | W. H. Oldfield (Lab) | J. Toole (Lab) |
| 1929 | J. W. Aveson (Lab) | W. H. Oldfield (Lab) | J. Toole (Lab) |
| 1930 | R. Moss (Lab) | W. H. Oldfield (Lab) | J. Toole (Lab) |
| 1931 | R. Moss (Lab) | W. H. Oldfield (Lab) | J. Toole (Lab) |
| 1932 | R. Moss (Lab) | W. H. Oldfield (Lab) | J. Toole (Lab) |
| 1933 | R. Moss (Lab) | W. H. Oldfield (Lab) | J. Toole (Lab) |
| 1934 | R. Moss (Lab) | W. H. Oldfield (Lab) | J. Toole (Lab) |
| March 1935 | R. Moss (Lab) | W. H. Oldfield (Lab) | J. Casson (Lab) |
| 1935 | R. Moss (Lab) | W. H. Oldfield (Lab) | J. Casson (Lab) |
| 1936 | R. Moss (Lab) | W. H. Oldfield (Lab) | J. Casson (Lab) |
| 1937 | R. Moss (Lab) | W. H. Oldfield (Lab) | T. Nally (Lab) |
| 1938 | R. Moss (Lab) | W. H. Oldfield (Lab) | T. Nally (Lab) |
| 1945 | R. Moss (Lab) | W. H. Oldfield (Lab) | T. Nally (Lab) |
| December 1945 | L. Thomas (Lab) | R. Moss (Lab) | T. Nally (Lab) |
| 1946 | L. Thomas (Lab) | R. Moss (Lab) | T. Nally (Lab) |
| 1947 | L. Thomas (Lab) | S. Jolly (Lab) | T. Nally (Lab) |
| 1949 | L. Thomas (Lab) | S. Jolly (Lab) | T. Nally (Lab) |
| 1950 | L. Thomas (Lab) | S. Jolly (Lab) | T. Nally (Lab) |
| 1951 | L. Thomas (Lab) | S. Jolly (Lab) | T. Nally (Lab) |
| 1952 | L. Thomas (Lab) | S. Jolly (Lab) | T. Nally (Lab) |
| 1953 | L. Thomas (Lab) | S. Jolly (Lab) | T. Nally (Lab) |
| 1954 | L. Thomas (Lab) | S. Jolly (Lab) | T. Nally (Lab) |
| 1955 | L. Thomas (Lab) | S. Jolly (Lab) | T. Nally (Lab) |
| 1956 | L. Thomas (Lab) | S. Jolly (Lab) | M. E. Morley (Lab) |
| 1957 | L. Thomas (Lab) | S. Jolly (Lab) | M. E. Morley (Lab) |
| 1958 | L. Thomas (Lab) | S. Jolly (Lab) | M. E. Morley (Lab) |
| 1959 | L. Thomas (Lab) | S. Jolly (Lab) | M. E. Morley (Lab) |
| 1960 | L. Thomas (Lab) | S. Jolly (Lab) | M. E. Morley (Lab) |
| 1961 | L. Thomas (Lab) | S. Jolly (Lab) | M. E. Morley (Lab) |
| 1962 | L. Thomas (Lab) | S. Jolly (Lab) | M. E. Morley (Lab) |
| 1963 | L. Thomas (Lab) | S. Jolly (Lab) | M. E. Morley (Lab) |
| November 1963 | P. J. Donoghue (Lab) | S. Jolly (Lab) | T. O. Hamnett (Lab) |
| 1964 | P. J. Donoghue (Lab) | S. Jolly (Lab) | T. O. Hamnett (Lab) |
| 1965 | P. J. Donoghue (Lab) | T. O. Hamnett (Lab) | J. Gilmore (Lab) |
| 1966 | P. J. Donoghue (Lab) | T. O. Hamnett (Lab) | J. Gilmore (Lab) |
| 1967 | P. J. Donoghue (Lab) | T. O. Hamnett (Lab) | J. Gilmore (Lab) |
| 1968 | P. J. Donoghue (Lab) | T. O. Hamnett (Lab) | J. Gilmore (Lab) |
| February 1969 | E. Grant (Lab) | T. O. Hamnett (Lab) | J. Gilmore (Lab) |
| 1969 | E. Grant (Lab) | T. O. Hamnett (Lab) | J. Gilmore (Lab) |
| 1970 | E. Grant (Lab) | T. O. Hamnett (Lab) | J. Gilmore (Lab) |

== Elections ==
=== Elections in 1890s ===
==== November 1890 ====
1890 (3 vacancies)
| Party | Candidate | Votes | % | ±% |
|---|---|---|---|---|
| Liberal | S. J. Erwin | 1,594 | 53.5 | |
| Conservative | J. Battersby | 1,557 | 52.2 | |
| Liberal | J. H. Crosfield | 1,512 | 50.7 | |
| Conservative | J. Robinson | 1,499 | 49.9 | |
| Liberal | J. Brierley | 1,401 | 47.0 | |
| Conservative | W. Charlton | 1,381 | 46.3 | |
| Majority | | 13 | 0.8 | |
| Turnout | | 2,981 | | |
| Liberal win (new seat) | | | | |
| Conservative win (new seat) | | | | |
| Liberal win (new seat) | | | | |

==== November 1890 (by-election) ====
By-election: 30 November 1890
| Party | Candidate | Votes | % | ±% |
|---|---|---|---|---|
| Conservative | J. Robinson | 1,605 | 53.8 | +1.6 |
| Liberal | J. Brierley | 1,377 | 46.2 | −7.3 |
| Majority | | 228 | 7.6 | |
| Turnout | | 2,982 | | |
| Conservative gain from Liberal | | Swing | | |

==== August 1891 (by-election) ====
By-election: 6 August 1891
| Party | Candidate | Votes | % | ±% |
|---|---|---|---|---|
| Liberal | J. Saxon | 1,351 | 54.3 | +8.1 |
| Conservative | J. Pollitt | 1,135 | 45.7 | −8.1 |
| Majority | | 216 | 8.6 | |
| Turnout | | 2,486 | | |
| Liberal hold | | Swing | | |

==== November 1891 ====
1891
| Party | Candidate | Votes | % | ±% |
|---|---|---|---|---|
| Conservative | J. Robinson* | 1,725 | 56.5 | +4.3 |
| Liberal | J. Ryder | 1,329 | 43.5 | −10.0 |
| Majority | | 396 | 13.0 | |
| Turnout | | 3,054 | | |
| Conservative hold | | Swing | | |

==== November 1892 ====
1892
| Party | Candidate | Votes | % | ±% |
|---|---|---|---|---|
| Conservative | D. Taylor* | uncontested | | |
| Conservative hold | | Swing | | |

==== November 1893 ====
1893
| Party | Candidate | Votes | % | ±% |
|---|---|---|---|---|
| Liberal | J. Saxon* | 1,815 | 62.4 | N/A |
| Conservative | A. Stansfield | 1,093 | 37.6 | N/A |
| Majority | | 722 | 24.8 | N/A |
| Turnout | | 2,908 | | |
| Liberal hold | | Swing | | |

==== November 1894 ====
1894
| Party | Candidate | Votes | % | ±% |
|---|---|---|---|---|
| Ind. Labour Party | J. Butler | 1,464 | 50.4 | N/A |
| Conservative | H. P. Ilderton | 1,442 | 49.6 | +12.0 |
| Majority | | 22 | 0.8 | |
| Turnout | | 2,906 | | |
| Ind. Labour Party gain from Conservative | | Swing | | |

==== November 1895 ====
1895
| Party | Candidate | Votes | % | ±% |
|---|---|---|---|---|
| Conservative | D. Taylor* | 1,526 | 50.6 | +1.0 |
| Liberal | J. Jee | 786 | 26.1 | N/A |
| Ind. Labour Party | E. J. Hart | 705 | 23.4 | −27.0 |
| Majority | | 740 | 24.5 | |
| Turnout | | 3,017 | | |
| Conservative hold | | Swing | | |

==== November 1896 ====
1896
| Party | Candidate | Votes | % | ±% |
|---|---|---|---|---|
| Liberal | J. Saxon* | 1,813 | 65.8 | +39.7 |
| Ind. Labour Party | E. J. Hart | 944 | 34.2 | +10.8 |
| Majority | | 869 | 31.6 | |
| Turnout | | 2,757 | | |
| Liberal hold | | Swing | | |

==== November 1897 ====
1897
| Party | Candidate | Votes | % | ±% |
|---|---|---|---|---|
| Conservative | J. Pollitt | 2,044 | 58.1 | N/A |
| Ind. Labour Party | J. Butler* | 1,473 | 41.9 | +7.7 |
| Majority | | 571 | 16.2 | |
| Turnout | | 2,757 | | |
| Conservative gain from Ind. Labour Party | | Swing | | |

==== May 1898 (by-election) ====
By-election: 20 May 1898
| Party | Candidate | Votes | % | ±% |
|---|---|---|---|---|
| Conservative | G. Needham | 1,058 | 44.5 | −13.6 |
| Ind. Labour Party | W. H. Taylor | 760 | 32.0 | −9.9 |
| Lib-Lab | J. Butler* | 557 | 23.5 | N/A |
| Majority | | 298 | 12.5 | −3.7 |
| Turnout | | 2,375 | | |
| Conservative gain from Liberal | | Swing | | |

==== November 1898 ====
1898
| Party | Candidate | Votes | % | ±% |
|---|---|---|---|---|
| Conservative | D. Taylor* | 1,589 | 60.0 | +1.9 |
| Ind. Labour Party | W. H. Taylor | 1,061 | 40.0 | −1.9 |
| Majority | | 528 | 20.0 | +3.8 |
| Turnout | | 2,650 | | |
| Conservative hold | | Swing | | |

==== November 1899 ====
1899
| Party | Candidate | Votes | % | ±% |
|---|---|---|---|---|
| Conservative | J. Johnson | 1,317 | 59.4 | −0.6 |
| Ind. Labour Party | R. Macdonald | 901 | 40.6 | +0.6 |
| Majority | | 416 | 18.8 | −1.2 |
| Turnout | | 2,218 | | |
| Conservative hold | | Swing | | |

=== Elections in 1900s ===
==== November 1900 ====
1900
| Party | Candidate | Votes | % | ±% |
|---|---|---|---|---|
| Conservative | J. Pollitt* | 1,779 | 60.4 | +1.0 |
| Labour | E. J. Hart | 1,168 | 39.6 | −1.0 |
| Majority | | 611 | 20.8 | +2.0 |
| Turnout | | 2,947 | | |
| Conservative hold | | Swing | | |

==== November 1901 ====
1901
| Party | Candidate | Votes | % | ±% |
|---|---|---|---|---|
| Conservative | D. Taylor* | uncontested | | |
| Conservative hold | | Swing | | |

==== November 1902 ====
1902
| Party | Candidate | Votes | % | ±% |
|---|---|---|---|---|
| Labour | E. J. Hart | 1,607 | 52.7 | N/A |
| Conservative | J. Johnson* | 1,443 | 47.3 | N/A |
| Majority | | 164 | 5.4 | N/A |
| Turnout | | 3,050 | | |
| Labour gain from Conservative | | Swing | | |

==== November 1903 ====
1903
| Party | Candidate | Votes | % | ±% |
|---|---|---|---|---|
| Labour | T. Cook | 1,765 | 60.7 | +8.0 |
| Conservative | J. Pollitt* | 1,142 | 39.3 | −8.0 |
| Majority | | 623 | 21.4 | +16.0 |
| Turnout | | 2,907 | | |
| Labour gain from Conservative | | Swing | | |

==== November 1904 ====
1904
| Party | Candidate | Votes | % | ±% |
|---|---|---|---|---|
| Labour | J. B. Williams | 1,936 | 61.0 | +0.3 |
| Conservative | D. Taylor* | 1,236 | 39.0 | −0.3 |
| Majority | | 700 | 22.0 | +0.6 |
| Turnout | | 3,172 | | |
| Labour gain from Conservative | | Swing | | |

==== November 1905 ====
1905
| Party | Candidate | Votes | % | ±% |
|---|---|---|---|---|
| Labour | E. J. Hart* | uncontested | | |
| Labour hold | | Swing | | |

==== November 1906 ====
1906
| Party | Candidate | Votes | % | ±% |
|---|---|---|---|---|
| Labour | T. Cook* | uncontested | | |
| Labour hold | | Swing | | |

==== November 1907 ====
1907
| Party | Candidate | Votes | % | ±% |
|---|---|---|---|---|
| Independent | J. Caminada | 1,479 | 54.0 | N/A |
| Labour | J. B. Williams* | 1,262 | 46.0 | N/A |
| Majority | | 217 | 8.0 | N/A |
| Turnout | | 2,741 | | |
| Independent gain from Labour | | Swing | | |

==== November 1908 ====
1908
| Party | Candidate | Votes | % | ±% |
|---|---|---|---|---|
| Independent | F. S. Fletcher | 2,189 | 55.1 | +1.1 |
| Labour | E. J. Hart* | 1,787 | 44.9 | −1.1 |
| Majority | | 402 | 10.2 | +2.2 |
| Turnout | | 3,976 | | |
| Independent gain from Labour | | Swing | | |

==== November 1909 ====
1909
| Party | Candidate | Votes | % | ±% |
|---|---|---|---|---|
| Labour | T. Cook* | 1,737 | 55.9 | +11.0 |
| Liberal | H. Marsden | 1,369 | 44.1 | N/A |
| Majority | | 368 | 11.8 | |
| Turnout | | 3,106 | | |
| Labour hold | | Swing | | |

=== Elections in 1910s ===
==== November 1910 ====
1910
| Party | Candidate | Votes | % | ±% |
|---|---|---|---|---|
| Labour | G. F. Titt | 1,482* | 50.0 | −5.9 |
| Independent | J. Caminada* | 1,482 | 50.0 | N/A |
| Majority | | 0 | 0.0 | −11.8 |
| Turnout | | 3,106 | | |
| Labour gain from Independent | | Swing | | |

* Two candidates having received 1,482 votes each, Titt was returned on the Alderman's casting vote

==== November 1911 ====
1911
| Party | Candidate | Votes | % | ±% |
|---|---|---|---|---|
| Conservative | H. D. Judson | 1,754 | 49.7 | N/A |
| Labour | H. H. Laurie | 1,628 | 46.1 | −3.9 |
| British Socialist Party | R. Whitehead | 148 | 4.2 | N/A |
| Majority | | 126 | 3.6 | |
| Turnout | | 3,530 | | |
| Conservative gain from Independent | | Swing | | |

==== November 1912 ====
1912
| Party | Candidate | Votes | % | ±% |
|---|---|---|---|---|
| Labour | T. Cook* | 1,275 | 83.1 | +37.0 |
| British Socialist Party | W. Green | 260 | 16.9 | +12.7 |
| Majority | | 1,015 | 66.2 | |
| Turnout | | 1,535 | | |
| Labour hold | | Swing | | |

==== November 1913 ====
1913
| Party | Candidate | Votes | % | ±% |
|---|---|---|---|---|
| Labour | G. F. Titt* | 1,617 | 50.0 | −33.1 |
| Conservative | D. C. Goodman | 1,433 | 44.3 | N/A |
| British Socialist Party | W. Green | 183 | 5.7 | −11.2 |
| Majority | | 184 | 5.7 | −60.5 |
| Turnout | | 3,233 | | |
| Labour hold | | Swing | | |

==== November 1914 ====
1914
| Party | Candidate | Votes | % | ±% |
|---|---|---|---|---|
| Conservative | H. D. Judson* | uncontested | | |
| Conservative hold | | Swing | | |

==== January 1919 (by-election) ====
By-election: 21 January 1919
| Party | Candidate | Votes | % | ±% |
|---|---|---|---|---|
| Labour | J. Toole | 1,428 | 76.0 | |
| Conservative | C. A. Toyn | 452 | 24.0 | |
| Majority | | 976 | 52.0 | |
| Turnout | | 1,880 | | |
| Labour gain from Independent Labour | | Swing | | |

==== November 1919 ====
1919 (new boundaries)
| Party | Candidate | Votes | % | ±% |
|---|---|---|---|---|
| Labour | J. Toole* | uncontested | | |
| Labour hold | | Swing | | |

=== Elections in 1920s ===
==== November 1920 ====
1920
| Party | Candidate | Votes | % | ±% |
|---|---|---|---|---|
| Labour | G. F. Titt* | 2,073 | 51.5 | N/A |
| Conservative | W. Docker | 1,952 | 48.5 | N/A |
| Majority | | 121 | 3.0 | N/A |
| Turnout | | 4,025 | 36.4 | N/A |
| Labour hold | | Swing | | |

==== November 1921 ====
1921
| Party | Candidate | Votes | % | ±% |
|---|---|---|---|---|
| Conservative | H. D. Judson* | 2,967 | 51.4 | +2.9 |
| Labour | J. Brown | 2,135 | 37.0 | −14.5 |
| Communist | J. Dickson | 666 | 11.5 | N/A |
| Majority | | 832 | 14.4 | |
| Turnout | | 5,498 | 62.5 | +26.1 |
| Conservative hold | | Swing | | |

==== November 1922 ====
1922
| Party | Candidate | Votes | % | ±% |
|---|---|---|---|---|
| Labour | J. Toole* | 2,860 | 57.4 | +20.4 |
| Conservative | D. C. Goodman | 2,126 | 42.6 | −8.8 |
| Majority | | 734 | 14.8 | |
| Turnout | | 4,986 | 53.1 | −9.4 |
| Labour hold | | Swing | | |

==== November 1923 ====
1923
| Party | Candidate | Votes | % | ±% |
|---|---|---|---|---|
| Labour | G. F. Titt* | 2,894 | 57.8 | +0.4 |
| Conservative | A. H. Turner | 2,111 | 42.2 | −0.4 |
| Majority | | 783 | 15.6 | +0.8 |
| Turnout | | 5,005 | | |
| Labour hold | | Swing | | |

==== November 1924 ====
1924
| Party | Candidate | Votes | % | ±% |
|---|---|---|---|---|
| Labour | J. W. Aveson | 3,005 | 54.8 | −3.0 |
| Conservative | H. D. Judson* | 2,474 | 45.2 | +3.0 |
| Majority | | 531 | 9.6 | −6.0 |
| Turnout | | 5,005 | | |
| Labour gain from Conservative | | Swing | | |

==== November 1925 ====
1925
| Party | Candidate | Votes | % | ±% |
|---|---|---|---|---|
| Labour | J. Toole* | uncontested | | |
| Labour hold | | Swing | | |

==== November 1926 ====
1926
| Party | Candidate | Votes | % | ±% |
|---|---|---|---|---|
| Labour | G. F. Titt* | uncontested | | |
| Labour hold | | Swing | | |

==== November 1927 ====
1927
| Party | Candidate | Votes | % | ±% |
|---|---|---|---|---|
| Labour | J. W. Aveson* | uncontested | | |
| Labour hold | | Swing | | |

==== July 1928 (by-election) ====
By-election: 17 July 1928
| Party | Candidate | Votes | % | ±% |
|---|---|---|---|---|
| Labour | W. H. Oldfield | 2,980 | 74.4 | N/A |
| Conservative | R. S. Ireland | 1,024 | 25.6 | N/A |
| Majority | | 1,956 | 48.8 | N/A |
| Turnout | | 4,004 | | |
| Labour hold | | Swing | | |

==== November 1928 ====
1928
| Party | Candidate | Votes | % | ±% |
|---|---|---|---|---|
| Labour | J. Toole* | 4,081 | 72.6 | N/A |
| Conservative | J. Culshaw | 1,389 | 24.7 | N/A |
| Communist | A. Jackson | 127 | 2.3 | N/A |
| Residents | J. F. Gavin | 25 | 0.4 | N/A |
| Majority | | 2,692 | 47.9 | N/A |
| Turnout | | 5,622 | 58.4 | N/A |
| Labour hold | | Swing | | |

==== November 1929 ====
1929
| Party | Candidate | Votes | % | ±% |
|---|---|---|---|---|
| Labour | W. H. Oldfield* | 2,559 | 96.7 | +24.1 |
| Communist | F. J. Bright | 87 | 3.3 | +1.0 |
| Majority | | 2,472 | 93.4 | +45.5 |
| Turnout | | 2,646 | 25.8 | −32.6 |
| Labour hold | | Swing | | |

=== Elections in 1930s ===
==== November 1930 ====
1930
| Party | Candidate | Votes | % | ±% |
|---|---|---|---|---|
| Labour | R. Moss | 3,037 | 66.6 | −30.1 |
| Independent | C. G. Clancy | 1,427 | 31.3 | N/A |
| Communist | S. Nuttall | 98 | 2.1 | −1.2 |
| Majority | | 1,610 | 35.3 | −58.1 |
| Turnout | | 4,562 | | |
| Labour hold | | Swing | | |

==== November 1931 ====
1931
| Party | Candidate | Votes | % | ±% |
|---|---|---|---|---|
| Labour | J. Toole* | 3,119 | 54.2 | −12.4 |
| Conservative | J. Campbell | 2,479 | 43.1 | N/A |
| Communist | A. Jackson | 158 | 2.7 | +0.6 |
| Majority | | 640 | 11.1 | −24.2 |
| Turnout | | 5,756 | 56.8 | |
| Labour hold | | Swing | | |

==== November 1932 ====
1932
| Party | Candidate | Votes | % | ±% |
|---|---|---|---|---|
| Labour | W. H. Oldfield* | 3,759 | 73.4 | +19.2 |
| Conservative | J. Campbell | 1,186 | 23.2 | −19.9 |
| Communist | J. Parry | 174 | 3.4 | +0.7 |
| Majority | | 2,573 | 50.2 | +39.1 |
| Turnout | | 5,119 | | |
| Labour hold | | Swing | | |

==== November 1933 ====
1933
| Party | Candidate | Votes | % | ±% |
|---|---|---|---|---|
| Labour | R. Moss* | 2,726 | 91.4 | +18.0 |
| Communist | D. Ainley | 258 | 8.6 | +5.2 |
| Majority | | 2,468 | 82.8 | +32.6 |
| Turnout | | 2,984 | | |
| Labour hold | | Swing | | |

==== November 1934 ====
1934
| Party | Candidate | Votes | % | ±% |
|---|---|---|---|---|
| Labour | J. Toole* | 3,428 | 75.4 | −16.0 |
| Conservative | E. M. Buckley | 999 | 22.0 | N/A |
| Communist | G. Brown | 108 | 2.4 | −6.2 |
| Independent | T. Kilgariff | 12 | 0.2 | N/A |
| Majority | | 2,429 | 64.4 | −18.4 |
| Turnout | | 4,547 | | |
| Labour hold | | Swing | | |

==== March 1935 (by-election) ====
By-election: 26 March 1935
| Party | Candidate | Votes | % | ±% |
|---|---|---|---|---|
| Labour | J. Casson | uncontested | | |
| Labour hold | | Swing | | |

==== November 1935 ====
1935
| Party | Candidate | Votes | % | ±% |
|---|---|---|---|---|
| Labour | W. H. Oldfield* | uncontested | | |
| Labour hold | | Swing | | |

==== November 1936 ====
1936
| Party | Candidate | Votes | % | ±% |
|---|---|---|---|---|
| Labour | R. Moss* | uncontested | | |
| Labour hold | | Swing | | |

==== November 1937 ====
1937
| Party | Candidate | Votes | % | ±% |
|---|---|---|---|---|
| Labour | T. Nally | uncontested | | |
| Labour hold | | Swing | | |

==== November 1938 ====
1938
| Party | Candidate | Votes | % | ±% |
|---|---|---|---|---|
| Labour | W. H. Oldfield* | uncontested | | |
| Labour hold | | Swing | | |

=== Elections in 1940s ===
==== November 1945 ====
1945
| Party | Candidate | Votes | % | ±% |
|---|---|---|---|---|
| Labour | R. Moss* | 3,614 | 79.7 | N/A |
| Conservative | L. H. Nesbitt | 917 | 20.2 | N/A |
| Majority | | 2,697 | 59.5 | N/A |
| Turnout | | 4,531 | 35.0 | |
| Labour hold | | Swing | | |

==== December 1945 (by-election) ====
By-election: 6 December 1945
| Party | Candidate | Votes | % | ±% |
|---|---|---|---|---|
| Labour | L. Thomas | 1,990 | 81.1 | +1.4 |
| Residents | R. Frere | 464 | 18.9 | N/A |
| Majority | | 1,526 | 62.2 | +2.7 |
| Turnout | | 2,454 | | |
| Labour hold | | Swing | | |

==== November 1946 ====
1946
| Party | Candidate | Votes | % | ±% |
|---|---|---|---|---|
| Labour | T. Nally* | 2,825 | 69.5 | −10.2 |
| Conservative | C. Parker | 1,004 | 24.7 | +4.5 |
| Communist | T. Rowlandson | 237 | 5.8 | N/A |
| Majority | | 1,821 | 44.8 | −14.7 |
| Turnout | | 4,066 | | |
| Labour hold | | Swing | | |

==== November 1947 ====
1947
| Party | Candidate | Votes | % | ±% |
|---|---|---|---|---|
| Labour | S. Jolly | 4,206 | 58.4 | −11.1 |
| Conservative | T. Sparrow | 2,728 | 37.9 | +13.2 |
| Communist | T. Rowlandson | 268 | 3.7 | −2.1 |
| Majority | | 1,478 | 20.5 | −24.3 |
| Turnout | | 7,202 | | |
| Labour hold | | Swing | | |

==== May 1949 ====
1949
| Party | Candidate | Votes | % | ±% |
|---|---|---|---|---|
| Labour | L. Thomas* | 4,694 | 61.5 | +3.1 |
| Conservative | W. R. Swan | 2,819 | 36.9 | −1.0 |
| Communist | S. Wild | 122 | 1.6 | −2.1 |
| Majority | | 1,875 | 24.6 | +4.1 |
| Turnout | | 7,635 | | |
| Labour hold | | Swing | | |

=== Elections in 1950s ===
==== May 1950 ====
1950 (new boundaries)
| Party | Candidate | Votes | % | ±% |
|---|---|---|---|---|
| Labour | T. Nally* | 4,579 | 58.8 | |
| Conservative | W. R. Swan | 3,030 | 38.9 | |
| Communist | T. Rowlandson | 184 | 2.3 | |
| Majority | | 1,549 | 19.9 | |
| Turnout | | 7,793 | | |
| Labour hold | | Swing | | |

==== May 1951 ====
1951
| Party | Candidate | Votes | % | ±% |
|---|---|---|---|---|
| Labour | S. Jolly* | 3,884 | 57.8 | −1.0 |
| Conservative | J. C. Robertson | 2,614 | 38.9 | 0 |
| Communist | T. Rowlandson | 217 | 3.3 | +1.0 |
| Majority | | 1,270 | 18.9 | −1.0 |
| Turnout | | 6,715 | | |
| Labour hold | | Swing | | |

==== May 1952 ====
1952
| Party | Candidate | Votes | % | ±% |
|---|---|---|---|---|
| Labour | L. Thomas* | 5,607 | 74.5 | +16.7 |
| Conservative | L. Lescure | 1,924 | 25.5 | −13.4 |
| Majority | | 3,683 | 49.0 | +30.1 |
| Turnout | | 7,531 | | |
| Labour hold | | Swing | | |

==== May 1953 ====
1953
| Party | Candidate | Votes | % | ±% |
|---|---|---|---|---|
| Labour | T. Nally* | 4,295 | 70.6 | −3.9 |
| Conservative | L. Lescure | 1,788 | 29.4 | +3.9 |
| Majority | | 2,507 | 41.2 | −7.8 |
| Turnout | | 6,083 | | |
| Labour hold | | Swing | | |

==== May 1954 ====
1954
| Party | Candidate | Votes | % | ±% |
|---|---|---|---|---|
| Labour | S. Jolly* | 4,202 | 72.1 | +1.5 |
| Conservative | E. Fitzsimons | 1,475 | 25.3 | −4.1 |
| Communist | F. Dean | 149 | 2.6 | N/A |
| Majority | | 2,727 | 46.8 | +5.6 |
| Turnout | | 5,826 | | |
| Labour hold | | Swing | | |

==== May 1955 ====
1955
| Party | Candidate | Votes | % | ±% |
|---|---|---|---|---|
| Labour | L. Thomas* | 3,743 | 67.7 | −4.4 |
| Conservative | E. Fitzsimons | 1,628 | 29.5 | +4.2 |
| Communist | J. Hodgson | 154 | 2.8 | +0.2 |
| Majority | | 2,115 | 38.2 | −8.6 |
| Turnout | | 5,525 | | |
| Labour hold | | Swing | | |

==== May 1956 ====
1956
| Party | Candidate | Votes | % | ±% |
|---|---|---|---|---|
| Labour | M. E. Morley | 3,157 | 71.7 | +4.0 |
| Conservative | E. D. Lowe | 1,063 | 24.2 | −5.3 |
| Communist | J. Hodgson | 181 | 4.1 | +1.3 |
| Majority | | 2,094 | 47.5 | +9.3 |
| Turnout | | 4,401 | | |
| Labour hold | | Swing | | |

==== May 1957 ====
1957
| Party | Candidate | Votes | % | ±% |
|---|---|---|---|---|
| Labour | S. Jolly* | 3,452 | 74.7 | +3.0 |
| Conservative | E. D. Lowe | 1,032 | 22.3 | −1.9 |
| Communist | J. Hodgson | 139 | 3.0 | −1.1 |
| Majority | | 2,420 | 52.4 | +4.9 |
| Turnout | | 3,623 | | |
| Labour hold | | Swing | | |

==== May 1958 ====
1958
| Party | Candidate | Votes | % | ±% |
|---|---|---|---|---|
| Labour | L. Thomas* | 3,428 | 79.6 | +4.9 |
| Conservative | J. Mitton | 723 | 16.8 | −5.5 |
| Communist | J. Hodgson | 157 | 3.6 | +0.6 |
| Majority | | 2,705 | 62.8 | +10.4 |
| Turnout | | 4,308 | | |
| Labour hold | | Swing | | |

==== May 1959 ====
1959
| Party | Candidate | Votes | % | ±% |
|---|---|---|---|---|
| Labour | M. E. Morley* | 3,233 | 68.6 | −11.0 |
| Conservative | P. Collins | 1,323 | 28.1 | +11.3 |
| Communist | H. Holland | 159 | 3.3 | −0.3 |
| Majority | | 1,910 | 40.5 | −22.3 |
| Turnout | | 4,715 | | |
| Labour hold | | Swing | | |

=== Elections in 1960s ===
==== May 1960 ====
1960
| Party | Candidate | Votes | % | ±% |
|---|---|---|---|---|
| Labour | S. Jolly* | 2,428 | 63.8 | −4.8 |
| Conservative | B. Moore | 1,264 | 33.2 | +5.1 |
| Communist | N. Gilroy | 112 | 3.0 | −0.3 |
| Majority | | 1,164 | 30.6 | −9.9 |
| Turnout | | 3,804 | | |
| Labour hold | | Swing | | |

==== May 1961 ====
1961
| Party | Candidate | Votes | % | ±% |
|---|---|---|---|---|
| Labour | L. Thomas* | 2,817 | 66.9 | +3.1 |
| Conservative | B. Moore | 1,262 | 30.0 | −3.2 |
| Communist | H. Holland | 129 | 3.1 | +0.1 |
| Majority | | 1,555 | 36.9 | +6.3 |
| Turnout | | 4,208 | | |
| Labour hold | | Swing | | |

==== May 1962 ====
1962
| Party | Candidate | Votes | % | ±% |
|---|---|---|---|---|
| Labour | M. E. Morley* | 2,775 | 72.6 | +5.7 |
| Conservative | H. Woodman | 876 | 22.9 | −7.1 |
| Communist | H. Holland | 123 | 3.2 | +0.1 |
| Union Movement | W. D. Hesketh | 49 | 1.3 | N/A |
| Majority | | 1,899 | 49.7 | +12.8 |
| Turnout | | 3,823 | | |
| Labour hold | | Swing | | |

==== May 1963 ====
1963
| Party | Candidate | Votes | % | ±% |
|---|---|---|---|---|
| Labour | S. Jolly* | 3,003 | 76.6 | +4.0 |
| Conservative | H. Woodman | 793 | 20.2 | −2.7 |
| Communist | H. Holland | 123 | 3.2 | 0 |
| Majority | | 2,210 | 56.4 | +6.7 |
| Turnout | | 3,919 | | |
| Labour hold | | Swing | | |

==== November 1963 (by-election) ====
By-election: 7 November 1963 (2 vacancies)
| Party | Candidate | Votes | % | ±% |
|---|---|---|---|---|
| Labour | T. O. Hamnett | 2,334 | 66.9 | −9.7 |
| Labour | P. J. Donoghue | 2,256 | 64.7 | −11.9 |
| Conservative | E. Eccles | 967 | 27.7 | +7.5 |
| Conservative | E. A. M. Walmsley | 871 | 25.0 | +4.8 |
| Communist | H. Holland | 274 | 7.9 | +4.7 |
| Majority | | 1,289 | 37.0 | −19.4 |
| Turnout | | 3,488 | | |
| Labour hold | | Swing | | |
| Labour hold | | Swing | | |

==== May 1964 ====
1964
| Party | Candidate | Votes | % | ±% |
|---|---|---|---|---|
| Labour | P. J. Donoghue* | 2,691 | 69.0 | −7.6 |
| Conservative | E. Eccles | 1,061 | 27.2 | +7.0 |
| Communist | H. Holland | 148 | 3.8 | +0.5 |
| Majority | | 1,630 | 41.8 | −14.6 |
| Turnout | | 3,900 | | |
| Labour hold | | Swing | | |

==== May 1965 ====
1965 (2 vacancies)
| Party | Candidate | Votes | % | ±% |
|---|---|---|---|---|
| Labour | J. Gilmore | 2,175 | 61.9 | −7.1 |
| Labour | T. O. Hamnett* | 1,930 | 54.9 | −14.1 |
| Conservative | E. Eccles | 1,366 | 38.9 | +11.7 |
| Conservative | J. L. Traynor | 1,206 | 34.3 | +7.1 |
| Communist | K. McDonald | 176 | 5.0 | +1.2 |
| Communist | H. Holland | 172 | 4.9 | +1.1 |
| Majority | | 564 | 16.1 | −25.7 |
| Turnout | | 3,513 | | |
| Labour hold | | Swing | | |
| Labour hold | | Swing | | |

==== May 1966 ====
1966
| Party | Candidate | Votes | % | ±% |
|---|---|---|---|---|
| Labour | T. O. Hamnett* | 1,937 | 65.0 | +3.1 |
| Conservative | E. Eccles | 970 | 32.5 | −6.4 |
| Communist | H. Holland | 74 | 2.5 | −2.5 |
| Majority | | 967 | 32.5 | +16.4 |
| Turnout | | 2,981 | | |
| Labour hold | | Swing | | |

==== May 1967 ====
1967
| Party | Candidate | Votes | % | ±% |
|---|---|---|---|---|
| Labour | P. J. Donoghue* | 1,548 | 48.3 | −16.7 |
| Conservative | J. L. Traynor | 1,517 | 47.3 | +14.8 |
| Communist | N. Gilroy | 141 | 4.4 | +1.9 |
| Majority | | 31 | 1.0 | −31.5 |
| Turnout | | 3,206 | | |
| Labour hold | | Swing | | |

==== May 1968 ====
1968
| Party | Candidate | Votes | % | ±% |
|---|---|---|---|---|
| Labour | J. Gilmore* | 1,757 | 48.1 | −0.2 |
| Conservative | J. L. Traynor | 1,668 | 45.7 | −1.6 |
| Communist | N. Gilroy | 227 | 6.2 | +1.8 |
| Majority | | 89 | 2.4 | +1.4 |
| Turnout | | 3,652 | | |
| Labour hold | | Swing | | |

==== February 1969 (by-election) ====
By-election: 27 February 1969
| Party | Candidate | Votes | % | ±% |
|---|---|---|---|---|
| Labour | E. Grant | 1,610 | 56.0 | +7.9 |
| Conservative | A. Nixon | 1,161 | 40.4 | −5.3 |
| Communist | N. Gilroy | 106 | 3.6 | −2.6 |
| Majority | | 449 | 15.6 | +13.2 |
| Turnout | | 2,877 | | |
| Labour hold | | Swing | | |

==== May 1969 ====
1969
| Party | Candidate | Votes | % | ±% |
|---|---|---|---|---|
| Labour | T. O. Hamnett* | 1,795 | 54.4 | +6.3 |
| Conservative | E. Eccles | 1,502 | 45.6 | −0.1 |
| Majority | | 293 | 8.8 | +6.4 |
| Turnout | | 3,297 | | |
| Labour hold | | Swing | | |

=== Elections in 1970s ===
==== May 1970 ====
1970
| Party | Candidate | Votes | % | ±% |
|---|---|---|---|---|
| Labour | E. Grant* | 2,110 | 64.9 | +10.5 |
| Conservative | D. S. Knox-Crichton | 1,093 | 33.6 | −12.0 |
| Communist | K. M. Baylis | 47 | 1.5 | N/A |
| Majority | | 1,017 | 31.3 | +22.5 |
| Turnout | | 3,250 | | |
| Labour hold | | Swing | | |

== See also ==
- Manchester City Council
- Manchester City Council elections
