= 1907 Manchester City Council election =

Local election in Manchester

- 1 November 1907

31 of 124 seats to Manchester City Council 63 seats needed for a majority
	First party	Second party	Third party
Party	Conservative	Liberal	Labour
Last election	16 seats, 49.3%	10 seats, 26.4%	4 seats, 24.3%
Seats before	53	55	12
Seats won	17	8	2
Seats after	56	52	11
Seat change	▲3	▼3	▼1
Popular vote	18,611	8,805	8,839
Percentage	46.2%	21.8%	21.9%
Swing	▼3.1%	▼4.6%	▼2.4%
	Fourth party
Party	Independent
Last election	1 seats, 0.0%
Seats before	4
Seats won	4
Seats after	5
Seat change	▲1
Popular vote	4,065
Percentage	10.1%
Swing	▲10.1%
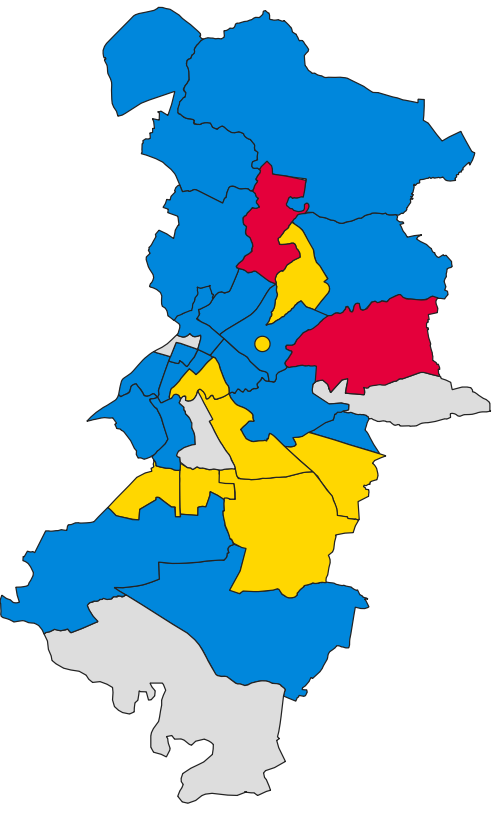
- Map of results of 1907 election
Leader of the Council before election
No overall control
Leader of the Council after election
No overall control

Elections to Manchester City Council were held on Friday, 1 November 1907. One third of the councillors seats were up for election, with each successful candidate to serve a three-year term of office. The council remained under no overall control.

== Election result ==
Party	Votes		Seats			Full Council	
Conservative Party	18,611 (46.2%)	▼3.1	17 (54.8%)	17 / 31	▲3	56 (45.2%)	56 / 124
Liberal Party	8,805 (21.8%)	▼4.6	8 (25.8%)	8 / 31	▼3	52 (41.9%)	52 / 124
Labour Party	8,839 (21.9%)	▼2.4	2 (6.5%)	2 / 31	▼1	11 (8.9%)	11 / 124
Independent	4,065 (10.1%)	▲10.1	4 (12.9%)	4 / 31	▲1	5 (4.0%)	5 / 124

=== Full council ===
↓
11	52	5	56

=== Aldermen ===
↓
20	11

=== Councillors ===
↓
11	32	5	45

== Ward results ==
=== All Saints' ===
All Saints'
Party	Candidate	Votes	%	±%
Independent	H. M. Ross Clyne*	1,117	59.1	N/A
Conservative	P. Stallard	772	40.9	N/A
Majority		345	18.2	N/A
Turnout		1,889		
Independent hold		Swing		

=== Ardwick ===
Ardwick
Party	Candidate	Votes	%	±%
Conservative	J. Smith	2,231	56.9	+9.5
Labour	T. Lowth*	1,600	40.8	−11.8
Independent	A. R. Brown	89	2.3	N/A
Majority		631	16.1	
Turnout		3,920		
Conservative gain from Labour		Swing		

=== Blackley and Moston ===
Blackley and Moston
Party	Candidate	Votes	%	±%
Conservative	C. G. L. Skinner*	uncontested		
Conservative hold		Swing		

=== Bradford ===
Bradford
Party	Candidate	Votes	%	±%
Labour	T. Fox*	uncontested		
Labour hold		Swing		

=== Cheetham ===
Cheetham
Party	Candidate	Votes	%	±%
Conservative	J. Williams*	uncontested		
Conservative hold		Swing		

=== Chorlton-cum-Hardy ===
Chorlton-cum-Hardy
Party	Candidate	Votes	%	±%
Conservative	J. Turner*	1,243	60.6	N/A
Liberal	A. Thomson	807	39.4	N/A
Majority		436	21.2	N/A
Turnout		2,050		
Conservative hold		Swing		

=== Collegiate Church ===
Collegiate Church
Party	Candidate	Votes	%	±%
Conservative	J. R. Smith*	uncontested		
Conservative hold		Swing		

=== Crumpsall ===
Crumpsall
Party	Candidate	Votes	%	±%
Conservative	G. F. H. Gibson*	uncontested		
Conservative hold		Swing		

=== Didsbury ===
Didsbury
Party	Candidate	Votes	%	±%
Independent	F. Moss*	uncontested		
Independent hold		Swing		

=== Exchange ===
Exchange
Party	Candidate	Votes	%	±%
Independent	A. M. H Gardiner	353	53.3	N/A
Liberal	J. Broxap*	309	46.7	N/A
Majority		44	6.6	N/A
Turnout		662		
Independent gain from Liberal		Swing		

=== Harpurhey ===
Harpurhey
Party	Candidate	Votes	%	±%
Labour	W. T. Jackson	1,986	44.6	−5.1
Conservative	A. Whitfield	1,619	36.4	−13.9
Liberal	J. Rickard	804	18.1	N/A
Independent	J. Stanton	39	0.9	N/A
Majority		367	8.2	
Turnout		4,448		
Labour gain from Liberal		Swing		

=== Longsight ===
Longsight
Party	Candidate	Votes	%	±%
Liberal	H. Hodkin*	911	43.8	N/A
Conservative	W. H. Cook	682	32.8	−25.3
Labour	T. A. Flynn	486	23.4	−18.5
Majority		229	11.0	
Turnout		2,079		
Liberal hold		Swing		

=== Medlock Street ===
Medlock Street
Party	Candidate	Votes	%	±%
Conservative	H. White*	uncontested		
Conservative hold		Swing		

=== Miles Platting ===
Miles Platting
Party	Candidate	Votes	%	±%
Liberal	J. Kemp*	uncontested		
Liberal hold		Swing		

=== Moss Side East ===
Moss Side East
Party	Candidate	Votes	%	±%
Liberal	J. Wynne	904	53.4	+15.7
Independent	C. Green	788	46.6	N/A
Majority		116	6.8	
Turnout		1,692		
Liberal gain from Independent		Swing		

=== Moss Side West ===
Moss Side West
Party	Candidate	Votes	%	±%
Liberal	A. Grierson*	uncontested		
Liberal hold		Swing		

=== New Cross ===
New Cross
Party	Candidate	Votes	%	±%
Conservative	J. Grime*	2,460	65.7	+7.5
Liberal	G. Howarth*	1,502	40.1	−8.7
Labour	M. Atherton	1,069	28.5	N/A
Majority		433	11.6	−2.4
Turnout		3,746		
Conservative hold		Swing		
Liberal hold		Swing		

=== Newton Heath ===
Newton Heath
Party	Candidate	Votes	%	±%
Conservative	F. J. West*	1,645	63.9	N/A
Labour	T. Fox	928	36.1	−13.4
Majority		717	27.8	
Turnout		2,573		
Conservative hold		Swing		

=== Openshaw ===
Openshaw
Party	Candidate	Votes	%	±%
Independent	J. Caminada	1,479	54.0	N/A
Labour	J. B. Williams*	1,262	46.0	N/A
Majority		217	8.0	N/A
Turnout		2,741		
Independent gain from Labour		Swing		

=== Oxford ===
Oxford
Party	Candidate	Votes	%	±%
Liberal	H. Elverston*	uncontested		
Liberal hold		Swing		

=== Rusholme ===
Rusholme
Party	Candidate	Votes	%	±%
Liberal	H. Plummer*	uncontested		
Liberal hold		Swing		

=== St. Ann's ===
St. Ann's
Party	Candidate	Votes	%	±%
Conservative	J. Burgess	531	46.0	N/A
Liberal	T. Stephens*	494	42.8	N/A
Independent	E. Jones	130	11.2	N/A
Majority		37	3.2	N/A
Turnout		1,155		
Conservative gain from Liberal		Swing		

=== St. Clement's ===
St. Clement's
Party	Candidate	Votes	%	±%
Conservative	T. Hassall*	uncontested		
Conservative hold		Swing		

=== St. George's ===
St. George's
Party	Candidate	Votes	%	±%
Conservative	W. Kay*	2,264	74.3	+31.6
Liberal	M. Ashton	785	25.7	−13.8
Majority		1,479	48.6	+45.4
Turnout		3,049		
Conservative hold		Swing		

=== St. James' ===
St. James'
Party	Candidate	Votes	%	±%
Conservative	A. H. Megson	431	62.1	N/A
Liberal	E. Holt*	263	37.9	N/A
Majority		168	24.2	N/A
Turnout		694		
Conservative gain from Liberal		Swing		

=== St. John's ===
St. John's
Party	Candidate	Votes	%	±%
Conservative	H. Shuttleworth*	417	53.7	+8.1
Liberal	P. Earley	360	46.3	−8.1
Majority		57	7.4	
Turnout		777		
Conservative hold		Swing		

=== St. Luke's ===
St. Luke's
Party	Candidate	Votes	%	±%
Liberal	J. H. Thewlis*	uncontested		
Liberal hold		Swing		

=== St. Mark's ===
St. Mark's
Party	Candidate	Votes	%	±%
Conservative	W. Chapman	987	65.7	N/A
Labour	R. Robinson	516	34.3	N/A
Majority		471	31.4	N/A
Turnout		1,503		
Conservative hold		Swing		

=== St. Michael's ===
St. Michael's
Party	Candidate	Votes	%	±%
Conservative	A. Hibbert*	1,405	54.4	N/A
Liberal	J. Reilly	1,179	45.6	N/A
Majority		226	8.8	N/A
Turnout		2,584		
Conservative hold		Swing		

=== Withington ===
Withington
Party	Candidate	Votes	%	±%
Conservative	S. Edwards*	630	53.1	−6.9
Liberal	H. Vick	487	41.0	+1.0
Independent	A. E. Wachter	70	5.9	N/A
Majority		143	12.1	−7.9
Turnout		1,187		
Conservative hold		Swing		

== Aldermanic elections ==
=== Aldermanic election, 9 November 1907 ===
At the meeting of the council on 9 November 1907, the terms of office of sixteen aldermen expired.

The following sixteen were elected as aldermen by the council on 9 November 1907 for a term of six years.

Party	Alderman	Ward	Term expires
Conservative	Thomas Briggs*		1913
Conservative	James Fildes*	Openshaw	1913
Liberal	John Frowde*	Moss Side West	1913
Liberal	Robert Gibson*		1913
Conservative	Charles Jennison*	St. Ann's	1913
Liberal	Sir Bosdin Leech*		1913
Liberal	Daniel McCabe*	St. Michael's	1913
Liberal	Alexander McDougall*	All Saints'	1913
Liberal	William Norquoy*	Withington	1913
Conservative	John Richards*		1913
Conservative	W. T. Rothwell*	Oxford	1913
Liberal	Sir James Wilson Southern*	St. Luke's	1913
Liberal	Joseph Thompson*	Ardwick	1913
Liberal	Thomas Turnbull*	Chorlton-cum-Hardy	1913
Liberal	John Ward*	Blackley & Moston	1913
Liberal	W. H. Wainwright*	Medlock Street	1913

=== Aldermanic election, 4 December 1907 ===
Caused by the resignation on 22 November 1907 of Alderman J. H. Wells (Liberal, elected as an alderman by the council on 3 August 1904).

In his place, Councillor Henry Plummer (Liberal, Rusholme, elected 1 November 1892) was elected as an alderman by the council on 4 December 1907.

Party	Alderman	Ward	Term expires
Liberal	Henry Plummer	Rusholme	1910

=== Aldermanic election, 8 April 1908 ===
Caused by the death on 6 March 1908 of Alderman Sir James Hoy (Liberal, elected as an alderman by the council on 21 June 1893).

In his place, Councillor John Royle (Liberal, Collegiate Church, elected 2 July 1894) was elected as an alderman by the council on 8 April 1908.

Party	Alderman	Ward	Term expires
Liberal	John Royle		1910

== By-elections between 1907 and 1908 ==
=== Rusholme, 17 December 1907 ===
Caused by the election as an alderman of Councillor Henry Plummer (Liberal, Rusholme, elected 1 November 1892) on 4 December 1907 following the resignation on 22 November 1907 of Alderman J. H. Wells (Liberal, elected as an alderman by the council on 3 August 1904).

Rusholme
Party	Candidate	Votes	%	±%
Conservative	J. D. Chantler	1,453	51.7	N/A
Liberal	J. C. B. Percy	1,356	48.3	N/A
Majority		97	3.4	N/A
Turnout		2,809		
Conservative gain from Liberal		Swing		

=== Collegiate Church, 22 April 1908 ===
Caused by the election as an alderman of Councillor John Royle (Liberal, Collegiate Church, elected 2 July 1894) on 8 April 1908 following the death on 6 March 1908 of Alderman Sir James Hoy (Liberal, elected as an alderman by the council on 21 June 1893).

Collegiate Church
Party	Candidate	Votes	%	±%
Conservative	C. F. Poyser	445	52.1	N/A
Liberal	G. B. Birdsall	409	47.9	N/A
Majority		36	4.2	N/A
Turnout		854		
Conservative gain from Liberal		Swing		
