= 1897 Manchester City Council election =

Local election in Manchester

- 1 November 1897

26 of 104 seats to Manchester City Council 53 seats needed for a majority
	First party	Second party	Third party
Party	Liberal	Conservative	Liberal Unionist
Last election	9 seats, 37.1%	16 seats, 38.2%	1 seats, 3.7%
Seats before	47	48	6
Seats won	10	12	0
Seats after	50	46	4
Seat change	▲3	▼2	▼2
Popular vote	17,306	24,722	1,664
Percentage	32.2%	45.9%	3.1%
Swing	▼4.9%	▲7.7%	▼0.6%
	Fourth party	Fifth party	Sixth party
Party	Ind. Labour Party	Social Democratic Federation	Independent
Last election	0 seats, 19.4%	0 seats, 3.4%	0 seats, 0.6%
Seats before	2	0	1
Seats won	2	1	1
Seats after	2	1	1
Seat change	Steady	▲1	Steady
Popular vote	7,851	1,798	464
Percentage	14.6%	3.3%	0.9%
Swing	▼4.8%	▼0.1%	▲0.3%
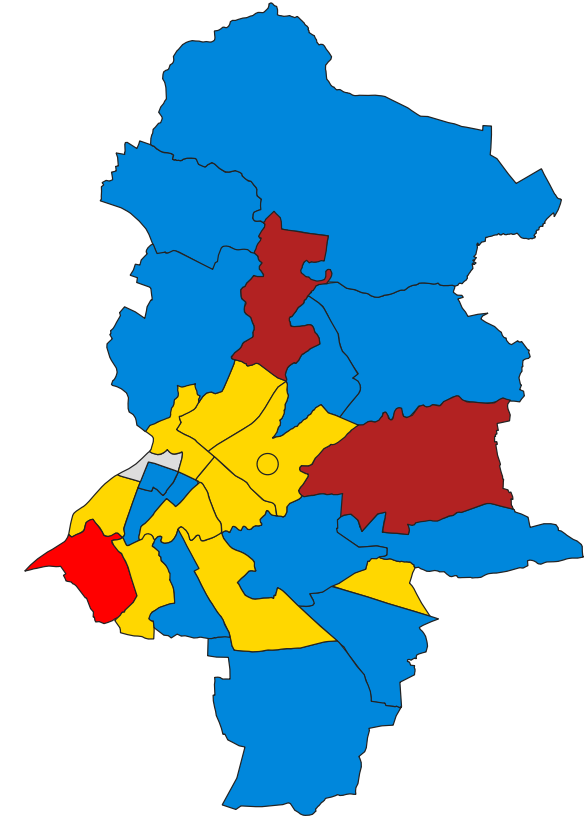
- Map of results of 1897 election
Leader of the Council before election
No overall control
Leader of the Council after election
No overall control

Elections to Manchester City Council were held on Monday, 1 November 1897. One third of the councillors seats were up for election, with each successful candidate to serve a three-year term of office. The council remained under no overall control.

== Election result ==
Party	Votes		Seats			Full Council	
Liberal Party	17,306 (32.2%)	▼4.9	10 (38.5%)	10 / 26	▲3	50 (48.1%)	50 / 104
Conservative Party	24,722 (45.9%)	▲7.7	12 (46.2%)	12 / 26	▼2	46 (44.2%)	46 / 104
Liberal Unionist	1,664 (3.1%)	▼0.6	0 (0.0%)	0 / 26	▼2	4 (3.8%)	4 / 104
Ind. Labour Party	7,851 (14.6%)	▼4.8	2 (7.7%)	2 / 26	Steady	2 (1.9%)	2 / 104
Social Democratic Federation	1,798 (3.3%)	▼0.1	1 (3.8%)	1 / 26	▲1	1 (1.0%)	1 / 104
Independent	464 (0.9%)	▲0.3	1 (3.8%)	1 / 26	Steady	1 (1.0%)	1 / 104

=== Full council ===
↓
1	2	50	1	4	46

=== Aldermen ===
↓
16	3	8

=== Councillors ===
↓
1	2	34	1	1	38

== Ward results ==
=== All Saints' ===
All Saints'
Party	Candidate	Votes	%	±%
Conservative	C. Hornby	1,175	51.2	N/A
Liberal	J. D. Pennington	1,119	48.8	N/A
Majority		56	2.4	N/A
Turnout		2,294		
Conservative hold		Swing		

=== Ardwick ===
Ardwick
Party	Candidate	Votes	%	±%
Conservative	J. Whittaker	2,358	56.4	+4.9
Liberal	J. Shaw	1,821	43.6	−4.9
Majority		537	12.8	+9.8
Turnout		4,179		
Conservative hold		Swing		

=== Blackley and Moston ===
Blackley and Moston
Party	Candidate	Votes	%	±%
Conservative	T. Briggs*	1,151	76.0	+23.1
Ind. Labour Party	W. Tweedale	363	24.0	N/A
Majority		788	52.0	+46.2
Turnout		1,514		
Conservative hold		Swing		

=== Bradford ===
Bradford
Party	Candidate	Votes	%	±%
Ind. Labour Party	J. E. Sutton*	2,378	50.5	N/A
Conservative	S. L. Keymer	2,333	49.5	N/A
Majority		45	1.0	N/A
Turnout		4,711		
Ind. Labour Party hold		Swing		

=== Cheetham ===
Cheetham
Party	Candidate	Votes	%	±%
Conservative	J. Hampson*	uncontested		
Conservative hold		Swing		

=== Collegiate Church ===
Collegiate Church
Party	Candidate	Votes	%	±%
Liberal	J. Royle*	656	50.9	N/A
Conservative	J. R. Smith	633	49.1	N/A
Majority		23	1.8	N/A
Turnout		1,289		
Liberal hold		Swing		

=== Crumpsall ===
Crumpsall
Party	Candidate	Votes	%	±%
Conservative	E. Holt*	uncontested		
Conservative hold		Swing		

=== Exchange ===
Exchange
Party	Candidate	Votes	%	±%
Independent	F. Moss*	464	64.3	N/A
Liberal Unionist	C. Hughes	258	35.7	N/A
Majority		206	28.6	
Turnout		722		
Independent hold		Swing		

=== Harpurhey ===
Harpurhey
Party	Candidate	Votes	%	±%
Ind. Labour Party	F. Brocklehurst	2,865	52.4	+21.4
Conservative	G. Needham*	2,606	47.6	+8.9
Majority		259	4.8	
Turnout		5,471		
Ind. Labour Party gain from Conservative		Swing		

=== Longsight ===
Longsight
Party	Candidate	Votes	%	±%
Conservative	J. Jones	1,033	56.8	N/A
Liberal	T. Uttley*	786	43.2	N/A
Majority		247	13.6	N/A
Turnout		1,819		
Conservative gain from Liberal		Swing		

=== Medlock Street ===
Medlock Street
Party	Candidate	Votes	%	±%
Liberal	W. T. Bax*	uncontested		
Liberal hold		Swing		

=== Miles Platting ===
Miles Platting
Party	Candidate	Votes	%	±%
Conservative	S. Dixon*	uncontested		
Conservative hold		Swing		

=== New Cross ===
New Cross
Party	Candidate	Votes	%	±%
Liberal	D. Boyle*	3,219	61.8	−8.5
Liberal	J. Simpson	2,683	51.5	−18.8
Conservative	J. Grime	2,510	48.2	−16.2
Conservative	J. N. Ogden*	2,008	38.5	−26.4
Majority		173	3.2	
Turnout		5,210		
Liberal hold		Swing		
Liberal gain from Conservative		Swing		

=== Newton Heath ===
Newton Heath
Party	Candidate	Votes	%	±%
Conservative	J. Garlick*	uncontested		
Conservative hold		Swing		

=== Openshaw ===
Openshaw
Party	Candidate	Votes	%	±%
Conservative	J. Pollitt	2,044	58.1	N/A
Ind. Labour Party	J. Butler*	1,473	41.9	+7.7
Majority		571	16.2	
Turnout		2,757		
Conservative gain from Ind. Labour Party		Swing		

=== Oxford ===
Oxford
Party	Candidate	Votes	%	±%
Liberal	W. Simpson*	uncontested		
Liberal hold		Swing		

=== Rusholme ===
Rusholme
Party	Candidate	Votes	%	±%
Conservative	G. K. Ashton	1,310	69.8	N/A
Conservative	F. E. Estcourt*	568	30.2	N/A
Majority		742	39.6	N/A
Turnout		1,878		
Conservative gain from Conservative		Swing		

=== St. Ann's ===
St. Ann's
Party	Candidate	Votes	%	±%
Conservative	W. H. Vaudrey*	689	74.4	N/A
Liberal	J. Bowie	237	25.6	N/A
Majority		452	48.8	N/A
Turnout		926		
Conservative hold		Swing		

=== St. Clement's ===
St. Clement's
Party	Candidate	Votes	%	±%
Liberal	J. Harrop	819	53.6	+9.2
Conservative	F. R. Cooper	708	46.4	−9.2
Majority		111	7.2	
Turnout		1,527		
Liberal gain from Conservative		Swing		

=== St. George's ===
St. George's
Party	Candidate	Votes	%	±%
Social Democratic Federation	W. Maben	1,798	53.3	+7.5
Conservative	S. W. Royse*	1,575	46.7	+0.3
Majority		223	6.6	
Turnout		3,373		
Social Democratic Federation gain from Conservative		Swing		

=== St. James' ===
St. James'
Party	Candidate	Votes	%	±%
Conservative	T. T. Shann	411	62.1	N/A
Liberal	T. A. Bazley	251	37.9	N/A
Majority		160	24.2	N/A
Turnout		662		
Conservative gain from Liberal Unionist		Swing		

=== St. John's ===
St. John's
Party	Candidate	Votes	%	±%
Liberal	M. Wells*	590	55.2	−0.6
Conservative	W. H. Huddleston	478	44.8	+0.6
Majority		112	10.4	−1.2
Turnout		1,068		
Liberal hold		Swing		

=== St. Luke's ===
St. Luke's
Party	Candidate	Votes	%	±%
Liberal	A. H. Scott	2,101	59.9	+1.9
Liberal Unionist	W. Sinclair*	1,406	40.1	N/A
Majority		695	19.8	+3.8
Turnout		3,507		
Liberal gain from Liberal Unionist		Swing		

=== St. Mark's ===
St. Mark's
Party	Candidate	Votes	%	±%
Liberal	W. H. Wainwright*	1,087	58.5	N/A
Ind. Labour Party	W. H. Griffiths	772	41.5	N/A
Majority		315	17.0	
Turnout		1,859		
Liberal hold		Swing		

=== St. Michael's ===
St. Michael's
Party	Candidate	Votes	%	±%
Liberal	T. Quinn Ruddin	1,937	63.1	N/A
Conservative	J. Faulkner*	1,132	36.9	N/A
Majority		805	26.2	N/A
Turnout		3,069		
Liberal gain from Conservative		Swing		

== Aldermanic elections ==
=== Aldermanic election, 18 May 1898 ===
Caused by the death on 2 May 1898 of Alderman John Roberts (Conservative, elected as an alderman by the council on 4 January 1893).

In his place, Councillor H. H. Mainwaring (Conservative, Medlock Street, elected 19 May 1886) was elected as an alderman by the council on 18 May 1898.

Party	Alderman	Ward	Term expires
Conservative	H. H. Mainwaring		1898

== By-elections between 1897 and 1898 ==
=== Harpurhey, 5 November 1897 ===
Caused by the election as an alderman of Councillor John Richards (Conservative, Harpurhey, elected 2 November 1885) on 20 October 1897 following the resignation on 6 October 1897 of Alderman John Mark (Liberal Unionist, elected as an alderman by the council on 30 October 1889).

Harpurhey
Party	Candidate	Votes	%	±%
Liberal	P. Whyman	2,972	61.4	N/A
Conservative	J. Hargreaves	1,870	38.6	−9.0
Majority		1,102	22.8	
Turnout		4,842		
Liberal gain from Conservative		Swing		

=== Openshaw, 20 May 1898 ===
Caused by the resignation of Councillor James Saxon (Liberal, Openshaw, elected 6 August 1891) on 4 May 1891.

Openshaw
Party	Candidate	Votes	%	±%
Conservative	G. Needham	1,058	44.5	−13.6
Ind. Labour Party	W. H. Taylor	760	32.0	−9.9
Lib-Lab	J. Butler*	557	23.5	N/A
Majority		298	12.5	−3.7
Turnout		2,375		
Conservative gain from Liberal		Swing		

=== Medlock Street, 28 May 1898 ===
Caused by the election as an alderman of Councillor H. H. Mainwaring (Conservative, Medlock Street, elected 19 May 1886) on 18 May 1898 following the death on 2 May 1898 of Alderman John Roberts (Conservative, elected as an alderman by the council on 4 January 1893).

Medlock Street
Party	Candidate	Votes	%	±%
Conservative	W. H. Hesketh	1,538	62.7	N/A
Liberal	I. Pearson	915	37.3	N/A
Majority		623	25.4	N/A
Turnout		2,453		
Conservative hold		Swing		
