= 1894 Manchester City Council election =

Local election in Manchester

- 1 November 1894

26 of 104 seats to Manchester City Council 53 seats needed for a majority
| | First party | Second party | Third party |
|---|---|---|---|
| Party | Liberal | Conservative | Liberal Unionist |
| Last election | 11 seats, 40.0% | 15 seats, 43.7% | 0 seats, 0.0% |
| Seats before | 48 | 48 | 8 |
| Seats won | 8 | 14 | 2 |
| Seats after | 48 | 47 | 7 |
| Seat change | Steady | ▼1 | ▼1 |
| Popular vote | 16,882 | 20,687 | 3,327 |
| Percentage | 33.3% | 40.1% | 6.6% |
| Swing | ▼6.7% | ▼3.6% | ▲6.6% |
| | Fourth party |
| Party | Ind. Labour Party |
| Last election | 0 seats, 15.8% |
| Seats before | 0 |
| Seats won | 2 |
| Seats after | 2 |
| Seat change | ▲2 |
| Popular vote | 10,032 |
| Percentage | 19.8% |
| Swing | ▲4.0% |
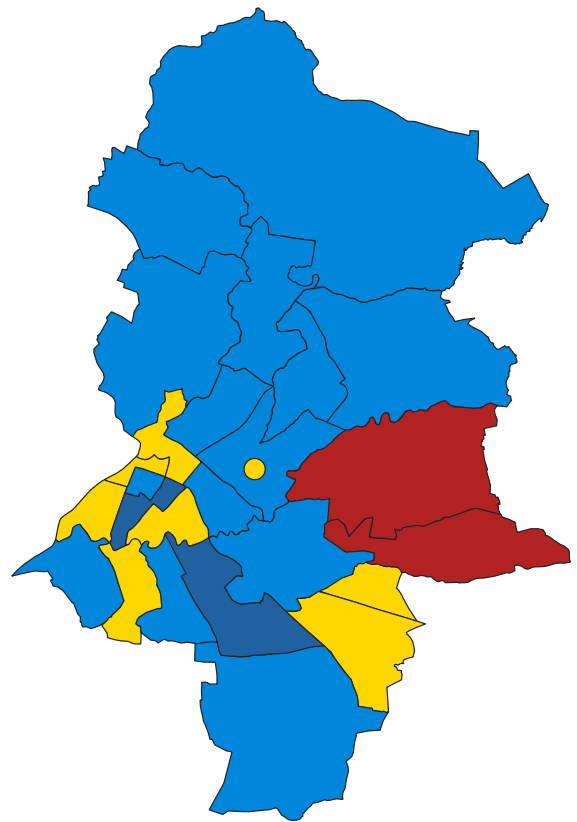
- Map of results of 1894 election
Leader of the Council before election
No overall control
Leader of the Council after election
No overall control

Elections to Manchester City Council were held on Thursday, 1 November 1894. One third of the councillors seats were up for election, with each successful candidate to serve a three-year term of office. The council remained under no overall control.

== Election result ==
| Party | Votes | | Seats | | | Full Council | |
| Liberal Party | 16,882 (33.3%) | ▼6.7 | 8 (30.8%) | 8 / 26 | Steady | 48 (46.2%) | 48 / 104 |
| Conservative Party | 20,287 (40.1%) | ▼3.6 | 14 (53.8%) | 14 / 26 | ▼1 | 47 (45.2%) | 47 / 104 |
| Liberal Unionist | 3,327 (6.6%) | ▲6.6 | 2 (7.7%) | 2 / 26 | ▼1 | 7 (6.7%) | 7 / 104 |
| Ind. Labour Party | 10,032 (19.8%) | ▲4.0 | 2 (7.7%) | 2 / 26 | ▲2 | 2 (1.9%) | 2 / 104 |
| Independent Liberal | 98 (0.2%) | N/A | 0 (0.0%) | 0 / 26 | N/A | 0 (0.0%) | 0 / 104 |

=== Full council ===
↓
| 2 | 48 | 7 | 47 |

=== Aldermen ===
↓
| 14 | 5 | 7 |

=== Councillors ===
↓
| 2 | 34 | 2 | 40 |

== Ward results ==
=== All Saints' ===
All Saints'
| Party | Candidate | Votes | % | ±% |
|---|---|---|---|---|
| Conservative | H. C. Smale | 1,041 | 60.3 | N/A |
| Ind. Labour Party | M. Deller | 686 | 39.7 | N/A |
| Majority | | 355 | 20.6 | N/A |
| Turnout | | 1,727 | | |
| Conservative hold | | Swing | | |

=== Ardwick ===
Ardwick
| Party | Candidate | Votes | % | ±% |
|---|---|---|---|---|
| Conservative | W. Fitzgerald* | 2,306 | 61.4 | +6.3 |
| Liberal | R. A. Brown | 1,448 | 38.6 | −6.3 |
| Majority | | 858 | 22.8 | +12.6 |
| Turnout | | 3,754 | | |
| Conservative hold | | Swing | | |

=== Blackley and Moston ===
Blackley and Moston
| Party | Candidate | Votes | % | ±% |
|---|---|---|---|---|
| Conservative | T. Briggs* | uncontested | | |
| Conservative hold | | Swing | | |

=== Bradford ===
Bradford
| Party | Candidate | Votes | % | ±% |
|---|---|---|---|---|
| Ind. Labour Party | J. E. Sutton | 2,072 | 54.4 | N/A |
| Conservative | E. Williams* | 1,737 | 45.6 | N/A |
| Majority | | 335 | 8.8 | N/A |
| Turnout | | 3,809 | | |
| Ind. Labour Party gain from Conservative | | Swing | | |

=== Cheetham ===
Cheetham
| Party | Candidate | Votes | % | ±% |
|---|---|---|---|---|
| Conservative | J. Hampson* | 1,508 | 65.8 | N/A |
| Liberal | R. Ramsbottom | 784 | 34.2 | N/A |
| Majority | | 724 | 31.6 | N/A |
| Turnout | | 2,292 | | |
| Conservative hold | | Swing | | |

=== Collegiate Church ===
Collegiate Church
| Party | Candidate | Votes | % | ±% |
|---|---|---|---|---|
| Liberal | J. Royle* | uncontested | | |
| Liberal hold | | Swing | | |

=== Crumpsall ===
Crumpsall
| Party | Candidate | Votes | % | ±% |
|---|---|---|---|---|
| Conservative | E. Holt* | uncontested | | |
| Conservative hold | | Swing | | |

=== Exchange ===
Exchange
| Party | Candidate | Votes | % | ±% |
|---|---|---|---|---|
| Liberal | F. Smallman* | 346 | 50.7 | −11.1 |
| Conservative | R. Cooper | 337 | 49.3 | N/A |
| Majority | | 9 | 1.4 | −22.2 |
| Turnout | | 683 | | |
| Liberal hold | | Swing | | |

=== Harpurhey ===
Harpurhey
| Party | Candidate | Votes | % | ±% |
|---|---|---|---|---|
| Conservative | G. Needham* | 2,616 | 54.8 | +12.3 |
| Liberal | G. W. Chadwick | 1,125 | 23.6 | −19.0 |
| Ind. Labour Party | J. Harker | 1,032 | 21.6 | +6.7 |
| Majority | | 1,491 | 31.2 | |
| Turnout | | 4,773 | | |
| Conservative hold | | Swing | | |

=== Longsight ===
Longsight
| Party | Candidate | Votes | % | ±% |
|---|---|---|---|---|
| Liberal | T. Uttley* | 783 | 50.7 | N/A |
| Conservative | J. Jones | 762 | 49.3 | N/A |
| Majority | | 21 | 1.4 | N/A |
| Turnout | | 1,545 | | |
| Liberal hold | | Swing | | |

=== Medlock Street ===
Medlock Street
| Party | Candidate | Votes | % | ±% |
|---|---|---|---|---|
| Liberal | W. T. Bax* | 1,782 | 65.0 | N/A |
| Ind. Labour Party | J. Lee | 959 | 35.0 | −4.2 |
| Majority | | 823 | 30.0 | |
| Turnout | | 2,741 | | |
| Liberal hold | | Swing | | |

=== Miles Platting ===
Miles Platting
| Party | Candidate | Votes | % | ±% |
|---|---|---|---|---|
| Conservative | S. Dixon | 1,083 | 49.7 | −8.0 |
| Ind. Labour Party | H. Henshall | 607 | 27.9 | −14.4 |
| Liberal | E. McGee | 488 | 22.4 | N/A |
| Majority | | 476 | 21.9 | +6.5 |
| Turnout | | 2,178 | | |
| Conservative hold | | Swing | | |

=== New Cross ===
New Cross
| Party | Candidate | Votes | % | ±% |
|---|---|---|---|---|
| Conservative | J. N. Ogden* | 1,950 | 38.5 | −0.3 |
| Liberal | D. Boyle | 1,938 | 39.3 | −0.8 |
| Liberal | E. M. Powell | 1,921 | 38.0 | −1.1 |
| Liberal Unionist | H. C. Pingstone* | 1,789 | 35.3 | N/A |
| Ind. Labour Party | J. Billam | 1,261 | 24.9 | −2.5 |
| Majority | | 17 | 0.3 | |
| Turnout | | 5,061 | | |
| Conservative hold | | Swing | | |
| Liberal gain from Liberal Unionist | | Swing | | |

=== Newton Heath ===
Newton Heath
| Party | Candidate | Votes | % | ±% |
|---|---|---|---|---|
| Conservative | J. Garlick* | 1,241 | 55.9 | −17.7 |
| Liberal | G. Evans | 981 | 44.1 | N/A |
| Majority | | 260 | 11.8 | −35.4 |
| Turnout | | 2,222 | | |
| Conservative hold | | Swing | | |

=== Openshaw ===
Openshaw
| Party | Candidate | Votes | % | ±% |
|---|---|---|---|---|
| Ind. Labour Party | J. Butler | 1,464 | 50.4 | N/A |
| Conservative | H. P. Ilderton | 1,442 | 49.6 | +12.0 |
| Majority | | 22 | 0.8 | |
| Turnout | | 2,906 | | |
| Ind. Labour Party gain from Conservative | | Swing | | |

=== Oxford ===
Oxford
| Party | Candidate | Votes | % | ±% |
|---|---|---|---|---|
| Liberal | W. Simpson* | uncontested | | |
| Liberal hold | | Swing | | |

=== Rusholme ===
Rusholme
| Party | Candidate | Votes | % | ±% |
|---|---|---|---|---|
| Conservative | F. E. Estcourt* | 823 | 53.1 | +18.8 |
| Liberal | E. C. Harding | 728 | 46.9 | −18.8 |
| Majority | | 95 | 6.2 | |
| Turnout | | 1,551 | | |
| Conservative hold | | Swing | | |

=== St. Ann's ===
St. Ann's
| Party | Candidate | Votes | % | ±% |
|---|---|---|---|---|
| Conservative | W. H. Vaudrey* | uncontested | | |
| Conservative hold | | Swing | | |

=== St. Clement's ===
St. Clement's
| Party | Candidate | Votes | % | ±% |
|---|---|---|---|---|
| Conservative | J. H. Andrews* | uncontested | | |
| Conservative hold | | Swing | | |

=== St. George's ===
St. George's
| Party | Candidate | Votes | % | ±% |
|---|---|---|---|---|
| Conservative | S. W. Royse | 1,826 | 50.6 | −11.9 |
| Liberal | P. Mooney | 1,166 | 32.3 | N/A |
| Ind. Labour Party | R. Anderson | 615 | 17.1 | −20.4 |
| Majority | | 660 | 18.3 | −6.7 |
| Turnout | | 3,607 | | |
| Conservative gain from Liberal | | Swing | | |

=== St. James' ===
St. James'
| Party | Candidate | Votes | % | ±% |
|---|---|---|---|---|
| Liberal Unionist | A. Murray* | uncontested | | |
| Liberal Unionist hold | | Swing | | |

=== St. John's ===
St. John's
| Party | Candidate | Votes | % | ±% |
|---|---|---|---|---|
| Liberal | M. Wells | 452 | 49.7 | −5.1 |
| Conservative | T. Watmough | 369 | 40.6 | −4.6 |
| Ind. Labour Party | W. Harley | 88 | 9.7 | N/A |
| Majority | | 83 | 9.1 | −0.5 |
| Turnout | | 909 | | |
| Liberal gain from Conservative | | Swing | | |

=== St. Luke's ===
St. Luke's
| Party | Candidate | Votes | % | ±% |
|---|---|---|---|---|
| Liberal Unionist | W. J. Sinclair* | 1,538 | 73.9 | N/A |
| Ind. Labour Party | F. Leeming | 542 | 26.1 | +10.2 |
| Majority | | 996 | 47.8 | |
| Turnout | | 2,080 | | |
| Liberal Unionist hold | | Swing | | |

=== St. Mark's ===
St. Mark's
| Party | Candidate | Votes | % | ±% |
|---|---|---|---|---|
| Liberal | W. H. Wainwright* | 1,140 | 61.8 | N/A |
| Ind. Labour Party | F. Lawler | 706 | 38.2 | −7.1 |
| Majority | | 434 | 23.6 | |
| Turnout | | 1,846 | | |
| Liberal hold | | Swing | | |

=== St. Michael's ===
St. Michael's
| Party | Candidate | Votes | % | ±% |
|---|---|---|---|---|
| Conservative | J. Faulkner | 1,246 | 40.1 | N/A |
| Liberal | T. Quinn Ruddin | 1,165 | 37.4 | +28.9 |
| Liberal | J. McCreesh* | 605 | 19.4 | −72.1 |
| Independent Liberal | W. Brown | 98 | 3.1 | −5.4 |
| Majority | | 81 | 2.7 | |
| Turnout | | 3,114 | | |
| Conservative gain from Liberal | | Swing | | |

== Aldermanic elections ==
=== Aldermanic election, 12 June 1895 ===
Caused by the death on 13 May 1895 of Alderman John Fletcher Hill (Conservative, elected as an alderman by the council on 10 November 1890).

In his place, Councillor Samuel Ashcroft (Conservative, All Saints', elected 1 November 1883) was elected as an alderman by the council on 12 June 1895.

| Party | Alderman | Ward | Term expires |
|---|---|---|---|
| Conservative | Samuel Ashcroft | | 1895 |

== By-elections between 1894 and 1895 ==
=== Medlock Street, 16 November 1894 ===
Caused by the resignation of Councillor Capt. Henry Cardwell (Conservative, Medlock Street, elected 1 November 1887) on 31 October 1894.

Medlock Street
| Party | Candidate | Votes | % | ±% |
|---|---|---|---|---|
| Liberal Unionist | N. Bradley | 1,644 | 59.5 | N/A |
| Ind. Labour Party | J. Lee | 1,121 | 40.5 | +5.5 |
| Majority | | 523 | 19.0 | |
| Turnout | | 2,765 | | |
| Liberal Unionist gain from Conservative | | Swing | | |

=== All Saints', 24 June 1895 ===
Caused by the election as an alderman of Councillor Samuel Ashcroft (Conservative, All Saints', elected 1 November 1883) on 12 June 1895 following the death on 13 May 1895 of Alderman John Fletcher Hill (Conservative, elected as an alderman by the council on 10 November 1890).

All Saints'
| Party | Candidate | Votes | % | ±% |
|---|---|---|---|---|
| Liberal | M. Arrandale | 854 | 53.4 | N/A |
| Conservative | A. Fulton | 746 | 46.6 | −13.7 |
| Majority | | 108 | 6.8 | |
| Turnout | | 1,600 | | |
| Liberal gain from Conservative | | Swing | | |
