= Newton Heath (ward) =

- Ward
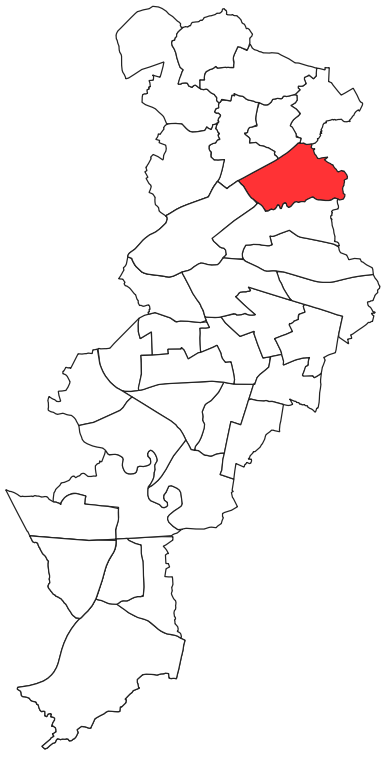
- Newton Heath ward (1994) within Manchester

- Coat of arms
- Country: United Kingdom
- Constituent country: England
- Region: North West England
- County: Greater Manchester
- Metropolitan borough: Manchester
- Created: November 1890
- Named for: Newton Heath

Government
  - Type: Unicameral
  - Body: Manchester City Council
- UK Parliamentary Constituency: Manchester Central

Newton Heath was an electoral division of Manchester City Council which was represented from 1890 until 2004. It covered the Newton Heath area of North Manchester.

== Overview ==
Newton Heath ward was created in 1890, as a result of the Manchester Extension Scheme 1890, which transferred the townships of Blackley, Crumpsall, Moston, Newton, Openshaw, and parts of Gorton to the Manchester corporation. Initially, it covered the western portion of the former Newton township, these boundaries were not affected by a city-wide boundary revision in 1919. A further boundary revision in 1950 transferred an area to the west of Ten Acres Lane to the Miles Platting ward, while another revision in 1971 transferred a part of the Bradford ward to the west of Clayton Street to the ward. In 1982, the ward's southern boundary became the River Medlock. In 2004, the ward was abolished, and its remaining area was transferred to the new Miles Platting and Newton Heath ward.

From its creation until 1918, the ward was split between the Manchester North and Manchester North East Parliamentary constituencies. From 1918 until 1955, it was part of the Manchester Clayton Parliamentary constituency. From 1955 until 1983, it was part of the Manchester Openshaw Parliamentary constituency. From 1983 until its abolition, it was part of the Manchester Central Parliamentary constituency.

== Councillors ==
Election	Councillor	Councillor	Councillor
1890	G. Evans (Lib)	W. Trevor (Lib)	J. M. Elliott (Con)
November 1890	W. T. Rothwell (Con)	W. Trevor (Lib)	J. M. Elliott (Con)
1891	W. T. Rothwell (Con)	W. Trevor (Lib)	J. Garlick (Con)
1892	W. T. Rothwell (Con)	W. Trevor (Lib)	J. Garlick (Con)
1893	W. T. Rothwell (Con)	W. Trevor (Lib)	J. Garlick (Con)
1894	W. T. Rothwell (Con)	W. Trevor (Lib)	J. Garlick (Con)
1895	W. T. Rothwell (Con)	W. Trevor (Lib)	J. Garlick (Con)
1896	W. T. Rothwell (Con)	W. Trevor (Lib)	J. Garlick (Con)
1897	W. T. Rothwell (Con)	W. Trevor (Lib)	J. Garlick (Con)
1898	W. T. Rothwell (Con)	W. Trevor (Lib)	J. Garlick (Con)
1899	W. T. Rothwell (Con)	W. Trevor (Lib)	J. Garlick (Con)
1900	W. T. Rothwell (Con)	W. Trevor (Lib)	J. Garlick (Con)
1901	W. T. Rothwell (Con)	W. Trevor (Lib)	J. Garlick (Con)
1902	W. T. Rothwell (Con)	W. Trevor (Lib)	J. Garlick (Con)
1903	W. T. Rothwell (Con)	W. Trevor (Lib)	J. Garlick (Con)
1904	W. T. Rothwell (Con)	W. Trevor (Lib)	W. Butterworth (Lib)
February 1905	W. T. Rothwell (Con)	F. J. West (Con)	W. Butterworth (Lib)
1905	J. J. Rudge (Lab)	F. J. West (Con)	W. Butterworth (Lib)
1906	J. J. Rudge (Lab)	F. J. West (Con)	W. Butterworth (Lib)
1907	J. J. Rudge (Lab)	F. J. West (Con)	W. Butterworth (Lib)
1908	J. A. Moston (Con)	F. J. West (Con)	W. Butterworth (Lib)
1909	J. A. Moston (Con)	F. J. West (Con)	W. Butterworth (Lib)
1910	J. A. Moston (Con)	F. J. West (Con)	W. Butterworth (Lib)
1911	C. W. Godbert (Lib)	F. J. West (Con)	W. Butterworth (Lib)
1912	C. W. Godbert (Lib)	F. J. West (Con)	J. A. Moston (Con)
1913	C. W. Godbert (Lib)	F. J. West (Con)	J. A. Moston (Con)
1914	C. W. Godbert (Lib)	F. J. West (Con)	J. A. Moston (Con)
1919	C. W. Godbert (Lib)	F. J. West (Con)	P. L. Martin (Lab)
1920	C. W. Godbert (Lib)	R. M. Marshall (Con)	P. L. Martin (Lab)
1921	C. W. Godbert (Lib)	R. M. Marshall (Con)	P. L. Martin (Lab)
October 1922	C. W. Godbert (Lib)	R. M. Marshall (Con)	P. L. Martin (Ind. Lab)
1922	C. W. Godbert (Lib)	R. M. Marshall (Con)	H. F. Robinson (Con)
1923	C. W. Godbert (Lib)	M. Jagger (Lab)	H. F. Robinson (Con)
1924	C. W. Godbert (Lib)	M. Jagger (Lab)	H. F. Robinson (Con)
1925	C. W. Godbert (Lib)	M. Jagger (Lab)	H. F. Robinson (Con)
1926	C. W. Godbert (Lib)	H. M. Mitchell (Lab)	H. F. Robinson (Con)
1927	C. W. Godbert (Lib)	H. M. Mitchell (Lab)	H. F. Robinson (Con)
1928	C. W. Godbert (Lib)	H. M. Mitchell (Lab)	H. F. Robinson (Con)
1929	C. W. Godbert (Lib)	H. M. Mitchell (Lab)	H. F. Robinson (Con)
1930	L. Turner (Con)	H. M. Mitchell (Lab)	H. F. Robinson (Con)
1931	L. Turner (Con)	H. M. Mitchell (Lab)	H. F. Robinson (Con)
September 1932	L. Turner (Con)	H. M. Mitchell (ILP)	H. F. Robinson (Con)
1932	L. Turner (Con)	H. M. Mitchell (ILP)	H. F. Robinson (Con)
1933	J. Young (Lab)	H. M. Mitchell (ILP)	H. F. Robinson (Con)
1934	J. Young (Lab)	H. M. Mitchell (ILP)	C. E. P. Stott (Lab)
1935	J. Young (Lab)	A. Stevenson (Lab)	C. E. P. Stott (Lab)
1936	J. Young (Lab)	A. Stevenson (Lab)	C. E. P. Stott (Lab)
1937	J. Young (Lab)	A. Stevenson (Lab)	C. E. P. Stott (Lab)
1938	J. Young (Lab)	A. Stevenson (Lab)	C. E. P. Stott (Lab)
1945	A. Eyres (Lab)	J. Hellier (Lab)	C. E. P. Stott (Lab)
1946	A. Eyres (Lab)	J. Hellier (Lab)	C. E. P. Stott (Lab)
March 1947	A. Logan (Lab)	J. Hellier (Lab)	C. E. P. Stott (Lab)
1947	A. Logan (Lab)	J. Hellier (Lab)	C. E. P. Stott (Lab)
1949	A. Logan (Lab)	J. Hellier (Lab)	C. E. P. Stott (Lab)
1950	A. Logan (Lab)	J. Hellier (Lab)	C. E. P. Stott (Lab)
1951	A. Logan (Lab)	W. Binns (Lab)	C. E. P. Stott (Lab)
1952	A. Logan (Lab)	W. Binns (Lab)	C. E. P. Stott (Lab)
1953	A. Logan (Lab)	W. Binns (Lab)	J. Bates (Lab)
1954	A. Logan (Lab)	W. Binns (Lab)	J. Bates (Lab)
1955	A. Logan (Lab)	W. Binns (Lab)	J. Bates (Lab)
September 1955	A. Logan (Lab)	W. Binns (Lab)	W. Lister (Lab)
1956	A. Logan (Lab)	W. Binns (Lab)	W. Lister (Lab)
1957	A. Logan (Lab)	W. Binns (Lab)	W. Lister (Lab)
1958	A. Logan (Lab)	W. Binns (Lab)	W. Lister (Lab)
1959	A. Logan (Lab)	W. Binns (Lab)	W. Lister (Lab)
1960	A. Logan (Lab)	W. Binns (Lab)	W. Lister (Lab)
1961	A. Logan (Lab)	W. Binns (Lab)	W. Lister (Lab)
1962	A. Logan (Lab)	W. Binns (Lab)	W. Lister (Lab)
1963	A. Logan (Lab)	T. C. Jones (Lab)	W. Lister (Lab)
1964	A. Logan (Lab)	T. C. Jones (Lab)	W. Lister (Lab)
September 1964	M. Johnson (Lab)	T. C. Jones (Lab)	W. Lister (Lab)
1965	M. Johnson (Lab)	T. C. Jones (Lab)	C. Tomlinson (Lab)
1966	M. Johnson (Lab)	R. B. Prain (Lab)	C. Tomlinson (Lab)
1967	K. E. Goulding (Con)	R. B. Prain (Lab)	C. Tomlinson (Lab)
1968	K. E. Goulding (Con)	R. B. Prain (Lab)	J. Foran (Con)
1969	K. E. Goulding (Con)	C. Tomlinson (Lab)	J. Foran (Con)
September 1969	K. E. Goulding (Con)	C. Tomlinson (Lab)	H. W. Bliss (Lab)
1970	M. J. Taylor (Lab)	C. Tomlinson (Lab)	H. W. Bliss (Lab)
1971	M. J. Taylor (Lab)	C. Tomlinson (Lab)	J. Smith (Lab)
1972	M. J. Taylor (Lab)	C. Tomlinson (Lab)	J. Smith (Lab)
1973	M. J. Taylor (Lab)	C. Tomlinson (Lab)	J. Smith (Lab)
1975	M. J. Taylor (Lab)	C. Tomlinson (Lab)	J. Smith (Lab)
1976	M. J. Taylor (Lab)	C. Tomlinson (Lab)	J. Smith (Lab)
1978	M. J. Taylor (Lab)	C. Tomlinson (Lab)	J. Smith (Lab)
1979	M. J. Taylor (Lab)	C. Tomlinson (Lab)	J. Smith (Lab)
1980	M. J. Taylor (Lab)	C. Tomlinson (Lab)	J. Smith (Lab)
1982	C. Tomlinson (Lab)	J. Smith (Lab)	M. J. Taylor (Lab)
1983	C. Tomlinson (Lab)	J. Smith (Lab)	M. J. Taylor (Lab)
1984	C. Tomlinson (Lab)	J. Smith (Lab)	M. J. Taylor (Lab)
1986	C. Tomlinson (Lab)	J. Smith (Lab)	M. J. Taylor (Lab)
1987	C. Tomlinson (Lab)	J. Smith (Lab)	A. Wood (Lab)
1988	A. F. Garside (Lab)	J. Smith (Lab)	A. Wood (Lab)
1990	A. F. Garside (Lab)	J. Smith (Lab)	A. Wood (Lab)
1991	A. F. Garside (Lab)	J. Smith (Lab)	D. Rathbone (Lab)
1992	A. F. Garside (Lab)	J. Smith (Lab)	D. Rathbone (Lab)
1994	A. F. Garside (Lab)	J. Smith (Lab)	D. Rathbone (Lab)
1995	A. F. Garside (Lab)	J. Smith (Lab)	D. O'Connor (Lab)
1996	A. F. Garside (Lab)	J. Smith (Lab)	D. O'Connor (Lab)
1998	M. Smitheman (Lab)	J. Smith (Lab)	D. O'Connor (Lab)
1999	M. Smitheman (Lab)	J. Smith (Lab)	D. O'Connor (Lab)
2000	M. Smitheman (Lab)	C. Carroll (Lab)	D. O'Connor (Lab)
June 2000	M. Smitheman (Lab)	C. Carroll (Lab)	D. O'Connor (Ind. Lab)
2002	J. Hitchen (Lab)	C. Carroll (Lab)	D. O'Connor (Ind. Lab)
2003	J. Hitchen (Lab)	C. Carroll (Lab)	R. Wilson (Lab)
February 2004	J. Hitchen (Lab)	C. Carroll (Lab)	R. Wilson (Lib Dem)

== Elections ==
=== Elections in 1890s ===
==== November 1890 ====
1890 (3 vacancies)
Party	Candidate	Votes	%	±%
Liberal	G. Evans	1,167	54.3	
Liberal	W. Trevor	1,153	53.7	
Conservative	J. M. Elliott	1,124	52.3	
Liberal	R. Brown	1,063	49.5	
Conservative	J. Garlick	982	45.7	
Conservative	T. Milnes	956	44.5	
Majority		61	2.8	
Turnout		2,148		
Liberal win (new seat)				
Liberal win (new seat)				
Conservative win (new seat)				

==== November 1890 (by-election) ====
By-election: 30 November 1890
Party	Candidate	Votes	%	±%
Conservative	W. T. Rothwell	1,239	56.1	+3.8
Liberal	R. Brown	969	43.9	−10.4
Majority		270	12.2	+9.4
Turnout		2,208		
Conservative gain from Liberal		Swing		

==== November 1891 ====
1891
Party	Candidate	Votes	%	±%
Conservative	J. Garlick*	1,160	50.2	−2.1
Liberal	R. M. Berrie	1,150	49.8	−4.5
Majority		10	0.4	−2.4
Turnout		2,310		
Conservative hold		Swing		

==== November 1892 ====
1892
Party	Candidate	Votes	%	±%
Liberal	W. Trevor*	uncontested		
Liberal hold		Swing		

==== November 1893 ====
1893
Party	Candidate	Votes	%	±%
Conservative	W. T. Rothwell*	1,196	73.6	N/A
Ind. Labour Party	G. G. Beresford	428	26.4	N/A
Majority		768	47.2	N/A
Turnout		1,624		
Conservative hold		Swing		

==== November 1894 ====
1894
Party	Candidate	Votes	%	±%
Conservative	J. Garlick*	1,241	55.9	−17.7
Liberal	G. Evans	981	44.1	N/A
Majority		260	11.8	−35.4
Turnout		2,222		
Conservative hold		Swing		

==== November 1895 ====
1895
Party	Candidate	Votes	%	±%
Liberal	W. Trevor*	uncontested		
Liberal hold		Swing		

==== November 1896 ====
1896
Party	Candidate	Votes	%	±%
Conservative	W. T. Rothwell*	1,343	72.5	N/A
Ind. Labour Party	A. Mear	509	27.5	N/A
Majority		834	45.0	N/A
Turnout		1,852		
Conservative hold		Swing		

==== November 1897 ====
1897
Party	Candidate	Votes	%	±%
Conservative	J. Garlick*	uncontested		
Conservative hold		Swing		

==== November 1898 ====
1898
Party	Candidate	Votes	%	±%
Liberal	W. Trevor*	uncontested		
Liberal hold		Swing		

==== November 1899 ====
1899
Party	Candidate	Votes	%	±%
Conservative	W. T. Rothwell*	uncontested		
Conservative hold		Swing		

=== Elections in 1900s ===
==== November 1900 ====
1900
Party	Candidate	Votes	%	±%
Conservative	J. Garlick*	uncontested		
Conservative hold		Swing		

==== November 1901 ====
1901
Party	Candidate	Votes	%	±%
Liberal	W. Trevor*	uncontested		
Liberal hold		Swing		

==== November 1902 ====
1902
Party	Candidate	Votes	%	±%
Conservative	W. T. Rothwell*	uncontested		
Conservative hold		Swing		

==== November 1903 ====
1903
Party	Candidate	Votes	%	±%
Conservative	J. Garlick*	uncontested		
Conservative hold		Swing		

==== November 1904 ====
1904
Party	Candidate	Votes	%	±%
Liberal	W. Trevor*	uncontested		
Liberal hold		Swing		

==== February 1905 (by-election) ====
By-election: 14 February 1905
Party	Candidate	Votes	%	±%
Conservative	F. J. West	1,130	43.4	N/A
Labour	J. J. Rudge	902	34.7	N/A
Liberal	F. T. T. Reynolds	570	21.9	N/A
Majority		228	8.7	N/A
Turnout		2,602		
Conservative gain from Liberal		Swing		

==== November 1905 ====
1905
Party	Candidate	Votes	%	±%
Labour	J. J. Rudge	1,299	51.1	N/A
Conservative	E. J. Churchman	1,244	48.9	N/A
Majority		55	2.2	N/A
Turnout		2,543		
Labour gain from Conservative		Swing		

==== November 1906 ====
1906
Party	Candidate	Votes	%	±%
Liberal	W. Butterworth*	1,147	50.5	N/A
Labour	J. D. Sutcliffe	1,124	49.5	−1.6
Majority		23	1.0	
Turnout		2,271		
Liberal hold		Swing		

==== November 1907 ====
1907
Party	Candidate	Votes	%	±%
Conservative	F. J. West*	1,645	63.9	N/A
Labour	T. Fox	928	36.1	−13.4
Majority		717	27.8	
Turnout		2,573		
Conservative hold		Swing		

==== November 1908 ====
1908
Party	Candidate	Votes	%	±%
Conservative	J. A. Moston	1,598	61.1	−2.8
Labour	R. Robinson	1,018	38.9	+2.8
Majority		580	22.2	−5.6
Turnout		2,616		
Conservative gain from Labour		Swing		

==== November 1909 ====
1909
Party	Candidate	Votes	%	±%
Liberal	W. Butterworth*	uncontested		
Liberal hold		Swing		

=== Elections in 1910s ===
==== November 1910 ====
1910
Party	Candidate	Votes	%	±%
Conservative	F. J. West*	uncontested		
Conservative hold		Swing		

==== November 1911 ====
1911
Party	Candidate	Votes	%	±%
Liberal	C. W. Godbert	1,417	50.9	N/A
Conservative	J. A. Moston*	1,367	49.1	N/A
Majority		50	1.8	N/A
Turnout		2,784		
Liberal gain from Conservative		Swing		

==== November 1912 ====
1912
Party	Candidate	Votes	%	±%
Conservative	J. A. Moston	1,630	55.7	+6.6
Liberal	W. Butterworth*	1,297	44.3	−6.6
Majority		333	11.4	
Turnout		2,927		
Conservative gain from Liberal		Swing		

==== November 1913 ====
1913
Party	Candidate	Votes	%	±%
Conservative	F. J. West*	uncontested		
Conservative hold		Swing		

==== November 1914 ====
1914
Party	Candidate	Votes	%	±%
Liberal	C. W. Godbert*	uncontested		
Liberal hold		Swing		

==== November 1919 ====
1919 (new boundaries)
Party	Candidate	Votes	%	±%
Labour	P. L. Martin	2,119	64.9	
Conservative	J. Goodwin	1,147	35.1	
Majority		972	29.8	
Turnout		3,266	41.3	
Labour gain from Conservative		Swing		

=== Elections in 1920s ===
==== November 1920 ====
1920
Party	Candidate	Votes	%	±%
Conservative	R. M. Marshall	3,220	63.5	+28.4
Labour	I. Floyd	1,847	36.5	−28.4
Majority		1,373	27.0	
Turnout		5,067	64.3	+23.0
Conservative hold		Swing		

==== November 1921 ====
1921
Party	Candidate	Votes	%	±%
Liberal	C. W. Godbert*	2,743	59.2	N/A
Labour	H. Thorneycroft	1,890	40.8	+3.9
Majority		853	18.4	
Turnout		5,067	58.1	−6.2
Liberal hold		Swing		

==== November 1922 ====
1922
Party	Candidate	Votes	%	±%
Conservative	H. F. Robinson	2,083	43.5	N/A
Labour	H. Thorneycroft	1,938	40.5	−0.3
Independent Labour	P. L. Martin*	763	15.9	N/A
Majority		145	3.0	
Turnout		4,784	59.6	+1.6
Conservative gain from Independent Labour		Swing		

==== November 1923 ====
1923
Party	Candidate	Votes	%	±%
Labour	M. Jagger	2,555	56.9	+16.4
Conservative	W. Stephenson	1,932	43.1	−0.4
Majority		623	13.8	
Turnout		4,487		
Labour gain from Conservative		Swing		

==== November 1924 ====
1924
Party	Candidate	Votes	%	±%
Liberal	C. W. Godbert*	3,358	61.6	N/A
Labour	H. Frankland	2,091	38.4	−18.5
Majority		1,267	23.2	
Turnout		5,449		
Liberal hold		Swing		

==== November 1925 ====
1925
Party	Candidate	Votes	%	±%
Conservative	H. F. Robinson*	2,905	50.3	N/A
Labour	H. Frankland	2,866	49.7	+11.3
Majority		39	0.6	
Turnout		5,771	62.7	
Conservative hold		Swing		

==== November 1926 ====
1926
Party	Candidate	Votes	%	±%
Labour	H. M. Mitchell*	3,061	57.0	+7.3
Conservative	J. Fildes	2,309	43.0	−7.3
Majority		752	14.0	
Turnout		5,370	60.4	−2.3
Labour hold		Swing		

==== November 1927 ====
1927
Party	Candidate	Votes	%	±%
Liberal	C. W. Godbert*	3,179	61.1	N/A
Labour	W. N. Bayes	2,028	39.9	−18.1
Majority		1,151	22.2	
Turnout		5,207	54.9	−5.5
Liberal hold		Swing		

==== November 1928 ====
1928
Party	Candidate	Votes	%	±%
Conservative	H. F. Robinson*	2,855	50.7	N/A
Labour	A. N. Dooley	2,746	48.7	+8.8
Residents	J. A. P. Holmes	33	0.6	N/A
Majority		109	2.0	
Turnout		5,634	59.8	+4.9
Conservative hold		Swing		

==== November 1929 ====
1929
Party	Candidate	Votes	%	±%
Labour	H. M. Mitchell*	2,349	52.5	+3.8
Conservative	L. Turner	2,128	47.5	−3.2
Majority		221	5.0	
Turnout		4,477	44.2	−15.6
Labour hold		Swing		

=== Elections in 1930s ===
==== November 1930 ====
1930
Party	Candidate	Votes	%	±%
Conservative	L. Turner	2,599	55.8	+8.3
Labour	B. Clare	2,062	44.2	−8.3
Majority		537	11.6	
Turnout		4,661		
Conservative gain from Liberal		Swing		

==== November 1931 ====
1931
Party	Candidate	Votes	%	±%
Conservative	H. F. Robinson*	3,293	61.6	+5.8
Labour	J. Gorman	2,049	38.4	−5.8
Majority		1,244	23.2	+11.6
Turnout		5,342	52.6	
Conservative hold		Swing		

==== November 1932 ====
1932
Party	Candidate	Votes	%	±%
Ind. Labour Party	H. M. Mitchell*	2,983	60.3	N/A
Conservative	J. Fildes	1,960	39.7	−21.9
Majority		1,023	20.6	
Turnout		4,943		
Ind. Labour Party hold		Swing		

==== November 1933 ====
1933
Party	Candidate	Votes	%	±%
Labour	J. Young	2,940	57.2	−3.7
Conservative	L. Turner*	2,202	42.8	+3.1
Majority		738	14.4	−6.2
Turnout		5,142		
Labour gain from Conservative		Swing		

==== November 1934 ====
1934
Party	Candidate	Votes	%	±%
Labour	C. E. P. Stott	2,632	51.9	−5.3
Conservative	H. F. Robinson*	2,437	48.1	+5.3
Majority		195	3.8	−10.6
Turnout		5,069		
Labour gain from Conservative		Swing		

==== November 1935 ====
1935
Party	Candidate	Votes	%	±%
Labour	A. Stevenson	2,878	53.0	+1.1
Conservative	A. Brember	2,553	47.0	−1.1
Majority		325	6.0	+2.2
Turnout		5,431		
Labour gain from Ind. Labour Party		Swing		

==== November 1936 ====
1936
Party	Candidate	Votes	%	±%
Labour	J. Young*	uncontested		
Labour hold		Swing		

==== November 1937 ====
1937
Party	Candidate	Votes	%	±%
Labour	C. E. P. Stott*	2,495	56.3	N/A
Conservative	H. Poulter	1,936	43.7	N/A
Majority		559	12.6	N/A
Turnout		4,431		
Labour hold		Swing		

==== November 1938 ====
1938
Party	Candidate	Votes	%	±%
Labour	A. Stevenson*	3,086	53.6	−2.7
Conservative	F. M. Grime	2,671	46.4	+2.7
Majority		415	7.2	−5.4
Turnout		5,757		
Labour hold		Swing		

=== Elections in 1940s ===
==== November 1945 ====
1945 (2 vacancies)
Party	Candidate	Votes	%	±%
Labour	A. Eyres	3,743	65.2	+11.6
Labour	J. Hellier*	3,708	64.6	+11.0
Conservative	W. H. Priestnall	1,999	34.8	−11.6
Conservative	A. Turner	1,936	33.7	−12.7
Majority		1,709	29.8	+22.6
Turnout		5,742	37.2	
Labour hold		Swing		
Labour hold		Swing		

==== November 1946 ====
1946
Party	Candidate	Votes	%	±%
Labour	C. E. P. Stott*	3,213	59.3	−5.9
Conservative	W. H. Priestnall	2,207	40.7	+5.9
Majority		1,006	18.6	−11.2
Turnout		5,420		
Labour hold		Swing		

==== March 1947 (by-election) ====
By-election: 26 March 1947
Party	Candidate	Votes	%	±%
Labour	A. Logan	3,328	50.8	−8.5
Conservative	W. H. Priestnall	3,226	49.2	+8.5
Majority		102	1.6	−17.0
Turnout		6,554		
Labour hold		Swing		

==== November 1947 ====
1947
Party	Candidate	Votes	%	±%
Labour	J. Hellier*	4,582	52.6	−6.7
Conservative	W. H. Priestnall	4,122	47.4	+6.7
Majority		460	5.2	−13.4
Turnout		8,704		
Labour hold		Swing		

==== May 1949 ====
1949
Party	Candidate	Votes	%	±%
Labour	A. Logan*	4,969	56.5	+3.9
Conservative	E. Hatch	3,833	43.5	−3.9
Majority		1,136	13.0	+7.8
Turnout		8,802		
Labour hold		Swing		

=== Elections in 1950s ===
==== May 1950 ====
1950 (new boundaries)
Party	Candidate	Votes	%	±%
Labour	C. E. P. Stott*	3,177	59.6	
Conservative	W. H. Priestnall	2,153	40.4	
Majority		1,024	19.2	
Turnout		5,330		
Labour hold		Swing		

==== May 1951 ====
1951
Party	Candidate	Votes	%	±%
Labour	W. Binns*	3,268	55.3	−4.3
Conservative	W. H. Priestnall	2,644	44.7	+4.3
Majority		624	10.6	−8.6
Turnout		5,912		
Labour hold		Swing		

==== May 1952 ====
1952
Party	Candidate	Votes	%	±%
Labour	A. Logan*	4,319	69.6	+14.3
Conservative	W. H. Priestnall	1,886	30.4	−14.3
Majority		2,433	39.2	+28.6
Turnout		6,205		
Labour hold		Swing		

==== May 1953 ====
1953
Party	Candidate	Votes	%	±%
Labour	J. Bates	3,375	66.8	−2.8
Conservative	W. H. Priestnall	1,679	33.2	+2.8
Majority		1,696	33.6	−5.6
Turnout		5,054		
Labour hold		Swing		

==== May 1954 ====
1954
Party	Candidate	Votes	%	±%
Labour	W. Binns*	2,936	68.1	+1.3
Conservative	W. H. Priestnall	1,377	31.9	−1.3
Majority		1,559	36.2	+2.6
Turnout		4,313		
Labour hold		Swing		

==== May 1955 ====
1955
Party	Candidate	Votes	%	±%
Labour	A. Logan*	2,732	63.8	−4.3
Conservative	J. E. Anderson	1,550	36.2	+4.3
Majority		1,182	27.6	−8.6
Turnout		4,282		
Labour hold		Swing		

==== September 1955 (by-election) ====
By-election: 22 September 1955
Party	Candidate	Votes	%	±%
Labour	W. Lister	2,057	64.3	+0.5
Conservative	J. E. Anderson	1,142	35.7	−0.5
Majority		915	28.6	+1.0
Turnout		3,199		
Labour hold		Swing		

==== May 1956 ====
1956
Party	Candidate	Votes	%	±%
Labour	W. Lister*	2,437	69.4	+5.6
Conservative	F. H. Robinson	1,072	30.6	−5.6
Majority		1,365	38.8	+11.2
Turnout		3,509		
Labour hold		Swing		

==== May 1957 ====
1957
Party	Candidate	Votes	%	±%
Labour	W. Binns*	2,698	71.8	+2.3
Conservative	E. Collingwood	1,062	28.2	−2.3
Majority		1,636	43.6	+4.6
Turnout		3,760		
Labour hold		Swing		

==== May 1958 ====
1958
Party	Candidate	Votes	%	±%
Labour	A. Logan*	2,660	70.5	−1.3
Conservative	A. Johnson	1,112	29.5	+1.3
Majority		1,548	41.0	−2.6
Turnout		3,772		
Labour hold		Swing		

==== May 1959 ====
1959
Party	Candidate	Votes	%	±%
Labour	W. Lister*	2,275	58.2	−12.3
Conservative	A. Johnson	1,631	41.8	+12.3
Majority		644	16.4	−24.6
Turnout		3,906		
Labour hold		Swing		

=== Elections in 1960s ===
==== May 1960 ====
1960
Party	Candidate	Votes	%	±%
Labour	W. Binns*	1,829	53.7	−4.5
Conservative	R. Thorpe	1,580	46.3	+4.5
Majority		249	7.4	−9.0
Turnout		3,409		
Labour hold		Swing		

==== May 1961 ====
1961
Party	Candidate	Votes	%	±%
Labour	A. Logan*	2,160	55.5	+1.8
Conservative	R. Thorpe	1,642	42.2	−4.1
Communist	J. A. Day	92	2.3	N/A
Majority		518	13.3	+5.9
Turnout		3,894		
Labour hold		Swing		

==== May 1962 ====
1962
Party	Candidate	Votes	%	±%
Labour	W. Lister*	2,219	66.1	+10.6
Conservative	K. A. Edis	1,038	30.9	−11.3
Union Movement	C. Gee	98	3.0	N/A
Majority		1,181	35.2	+21.9
Turnout		3,355		
Labour hold		Swing		

==== May 1963 ====
1963
Party	Candidate	Votes	%	±%
Labour	T. C. Jones	2,111	51.7	−14.4
Liberal	R. Jackson	986	24.1	N/A
Conservative	E. A. Walmsley	890	21.8	−9.1
Communist	J. B. Cross	100	2.4	N/A
Majority		1,125	27.6	−7.6
Turnout		4,087		
Labour hold		Swing		

==== May 1964 ====
1964
Party	Candidate	Votes	%	±%
Labour	A. Logan*	2,075	64.9	+13.2
Conservative	P. B. Walker	584	18.3	−3.5
Liberal	R. Jackson	426	13.3	−10.8
Communist	J. B. Cross	113	3.5	+1.1
Majority		1,491	46.6	+19.0
Turnout		3,198		
Labour hold		Swing		

==== September 1964 (by-election) ====
By-election: 17 September 1964
Party	Candidate	Votes	%	±%
Labour	M. Johnson	1,356	59.8	−5.1
Conservative	P. B. Walker	823	36.3	+18.0
Communist	J. B. Cross	90	3.9	+0.4
Majority		533	23.5	−23.1
Turnout		2,269		
Labour hold		Swing		

==== May 1965 ====
1965
Party	Candidate	Votes	%	±%
Labour	C. Tomlinson	1,429	52.9	−12.0
Conservative	K. E. Goulding	1,137	42.1	+23.8
Communist	J. B. Cross	133	5.0	+1.5
Majority		292	10.8	−35.8
Turnout		2,699		
Labour hold		Swing		

==== May 1966 ====
1966
Party	Candidate	Votes	%	±%
Labour	R. B. Prain	1,523	59.5	+6.6
Conservative	K. E. Goulding	934	36.5	−5.6
Communist	J. B. Cross	101	4.0	−1.0
Majority		589	23.0	+12.2
Turnout		2,558		
Labour hold		Swing		

==== May 1967 ====
1967
Party	Candidate	Votes	%	±%
Conservative	K. E. Goulding	1,454	53.0	+16.5
Labour	M. Johnson*	1,130	41.2	−18.3
Independent	A. E. Walsh	157	5.8	N/A
Majority		324	11.8	
Turnout		2,741		
Conservative gain from Labour		Swing		

==== May 1968 ====
1968
Party	Candidate	Votes	%	±%
Conservative	J. Foran	1,510	46.7	−6.3
Labour	C. Tomlinson*	1,452	44.9	+3.7
Liberal	R. Jackson	272	8.4	N/A
Majority		58	1.8	−10.0
Turnout		3,234		
Conservative gain from Labour		Swing		

==== May 1969 ====
1969
Party	Candidate	Votes	%	±%
Labour	C. Tomlinson	1,900	53.1	+8.2
Conservative	J. Coleclough	1,584	44.3	−2.4
Communist	R. Jackson	94	2.6	N/A
Majority		316	8.8	
Turnout		3,578		
Labour hold		Swing		

==== September 1969 (by-election) ====
By-election: 18 September 1969
Party	Candidate	Votes	%	±%
Labour	H. W. Bliss	1,730	57.9	+4.8
Conservative	W. Ash	1,193	39.9	−4.4
Communist	P. Cole	64	2.2	−0.4
Majority		537	18.0	+9.2
Turnout		2,987		
Labour gain from Conservative		Swing		

=== Elections in 1970s ===
==== May 1970 ====
1970
Party	Candidate	Votes	%	±%
Labour	M. J. Taylor	2,220	60.4	+7.3
Conservative	K. E. Goulding*	1,413	38.4	−5.9
Communist	R. Fisher	44	1.2	−1.4
Majority		807	22.0	+13.2
Turnout		3,677		
Labour gain from Conservative		Swing		

==== May 1971 ====
1971 (3 vacancies; new boundaries)
Party	Candidate	Votes	%	±%
Labour	M. J. Taylor*	3,716	76.1	
Labour	C. Tomlinson*	3,696	75.7	
Labour	J. Smith	3,374	69.1	
Conservative	A. E. Walsh	1,293	26.5	
Conservative	H. Ryan	1,218	24.9	
Conservative	J. McCabe	1,176	24.1	
Communist	J. B. Cross	172	3.5	
Majority		2,081	42.6	
Turnout		4,882		
Labour win (new seat)				
Labour win (new seat)				
Labour win (new seat)				

==== May 1972 ====
1972
Party	Candidate	Votes	%	±%
Labour	J. Smith*	2,234	62.6	−13.5
Conservative	A. E. Walsh	1,337	37.4	+10.9
Majority		897	25.2	−17.4
Turnout		3,571		
Labour hold		Swing		

==== May 1973 ====
1973 (3 vacancies; reorganisation)
Party	Candidate	Votes	%	±%
Labour	M. J. Taylor*	1,914	60.1	−2.5
Labour	C. Tomlinson*	1,902	59.7	−2.9
Labour	J. Smith*	1,826	57.3	−5.3
Conservative	A. E. Walsh	1,148	36.0	−1.4
Conservative	A. R. Leeke	1,080	33.9	−3.5
Conservative	T. B. Hegarty	1,060	33.3	−4.1
Majority		678	21.3	−3.9
Turnout		3,184		
Labour hold		Swing		
Labour hold		Swing		
Labour hold		Swing		

==== May 1975 ====
1975
Party	Candidate	Votes	%	±%
Labour	J. Smith*	1,449	53.9	−8.6
Conservative	A. Bonson	1,240	46.1	+8.6
Majority		209	7.8	−17.2
Turnout		2,689		
Labour hold		Swing	-8.6	

==== May 1976 ====
1976
Party	Candidate	Votes	%	±%
Labour	C. Tomlinson*	1,819	49.0	−4.9
Conservative	L. Clarke	1,794	48.3	+2.2
Liberal	R. Cowe	101	2.7	+2.7
Majority		25	0.7	−7.1
Turnout		3,714		
Labour hold		Swing	-3.5	

==== May 1978 ====
1978
Party	Candidate	Votes	%	±%
Labour	M. J. Taylor*	2,165	57.0	+8.0
Conservative	L. Clarke	1,636	43.0	−5.3
Majority		529	14.0	+13.3
Turnout		3,801	39.2	
Labour hold		Swing	+6.6	

==== May 1979 ====
1979
Party	Candidate	Votes	%	±%
Labour	J. Smith*	4,209	60.4	+3.4
Conservative	D. Booth	2,499	35.9	−7.1
Liberal	V. Towers	258	3.7	+3.7
Majority		1,710	24.5	+10.6
Turnout		6,966	70.4	+31.2
Labour hold		Swing	+5.2	

=== Elections in 1980s ===
==== May 1980 ====
1980
Party	Candidate	Votes	%	±%
Labour	C. Tomlinson*	2,549	64.4	+4.0
Conservative	A. E. Walsh	1,190	30.1	−5.8
Liberal	V. Towers	221	5.6	+1.9
Majority		1,359	34.3	+9.8
Turnout		3,960	38.4	−32.0
Labour hold		Swing	+4.9	

==== May 1982 ====
1982 (3 vacancies; new boundaries)
Party	Candidate	Votes	%	±%
Labour	Clifford Tomlinson*	1,933	58.0	
Labour	John Smith*	1,925	57.8	
Labour	Michael Taylor*	1,875	56.3	
Conservative	David Booth	755	22.7	
Conservative	Stephen Johnson	672	20.2	
Conservative	Kenneth Leeson	616	18.5	
Liberal	Joyce Laslett	389	11.7	
Liberal	Vera Towers	352	10.6	
Liberal	Geoffrey Mawson	344	10.3	
Majority		1,120	33.6	
Turnout		3,332	33.8	
Labour win (new seat)				
Labour win (new seat)				
Labour win (new seat)				

==== May 1983 ====
1983
Party	Candidate	Votes	%	±%
Labour	Michael Taylor*	2,480	67.2	+4.4
Conservative	Stephen Johnson	880	23.8	−0.7
Liberal	Vera Towers	286	7.8	−4.9
National Front	Bryan Nylan	44	1.2	+1.2
Majority		1,600	43.4	+5.1
Turnout		3,690		
Labour hold		Swing	+2.5	

==== May 1984 ====
1984
Party	Candidate	Votes	%	±%
Labour	John Smith*	2,293	73.4	+6.2
Conservative	R. Driver	535	17.1	−6.7
Liberal	M. Clune	203	6.5	−1.3
National Front	Bryan Nylan	95	3.0	+1.8
Majority		1,758	56.2	+12.8
Turnout		3,126		
Labour hold		Swing	+6.4	

==== May 1986 ====
1986
Party	Candidate	Votes	%	±%
Labour	C. Tomlinson*	2,249	73.7	+0.3
Conservative	G. Heathcote	545	17.9	+0.8
Liberal	D. Rea	204	6.7	+0.2
National Front	A. Coles	52	1.7	−1.3
Majority		1,704	55.9	−0.3
Turnout		3,050		
Labour hold		Swing	-0.2	

==== May 1987 ====
1987
Party	Candidate	Votes	%	±%
Labour	Alan Wood	1,977	56.2	−17.5
Conservative	Jacqueline Hughes	854	24.3	+6.4
Liberal	Vera Towers	685	19.5	+12.8
Majority		1,123	31.9	−24.0
Turnout		3,516		
Labour hold		Swing	-11.9	

==== May 1988 ====
1988 (2 vacancies)
Party	Candidate	Votes	%	±%
Labour	J. Smith*	2,197	74.0	+17.8
Labour	A. F. Garside	2,133		
Conservative	R. J. Merrin	585	19.7	−4.6
Conservative	S. W. Place	538		
SLD	G. Shaw	186	6.3	−13.2
SLD	J. A. Snellwood	177		
Majority		1,548	54.3	+22.4
Turnout		2,968		
Labour hold		Swing		
Labour hold		Swing	+11.2	

=== Elections in 1990s ===
==== May 1990 ====
1990
Party	Candidate	Votes	%	±%
Labour	A. F. Garside*	2,753	77.0	+3.0
Conservative	R. J. Merrin	453	12.7	−7.0
Liberal Democrats	C. W. Turner	208	5.8	−0.5
Green	M. B. Bold	162	4.5	+4.5
Majority		2,300	64.3	+10.0
Turnout		3,576		
Labour hold		Swing	+5.0	

==== May 1991 ====
1991
Party	Candidate	Votes	%	±%
Labour	D. Rathbone	1,820	64.0	−13.0
Conservative	R. Caddick	559	19.6	+6.9
Liberal Democrats	K. W. Wadsworth	353	12.4	+6.6
Green	S. Boulton	113	4.0	−0.5
Majority		1,261	44.3	−20.0
Turnout		2,845	30.2	
Labour hold		Swing	-9.9	

==== May 1992 ====
1992
Party	Candidate	Votes	%	±%
Labour	J. Smith*	1,153	63.6	−0.4
Conservative	P. Leach	469	25.9	+6.3
Liberal Democrats	C. Turner	192	10.6	−1.8
Majority		684	37.7	−6.6
Turnout		1,814		
Labour hold		Swing	-3.3	

==== May 1994 ====
1994
Party	Candidate	Votes	%	±%
Labour	A. Garside*	1,655	73.5	+9.9
Liberal Democrats	C. Turner	302	13.4	+2.8
Conservative	P. Leach	294	13.1	−12.8
Majority		1,353	60.1	+22.4
Turnout		2,251		
Labour hold		Swing	+3.5	

==== May 1995 ====
1995
Party	Candidate	Votes	%	±%
Labour	Damien O'Connor	1,867	83.0	+9.5
Conservative	E. Fisher	212	9.4	−3.7
Liberal Democrats	C. Turner	140	6.2	−7.2
Independent	H. Routh	31	1.4	+1.4
Majority		1,655	73.6	+13.5
Turnout		2,250		
Labour hold		Swing	+6.6	

==== May 1996 ====
1996
Party	Candidate	Votes	%	±%
Labour	John Smith*	1,349	80.2	−2.8
Conservative	E. Fisher	169	10.0	+0.6
Liberal Democrats	C. Turner	118	7.0	+0.8
Green	P. Brown	47	2.8	+2.8
Majority		1,180	70.1	−3.5
Turnout		1,683		
Labour hold		Swing	-1.7	

==== May 1998 ====
1998
Party	Candidate	Votes	%	±%
Labour	Mathis Smitheman	1,051	80.4	+0.2
Conservative	Raymond Wattenbach	132	10.1	−0.1
Liberal Democrats	Barbera McKay	124	9.5	+2.5
Majority		919	70.3	+0.2
Turnout		1,307		
Labour hold		Swing	+0.1	

==== May 1999 ====
1999
Party	Candidate	Votes	%	±%
Labour	Damien O'Connor*	1,126	78.6	−1.8
Conservative	Raymond Wattenbach	137	9.6	−0.5
Liberal Democrats	Ann Rodgers	135	9.4	−0.1
Green	Cae Gests	35	2.4	+2.4
Majority		989	69.0	−1.3
Turnout		1,433	17.5	
Labour hold		Swing	-0.6	

=== Elections in 2000s ===
==== May 2000 ====
2000
Party	Candidate	Votes	%	±%
Labour	Christine Carroll	836	70.3	−8.3
Conservative	Albert Walsh	191	16.1	+6.5
Liberal Democrats	Ann Rodgers	115	9.7	+0.3
Green	Rachel Harper	47	4.0	+1.6
Majority		645	54.2	−14.8
Turnout		1,189	15.0	−2.5
Labour hold		Swing	-7.4	

==== May 2002 ====
2002
Party	Candidate	Votes	%	±%
Labour	June Hitchen	975	50.3	−20.0
Independent Labour	Stephen Cooper	546	28.1	+28.1
Conservative	Albert Walsh	210	10.8	−5.3
Liberal Democrats	Ann Rodgers	133	6.9	−2.8
Green	Rachel Harper	76	3.9	−0.1
Majority		429	22.1	−32.1
Turnout		1,940	23.0	+8.0
Labour hold		Swing	-24.0	

==== May 2003 ====
2003
Party	Candidate	Votes	%	±%
Labour	Richard Wilson	774	38.7	−11.6
Independent Labour	Damien O'Connor*	729	36.5	+36.5
BNP	Derek Adams	219	11.0	+11.0
Conservative	Albert Walsh	162	8.1	−2.7
Liberal Democrats	Derrick Mellor	71	3.6	−3.3
Green	Rachel Harper	44	2.2	−1.7
Majority		45	2.3	−19.8
Turnout		1,999	24.9	+1.9
Labour gain from Independent Labour		Swing	-24.0	

== See also ==
- Manchester City Council
- Manchester City Council elections
