= 1891 Manchester City Council election =

Local election in Manchester

- 2 November 1891

26 of 104 seats to Manchester City Council 53 seats needed for a majority
	First party	Second party	Third party
Party	Liberal	Conservative	Liberal Unionist
Last election	23 seats, 52.1%	16 seats, 47.1%	1 seats, 0.0%
Seats before	49	45	10
Seats won	7	15	4
Seats after	49	45	10
Seat change	Steady	Steady	Steady
Popular vote	9,473	11,212	526
Percentage	43.7%	51.8%	2.4%
Swing	▼8.4%	▲4.7%	▲2.4%
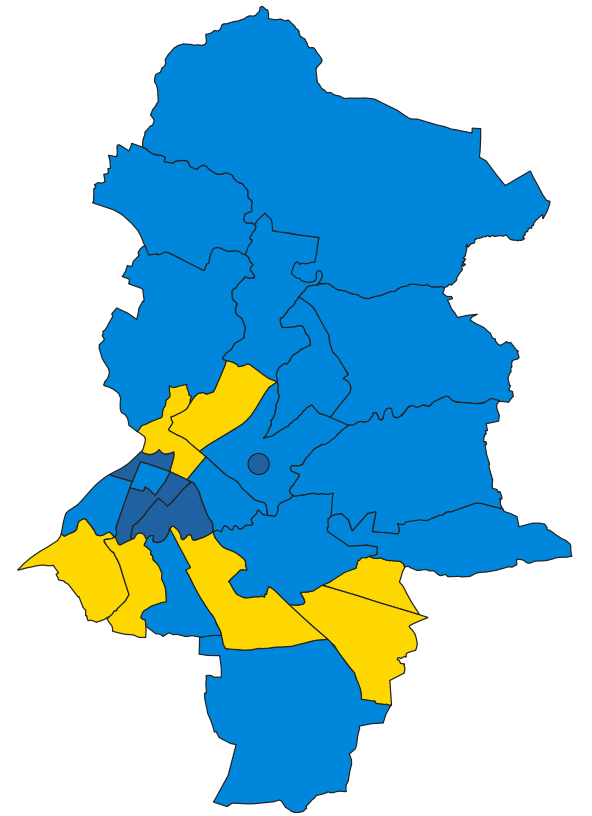
- Map of results of 1891 election
Leader of the Council before election
No overall control
Leader of the Council after election
No overall control

Elections to the Manchester City Council were held on Monday, 2 November 1891. One third of the councillors seats were up for election, with each successful candidate to serve a three-year term of office. The council remained under no overall control.

== Election result ==
Party	Votes		Seats			Full Council	
Liberal Party	9,473 (43.7%)	▼8.4	7 (26.9%)	7 / 26	Steady	49 (47.1%)	49 / 104
Conservative Party	11,212 (51.8%)	▲4.7	15 (57.7%)	15 / 26	Steady	45 (43.3%)	45 / 104
Liberal Unionist	526 (2.4%)	▲2.4	4 (15.4%)	4 / 26	Steady	10 (9.6%)	10 / 104
Independent	446 (2.1%)	N/A	0 (0.0%)	0 / 26	N/A	0 (0.0%)	0 / 104

=== Full council ===
↓
49	10	45

=== Aldermen ===
↓
15	3	8

=== Councillors ===
↓
34	7	37

== Ward results ==
=== All Saints' ===
All Saints'
Party	Candidate	Votes	%	±%
Conservative	J. Roberts*	uncontested		
Conservative hold		Swing		

=== Ardwick ===
Ardwick
Party	Candidate	Votes	%	±%
Conservative	W. Fitzgerald*	2,282	57.0	N/A
Liberal	H. Matthews	1,723	43.0	N/A
Majority		559	14.0	N/A
Turnout		4,005		
Conservative hold		Swing		

=== Blackley and Moston ===
Blackley and Moston
Party	Candidate	Votes	%	±%
Conservative	T. Briggs*	uncontested		
Conservative hold		Swing		

=== Bradford ===
Bradford
Party	Candidate	Votes	%	±%
Conservative	E. Williams*	uncontested		
Conservative hold		Swing		

=== Cheetham ===
Cheetham
Party	Candidate	Votes	%	±%
Conservative	J. Hampson*	1,514	62.1	N/A
Liberal	G. Hampson	923	37.9	N/A
Majority		591	24.2	N/A
Turnout		2,436		
Conservative hold		Swing		

=== Collegiate Church ===
Collegiate Church
Party	Candidate	Votes	%	±%
Liberal	J. Brooks*	uncontested		
Liberal hold		Swing		

=== Crumpsall ===
Crumpsall
Party	Candidate	Votes	%	±%
Conservative	E. Holt*	uncontested		
Conservative hold		Swing		

=== Exchange ===
Exchange
Party	Candidate	Votes	%	±%
Liberal Unionist	H. Rawson*	uncontested		
Liberal Unionist hold		Swing		

=== Harpurhey ===
Harpurhey
Party	Candidate	Votes	%	±%
Conservative	G. Needham*	uncontested		
Conservative hold		Swing		

=== Longsight ===
Longsight
Party	Candidate	Votes	%	±%
Liberal	T. Uttley*	uncontested		
Liberal hold		Swing		

=== Medlock Street ===
Medlock Street
Party	Candidate	Votes	%	±%
Liberal	W. T. Bax*	uncontested		
Liberal hold		Swing		

=== Miles Platting ===
Miles Platting
Party	Candidate	Votes	%	±%
Conservative	H. Tetlow*	uncontested		
Conservative hold		Swing		

=== New Cross ===
New Cross
Party	Candidate	Votes	%	±%
Conservative	J. Grantham*	uncontested		
Liberal Unionist	H. C. Pingstone*	uncontested		
Conservative hold		Swing		
Liberal Unionist hold		Swing		

=== Newton Heath ===
Newton Heath
Party	Candidate	Votes	%	±%
Conservative	J. Garlick*	1,160	50.2	−2.1
Liberal	R. M. Berrie	1,150	49.8	−4.5
Majority		10	0.4	−2.4
Turnout		2,310		
Conservative hold		Swing		

=== Openshaw ===
Openshaw
Party	Candidate	Votes	%	±%
Conservative	J. Robinson*	1,725	56.5	+4.3
Liberal	J. Ryder	1,329	43.5	−10.0
Majority		396	13.0	
Turnout		3,054		
Conservative hold		Swing		

=== Oxford ===
Oxford
Party	Candidate	Votes	%	±%
Liberal Unionist	G. Clay*	526	60.3	N/A
Liberal	S. Sharp	346	39.7	−10.1
Majority		180	20.6	
Turnout		872		
Liberal Unionist hold		Swing		

=== Rusholme ===
Rusholme
Party	Candidate	Votes	%	±%
Conservative	F. E. Estcourt*	uncontested		
Conservative hold		Swing		

=== St. Ann's ===
St. Ann's
Party	Candidate	Votes	%	±%
Conservative	W. H. Vaudrey*	597	54.1	N/A
Liberal	E. Holt	507	45.9	N/A
Majority		90	8.2	N/A
Turnout		1,104		
Conservative hold		Swing		

=== St. Clement's ===
St. Clement's
Party	Candidate	Votes	%	±%
Conservative	J. H. Andrews*	852	54.8	+9.4
Liberal	T. Swindells	703	45.2	−9.4
Majority		149	9.6	
Turnout		1,555		
Conservative hold		Swing		

=== St. George's ===
St. George's
Party	Candidate	Votes	%	±%
Liberal	J. Norris*	uncontested		
Liberal hold		Swing		

=== St. James' ===
St. James'
Party	Candidate	Votes	%	±%
Liberal Unionist	A. Murray*	uncontested		
Liberal Unionist hold		Swing		

=== St. John's ===
St. John's
Party	Candidate	Votes	%	±%
Conservative	E. L. Kenworthy*	565	55.9	−1.7
Independent	E. Burgess	446	44.1	N/A
Majority		119	11.8	−3.4
Turnout		1,011		
Conservative hold		Swing		

=== St. Luke's ===
St. Luke's
Party	Candidate	Votes	%	±%
Liberal	J. Hoy*	uncontested		
Liberal hold		Swing		

=== St. Mark's ===
St. Mark's
Party	Candidate	Votes	%	±%
Liberal	W. H. Wainwright*	1,053	52.2	−10.9
Conservative	J. Phythian	963	47.8	−1.5
Majority		90	4.4	+3.7
Turnout		2,016		
Liberal hold		Swing		

=== St. Michael's ===
St. Michael's
Party	Candidate	Votes	%	±%
Liberal	J. McCreesh	1,739	52.8	−1.0
Conservative	W. Moulton	1,554	47.2	+12.0
Majority		185	5.6	−13.0
Turnout		3,293		
Liberal hold		Swing		

== Aldermanic elections ==
=== Aldermanic election, 6 April 1892 ===
Caused by the death on 22 February 1892 of Alderman Edmund Asquith (Liberal, elected as an alderman by the council on 7 September 1887).

In his place, Councillor A. E. Lloyd (Liberal, St. James', elected 1 November 1880) was elected as an alderman by the council on 6 April 1892.

Party	Alderman	Ward	Term expires
Liberal	A. E. Lloyd		1892

== By-elections between 1891 and 1892 ==
=== By-elections, 13 April 1892 ===
Two by-elections were held on 13 April 1892 to fill vacancies which had arisen in the city council.

==== Cheetham ====
Caused by the resignation of Councillor Henry Boddington (Conservative, Cheetham, elected 8 March 1881) on 2 March 1892.

Cheetham
Party	Candidate	Votes	%	±%
Conservative	C. H. Braddon	uncontested		
Conservative hold		Swing		

==== St. James' ====
Caused by the election as an alderman of Councillor A. E. Lloyd (Liberal, St. James', elected 1 November 1880) on 6 April 1892 following the death on 22 February 1892 of Alderman Edmund Asquith (Liberal, elected as an alderman by the council on 7 September 1887).

St. James'
Party	Candidate	Votes	%	±%
Liberal	H. J. Goldschmidt	uncontested		
Liberal hold		Swing		
