= Joe Williams (trade unionist) =

British trade union leader

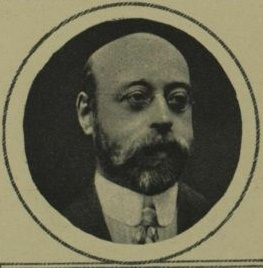
Williams in 1923

Joseph Bevir Williams (10 August 1871 – 3 August 1929) was a British trade union leader.

Born in the Hulme area of Manchester, Williams spent some time as a pupil-teacher before following his father by becoming a musician, finding work as a clarinetist at the Comedy Theatre. Concerned about working conditions in the industry, in 1893, he founded the Amalgamated Musicians' Union (AMU).

The union's first members were Williams' own colleagues, with forty attending the first meeting. Shortly afterwards, Williams' mother, Kate, recruited a group of musicians in Birmingham and, within a year, branches had been set up in a large number of provincial cities. As general secretary of the union, Joe successfully argued that part-time musicians should be permitted to join, but that members of military bands should not earn extra pay by working as civilian musicians in their spare time.

Williams became was elected to Manchester City Council in 1904 as the Labour Representation Committee candidate for Openshaw, with the backing of Manchester and Salford Trades Council. However, two years later, he was declared bankrupt and therefore was excluded from the city council. In 1907, he was elected to the Parliamentary Committee of the Trades Union Congress (TUC), later serving on its successor, the General Council of the TUC, and as President of the TUC in 1923.

Williams' son, also Joe, served in World War I and was killed aged just eighteen. Despite this, he supported the war and, frustrated with the Labour Party's anti-war stance, he was one of the proposers, in 1917, that a new trade union labour party should be created.

After many years of negotiations, in 1921, Williams persuaded the AMU's main rival, the National Orchestral Union of Professional Musicians, to merge into it. He remained general secretary of what was now remained the Musicians' Union until he retired in 1924; although only in his early fifties, he was in poor health following years of extremely long hours of work. He moved to Veyrières in France, where he died in 1929.

Trade union offices
Preceded by New position	General Secretary of the Musicians' Union; 1893–1924	Succeeded by E. S. Teale
Preceded by John Wadsworth and William Henry Wilkinson	Auditor of the Trades Union Congress; 1905; With: John Wadsworth	Succeeded by Alfred Smalley and David Watts Morgan
Preceded by Robert Barrie Walker	President of the Trades Union Congress; 1923	Succeeded by Alf Purcell
