= Jesse Butler =

20th-century British trade unionist and politician

Jesse Butler (fl. 1892 – 1925) was a British trade unionist and politician.

Butler worked as a coal miner in Ashton-under-Lyne, and joined the Lancashire and Cheshire Miners' Federation (LCMF). He became the secretary of his local district, and an assistant miners' agent. He played a leading role in the 1892/93 miners' strike, acting as assistant to Thomas Ashton, secretary of both the LCMF and of the Miners' Federation of Great Britain (MFGB). He raised money for the miners by undertaking public collections in Manchester, and was one of seven men who, as a result, were charged with begging, although the charge was soon dropped.

Soon after the strike, Butler became the LCMF's full-time agent for Ashton-under-Lyne, which later became the union's Manchester district. On three occasions, he was elected to the executive of the MFGB.

Butler was impressed by the contribution of Independent Labour Party (ILP) members to the strike, and so, later in the year, he joined the ILP. He stood for Manchester City Council as an ILP candidate in Openshaw ward at the 1894 election, and won the seat by just 22 votes. This made him one of the first two labour members of the council, along with John Edward Sutton.

In 1897, the ILP became concerned about Butler's record on the council and asked him to produce monthly reports of his activity and to obey all instructions of the party's executive. He refused to do so and left the party. The LCMF later affiliated to the Labour Party, within which Butler became active. In 1916, he was elected to the party's National Executive Committee, serving for a single year. In 1917, he retired from his trade union posts, moving to Baddesley in Warwickshire.

In 1920, Butler was elected to Atherstone Rural District Council, where he remained active until at least 1925.
