= Jerome Caminada =

English police officer (1844–1914)

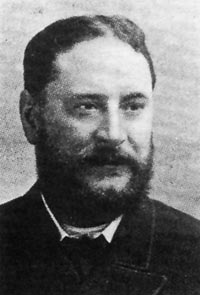
Jerome Caminada

Jerome Caminada (1844 – March 1914) was a 19th-century police officer in Manchester, England. Caminada served with the police between 1868 and 1899, and has been called Manchester's Sherlock Holmes. In 1897 he became the city's first CID superintendent. His most famous case was the Manchester Cab Murder of 1889, in which he discovered and brought the initially unknown perpetrator to trial and conviction only three weeks after the murder.

== Life ==
Caminada was born in Deansgate, Manchester in 1844, to an Irish mother named Mary Boyle and an Italian father. At that time, Deansgate consisted mostly of public houses, brothels, and poor quality housing for mill workers, and was the heart of Victorian Manchester's crime world.

He began working as an engineer in the city, but in February 1868, he joined the Manchester City Police force, at the age of 24. In 1872 he was promoted to sergeant, and transferred to the newly formed detectives division, based in Manchester Town Hall. Over his thirty-one-year career, from 1868 until 1899, he earned the respect of colleagues, judges and criminals alike; he was often known as Detective Jerome to the local criminals, who struggled with pronouncing his last name.

On 25 September 1880 Caminada led a police raid on a cross-dressing ball held in the Temperance Hall in Hulme, rounding up 47 suspects, about half of whom had been in drag and the other half in fancy dress. A blind accordionist had been hired to provide music. Rather than let the alleged evidence of male prostitution be brought to public trial, the magistrates' court bound over all the suspects for a year on two sureties of £25 each.

In 1888, Caminada's national reputation for policing – he was reportedly responsible for the imprisonment of 1,225 criminals and for the closure of 400 public houses – earned him promotion to inspector. Threats on his life were commonplace; Caminada often carried a Colt Lightning Revolver, and had cause to use it on more than one occasion.

Bob Horridge, regarded as public enemy number one in 1880s Manchester, was a Blacksmith in Angel Meadow by day and a violent burglar and armed robber by night, and arch rival of Caminada, who eventually apprehended him in 1887.

Caminada tracked Fenian dynamite conspiracy suspects.

His policing style was eccentric by modern standards, and often involved dressing in disguise to gather evidence on suspects. He maintained a large network of informers, whom he would often meet on the back pew of St Mary's RC Church, known as the Hidden Gem. His methods were effective however, and he was soon made Detective Superintendent.

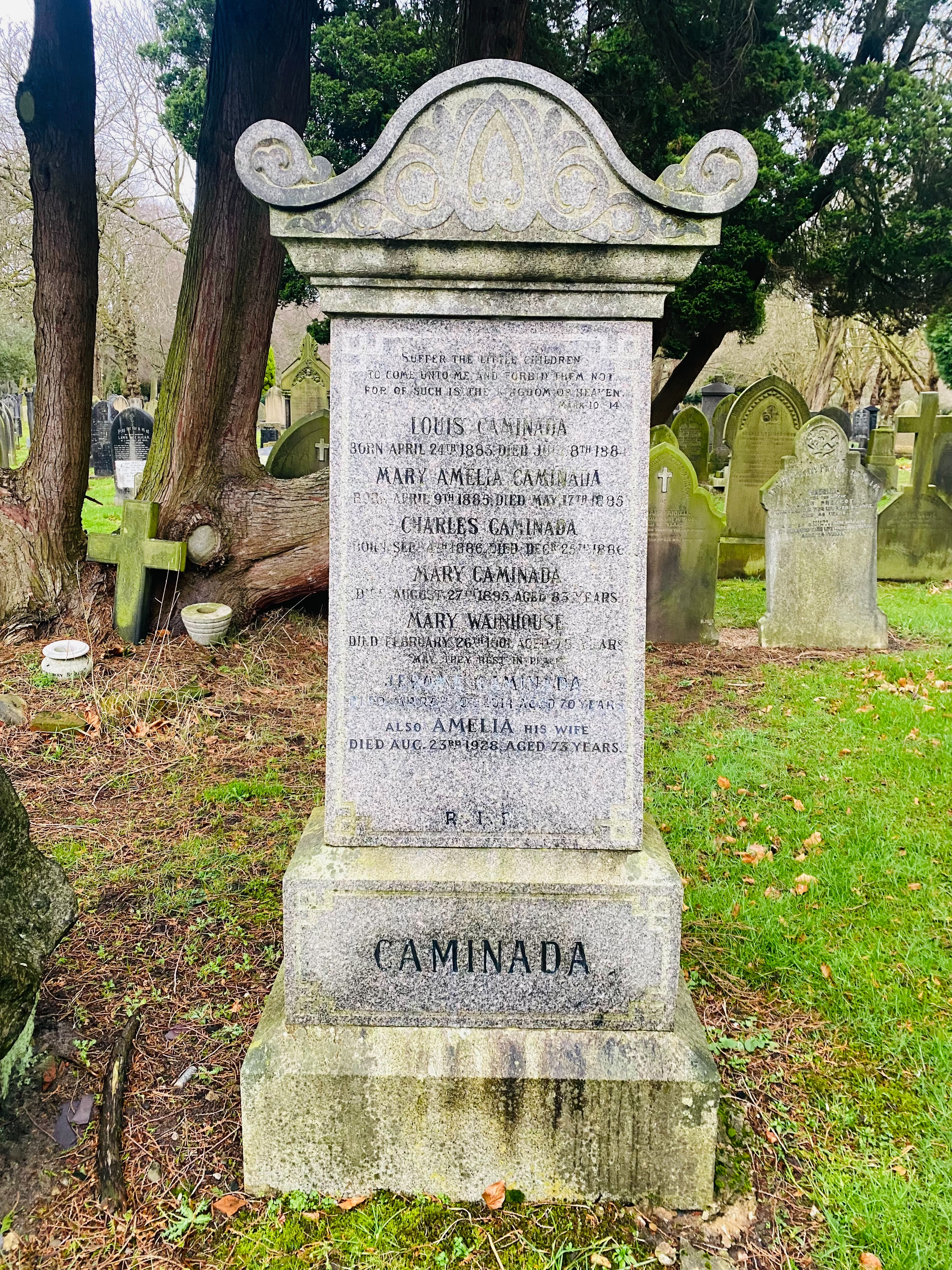
The Caminada family grave in Southern Cemetery, Manchester

Caminada retired in 1899, and became a private detective, an estate agent, and a Manchester city councillor for Openshaw between 1907 and 1910. He died in 1914 at his home in Moss Side at the age of 70, as a result of injuries he had received in a bus accident in North Wales the previous year. He is buried in Manchester's Southern Cemetery.

Angela Buckley, a British historian and trustee of the Society of Genealogists, claims that the Victorian-era detective who featured in Sir Arthur Conan Doyle's novels was based on Jerome Caminada's life. “Caminada became a national figure at just the time that Sherlock Holmes was being created. There are so many parallels that it is clear Doyle was using parts of this real character for his," Buckley was quoted by the Telegraph as saying. Dubbed 'the Garibaldi of Detectives', Caminada rose to prominence in the mid-1880s, shortly before Doyle's debut Holmes novel, A Study in Scarlet, and during his time as an investigator is said to have helped imprison 1,225 criminals. The detective died in 1914 aged 69 – the year the last Holmes book was published.

== Family ==
Caminada married Amelia Wainhouse in the Church of the Holy Name on Oxford Road Chorlton-on-Medlock in 1881. Two children survived into adulthood.

== Writings ==
Caminada wrote the first volume of his autobiography anonymously as Twenty-Five Years of Detective Life in 1895, dedicating the book to the then Chief Constable of the Manchester City Police. Following his retirement, he published a second volume under his own name in 1901. Selected highlights of both volumes were republished in 1994 as Caminada – Crime Buster (ISBN 1-874358-13-3).

== Portrayals ==
The Confessions of Caminada, an audio drama about Caminada's involvement with the Manchester Cab Murder, was broadcast on BBC Radio 4 in 2013. George Costigan played Caminada, and the script was by Christopher Reason.

== Bibliography ==
- Greater Manchester Police (1989), The Police! 150 Years of Policing in the Manchester Area, Runcorn: Archive Publications, ISBN 0-948946-49-0
- O'Neill, Joseph (2008), Crime City: Manchester's Victorian Underworld, Milo Books, ISBN 978-1-903854-77-8
- Hale, Don (December 2007), Secrets of the Royal Detective, Bridge Books, ISBN 978-1-904181-47-7
