= St. Mark's (Manchester ward) =

- Ward
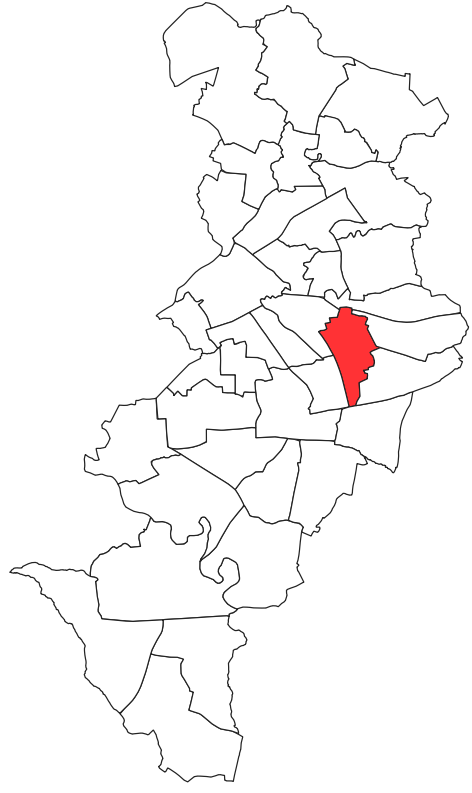
- St. Mark's ward (1954) within Manchester

- Coat of arms
- Country: United Kingdom
- Constituent country: England
- Region: North West England
- County borough: Manchester
- Created: November 1890
- Named for: Openshaw

Government
  - Type: Unicameral
  - Body: Manchester City Council
- UK Parliamentary Constituency: Manchester Ardwick

St. Mark's was an electoral division of Manchester City Council which was represented from 1890 until 1971. It covered parts of Longsight and West Gorton in East Manchester.

== Overview ==
St. Mark's ward was created in 1890, as a result of the Manchester Extension Scheme 1890, which transferred the townships of Blackley, Crumpsall, Moston, Newton, Openshaw, and parts of Gorton to the Manchester corporation. Initially, it covered that part of the incorporated area of Gorton to the north of Hyde Road. In 1919, the northern portion of the Longsight ward was transferred to the ward. Further city-wide boundary revisions in 1950 transferred that part of the Longsight ward to the east of the Crewe-Manchester Line to the ward. The ward was abolished in 1971 and its remaining area was transferred to the Ardwick and Longsight wards.

From its creation until 1918, the ward formed part of the Manchester South Parliamentary constituency. From 1918 until its abolition, it was part of the Manchester Ardwick Parliamentary constituency.

== Councillors ==
| Election | Councillor | Councillor | Councillor |
|---|---|---|---|
| 1890 | L. Higginbottom (Lib) | S. H. Brooks (Lib) | W. H. Wainwright (Lib) |
| November 1890 | E. J. Reynolds (Con) | S. H. Brooks (Lib) | W. H. Wainwright (Lib) |
| 1891 | E. J. Reynolds (Con) | S. H. Brooks (Lib) | W. H. Wainwright (Lib) |
| 1892 | E. J. Reynolds (Con) | S. H. Brooks (Lib) | W. H. Wainwright (Lib) |
| 1893 | J. Phythian (Con) | S. H. Brooks (Lib) | W. H. Wainwright (Lib) |
| 1894 | J. Phythian (Con) | S. H. Brooks (Lib) | W. H. Wainwright (Lib) |
| 1895 | J. Phythian (Con) | S. H. Brooks (Lib) | W. H. Wainwright (Lib) |
| 1896 | J. Phythian (Con) | S. H. Brooks (Lib) | W. H. Wainwright (Lib) |
| 1897 | J. Phythian (Con) | S. H. Brooks (Lib) | W. H. Wainwright (Lib) |
| 1898 | J. Phythian (Con) | W. H. Beastow (Con) | W. H. Wainwright (Lib) |
| 1899 | J. Phythian (Con) | W. H. Beastow (Con) | W. H. Wainwright (Lib) |
| 1900 | J. Phythian (Con) | W. H. Beastow (Con) | W. H. Wainwright (Lib) |
| 1901 | J. Phythian (Con) | W. H. Beastow (Con) | W. H. Wainwright (Lib) |
| January 1902 | J. Allison (Lib) | W. H. Beastow (Con) | W. H. Wainwright (Lib) |
| 1902 | J. Allison (Lib) | W. H. Beastow (Con) | W. H. Wainwright (Lib) |
| 1903 | J. Allison (Lib) | W. H. Beastow (Con) | W. H. Wainwright (Lib) |
| 1904 | J. Allison (Lib) | W. H. Beastow (Con) | W. H. Wainwright (Lib) |
| May 1905 | J. Allison (Lib) | W. H. Beastow (Con) | R. Turner (Ind. Lib) |
| 1905 | J. Allison (Lib) | W. H. Beastow (Con) | R. Turner (Lib) |
| 1906 | J. Allison (Lib) | W. H. Beastow (Con) | R. Turner (Lib) |
| 1907 | J. Allison (Lib) | W. Chapman (Con) | R. Turner (Lib) |
| 1908 | J. Allison (Lib) | W. Chapman (Con) | R. Turner (Lib) |
| 1909 | J. Allison (Lib) | W. Chapman (Con) | R. Turner (Lib) |
| 1910 | J. Allison (Lib) | W. Chapman (Con) | R. Turner (Lib) |
| 1911 | J. Allison (Lib) | W. Chapman (Con) | R. Turner (Lib) |
| 1912 | J. Allison (Lib) | W. Chapman (Con) | R. Turner (Lib) |
| 1913 | J. Allison (Lib) | W. Chapman (Con) | R. Turner (Lib) |
| 1914 | J. Allison (Lib) | W. Chapman (Con) | R. Turner (Lib) |
| 1919 | G. Jennison (Lib) | W. Chapman (Con) | G. Hall (Lab) |
| 1920 | G. Jennison (Lib) | R. Turner (Ind) | G. Hall (Lab) |
| March 1921 | G. Jennison (Lib) | W. Chapman (Con) | G. Hall (Lab) |
| 1921 | I. Brassington (Lab) | W. Chapman (Con) | G. Hall (Lab) |
| 1922 | I. Brassington (Lab) | W. Chapman (Con) | G. Hall (Lab) |
| 1923 | I. Brassington (Lab) | C. Wood (Lab) | G. Hall (Lab) |
| 1924 | I. Brassington (Lab) | C. Wood (Lab) | G. Hall (Lab) |
| 1925 | I. Brassington (Lab) | C. Wood (Lab) | G. Hall (Lab) |
| 1926 | I. Brassington (Lab) | C. Wood (Lab) | G. Hall (Lab) |
| 1927 | I. Brassington (Lab) | C. Wood (Lab) | G. Hall (Lab) |
| 1928 | I. Brassington (Lab) | C. Wood (Lab) | G. Hall (Lab) |
| 1929 | I. Brassington (Lab) | C. Wood (Lab) | G. Hall (Lab) |
| 1930 | I. Brassington (Lab) | C. Wood (Lab) | G. Hall (Lab) |
| 1931 | I. Brassington (Lab) | C. Wood (Lab) | G. Hall (Lab) |
| September 1932 | I. Brassington (Lab) | C. Wood (Lab) | G. Hall (ILP) |
| 1932 | I. Brassington (Lab) | C. Wood (Lab) | G. Hall (ILP) |
| January 1933 | T. M. Larrad (Lab) | C. Wood (Lab) | G. Hall (ILP) |
| 1933 | T. M. Larrad (Lab) | C. Wood (Lab) | G. Hall (ILP) |
| January 1934 | T. M. Larrad (Lab) | C. Wood (Lab) | G. Hall (Ind. Lab) |
| 1934 | T. M. Larrad (Lab) | C. Wood (Lab) | G. Hall (Ind. Lab) |
| 1935 | T. M. Larrad (Lab) | C. Wood (Lab) | G. Hall (Ind. Lab) |
| 1936 | T. M. Larrad (Lab) | C. Wood (Lab) | G. Hall (Ind. Lab) |
| November 1936 | T. M. Larrad (Lab) | C. Wood (Lab) | J. W. Ellershaw (Lab) |
| 1937 | T. M. Larrad (Lab) | C. Wood (Lab) | J. W. Ellershaw (Lab) |
| 1938 | T. M. Larrad (Lab) | C. Wood (Lab) | J. W. Ellershaw (Lab) |
| 1945 | T. M. Larrad (Lab) | H. Eastwood (Lab) | J. W. Ellershaw (Lab) |
| 1946 | T. M. Larrad (Lab) | H. Eastwood (Lab) | J. W. Ellershaw (Lab) |
| 1947 | T. M. Larrad (Lab) | H. Eastwood (Lab) | J. W. Ellershaw (Lab) |
| 1949 | T. M. Larrad (Lab) | H. Eastwood (Lab) | J. W. Ellershaw (Lab) |
| 1950 | T. M. Larrad (Lab) | H. Eastwood (Lab) | J. W. Ellershaw (Lab) |
| 1951 | T. M. Larrad (Lab) | H. Eastwood (Lab) | J. W. Ellershaw (Lab) |
| November 1951 | W. Shaw (Lab) | H. Eastwood (Lab) | J. W. Ellershaw (Lab) |
| 1952 | W. Shaw (Lab) | H. Eastwood (Lab) | J. W. Ellershaw (Lab) |
| 1953 | W. Shaw (Lab) | H. Eastwood (Lab) | J. W. Ellershaw (Lab) |
| 1954 | W. Shaw (Lab) | B. Conlan (Lab) | L. Drury (Lab) |
| 1955 | W. Shaw (Lab) | B. Conlan (Lab) | L. Drury (Lab) |
| 1956 | W. Shaw (Lab) | B. Conlan (Lab) | N. Morris (Lab) |
| 1957 | W. Shaw (Lab) | B. Conlan (Lab) | N. Morris (Lab) |
| 1958 | W. Shaw (Lab) | B. Conlan (Lab) | N. Morris (Lab) |
| 1959 | W. Shaw (Lab) | B. Conlan (Lab) | N. Morris (Lab) |
| 1960 | W. Shaw (Lab) | B. Conlan (Lab) | N. Morris (Lab) |
| 1961 | W. Shaw (Lab) | B. Conlan (Lab) | N. Morris (Lab) |
| 1962 | W. Shaw (Lab) | B. Conlan (Lab) | N. Morris (Lab) |
| 1963 | W. Shaw (Lab) | B. Conlan (Lab) | N. Morris (Lab) |
| 1964 | W. Shaw (Lab) | B. Conlan (Lab) | N. Morris (Lab) |
| 1965 | W. Shaw (Lab) | B. Conlan (Lab) | N. Morris (Lab) |
| 1966 | W. Shaw (Lab) | J. T. Morgan (Lab) | N. Morris (Lab) |
| 1967 | W. Shaw (Lab) | J. T. Morgan (Lab) | N. Morris (Lab) |
| 1968 | W. Shaw (Lab) | J. T. Morgan (Lab) | N. Morris (Lab) |
| 1969 | W. Shaw (Lab) | J. T. Morgan (Lab) | N. Morris (Lab) |
| September 1969 | W. Shaw (Lab) | W. A. Downward (Lab) | N. Morris (Lab) |
| 1970 | W. Shaw (Lab) | W. A. Downward (Lab) | N. Morris (Lab) |

== Elections ==
=== Elections in 1890s ===
==== November 1890 ====
1890 (3 vacancies)
| Party | Candidate | Votes | % | ±% |
|---|---|---|---|---|
| Liberal | L. Higginbottom | 1,179 | 63.1 | |
| Liberal | S. H. Brooks | 1,016 | 54.4 | |
| Liberal | W. H. Wainwright | 935 | 50.0 | |
| Conservative | E. J. Reynolds | 922 | 49.3 | |
| Conservative | J. Phythian | 846 | 45.3 | |
| Conservative | W. Macbeth | 710 | 38.0 | |
| Majority | | 13 | 0.7 | |
| Turnout | | 1,869 | | |
| Liberal win (new seat) | | | | |
| Liberal win (new seat) | | | | |
| Liberal win (new seat) | | | | |

==== November 1890 (by-election) ====
By-election: 30 November 1890
| Party | Candidate | Votes | % | ±% |
|---|---|---|---|---|
| Conservative | E. J. Reynolds | 942 | 50.6 | +1.3 |
| Liberal | O. Gwatkin | 920 | 49.3 | −13.7 |
| Majority | | 22 | 1.2 | |
| Turnout | | 1,862 | | |
| Conservative gain from Liberal | | Swing | | |

==== November 1891 ====
1891
| Party | Candidate | Votes | % | ±% |
|---|---|---|---|---|
| Liberal | W. H. Wainwright* | 1,053 | 52.2 | −10.9 |
| Conservative | J. Phythian | 963 | 47.8 | −1.5 |
| Majority | | 90 | 4.4 | +3.7 |
| Turnout | | 2,016 | | |
| Liberal hold | | Swing | | |

==== November 1892 ====
1892
| Party | Candidate | Votes | % | ±% |
|---|---|---|---|---|
| Liberal | S. H. Brooks* | 870 | 50.1 | −2.1 |
| Conservative | J. Phythian | 666 | 38.4 | −9.4 |
| Independent Labour | E. S. Jones | 200 | 11.5 | N/A |
| Majority | | 204 | 11.7 | +7.3 |
| Turnout | | 1,736 | | |
| Liberal hold | | Swing | | |

==== November 1893 ====
1893
| Party | Candidate | Votes | % | ±% |
|---|---|---|---|---|
| Conservative | J. Phythian | 956 | 54.7 | +16.3 |
| Ind. Labour Party | F. Lawler | 792 | 45.3 | N/A |
| Majority | | 164 | 9.4 | |
| Turnout | | 1,748 | | |
| Conservative hold | | Swing | | |

==== November 1894 ====
1894
| Party | Candidate | Votes | % | ±% |
|---|---|---|---|---|
| Liberal | W. H. Wainwright* | 1,140 | 61.8 | N/A |
| Ind. Labour Party | F. Lawler | 706 | 38.2 | −7.1 |
| Majority | | 434 | 23.6 | |
| Turnout | | 1,846 | | |
| Liberal hold | | Swing | | |

==== November 1895 ====
1895
| Party | Candidate | Votes | % | ±% |
|---|---|---|---|---|
| Liberal | S. H. Brooks* | uncontested | | |
| Liberal hold | | Swing | | |

==== November 1896 ====
1896
| Party | Candidate | Votes | % | ±% |
|---|---|---|---|---|
| Conservative | J. Phythian* | 904 | 53.1 | N/A |
| Ind. Labour Party | W. H. Griffiths | 797 | 46.9 | N/A |
| Majority | | 107 | 6.2 | N/A |
| Turnout | | 1,701 | | |
| Conservative hold | | Swing | | |

==== November 1897 ====
1897
| Party | Candidate | Votes | % | ±% |
|---|---|---|---|---|
| Liberal | W. H. Wainwright* | 1,087 | 58.5 | N/A |
| Ind. Labour Party | W. H. Griffiths | 772 | 41.5 | N/A |
| Majority | | 315 | 17.0 | |
| Turnout | | 1,859 | | |
| Liberal hold | | Swing | | |

==== November 1898 ====
1898
| Party | Candidate | Votes | % | ±% |
|---|---|---|---|---|
| Conservative | W. H. Beastow | 1,231 | 74.6 | N/A |
| Ind. Labour Party | W. H. Griffiths | 420 | 25.4 | −16.1 |
| Majority | | 811 | 49.2 | |
| Turnout | | 1,651 | | |
| Conservative gain from Liberal | | Swing | | |

==== November 1899 ====
1899
| Party | Candidate | Votes | % | ±% |
|---|---|---|---|---|
| Conservative | J. Phythian* | 729 | 43.8 | −30.8 |
| Liberal | J. Allison | 596 | 35.8 | N/A |
| Ind. Labour Party | G. Gregory | 338 | 20.4 | −5.0 |
| Majority | | 133 | 8.0 | −41.2 |
| Turnout | | 1,663 | | |
| Conservative hold | | Swing | | |

=== Elections in 1900s ===
==== November 1900 ====
1900
| Party | Candidate | Votes | % | ±% |
|---|---|---|---|---|
| Liberal | W. H. Wainwright* | uncontested | | |
| Liberal hold | | Swing | | |

==== November 1901 ====
1901
| Party | Candidate | Votes | % | ±% |
|---|---|---|---|---|
| Conservative | W. H. Beastow* | uncontested | | |
| Conservative hold | | Swing | | |

==== January 1902 (by-election) ====
By-election: 27 January 1902
| Party | Candidate | Votes | % | ±% |
|---|---|---|---|---|
| Liberal | J. Allison | 853 | 54.6 | N/A |
| Conservative | G. Jennison | 708 | 45.4 | N/A |
| Majority | | 145 | 9.2 | N/A |
| Turnout | | 1,561 | | |
| Liberal gain from Conservative | | Swing | | |

==== November 1902 ====
1902
| Party | Candidate | Votes | % | ±% |
|---|---|---|---|---|
| Liberal | J. Allison* | 987 | 59.5 | N/A |
| Conservative | R. Cadman | 673 | 40.5 | N/A |
| Majority | | 314 | 19.0 | N/A |
| Turnout | | 1,660 | | |
| Liberal hold | | Swing | | |

==== November 1903 ====
1903
| Party | Candidate | Votes | % | ±% |
|---|---|---|---|---|
| Liberal | W. H. Wainwright* | 966 | 62.7 | +3.2 |
| Independent | H. M. Ross Clyne | 574 | 37.3 | N/A |
| Majority | | 392 | 25.4 | +6.4 |
| Turnout | | 1,540 | | |
| Liberal hold | | Swing | | |

==== November 1904 ====
1904
| Party | Candidate | Votes | % | ±% |
|---|---|---|---|---|
| Conservative | W. H. Beastow* | uncontested | | |
| Conservative hold | | Swing | | |

==== May 1905 (by-election) ====
By-election: 30 May 1905
| Party | Candidate | Votes | % | ±% |
|---|---|---|---|---|
| Independent Liberal | R. Turner | 778 | 48.0 | N/A |
| Liberal | G. Jennison | 315 | 19.4 | N/A |
| Labour | L. Martin | 278 | 17.2 | N/A |
| Independent Labour | H. C. Campbell | 249 | 15.4 | N/A |
| Majority | | 463 | 28.6 | N/A |
| Turnout | | 1,620 | | |
| Independent Liberal gain from Liberal | | Swing | | |

==== November 1905 ====
1905
| Party | Candidate | Votes | % | ±% |
|---|---|---|---|---|
| Liberal | J. Allison* | 985 | 59.1 | N/A |
| Independent Liberal | H. J. Whitehouse | 682 | 40.9 | N/A |
| Majority | | 303 | 18.2 | N/A |
| Turnout | | 1,667 | | |
| Liberal hold | | Swing | | |

==== November 1906 ====
1906
| Party | Candidate | Votes | % | ±% |
|---|---|---|---|---|
| Liberal | R. Turner* | uncontested | | |
| Liberal hold | | Swing | | |

==== November 1907 ====
1907
| Party | Candidate | Votes | % | ±% |
|---|---|---|---|---|
| Conservative | W. Chapman | 987 | 65.7 | N/A |
| Labour | R. Robinson | 516 | 34.3 | N/A |
| Majority | | 471 | 31.4 | N/A |
| Turnout | | 1,503 | | |
| Conservative hold | | Swing | | |

==== November 1908 ====
1908
| Party | Candidate | Votes | % | ±% |
|---|---|---|---|---|
| Liberal | J. Allison* | 915 | 57.4 | N/A |
| Labour | G. Hall | 679 | 42.6 | +8.3 |
| Majority | | 236 | 14.8 | |
| Turnout | | 1,594 | | |
| Liberal hold | | Swing | | |

==== November 1909 ====
1909
| Party | Candidate | Votes | % | ±% |
|---|---|---|---|---|
| Liberal | R. Turner* | 1,239 | 75.5 | +18.1 |
| Conservative | C. H. Penketh | 403 | 24.5 | N/A |
| Majority | | 836 | 51.0 | +36.2 |
| Turnout | | 1,642 | | |
| Liberal hold | | Swing | | |

=== Elections in 1910s ===
==== November 1910 ====
1910
| Party | Candidate | Votes | % | ±% |
|---|---|---|---|---|
| Conservative | W. Chapman* | uncontested | | |
| Conservative hold | | Swing | | |

==== November 1911 ====
1911
| Party | Candidate | Votes | % | ±% |
|---|---|---|---|---|
| Liberal | J. Allison* | 816 | 50.7 | N/A |
| Labour | A. Legge | 794 | 49.3 | N/A |
| Majority | | 22 | 1.4 | N/A |
| Turnout | | 1,610 | | |
| Liberal hold | | Swing | | |

==== November 1912 ====
1912
| Party | Candidate | Votes | % | ±% |
|---|---|---|---|---|
| Liberal | R. Turner* | uncontested | | |
| Liberal hold | | Swing | | |

==== November 1913 ====
1913
| Party | Candidate | Votes | % | ±% |
|---|---|---|---|---|
| Conservative | W. Chapman* | 991 | 58.3 | N/A |
| Labour | G. Hall | 709 | 41.7 | N/A |
| Majority | | 282 | 16.6 | N/A |
| Turnout | | 1,700 | | |
| Conservative hold | | Swing | | |

==== November 1914 ====
1914
| Party | Candidate | Votes | % | ±% |
|---|---|---|---|---|
| Liberal | J. Allison* | uncontested | | |
| Liberal hold | | Swing | | |

==== November 1919 ====
1919 (new boundaries)
| Party | Candidate | Votes | % | ±% |
|---|---|---|---|---|
| Labour | G. Hall | 2,543 | 51.4 | |
| Independent | R. Turner* | 2,401 | 48.6 | |
| Majority | | 142 | 2.9 | |
| Turnout | | 4,944 | 49.7 | |
| Labour gain from Independent | | Swing | | |

=== Elections in 1920s ===
==== November 1920 ====
1920
| Party | Candidate | Votes | % | ±% |
|---|---|---|---|---|
| Independent | R. Turner | 4,204 | 67.0 | +18.4 |
| Labour | W. R. Watson | 2,075 | 33.0 | −18.4 |
| Majority | | 2,129 | 34.0 | |
| Turnout | | 6,279 | 63.1 | +13.4 |
| Independent gain from Conservative | | Swing | | |

==== March 1921 (by-election) ====
By-election: 15 March 1921
| Party | Candidate | Votes | % | ±% |
|---|---|---|---|---|
| Conservative | W. Chapman | 2,423 | 52.9 | N/A |
| Labour | E. Whiteley | 2,161 | 47.1 | +14.1 |
| Majority | | 262 | 5.8 | |
| Turnout | | 4,584 | | |
| Conservative hold | | Swing | | |

==== November 1921 ====
1921
| Party | Candidate | Votes | % | ±% |
|---|---|---|---|---|
| Labour | I. Brassington | 2,652 | 46.9 | +13.9 |
| Conservative | W. P. Jackson | 2,030 | 35.9 | N.A |
| Liberal | G. Jennison* | 972 | 17.2 | N/A |
| Majority | | 622 | 11.0 | |
| Turnout | | 5,642 | 56.9 | −6.2 |
| Labour gain from Liberal | | Swing | | |

==== November 1922 ====
1922
| Party | Candidate | Votes | % | ±% |
|---|---|---|---|---|
| Labour | G. Hall* | 3,436 | 52.3 | +5.4 |
| Conservative | W. P. Jackson | 3,134 | 47.7 | +11.8 |
| Majority | | 302 | 4.6 | −6.4 |
| Turnout | | 6,597 | 65.2 | +8.3 |
| Labour hold | | Swing | | |

==== November 1923 ====
1923
| Party | Candidate | Votes | % | ±% |
|---|---|---|---|---|
| Labour | C. Wood | 3,309 | 58.0 | +5.7 |
| Conservative | W. Chapman* | 2,399 | 42.0 | −5.7 |
| Majority | | 910 | 16.0 | +11.4 |
| Turnout | | 5,708 | | |
| Labour gain from Conservative | | Swing | | |

==== November 1924 ====
1924
| Party | Candidate | Votes | % | ±% |
|---|---|---|---|---|
| Labour | I. Brassington* | 3,142 | 62.5 | +4.5 |
| Conservative | J. T. Jones | 1,549 | 30.8 | −11.2 |
| National Unemployed Workers' Movement | E. Jones | 335 | 6.7 | N/A |
| Majority | | 1,593 | 31.7 | +15.7 |
| Turnout | | 5,026 | | |
| Labour hold | | Swing | | |

==== November 1925 ====
1925
| Party | Candidate | Votes | % | ±% |
|---|---|---|---|---|
| Labour | G. Hall* | 4,056 | 67.8 | +5.3 |
| Conservative | E. Filmer | 1,925 | 32.2 | +1.4 |
| Majority | | 2,131 | 35.6 | +3.9 |
| Turnout | | 5,981 | 58.3 | |
| Labour hold | | Swing | | |

==== November 1926 ====
1926
| Party | Candidate | Votes | % | ±% |
|---|---|---|---|---|
| Labour | C. Wood* | 3,700 | 72.0 | +4.2 |
| Conservative | J. F. Bennison | 1,441 | 28.0 | −4.2 |
| Majority | | 2,259 | 44.0 | +8.4 |
| Turnout | | 5,141 | 50.0 | −8.3 |
| Labour hold | | Swing | | |

==== November 1927 ====
1927
| Party | Candidate | Votes | % | ±% |
|---|---|---|---|---|
| Labour | I. Brassington* | uncontested | | |
| Labour hold | | Swing | | |

==== November 1928 ====
1928
| Party | Candidate | Votes | % | ±% |
|---|---|---|---|---|
| Labour | G. Hall* | 4,002 | 67.8 | N/A |
| Conservative | E. Filmer | 1,834 | 31.1 | N/A |
| Residents | E. Walker | 64 | 1.1 | N/A |
| Majority | | 2,168 | 36.7 | N/A |
| Turnout | | 5,901 | 68.1 | N/A |
| Labour hold | | Swing | | |

==== November 1929 ====
1929
| Party | Candidate | Votes | % | ±% |
|---|---|---|---|---|
| Labour | C. Wood* | 3,122 | 76.2 | +8.4 |
| Conservative | E. Filmer | 973 | 23.8 | −7.3 |
| Majority | | 2,149 | 52.4 | +15.7 |
| Turnout | | 4,095 | 37.2 | −30.9 |
| Labour hold | | Swing | | |

=== Elections in 1930s ===
==== November 1930 ====
1930
| Party | Candidate | Votes | % | ±% |
|---|---|---|---|---|
| Labour | I. Brassington* | 2,154 | 57.7 | −18.5 |
| Conservative | F. P. Ogden | 1,577 | 42.3 | +18.5 |
| Majority | | 577 | 15.4 | −37.0 |
| Turnout | | 3,731 | | |
| Labour hold | | Swing | | |

==== November 1931 ====
1931
| Party | Candidate | Votes | % | ±% |
|---|---|---|---|---|
| Labour | G. Hall* | 3,177 | 50.6 | −7.1 |
| Conservative | G. Moores | 3,102 | 49.4 | +7.1 |
| Majority | | 75 | 1.2 | −14.2 |
| Turnout | | 6,279 | 58.3 | |
| Labour hold | | Swing | | |

==== November 1932 ====
1932
| Party | Candidate | Votes | % | ±% |
|---|---|---|---|---|
| Labour | C. Wood* | 3,329 | 67.4 | +16.8 |
| Conservative | G. Moores | 1,611 | 32.6 | −16.8 |
| Majority | | 1,718 | 34.8 | +33.6 |
| Turnout | | 4,940 | | |
| Labour hold | | Swing | | |

==== January 1933 (by-election) ====
By-election: 17 January 1933
| Party | Candidate | Votes | % | ±% |
|---|---|---|---|---|
| Labour | T. M. Larrad | 1,627 | 86.0 | +18.6 |
| Communist | A. Jackson | 161 | 8.5 | N/A |
| Residents | A. R. Edwards | 104 | 5.5 | N/A |
| Majority | | 1,466 | 77.5 | +42.7 |
| Turnout | | 1,892 | | |
| Labour hold | | Swing | | |

==== November 1933 ====
1933
| Party | Candidate | Votes | % | ±% |
|---|---|---|---|---|
| Labour | T. M. Larrad* | 2,975 | 70.5 | +3.1 |
| Conservative | A. E. Tillsley | 1,242 | 29.5 | −3.1 |
| Majority | | 1,733 | 41.0 | +6.2 |
| Turnout | | 4,217 | | |
| Labour hold | | Swing | | |

==== November 1934 ====
1934
| Party | Candidate | Votes | % | ±% |
|---|---|---|---|---|
| Independent Labour | G. Hall* | 3,079 | 69.3 | N/A |
| Conservative | G. Moores | 1,361 | 30.7 | +1.2 |
| Majority | | 1,718 | 38.6 | |
| Turnout | | 4,440 | | |
| Independent Labour hold | | Swing | | |

==== November 1935 ====
1935
| Party | Candidate | Votes | % | ±% |
|---|---|---|---|---|
| Labour | C. Wood* | uncontested | | |
| Labour hold | | Swing | | |

==== November 1936 ====
1936
| Party | Candidate | Votes | % | ±% |
|---|---|---|---|---|
| Labour | T. M. Larrad* | 2,421 | 63.3 | N/A |
| Conservative | S. Bloor | 1,403 | 36.7 | N/A |
| Majority | | 1,018 | 26.6 | N/A |
| Turnout | | 3,824 | | |
| Labour hold | | Swing | | |

==== November 1936 (by-election) ====
By-election: 26 November 1936
| Party | Candidate | Votes | % | ±% |
|---|---|---|---|---|
| Labour | J. W. Ellershaw | 2,006 | 53.0 | −10.3 |
| Conservative | G. Boden | 1,782 | 47.0 | +10.3 |
| Majority | | 224 | 6.0 | −20.6 |
| Turnout | | 3,788 | | |
| Labour gain from Independent Labour | | Swing | | |

==== November 1937 ====
1937
| Party | Candidate | Votes | % | ±% |
|---|---|---|---|---|
| Labour | J. W. Ellershaw* | 2,474 | 58.2 | −5.1 |
| Conservative | G. Boden | 1,780 | 41.8 | +5.1 |
| Majority | | 694 | 16.4 | −10.2 |
| Turnout | | 4,254 | | |
| Labour hold | | Swing | | |

==== November 1938 ====
1938
| Party | Candidate | Votes | % | ±% |
|---|---|---|---|---|
| Labour | C. Wood* | uncontested | | |
| Labour hold | | Swing | | |

=== Elections in 1940s ===
==== November 1945 ====
1945 (2 vacancies)
| Party | Candidate | Votes | % | ±% |
|---|---|---|---|---|
| Labour | T. M. Larrad* | 3,238 | 65.1 | N/A |
| Labour | H. Eastwood | 3,067 | 61.6 | N/A |
| Conservative | W. Sharp | 1,738 | 34.9 | N/A |
| Majority | | 1,329 | 26.7 | N/A |
| Turnout | | 4,976 | 37.2 | |
| Labour hold | | Swing | | |
| Labour hold | | Swing | | |

==== November 1946 ====
1946
| Party | Candidate | Votes | % | ±% |
|---|---|---|---|---|
| Labour | J. W. Ellershaw* | 3,172 | 62.0 | −3.1 |
| Conservative | W. Sharp | 1,779 | 34.8 | −0.1 |
| Liberal | A. McCann | 172 | 3.4 | N/A |
| Majority | | 1,393 | 27.2 | +0.5 |
| Turnout | | 5,114 | | |
| Labour hold | | Swing | | |

==== November 1947 ====
1947
| Party | Candidate | Votes | % | ±% |
|---|---|---|---|---|
| Labour | H. Eastwood* | 3,812 | 56.0 | −6.0 |
| Conservative | W. Sharp | 3,000 | 44.0 | +9.2 |
| Majority | | 812 | 12.0 | −15.2 |
| Turnout | | 6,812 | | |
| Labour hold | | Swing | | |

==== May 1949 ====
1949
| Party | Candidate | Votes | % | ±% |
|---|---|---|---|---|
| Labour | T. M. Larrad* | 4,146 | 58.7 | +2.7 |
| Conservative | W. Sharp | 2,912 | 41.3 | −2.7 |
| Majority | | 1,234 | 17.4 | +5.4 |
| Turnout | | 7,058 | | |
| Labour hold | | Swing | | |

=== Elections in 1950s ===
==== May 1950 ====
1950 (new boundaries)
| Party | Candidate | Votes | % | ±% |
|---|---|---|---|---|
| Labour | J. W. Ellershaw* | 3,696 | 58.3 | |
| Conservative | J. Kilroy | 2,645 | 41.7 | |
| Majority | | 1,051 | 16.6 | |
| Turnout | | 6,341 | | |
| Labour hold | | Swing | | |

==== May 1951 ====
1951
| Party | Candidate | Votes | % | ±% |
|---|---|---|---|---|
| Labour | H. Eastwood* | 3,041 | 52.6 | −5.7 |
| Conservative | C. E. Toll | 2,743 | 47.4 | +5.7 |
| Majority | | 298 | 5.2 | −11.4 |
| Turnout | | 5,784 | | |
| Labour hold | | Swing | | |

==== November 1951 (by-election) ====
By-election: 29 November 1951
| Party | Candidate | Votes | % | ±% |
|---|---|---|---|---|
| Labour | W. Shaw | 2,785 | 57.5 | +4.9 |
| Conservative | P. J. Taylor | 2,062 | 42.5 | −4.9 |
| Majority | | 723 | 15.0 | +9.8 |
| Turnout | | 4,847 | | |
| Labour hold | | Swing | | |

==== May 1952 ====
1952
| Party | Candidate | Votes | % | ±% |
|---|---|---|---|---|
| Labour | W. Shaw* | 4,539 | 67.5 | +14.9 |
| Conservative | N. Fins | 2,181 | 32.5 | −14.9 |
| Majority | | 2,358 | 35.0 | +29.8 |
| Turnout | | 6,720 | | |
| Labour hold | | Swing | | |

==== May 1953 ====
1953
| Party | Candidate | Votes | % | ±% |
|---|---|---|---|---|
| Labour | J. W. Ellershaw* | 3,709 | 67.4 | −0.1 |
| Conservative | E. A. Leggett | 1,791 | 32.6 | +0.1 |
| Majority | | 1,918 | 34.8 | −0.2 |
| Turnout | | 5,500 | | |
| Labour hold | | Swing | | |

==== May 1954 ====
1954 (2 vacancies)
| Party | Candidate | Votes | % | ±% |
|---|---|---|---|---|
| Labour | B. Conlan | 3,905 | 67.2 | −0.2 |
| Labour | L. Drury | 3,891 | 67.0 | −0.4 |
| Conservative | E. A. Leggett | 1,930 | 32.6 | +0.6 |
| Conservative | W. H. Fleetwood | 1,895 | 32.6 | 0 |
| Majority | | 1,961 | 33.7 | −1.1 |
| Turnout | | 5,811 | | |
| Labour hold | | Swing | | |
| Labour hold | | Swing | | |

==== May 1955 ====
1955
| Party | Candidate | Votes | % | ±% |
|---|---|---|---|---|
| Labour | W. Shaw* | 3,408 | 66.8 | −0.4 |
| Conservative | W. H. Fleetwood | 1,691 | 33.2 | +0.6 |
| Majority | | 1,717 | 33.6 | −0.1 |
| Turnout | | 5,099 | | |
| Labour hold | | Swing | | |

==== May 1956 ====
1956
| Party | Candidate | Votes | % | ±% |
|---|---|---|---|---|
| Labour | N. Morris | 2,932 | 65.9 | −0.9 |
| Conservative | R. Jones | 1,514 | 34.1 | +0.9 |
| Majority | | 1,418 | 31.8 | −1.8 |
| Turnout | | 4,446 | | |
| Labour hold | | Swing | | |

==== May 1957 ====
1957
| Party | Candidate | Votes | % | ±% |
|---|---|---|---|---|
| Labour | B. Conlan* | 2,621 | 73.3 | +7.4 |
| Conservative | R. Jones | 954 | 26.7 | −7.4 |
| Majority | | 1,667 | 46.6 | +14.8 |
| Turnout | | 3,575 | | |
| Labour hold | | Swing | | |

==== May 1958 ====
1958
| Party | Candidate | Votes | % | ±% |
|---|---|---|---|---|
| Labour | W. Shaw* | 2,781 | 77.9 | +4.6 |
| Conservative | W. H. Fleetwood | 791 | 22.1 | −4.6 |
| Majority | | 1,990 | 55.8 | +9.2 |
| Turnout | | 3,572 | | |
| Labour hold | | Swing | | |

==== May 1959 ====
1959
| Party | Candidate | Votes | % | ±% |
|---|---|---|---|---|
| Labour | N. Morris* | 2,492 | 68.7 | −9.2 |
| Conservative | W. H. Fleetwood | 1,134 | 31.3 | +9.2 |
| Majority | | 1,358 | 37.4 | −18.4 |
| Turnout | | 3,626 | | |
| Labour hold | | Swing | | |

=== Elections in 1960s ===
==== May 1960 ====
1960
| Party | Candidate | Votes | % | ±% |
|---|---|---|---|---|
| Labour | B. Conlan* | 1,809 | 64.8 | −4.9 |
| Conservative | W. H. Fleetwood | 983 | 35.2 | +4.9 |
| Majority | | 826 | 29.6 | −7.8 |
| Turnout | | 2,792 | | |
| Labour hold | | Swing | | |

==== May 1961 ====
1961
| Party | Candidate | Votes | % | ±% |
|---|---|---|---|---|
| Labour | W. Shaw* | 2,206 | 64.2 | −0.6 |
| Conservative | E. Geddes | 1,230 | 35.8 | +0.6 |
| Majority | | 976 | 28.4 | −1.2 |
| Turnout | | 3,436 | | |
| Labour hold | | Swing | | |

==== May 1962 ====
1962
| Party | Candidate | Votes | % | ±% |
|---|---|---|---|---|
| Labour | N. Morris* | 2,416 | 69.8 | +5.6 |
| Conservative | E. Geddes | 1,047 | 30.2 | −5.6 |
| Majority | | 1,369 | 39.6 | +11.2 |
| Turnout | | 3,463 | | |
| Labour hold | | Swing | | |

==== May 1963 ====
1963
| Party | Candidate | Votes | % | ±% |
|---|---|---|---|---|
| Labour | B. Conlan* | 2,342 | 75.4 | +5.6 |
| Conservative | I. Goslin | 609 | 19.6 | −10.6 |
| Union Movement | R. G. Quinn | 155 | 5.0 | N/A |
| Majority | | 1,733 | 55.8 | +16.2 |
| Turnout | | 3,106 | | |
| Labour hold | | Swing | | |

==== May 1964 ====
1964
| Party | Candidate | Votes | % | ±% |
|---|---|---|---|---|
| Labour | W. Shaw* | 2,259 | 76.9 | +1.5 |
| Conservative | I. Goslin | 677 | 23.1 | +3.5 |
| Majority | | 1,582 | 53.8 | −2.0 |
| Turnout | | 2,936 | | |
| Labour hold | | Swing | | |

==== May 1965 ====
1965
| Party | Candidate | Votes | % | ±% |
|---|---|---|---|---|
| Labour | N. Morris* | 1,535 | 64.1 | −12.8 |
| Conservative | I. Goslin | 858 | 35.9 | +12.8 |
| Majority | | 677 | 28.2 | −25.6 |
| Turnout | | 2,393 | | |
| Labour hold | | Swing | | |

==== May 1966 ====
1966
| Party | Candidate | Votes | % | ±% |
|---|---|---|---|---|
| Labour | J. T. Morgan | 1,468 | 67.1 | +3.0 |
| Conservative | A. E. Welsby | 451 | 20.6 | −15.3 |
| Independent | R. C. Allison | 269 | 12.3 | N/A |
| Majority | | 1,017 | 46.5 | +18.3 |
| Turnout | | 2,188 | | |
| Labour hold | | Swing | | |

==== May 1967 ====
1967
| Party | Candidate | Votes | % | ±% |
|---|---|---|---|---|
| Labour | W. Shaw* | 1,094 | 51.8 | −15.3 |
| Conservative | A. E. Welsby | 769 | 36.4 | +15.8 |
| Independent | R. C. Allison | 250 | 11.8 | −0.5 |
| Majority | | 325 | 15.4 | −31.1 |
| Turnout | | 2,113 | | |
| Labour hold | | Swing | | |

==== May 1968 ====
1968
| Party | Candidate | Votes | % | ±% |
|---|---|---|---|---|
| Labour | N. Morris* | 1,191 | 49.1 | −2.7 |
| Conservative | A. Welsby | 1,065 | 43.9 | +7.5 |
| Union Movement | D. S. Lawson | 105 | 4.3 | N/A |
| Residents | A. W. King | 63 | 2.6 | N/A |
| Majority | | 126 | 5.2 | −10.2 |
| Turnout | | 2,424 | | |
| Labour hold | | Swing | | |

==== May 1969 ====
1969
| Party | Candidate | Votes | % | ±% |
|---|---|---|---|---|
| Labour | J. T. Morgan* | 1,343 | 47.5 | −1.6 |
| Conservative | C. R. Savage | 1,295 | 45.8 | +1.9 |
| Union Movement | D. S. Lawson | 132 | 4.7 | +0.4 |
| Residents | A. W. King | 56 | 2.0 | −0.6 |
| Majority | | 48 | 1.7 | −3.5 |
| Turnout | | 2,826 | | |
| Labour hold | | Swing | | |

==== September 1969 (by-election) ====
By-election: 18 September 1969
| Party | Candidate | Votes | % | ±% |
|---|---|---|---|---|
| Labour | W. A. Downward | 1,700 | 56.3 | +8.8 |
| Conservative | C. R. Savage | 1,318 | 43.7 | −2.1 |
| Majority | | 382 | 12.6 | +10.9 |
| Turnout | | 3,018 | | |
| Labour hold | | Swing | | |

=== Elections in 1970s ===
==== May 1970 ====
1970
| Party | Candidate | Votes | % | ±% |
|---|---|---|---|---|
| Labour | W. Shaw* | 1,856 | 58.5 | +11.0 |
| Conservative | R. E. Doweck | 1,211 | 38.2 | −7.6 |
| Union Movement | D. S. Lawson | 83 | 2.6 | −2.1 |
| Residents | A. W. King | 20 | 0.7 | −1.3 |
| Majority | | 645 | 20.3 | +18.6 |
| Turnout | | 3,170 | | |
| Labour hold | | Swing | | |

== See also ==
- Manchester City Council
- Manchester City Council elections
