= 1901 Manchester City Council election =

Local election in Manchester

- 1 November 1901

26 of 104 seats to Manchester City Council 53 seats needed for a majority
| | First party | Second party | Third party |
|---|---|---|---|
| Party | Conservative | Liberal | Liberal Unionist |
| Last election | 12 seats, 43.6% | 10 seats, 32.8% | 0 seats, 0.0% |
| Seats before | 51 | 46 | 3 |
| Seats won | 11 | 14 | 0 |
| Seats after | 52 | 45 | 3 |
| Seat change | ▲1 | ▼1 | Steady |
| Popular vote | 4,995 | 1,723 | 0 |
| Percentage | 53.2% | 18.4% | 0.0% |
| Swing | ▲9.6% | ▼14.4% | Steady |
| | Fourth party | Fifth party |
| Party | Labour | Independent |
| Last election | 2 seats, 23.6% | 0 seats, 0.0% |
| Seats before | 3 | 1 |
| Seats won | 0 | 1 |
| Seats after | 2 | 2 |
| Seat change | ▼1 | ▲1 |
| Popular vote | 1,536 | 1,130 |
| Percentage | 16.4% | 12.0% |
| Swing | ▼7.2% | ▲12.0% |
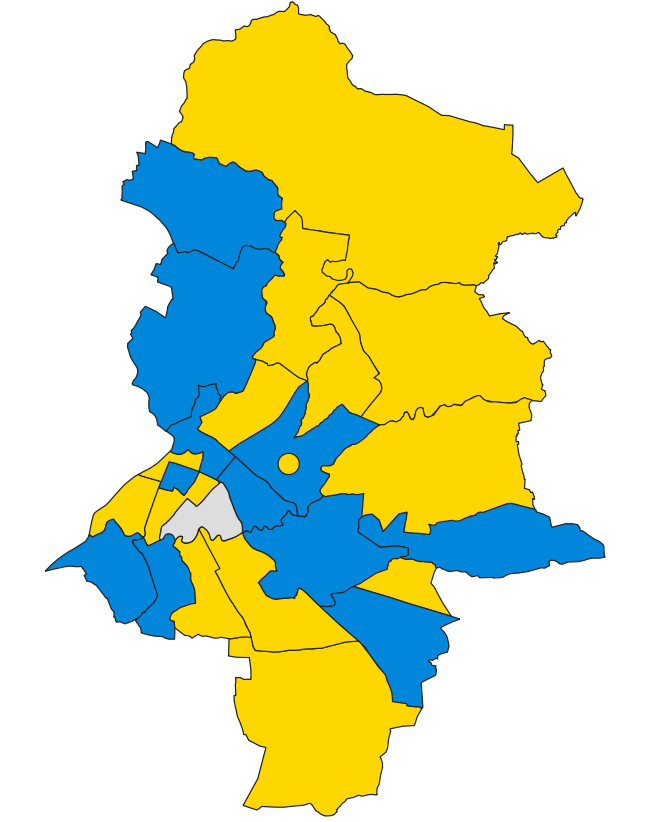
- Map of results of 1901 election
Leader of the Council before election
No overall control
Leader of the Council after election
No overall control

Elections to Manchester City Council were held on Friday, 1 November 1901. One third of the councillors seats were up for election, with each successful candidate to serve a three-year term of office. The council remained under no overall control.

== Election result ==
| Party | Votes | | Seats | | | Full Council | |
| Conservative Party | 4,995 (53.2%) | ▲9.6 | 11 (42.3%) | 11 / 26 | ▲1 | 52 (50.0%) | 52 / 104 |
| Liberal Party | 1,723 (18.4%) | ▼14.4 | 14 (56.0%) | 14 / 26 | ▼1 | 45 (43.3%) | 45 / 104 |
| Liberal Unionist | 0 (0.0%) | Steady | 0 (0.0%) | 0 / 26 | Steady | 3 (2.9%) | 3 / 104 |
| Labour Party | 1,536 (16.4%) | ▼7.2 | 0 (0.0%) | 0 / 26 | ▼1 | 2 (1.9%) | 2 / 104 |
| Independent | 1,130 (12.0%) | ▲12.0 | 1 (3.8%) | 1 / 26 | ▲1 | 2 (1.9%) | 2 / 104 |

=== Full council ===
↓
| 2 | 45 | 2 | 3 | 52 |

=== Aldermen ===
↓
| 15 | 3 | 8 |

=== Councillors ===
↓
| 2 | 30 | 2 | 44 |

== Ward results ==
=== All Saints' ===
All Saints'
| Party | Candidate | Votes | % | ±% |
|---|---|---|---|---|
| Liberal | M. Arrandale* | uncontested | | |
| Liberal hold | | Swing | | |

=== Ardwick ===
Ardwick
| Party | Candidate | Votes | % | ±% |
|---|---|---|---|---|
| Conservative | S. Chesters Thompson* | 1,705 | 69.2 | +14.8 |
| Independent | R. Hughes | 758 | 30.8 | N/A |
| Majority | | 947 | 38.4 | +29.6 |
| Turnout | | 2,463 | | |
| Conservative hold | | Swing | | |

=== Blackley and Moston ===
Blackley and Moston
| Party | Candidate | Votes | % | ±% |
|---|---|---|---|---|
| Liberal | J. Ward* | uncontested | | |
| Liberal hold | | Swing | | |

=== Bradford ===
Bradford
| Party | Candidate | Votes | % | ±% |
|---|---|---|---|---|
| Liberal | H. Grimshaw* | uncontested | | |
| Liberal hold | | Swing | | |

=== Cheetham ===
Cheetham
| Party | Candidate | Votes | % | ±% |
|---|---|---|---|---|
| Conservative | J. Williams | 1,225 | 57.2 | +12.6 |
| Liberal | W. Bennett | 916 | 42.8 | −12.6 |
| Majority | | 309 | 14.4 | |
| Turnout | | 2,141 | | |
| Conservative gain from Liberal | | Swing | | |

=== Collegiate Church ===
Collegiate Church
| Party | Candidate | Votes | % | ±% |
|---|---|---|---|---|
| Conservative | J. R. Smith* | uncontested | | |
| Conservative hold | | Swing | | |

=== Crumpsall ===
Crumpsall
| Party | Candidate | Votes | % | ±% |
|---|---|---|---|---|
| Conservative | W. F. Dearden* | uncontested | | |
| Conservative hold | | Swing | | |

=== Exchange ===
Exchange
| Party | Candidate | Votes | % | ±% |
|---|---|---|---|---|
| Liberal | S. Cowan* | uncontested | | |
| Liberal hold | | Swing | | |

=== Harpurhey ===
Harpurhey
| Party | Candidate | Votes | % | ±% |
|---|---|---|---|---|
| Liberal | P. Whyman* | uncontested | | |
| Liberal hold | | Swing | | |

=== Longsight ===
Longsight
| Party | Candidate | Votes | % | ±% |
|---|---|---|---|---|
| Conservative | J. R. Wilson* | uncontested | | |
| Conservative hold | | Swing | | |

=== Medlock Street ===
Medlock Street
| Party | Candidate | Votes | % | ±% |
|---|---|---|---|---|
| Conservative | W. H. Hesketh* | uncontested | | |
| Conservative hold | | Swing | | |

=== Miles Platting ===
Miles Platting
| Party | Candidate | Votes | % | ±% |
|---|---|---|---|---|
| Liberal | J. Bowes* | uncontested | | |
| Liberal hold | | Swing | | |

=== New Cross ===
New Cross
| Party | Candidate | Votes | % | ±% |
|---|---|---|---|---|
| Conservative | J. Grime* | uncontested | | |
| Liberal | G. Howarth* | uncontested | | |
| Conservative hold | | Swing | | |
| Liberal hold | | Swing | | |

=== Newton Heath ===
Newton Heath
| Party | Candidate | Votes | % | ±% |
|---|---|---|---|---|
| Liberal | W. Trevor* | uncontested | | |
| Liberal hold | | Swing | | |

=== Openshaw ===
Openshaw
| Party | Candidate | Votes | % | ±% |
|---|---|---|---|---|
| Conservative | D. Taylor* | uncontested | | |
| Conservative hold | | Swing | | |

=== Oxford ===
Oxford
| Party | Candidate | Votes | % | ±% |
|---|---|---|---|---|
| Independent | J. Pitt Hardacre | 372 | 52.3 | N/A |
| Liberal | J. H. Greenhow* | 339 | 47.7 | −0.4 |
| Majority | | 33 | 4.6 | |
| Turnout | | 711 | | |
| Independent gain from Liberal | | Swing | | |

=== Rusholme ===
Rusholme
| Party | Candidate | Votes | % | ±% |
|---|---|---|---|---|
| Liberal | H. Plummer* | uncontested | | |
| Liberal hold | | Swing | | |

=== St. Ann's ===
St. Ann's
| Party | Candidate | Votes | % | ±% |
|---|---|---|---|---|
| Conservative | J. Fildes* | uncontested | | |
| Conservative hold | | Swing | | |

=== St. Clement's ===
St. Clement's
| Party | Candidate | Votes | % | ±% |
|---|---|---|---|---|
| Conservative | T. Hassall* | uncontested | | |
| Conservative hold | | Swing | | |

=== St. George's ===
St. George's
| Party | Candidate | Votes | % | ±% |
|---|---|---|---|---|
| Conservative | W. Kay | 1,613 | 51.2 | N/A |
| Labour | J. Johnston* | 1,536 | 48.8 | N/A |
| Majority | | 77 | 2.4 | N/A |
| Turnout | | 3,149 | | |
| Conservative gain from Labour | | Swing | | |

=== St. James' ===
St. James'
| Party | Candidate | Votes | % | ±% |
|---|---|---|---|---|
| Liberal | H. J. Goldschmidt* | uncontested | | |
| Liberal hold | | Swing | | |

=== St. John's ===
St. John's
| Party | Candidate | Votes | % | ±% |
|---|---|---|---|---|
| Liberal | T. C. Abbott | 468 | 50.9 | +2.4 |
| Conservative | H. Shuttleworth* | 452 | 49.1 | −2.4 |
| Majority | | 16 | 1.8 | |
| Turnout | | 920 | | |
| Liberal gain from Conservative | | Swing | | |

=== St. Luke's ===
St. Luke's
| Party | Candidate | Votes | % | ±% |
|---|---|---|---|---|
| Liberal | C. O'Doherty* | uncontested | | |
| Liberal hold | | Swing | | |

=== St. Mark's ===
St. Mark's
| Party | Candidate | Votes | % | ±% |
|---|---|---|---|---|
| Conservative | W. H. Beastow* | uncontested | | |
| Conservative hold | | Swing | | |

=== St. Michael's ===
St. Michael's
| Party | Candidate | Votes | % | ±% |
|---|---|---|---|---|
| Liberal | D. McCabe* | uncontested | | |
| Liberal hold | | Swing | | |

== Aldermanic elections ==
=== Aldermanic election, 9 November 1901 ===
At the meeting of the council on 9 November 1901, the terms of office of thirteen aldermen expired.

The following thirteen were elected as aldermen by the council on 9 November 1901 for a term of six years.

| Party | Alderman | Ward | Term expires |
|---|---|---|---|
| Conservative | Thomas Briggs | | 1907 |
| Liberal | Robert Gibson* | | 1907 |
| Conservative | John Grantham* | | 1907 |
| Liberal Unionist | John Hopkinson* | | 1907 |
| Liberal Unionist | John King* | | 1907 |
| Liberal | Sir Bosdin Leech* | | 1907 |
| Liberal | Alexander McDougall* | All Saints' | 1907 |
| Liberal Unionist | Harry Rawson* | | 1907 |
| Conservative | Richard Lovatt Reade* | | 1907 |
| Conservative | John Richards* | | 1907 |
| Liberal | James Wilson Southern* | St. Luke's | 1907 |
| Liberal | G. T. Stanley* | Blackley & Moston | 1907 |
| Liberal | Joseph Thompson* | Ardwick | 1907 |

=== Aldermanic election, 9 April 1902 ===
Caused by the death on 14 March 1902 of Alderman John Hopkinson (Liberal Unionist, elected as an alderman by the council on 4 September 1872).

In his place, Councillor Daniel McCabe (Liberal, St. Michael's, elected 1 November 1889) was elected as an alderman by the council on 9 April 1902.

| Party | Alderman | Ward | Term expires |
|---|---|---|---|
| Liberal | Daniel McCabe | | 1907 |

== By-elections between 1901 and 1902 ==
=== By-elections, 25 November 1901 ===
Two by-elections were held on 25 November 1901 to fill vacancies which had arisen in the city council.

==== Medlock Street ====
Caused by the death of Councillor Wilkinson Kemp (Conservative, Medlock Street, elected 27 February 1899) on 6 November 1901.

Medlock Street
| Party | Candidate | Votes | % | ±% |
|---|---|---|---|---|
| Conservative | A. W. Chapman | 1,495 | 53.5 | N/A |
| Liberal | R. Carhart | 1,301 | 46.5 | N/A |
| Majority | | 194 | 7.0 | N/A |
| Turnout | | 2,796 | | |
| Conservative hold | | Swing | | |

==== Blackley and Moston ====
Caused by the election as an alderman of Councillor Thomas Briggs (Conservative, Blackley & Moston, elected 1 November 1890) on 9 November 1901 following the resignation on 9 November 1901 of Alderman Samuel Ashcroft (Conservative, elected as an alderman by the council on 12 June 1895).

Blackley and Moston
| Party | Candidate | Votes | % | ±% |
|---|---|---|---|---|
| Conservative | T. Wilson | 1,004 | 40.5 | N/A |
| Labour | J. Johnston | 741 | 29.9 | N/A |
| Liberal | J. Singleton | 735 | 29.6 | N/A |
| Majority | | 263 | 10.6 | N/A |
| Turnout | | 2,480 | | |
| Conservative hold | | Swing | | |

=== Ardwick, 23 December 1901 ===
Caused by the death of Councillor William Pollitt (Conservative, Ardwick, elected 1 November 1893) on 4 December 1901.

Ardwick
| Party | Candidate | Votes | % | ±% |
|---|---|---|---|---|
| Conservative | J. Stewart | 1,013 | 62.0 | −7.2 |
| Liberal | S. H. Cox | 620 | 38.0 | N/A |
| Majority | | 393 | 24.0 | −14.4 |
| Turnout | | 1,633 | | |
| Conservative hold | | Swing | | |

=== St. Mark's, 27 January 1902 ===
Caused by the resignation of Councillor John Phythian (Conservative, St. Mark's, elected 1 November 1893) on 4 January 1902.

St. Mark's
| Party | Candidate | Votes | % | ±% |
|---|---|---|---|---|
| Liberal | J. Allison | 853 | 54.6 | N/A |
| Conservative | G. Jennison | 708 | 45.4 | N/A |
| Majority | | 145 | 9.2 | N/A |
| Turnout | | 1,561 | | |
| Liberal gain from Conservative | | Swing | | |

=== St. Michael's, 28 April 1902 ===
Caused by the election as an alderman of Councillor Daniel McCabe (Liberal, St. Michael's, elected 1 November 1889) on 9 April 1902 following the death on 14 March 1902 of Alderman John Hopkinson (Liberal Unionist, elected as an alderman by the council on 4 September 1872).

St. Michael's
| Party | Candidate | Votes | % | ±% |
|---|---|---|---|---|
| Conservative | A. Hibbert | 1,342 | 52.3 | N/A |
| Liberal | F. J. Farley | 1,226 | 47.7 | N/A |
| Majority | | 116 | 4.6 | N/A |
| Turnout | | 2,568 | | |
| Conservative gain from Liberal | | Swing | | |

=== Blackley and Moston, 28 July 1902 ===
Caused by the death of Councillor Thomas Wilson (Conservative, Blackley & Moston, elected 25 November 1901) on 7 July 1902.

Blackley and Moston
| Party | Candidate | Votes | % | ±% |
|---|---|---|---|---|
| Labour | J. Johnston | 1,088 | 52.9 | +23.0 |
| Conservative | B. A. Redfern | 967 | 47.1 | +6.6 |
| Majority | | 121 | 5.8 | |
| Turnout | | 2,055 | | |
| Labour gain from Conservative | | Swing | | |
