= 1906 Manchester City Council election =

Local election in Manchester

- 1 November 1906

31 of 124 seats to Manchester City Council 63 seats needed for a majority
	First party	Second party	Third party
Party	Conservative	Liberal	Labour
Last election	12 seats, 44.2%	14 seats, 28.1%	5 seats, 22.8%
Seats before	51	56	13
Seats won	16	10	4
Seats after	54	54	12
Seat change	▲3	▼2	▼1
Popular vote	16,640	8,913	8,216
Percentage	49.3%	26.4%	24.3%
Swing	▲5.1%	▼1.7%	▲1.5%
	Fourth party
Party	Independent
Last election	0 seats, 3.4%
Seats before	4
Seats won	1
Seats after	4
Seat change	Steady
Popular vote	0
Percentage	0.0%
Swing	▼3.4%
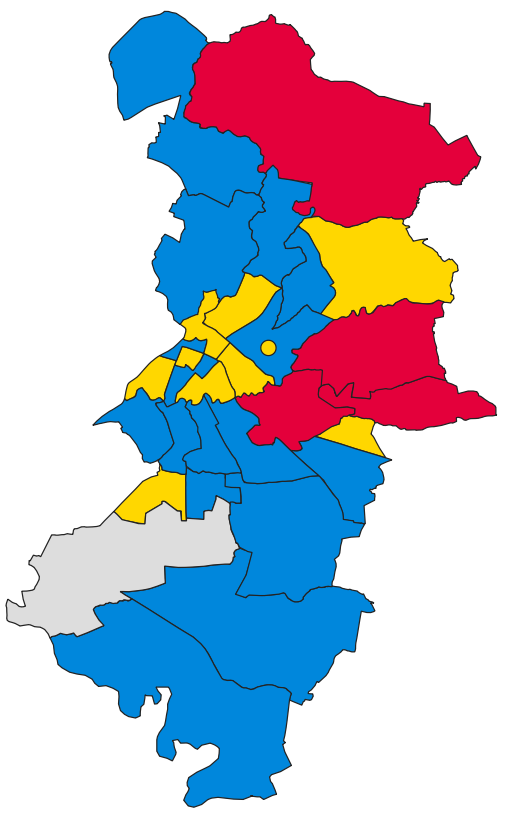
- Map of results of 1906 election
Leader of the Council before election
No overall control
Leader of the Council after election
No overall control

Elections to Manchester City Council were held on Thursday, 1 November 1906. One third of the councillors seats were up for election, with each successful candidate to serve a three-year term of office. The council remained under no overall control.

== Election result ==
Party	Votes		Seats			Full Council	
Conservative Party	16,640 (49.3%)	▲5.1	16 (51.6%)	16 / 31	▲3	54 (43.5%)	54 / 124
Liberal Party	8,913 (26.4%)	▼1.7	10 (32.3%)	10 / 31	▼2	54 (43.5%)	54 / 124
Labour Party	8,216 (24.3%)	▲1.5	4 (12.9%)	4 / 31	▼1	12 (9.7%)	12 / 124
Independent	0 (0.0%)	▼3.4	1 (3.2%)	1 / 31	Steady	4 (3.2%)	4 / 124

=== Full council ===
↓
12	54	4	54

=== Aldermen ===
↓
20	11

=== Councillors ===
↓
12	34	4	43

== Ward results ==
=== All Saints' ===
All Saints'
Party	Candidate	Votes	%	±%
Conservative	C. Hornby*	uncontested		
Conservative hold		Swing		

=== Ardwick ===
Ardwick
Party	Candidate	Votes	%	±%
Labour	J. Doyle*	1,488	52.6	+19.4
Conservative	J. W. White	1,341	47.4	−19.4
Majority		147	5.2	
Turnout		2,829		
Labour hold		Swing		

=== Blackley and Moston ===
Blackley and Moston
Party	Candidate	Votes	%	±%
Labour	J. Johnston*	uncontested		
Labour hold		Swing		

=== Bradford ===
Bradford
Party	Candidate	Votes	%	±%
Labour	J. E. Sutton*	uncontested		
Labour hold		Swing		

=== Cheetham ===
Cheetham
Party	Candidate	Votes	%	±%
Conservative	C. A. Wood	1,488	53.1	N/A
Liberal	A. Porter*	1,312	46.9	N/A
Majority		176	6.2	N/A
Turnout		2,800		
Conservative gain from Liberal		Swing		

=== Chorlton-cum-Hardy ===
Chorlton-cum-Hardy
Party	Candidate	Votes	%	±%
Independent	E. Farrar*	uncontested		
Independent hold		Swing		

=== Collegiate Church ===
Collegiate Church
Party	Candidate	Votes	%	±%
Liberal	J. Royle*	uncontested		
Liberal hold		Swing		

=== Crumpsall ===
Crumpsall
Party	Candidate	Votes	%	±%
Conservative	F. Todd*	uncontested		
Conservative hold		Swing		

=== Didsbury ===
Didsbury
Party	Candidate	Votes	%	±%
Conservative	C. K. Mayor*	uncontested		
Conservative hold		Swing		

=== Exchange ===
Exchange
Party	Candidate	Votes	%	±%
Conservative	J. Makeague*	uncontested		
Conservative hold		Swing		

=== Harpurhey ===
Harpurhey
Party	Candidate	Votes	%	±%
Conservative	J. Hargreaves	2,170	50.3	−4.5
Labour	W. T. Jackson*	2,147	49.7	+4.5
Majority		23	0.6	−9.0
Turnout		4,317		
Conservative gain from Labour		Swing		

=== Longsight ===
Longsight
Party	Candidate	Votes	%	±%
Conservative	J. Jones*	1,098	58.1	+20.0
Labour	R. McDonald	792	41.9	N/A
Majority		306	16.2	
Turnout		1,890		
Conservative hold		Swing		

=== Medlock Street ===
Medlock Street
Party	Candidate	Votes	%	±%
Conservative	A. W. Chapman*	1,975	87.7	+38.8
Liberal	P. Cohen	277	12.3	−38.8
Majority		1,698	75.4	
Turnout		2,252		
Conservative hold		Swing		

=== Miles Platting ===
Miles Platting
Party	Candidate	Votes	%	±%
Conservative	S. Dixon*	1,294	56.6	+13.3
Labour	F. Lowe	992	43.4	−13.3
Majority		302	13.2	
Turnout		2,286		
Conservative hold		Swing		

=== Moss Side East ===
Moss Side East
Party	Candidate	Votes	%	±%
Conservative	W. T. Dagnall*	1,057	62.3	N/A
Liberal	C. Green	639	37.7	N/A
Majority		418	24.6	N/A
Turnout		1,696		
Conservative hold		Swing		

=== Moss Side West ===
Moss Side West
Party	Candidate	Votes	%	±%
Liberal	T. Herbert*	uncontested		
Liberal hold		Swing		

=== New Cross ===
New Cross
Party	Candidate	Votes	%	±%
Conservative	J. Wallwork	2,517	58.2	+5.2
Liberal	D. Boyle*	2,109	48.8	+0.1
Liberal	J. Simpson*	1,505	34.8	−13.9
Majority		604	14.0	
Turnout		4,324		
Conservative gain from Liberal		Swing		
Liberal hold		Swing		

=== Newton Heath ===
Newton Heath
Party	Candidate	Votes	%	±%
Liberal	W. Butterworth*	1,147	50.5	N/A
Labour	J. D. Sutcliffe	1,124	49.5	−1.6
Majority		23	1.0	
Turnout		2,271		
Liberal hold		Swing		

=== Openshaw ===
Openshaw
Party	Candidate	Votes	%	±%
Labour	T. Cook*	uncontested		
Labour hold		Swing		

=== Oxford ===
Oxford
Party	Candidate	Votes	%	±%
Liberal	C. Behrens*	uncontested		
Liberal hold		Swing		

=== Rusholme ===
Rusholme
Party	Candidate	Votes	%	±%
Conservative	G. K. Ashton*	uncontested		
Conservative hold		Swing		

=== St. Ann's ===
St. Ann's
Party	Candidate	Votes	%	±%
Liberal	T. C. Abbott*	uncontested		
Liberal hold		Swing		

=== St. Clement's ===
St. Clement's
Party	Candidate	Votes	%	±%
Liberal	J. Harrop*	uncontested		
Liberal hold		Swing		

=== St. George's ===
St. George's
Party	Candidate	Votes	%	±%
Conservative	J. H. Swales	1,229	42.7	N/A
Liberal	T. Kennaugh	1,138	39.5	N/A
Labour	T. A. Flynn	514	17.8	N/A
Majority		91	3.2	N/A
Turnout		2,881		
Conservative hold		Swing		

=== St. James' ===
St. James'
Party	Candidate	Votes	%	±%
Conservative	T. T. Shann*	uncontested		
Conservative hold		Swing		

=== St. John's ===
St. John's
Party	Candidate	Votes	%	±%
Liberal	W. Barton	424	54.4	N/A
Conservative	J. B. Langley	355	45.6	N/A
Majority		69	8.8	N/A
Turnout		779		
Liberal gain from Conservative		Swing		

=== St. Luke's ===
St. Luke's
Party	Candidate	Votes	%	±%
Conservative	J. Johnson	1,574	57.6	N/A
Labour	T. Park	1,159	42.4	N/A
Majority		415	15.2	N/A
Turnout		2,733		
Conservative gain from Liberal		Swing		

=== St. Mark's ===
St. Mark's
Party	Candidate	Votes	%	±%
Liberal	R. Turner*	uncontested		
Liberal hold		Swing		

=== St. Michael's ===
St. Michael's
Party	Candidate	Votes	%	±%
Liberal	T. Quinn Ruddin*	uncontested		
Liberal hold		Swing		

=== Withington ===
Withington
Party	Candidate	Votes	%	±%
Conservative	H. Derwent Simpson*	542	60.0	+22.7
Liberal	H. Vick	362	40.0	+3.6
Majority		180	20.0	+19.1
Turnout		904		
Conservative hold		Swing		

== Aldermanic elections ==
=== Aldermanic election, 20 March 1907 ===
Caused by the death on 8 March 1907 of Alderman John Grantham (Conservative, elected as an alderman by the council on 6 June 1894).

In his place, Councillor James Fildes (Conservative, St. Ann's, elected 1 November 1892) was elected as an alderman by the council on 20 March 1907.

Party	Alderman	Ward	Term expires
Conservative	James Fildes	Openshaw	1907

== By-elections between 1906 and 1907 ==
=== St. James', 17 January 1907 ===
Caused by the death of Councillor Henry Samson (Conservative, St. James', elected 7 August 1888) on 26 December 1906.

St. James'
Party	Candidate	Votes	%	±%
Conservative	S. W. Royse	uncontested		
Conservative hold		Swing		

=== St. Ann's, 3 April 1907 ===
Caused by the election as an alderman of Councillor James Fildes (Conservative, St. Ann's, elected 1 November 1892) on 20 March 1907 following the death on 8 March 1907 of Alderman John Grantham (Conservative, elected as an alderman by the council on 6 June 1894).

St. Ann's
Party	Candidate	Votes	%	±%
Liberal	T. Stephens	458	53.8	N/A
Conservative	J. Earnshaw	394	46.2	N/A
Majority		64	7.6	N/A
Turnout		852		
Liberal gain from Conservative		Swing		

=== Moss Side West, 26 April 1907 ===
Caused by the death of Councillor Thomas Herbert (Liberal, Moss Side West, elected 1 November 1904) on 8 April 1907.

Moss Side West
Party	Candidate	Votes	%	±%
Conservative	W. Flanagan	940	52.4	N/A
Liberal	A. Porter	699	39.0	N/A
Labour	R. Robinson	154	8.6	N/A
Majority		241	13.4	N/A
Turnout		1,793		
Conservative gain from Liberal		Swing		

=== Crumpsall, 14 May 1907 ===
Caused by the death of Councillor George Hudson Rawsthorn (Liberal, Crumpsall, elected 1 November 1905) on 21 April 1907.

Crumpsall
Party	Candidate	Votes	%	±%
Conservative	F. J. Robertshaw	654	60.4	N/A
Liberal	J. Weedall	428	39.6	N/A
Majority		226	20.8	N/A
Turnout		1,082		
Conservative gain from Liberal		Swing		
