= 1903 Manchester City Council election =

Local election in Manchester

- 2 November 1903

26 of 104 seats to Manchester City Council 53 seats needed for a majority
| | First party | Second party | Third party |
|---|---|---|---|
| Party | Conservative | Liberal | Labour |
| Last election | 16 seats, 46.7% | 9 seats, 33.4% | 1 seats, 13.3% |
| Seats before | 52 | 44 | 4 |
| Seats won | 11 | 10 | 4 |
| Seats after | 51 | 44 | 5 |
| Seat change | ▼1 | Steady | ▲1 |
| Popular vote | 14,329 | 12,012 | 8,396 |
| Percentage | 35.9% | 30.1% | 21.0% |
| Swing | ▼10.8% | ▼3.3% | ▲7.7% |
| | Fourth party | Fifth party |
| Party | Independent | Liberal Unionist |
| Last election | 0 seats, 6.6% | 0 seats, 0.0% |
| Seats before | 2 | 2 |
| Seats won | 1 | 0 |
| Seats after | 2 | 2 |
| Seat change | Steady | Steady |
| Popular vote | 5,098 | 1,592 |
| Percentage | 12.8% | 4.0% |
| Swing | ▲6.2% | ▲4.0% |
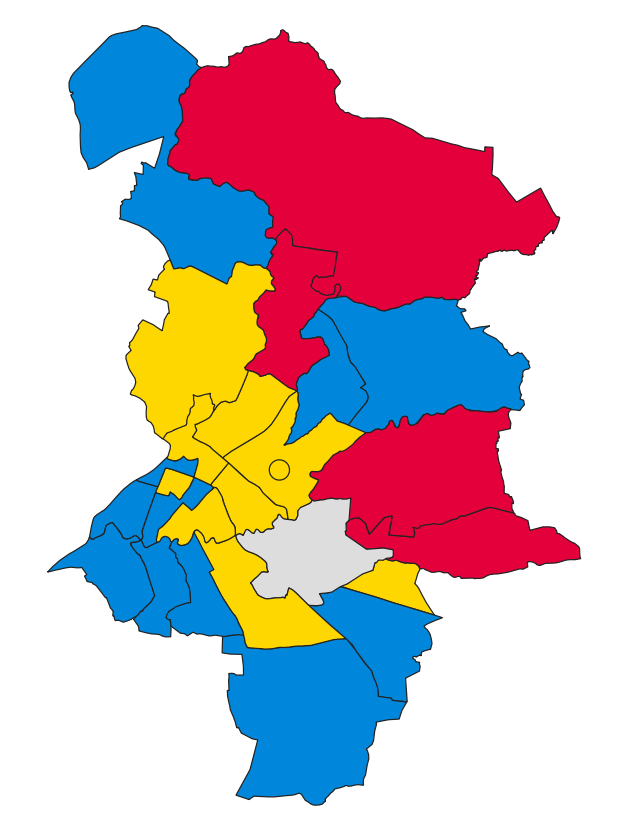
- Map of results of 1903 election
Leader of the Council before election
No overall control
Leader of the Council after election
No overall control

Elections to Manchester City Council were held on Monday, 2 November 1903. One third of the councillors seats were up for election, with each successful candidate to serve a three-year term of office. The council remained under no overall control.

== Election result ==
| Party | Votes | | Seats | | | Full Council | |
| Conservative Party | 14,329 (35.9%) | ▼10.8 | 11 (42.3%) | 11 / 26 | ▼1 | 51 (49.0%) | 51 / 104 |
| Liberal Party | 12,012 (30.1%) | ▼3.3 | 10 (38.5%) | 10 / 26 | Steady | 44 (42.3%) | 44 / 104 |
| Labour Party | 8,396 (21.0%) | ▲7.7 | 4 (15.4%) | 4 / 26 | ▲1 | 5 (4.8%) | 5 / 104 |
| Independent | 5,098 (12.8%) | ▲6.2 | 1 (3.8%) | 1 / 26 | Steady | 2 (1.9%) | 2 / 104 |
| Liberal Unionist | 1,592 (4.0%) | ▲4.0 | 0 (0.0%) | 0 / 26 | Steady | 2 (1.9%) | 2 / 104 |
| Independent Conservative | 86 (0.2%) | N/A | 0 (0.0%) | 0 / 26 | N/A | 0 (0.0%) | 0 / 104 |

=== Full council ===
↓
| 5 | 44 | 2 | 2 | 51 |

=== Aldermen ===
↓
| 15 | 2 | 9 |

=== Councillors ===
↓
| 5 | 29 | 2 | 42 |

== Ward results ==
=== All Saints' ===
All Saints'
| Party | Candidate | Votes | % | ±% |
|---|---|---|---|---|
| Conservative | C. Hornby* | uncontested | | |
| Conservative hold | | Swing | | |

=== Ardwick ===
Ardwick
| Party | Candidate | Votes | % | ±% |
|---|---|---|---|---|
| Independent | R. Hughes | 2,368 | 54.0 | +4.1 |
| Conservative | W. Hyde | 1,932 | 44.0 | −6.1 |
| Ind. Conservative | J. W. White | 86 | 2.0 | N/A |
| Majority | | 436 | 10.0 | |
| Turnout | | 4,386 | | |
| Independent gain from Conservative | | Swing | | |

=== Blackley and Moston ===
Blackley and Moston
| Party | Candidate | Votes | % | ±% |
|---|---|---|---|---|
| Labour | J. Johnston* | 1,402 | 52.9 | N/A |
| Conservative | G. H. Radcliffe | 1,250 | 47.1 | +0.7 |
| Majority | | 152 | 5.8 | |
| Turnout | | 2,652 | | |
| Labour hold | | Swing | | |

=== Bradford ===
Bradford
| Party | Candidate | Votes | % | ±% |
|---|---|---|---|---|
| Labour | J. E. Sutton* | 2,924 | 73.8 | +27.7 |
| Independent | G. W. Laughton | 1,038 | 26.2 | N/A |
| Majority | | 1,886 | 47.6 | |
| Turnout | | 3,962 | | |
| Labour hold | | Swing | | |

=== Cheetham ===
Cheetham
| Party | Candidate | Votes | % | ±% |
|---|---|---|---|---|
| Liberal | J. Halliday* | uncontested | | |
| Liberal hold | | Swing | | |

=== Collegiate Church ===
Collegiate Church
| Party | Candidate | Votes | % | ±% |
|---|---|---|---|---|
| Liberal | J. Royle* | uncontested | | |
| Liberal hold | | Swing | | |

=== Crumpsall ===
Crumpsall
| Party | Candidate | Votes | % | ±% |
|---|---|---|---|---|
| Conservative | E. Holt* | uncontested | | |
| Conservative hold | | Swing | | |

=== Exchange ===
Exchange
| Party | Candidate | Votes | % | ±% |
|---|---|---|---|---|
| Conservative | J. Makeague | 449 | 68.0 | N/A |
| Independent | F. Moss* | 211 | 32.0 | N/A |
| Majority | | 238 | 36.0 | N/A |
| Turnout | | 660 | | |
| Conservative gain from Independent | | Swing | | |

=== Harpurhey ===
Harpurhey
| Party | Candidate | Votes | % | ±% |
|---|---|---|---|---|
| Labour | W. T. Jackson | 2,305 | 55.4 | +14.1 |
| Conservative | C. Smith | 1,852 | 44.6 | −14.1 |
| Majority | | 453 | 10.8 | |
| Turnout | | 4,157 | | |
| Labour hold | | Swing | | |

=== Longsight ===
Longsight
| Party | Candidate | Votes | % | ±% |
|---|---|---|---|---|
| Conservative | J. Jones* | uncontested | | |
| Conservative hold | | Swing | | |

=== Medlock Street ===
Medlock Street
| Party | Candidate | Votes | % | ±% |
|---|---|---|---|---|
| Conservative | A. W. Chapman* | 1,610 | 59.0 | +10.2 |
| Liberal | G. Macfarlane | 1,119 | 41.0 | −10.2 |
| Majority | | 491 | 18.0 | |
| Turnout | | 2,729 | | |
| Conservative hold | | Swing | | |

=== Miles Platting ===
Miles Platting
| Party | Candidate | Votes | % | ±% |
|---|---|---|---|---|
| Conservative | S. Dixon* | 1,201 | 57.0 | N/A |
| Independent | G. Stephenson | 907 | 43.0 | N/A |
| Majority | | 294 | 14.0 | N/A |
| Turnout | | 2,108 | | |
| Conservative hold | | Swing | | |

=== New Cross ===
New Cross
| Party | Candidate | Votes | % | ±% |
|---|---|---|---|---|
| Liberal | D. Boyle* | 2,817 | 58.3 | +9.8 |
| Liberal | J. Simpson* | 2,526 | 52.2 | +3.7 |
| Conservative | J. Burgess | 2,163 | 44.7 | −8.6 |
| Majority | | 363 | 7.5 | +3.7 |
| Turnout | | 4,835 | | |
| Liberal hold | | Swing | | |
| Liberal hold | | Swing | | |

=== Newton Heath ===
Newton Heath
| Party | Candidate | Votes | % | ±% |
|---|---|---|---|---|
| Conservative | J. Garlick* | uncontested | | |
| Conservative hold | | Swing | | |

=== Openshaw ===
Openshaw
| Party | Candidate | Votes | % | ±% |
|---|---|---|---|---|
| Labour | T. Cook | 1,765 | 60.7 | +8.0 |
| Conservative | J. Pollitt* | 1,142 | 39.3 | −8.0 |
| Majority | | 623 | 21.4 | +16.0 |
| Turnout | | 2,907 | | |
| Labour gain from Conservative | | Swing | | |

=== Oxford ===
Oxford
| Party | Candidate | Votes | % | ±% |
|---|---|---|---|---|
| Liberal | C. Behrens | uncontested | | |
| Liberal gain from Conservative | | Swing | | |

=== Rusholme ===
Rusholme
| Party | Candidate | Votes | % | ±% |
|---|---|---|---|---|
| Conservative | G. K. Ashton* | uncontested | | |
| Conservative hold | | Swing | | |

=== St. Ann's ===
St. Ann's
| Party | Candidate | Votes | % | ±% |
|---|---|---|---|---|
| Liberal | R. G. Lawson* | uncontested | | |
| Liberal hold | | Swing | | |

=== St. Clement's ===
St. Clement's
| Party | Candidate | Votes | % | ±% |
|---|---|---|---|---|
| Liberal | J. Harrop* | uncontested | | |
| Liberal hold | | Swing | | |

=== St. George's ===
St. George's
| Party | Candidate | Votes | % | ±% |
|---|---|---|---|---|
| Conservative | J. A. Mackay | 1,467 | 51.5 | −12.6 |
| Liberal | J. Green | 1,383 | 48.5 | +12.6 |
| Majority | | 84 | 3.0 | −25.2 |
| Turnout | | 2,850 | | |
| Conservative gain from Liberal | | Swing | | |

=== St. James' ===
St. James'
| Party | Candidate | Votes | % | ±% |
|---|---|---|---|---|
| Conservative | T. T. Shann* | uncontested | | |
| Conservative hold | | Swing | | |

=== St. John's ===
St. John's
| Party | Candidate | Votes | % | ±% |
|---|---|---|---|---|
| Conservative | J. Ingle* | uncontested | | |
| Conservative hold | | Swing | | |

=== St. Luke's ===
St. Luke's
| Party | Candidate | Votes | % | ±% |
|---|---|---|---|---|
| Liberal | A. H. Scott* | 1,683 | 51.4 | N/A |
| Liberal Unionist | J. Stevenson | 1,592 | 48.6 | N/A |
| Majority | | 91 | 2.8 | N/A |
| Turnout | | 3,275 | | |
| Liberal hold | | Swing | | |

=== St. Mark's ===
St. Mark's
| Party | Candidate | Votes | % | ±% |
|---|---|---|---|---|
| Liberal | W. H. Wainwright* | 966 | 62.7 | +3.2 |
| Independent | H. M. Ross Clyne | 574 | 37.3 | N/A |
| Majority | | 392 | 25.4 | +6.4 |
| Turnout | | 1,540 | | |
| Liberal hold | | Swing | | |

=== St. Michael's ===
St. Michael's
| Party | Candidate | Votes | % | ±% |
|---|---|---|---|---|
| Liberal | T. Quinn Ruddin* | 1,518 | 54.6 | +2.9 |
| Conservative | J. Johnson | 1,263 | 45.4 | +0.3 |
| Majority | | 255 | 9.2 | +2.6 |
| Turnout | | 2,781 | | |
| Liberal hold | | Swing | | |

== Aldermanic elections ==
=== Aldermanic election, 3 February 1904 ===
Caused by the death on 7 January 1904 of Alderman Harry Rawson (Liberal Unionist, elected as an alderman by the council on 1 August 1894).

In his place, Councillor Charles Jennison (Conservative, Longsight, elected 1 November 1890) was elected as an alderman by the council on 3 February 1904.

| Party | Alderman | Ward | Term expires |
|---|---|---|---|
| Conservative | Charles Jennison | St. Ann's | 1904 |

=== Aldermanic election, 13 April 1904 ===
Caused by the resignation on 16 March 1904 of Alderman G. T. Stanley (Liberal, elected as an alderman by the council on 10 November 1890).

In his place, Councillor John Ward (Liberal, Blackley and Moston, elected 1 November 1890) was elected as an alderman by the council on 13 April 1904.

| Party | Alderman | Ward | Term expires |
|---|---|---|---|
| Liberal | John Ward | Blackley & Moston | 1907 |

=== Aldermanic election, 3 August 1904 ===
Caused by the disqualification on 6 July 1904 of Alderman H. H. Mainwaring (Conservative, elected as an alderman by the council on 18 May 1898).

In his place, Councillor J. H. Wells (Liberal, St. Michael's, elected 1 November 1890) was elected as an alderman by the council on 3 August 1904.

| Party | Alderman | Ward | Term expires |
|---|---|---|---|
| Liberal | J. H. Wells | | 1904 |

== By-elections between 1903 and 1904 ==
=== Miles Platting, 18 November 1903 ===
Caused by the election as an alderman of Councillor James Bowes (Liberal, Miles Platting, elected 1 November 1890) on 28 October 1903 following the resignation on 7 October 1903 of Alderman William Thomas Bax (Liberal, elected as an alderman by the council on 15 February 1899).

Miles Platting
| Party | Candidate | Votes | % | ±% |
|---|---|---|---|---|
| Liberal | J. Kemp | 1,357 | 62.2 | N/A |
| Independent | G. Stephenson | 824 | 37.8 | −5.2 |
| Majority | | 533 | 24.4 | |
| Turnout | | 2,181 | | |
| Liberal hold | | Swing | | |

=== By-elections, 16 February 1904 ===
Two by-elections were held on 16 February 1904 to fill vacancies which had arisen in the city council.

==== Bradford ====
Caused by the death of Councillor Harry Grimshaw (Liberal, Bradford, elected 19 August 1897) on 30 January 1904.

Bradford
| Party | Candidate | Votes | % | ±% |
|---|---|---|---|---|
| Labour | T. Fox | 2,231 | 62.7 | −11.1 |
| Liberal | A. Malcolm | 1,325 | 37.3 | N/A |
| Majority | | 906 | 25.4 | −22.2 |
| Turnout | | 3,556 | | |
| Labour gain from Liberal | | Swing | | |

==== Longsight ====
Caused by the election as an alderman of Councillor Charles Jennison (Conservative, Longsight, elected 1 November 1890) on 3 February 1904 following the death on 7 January 1904 of Alderman Harry Rawson (Liberal Unionist, elected as an alderman by the council on 1 August 1894).

Longsight
| Party | Candidate | Votes | % | ±% |
|---|---|---|---|---|
| Liberal | O. Heggs | 1,026 | 57.1 | N/A |
| Conservative | A. Jennison | 770 | 42.9 | N/A |
| Majority | | 256 | 14.2 | N/A |
| Turnout | | 1,796 | | |
| Liberal gain from Conservative | | Swing | | |

=== Blackley and Moston, 29 April 1904 ===
Caused by the election as an alderman of Councillor John Ward (Liberal, Blackley and Moston, elected 1 November 1890) on 13 April 1904 following the resignation on 16 March 1904 of Alderman G. T. Stanley (Liberal, elected as an alderman by the council on 10 November 1890).

Blackley and Moston
| Party | Candidate | Votes | % | ±% |
|---|---|---|---|---|
| Conservative | C. G. L. Skinner | 1,079 | 51.6 | +4.5 |
| Liberal | H. Rothwell | 1,013 | 48.4 | N/A |
| Majority | | 66 | 3.2 | |
| Turnout | | 2,092 | | |
| Conservative gain from Liberal | | Swing | | |

=== St. Michael's, 11 August 1904 ===
Caused by the election as an alderman of Councillor J. H. Wells (Liberal, St. Michael's, elected 1 November 1890) on 3 August 1904 following the disqualification on 6 July 1904 of Alderman H. H. Mainwaring (Conservative, elected as an alderman by the council on 18 May 1898).

St. Michael's
| Party | Candidate | Votes | % | ±% |
|---|---|---|---|---|
| Liberal | W. May | uncontested | | |
| Liberal hold | | Swing | | |
