= 1898 Manchester City Council election =

Local election in Manchester

- 1 November 1898

26 of 104 seats to Manchester City Council 53 seats needed for a majority
	First party	Second party	Third party
Party	Liberal	Conservative	Liberal Unionist
Last election	10 seats, 32.2%	12 seats, 45.9%	0 seats, 3.1%
Seats before	50	46	4
Seats won	14	11	0
Seats after	48	47	4
Seat change	▼2	▲1	Steady
Popular vote	8,164	11,837	0
Percentage	34.6%	50.2%	0.0%
Swing	▲2.4%	▲5.3%	▼3.1%
	Fourth party	Fifth party	Sixth party
Party	Ind. Labour Party	Independent	Social Democratic Federation
Last election	2 seats, 14.6%	1 seats, 0.9%	1 seats, 3.3%
Seats before	2	1	1
Seats won	1	0	0
Seats after	3	1	1
Seat change	▲1	Steady	Steady
Popular vote	3,076	518	0
Percentage	13.0%	2.2%	0.0%
Swing	▼1.6%	▲1.3%	▼3.3%
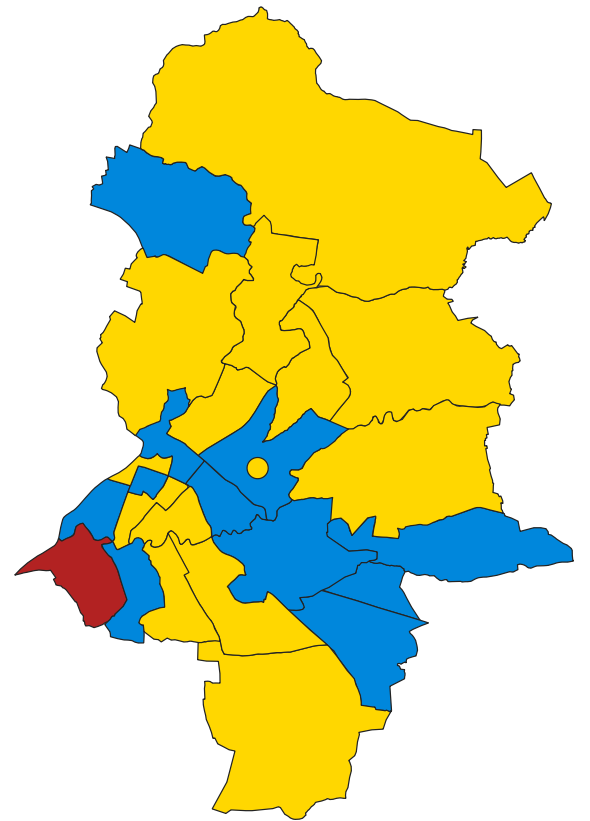
- Map of results of 1898 election
Leader of the Council before election
No overall control
Leader of the Council after election
No overall control

Elections to Manchester City Council were held on Tuesday, 1 November 1898. One third of the councillors seats were up for election, with each successful candidate to serve a three-year term of office. The council remained under no overall control.

== Election result ==
Party	Votes		Seats			Full Council	
Liberal Party	8,164 (34.6%)	▲2.4	14 (53.8%)	14 / 26	▼2	48 (46.2%)	48 / 104
Conservative Party	11,837 (50.2%)	▲4.3	11 (42.3%)	11 / 26	▲1	47 (45.2%)	47 / 104
Liberal Unionist	0 (0.0%)	▼3.1	0 (0.0%)	0 / 26	Steady	4 (3.8%)	4 / 104
Ind. Labour Party	3,076 (13.0%)	▼1.6	1 (3.8%)	1 / 26	▲1	3 (2.9%)	3 / 104
Independent	518 (2.2%)	▲1.3	0 (0.0%)	0 / 26	Steady	1 (1.0%)	1 / 104
Social Democratic Federation	0 (0.0%)	▼3.3	0 (0.0%)	0 / 26	Steady	1 (1.0%)	1 / 104

=== Full council ===
↓
1	3	48	1	4	47

=== Aldermen ===
↓
16	3	7

=== Councillors ===
↓
1	3	32	1	1	40

== Ward results ==
=== All Saints' ===
All Saints'
Party	Candidate	Votes	%	±%
Liberal	M. Arrandale*	uncontested		
Liberal hold		Swing		

=== Ardwick ===
Ardwick
Party	Candidate	Votes	%	±%
Conservative	S. Chesters Thompson*	uncontested		
Conservative hold		Swing		

=== Blackley and Moston ===
Blackley and Moston
Party	Candidate	Votes	%	±%
Liberal	J. Ward*	uncontested		
Liberal hold		Swing		

=== Bradford ===
Bradford
Party	Candidate	Votes	%	±%
Liberal	H. Grimshaw*	uncontested		
Liberal hold		Swing		

=== Cheetham ===
Cheetham
Party	Candidate	Votes	%	±%
Liberal	J. Hodge	715	63.6	N/A
Independent	T. Grindley	410	36.4	N/A
Majority		305	27.2	N/A
Turnout		1,125		
Liberal hold		Swing		

=== Collegiate Church ===
Collegiate Church
Party	Candidate	Votes	%	±%
Conservative	J. R. Smith	uncontested		
Conservative hold		Swing		

=== Crumpsall ===
Crumpsall
Party	Candidate	Votes	%	±%
Conservative	W. F. Dearden*	uncontested		
Conservative hold		Swing		

=== Exchange ===
Exchange
Party	Candidate	Votes	%	±%
Liberal	J. G. Batty*	uncontested		
Liberal hold		Swing		

=== Harpurhey ===
Harpurhey
Party	Candidate	Votes	%	±%
Liberal	P. Whyman*	2,452	55.9	N/A
Conservative	J. Hargreaves	1,826	41.6	−6.0
Independent	W. Brown	108	2.5	N/A
Majority		626	14.3	
Turnout		4,386		
Liberal hold		Swing		

=== Longsight ===
Longsight
Party	Candidate	Votes	%	±%
Conservative	J. R. Wilson*	uncontested		
Conservative hold		Swing		

=== Medlock Street ===
Medlock Street
Party	Candidate	Votes	%	±%
Conservative	W. H. Hesketh*	uncontested		
Conservative hold		Swing		

=== Miles Platting ===
Miles Platting
Party	Candidate	Votes	%	±%
Liberal	J. Bowes*	uncontested		
Liberal hold		Swing		

=== New Cross ===
New Cross
Party	Candidate	Votes	%	±%
Conservative	J. Grime	2,413	56.9	+8.7
Liberal	W. Birkbeck*	2,145	50.6	−11.2
Conservative	R. G. McCormick	1,984	46.8	−1.4
Liberal	R. Lloyd*	1,935	45.6	−16.2
Majority		161	3.8	+0.6
Turnout		4,239		
Conservative gain from Liberal		Swing		
Liberal hold		Swing		

=== Newton Heath ===
Newton Heath
Party	Candidate	Votes	%	±%
Liberal	W. Trevor*	uncontested		
Liberal hold		Swing		

=== Openshaw ===
Openshaw
Party	Candidate	Votes	%	±%
Conservative	D. Taylor*	1,589	60.0	+1.9
Ind. Labour Party	W. H. Taylor	1,061	40.0	−1.9
Majority		528	20.0	+3.8
Turnout		2,650		
Conservative hold		Swing		

=== Oxford ===
Oxford
Party	Candidate	Votes	%	±%
Liberal	J. H. Greenhow*	uncontested		
Liberal hold		Swing		

=== Rusholme ===
Rusholme
Party	Candidate	Votes	%	±%
Liberal	H. Plummer*	uncontested		
Liberal hold		Swing		

=== St. Ann's ===
St. Ann's
Party	Candidate	Votes	%	±%
Conservative	J. Fildes*	uncontested		
Conservative hold		Swing		

=== St. Clement's ===
St. Clement's
Party	Candidate	Votes	%	±%
Conservative	T. Hassall*	865	60.4	+14.0
Liberal	J. Johnson	567	39.6	−14.0
Majority		298	20.8	
Turnout		1,432		
Conservative hold		Swing		

=== St. George's ===
St. George's
Party	Candidate	Votes	%	±%
Ind. Labour Party	J. Johnston	1,595	54.7	N/A
Conservative	J. C. Nichol*	1,322	45.3	−1.4
Majority		273	9.4	
Turnout		2,917		
Ind. Labour Party gain from Conservative		Swing		

=== St. James' ===
St. James'
Party	Candidate	Votes	%	±%
Liberal	H. J. Goldschmidt*	uncontested		
Liberal hold		Swing		

=== St. John's ===
St. John's
Party	Candidate	Votes	%	±%
Conservative	H. Shuttleworth*	607	63.4	+18.6
Liberal	J. Barrett	350	36.6	−18.6
Majority		257	26.8	
Turnout		957		
Conservative hold		Swing		

=== St. Luke's ===
St. Luke's
Party	Candidate	Votes	%	±%
Liberal	C. O'Doherty*	uncontested		
Liberal hold		Swing		

=== St. Mark's ===
St. Mark's
Party	Candidate	Votes	%	±%
Conservative	W. H. Beastow	1,231	74.6	N/A
Ind. Labour Party	W. H. Griffiths	420	25.4	−16.1
Majority		811	49.2	
Turnout		1,651		
Conservative gain from Liberal		Swing		

=== St. Michael's ===
St. Michael's
Party	Candidate	Votes	%	±%
Liberal	D. McCabe*	uncontested		
Liberal hold		Swing		

== Aldermanic elections ==
=== Aldermanic elections, 9 November 1898 ===
At the meeting of the council on 9 November 1898, the terms of office of thirteen aldermen expired.

The following thirteen were elected as aldermen by the council on 9 November 1898 for a term of six years.

Party	Alderman	Ward	Term expires
Liberal	J. H. Crosfield*	Openshaw	1904
Liberal	Alfred Evans*		1904
Conservative	William Griffin*	Harpurhey	1904
Liberal	Sir John James Harwood*		1904
Liberal	Lloyd Higginbottom*	St. Mark's	1904
Liberal	James Hoy*		1904
Liberal	A. E. Lloyd*		1904
Conservative	H. H. Mainwaring*		1904
Liberal	John Milling*		1904
Liberal	John Foulkes Roberts*		1904
Liberal	James Rushworth*		1904
Liberal	Walton Smith*		1904
Conservative	James Tunstall*		1904

=== Aldermanic elections, 15 February 1899 ===
Caused by the death on 30 January 1899 of Alderman J. H. Crosfield (Liberal, elected as an alderman by the council on 10 November 1890).

In his place, Councillor Arthur Copeland (Conservative, St. Ann's, elected 19 July 1886) was elected as an alderman by the council on 15 February 1899.

Party	Alderman	Ward	Term expires
Conservative	Arthur Copeland	Openshaw	1904

Caused by the death on 2 February 1899 of Alderman A. E. Lloyd (Liberal, elected as an alderman by the council on 6 April 1892).

In his place, Councillor William Thomas Bax (Liberal, Medlock Street, elected 18 October 1887) was elected as an alderman by the council on 15 February 1899.

Party	Alderman	Ward	Term expires
Liberal	William Thomas Bax		1904

== By-elections between 1898 and 1899 ==
=== Ardwick, 2 February 1899 ===
Caused by the death of Councillor Stephen Chesters Thompson (Conservative, Ardwick, elected 16 March 1897; previously 1879-91, Alderman 1891-94) on 14 January 1899.

Ardwick
Party	Candidate	Votes	%	±%
Conservative	S. Chesters Thompson	uncontested		
Conservative hold		Swing		

=== St. Ann's, 20 February 1899 ===
Caused by the election as an alderman of Councillor Arthur Copeland (Conservative, St. Ann's, elected 19 July 1886) on 15 February 1899 following the death on 30 January 1899 of Alderman J. H. Crosfield (Liberal, elected as an alderman by the council on 10 November 1890).

St. Ann's
Party	Candidate	Votes	%	±%
Conservative	C. W. Botsford	uncontested		
Conservative hold		Swing		

=== Medlock Street, 27 February 1899 ===
Caused by the election as an alderman of Councillor William Thomas Bax (Liberal, Medlock Street, elected 18 October 1887) on 15 February 1899 following the death on 2 February 1899 of Alderman A. E. Lloyd (Liberal, elected as an alderman by the council on 6 April 1892).

Medlock Street
Party	Candidate	Votes	%	±%
Conservative	W. Kemp	1,510	56.8	N/A
Liberal	J. D. Pennington	1,148	43.2	N/A
Majority		362	13.6	N/A
Turnout		2,658		
Conservative gain from Liberal		Swing		
