= 1890 Manchester City Council election =

Local election in Manchester

- 1 November 1890

40 of 104 seats to Manchester City Council 53 seats needed for a majority
	First party	Second party	Third party
Party	Liberal	Conservative	Liberal Unionist
Last election	9 seats, 47.4%	9 seats, 48.6%	1 seats, 0.0%
Seats before	30	36	10
Seats won	23	16	1
Seats after	50	44	10
Seat change	▲15	▲6	Steady
Popular vote	24,123	21,825	0
Percentage	52.1%	47.1%	0.0%
Swing	▲4.7%	▼1.5%	Steady
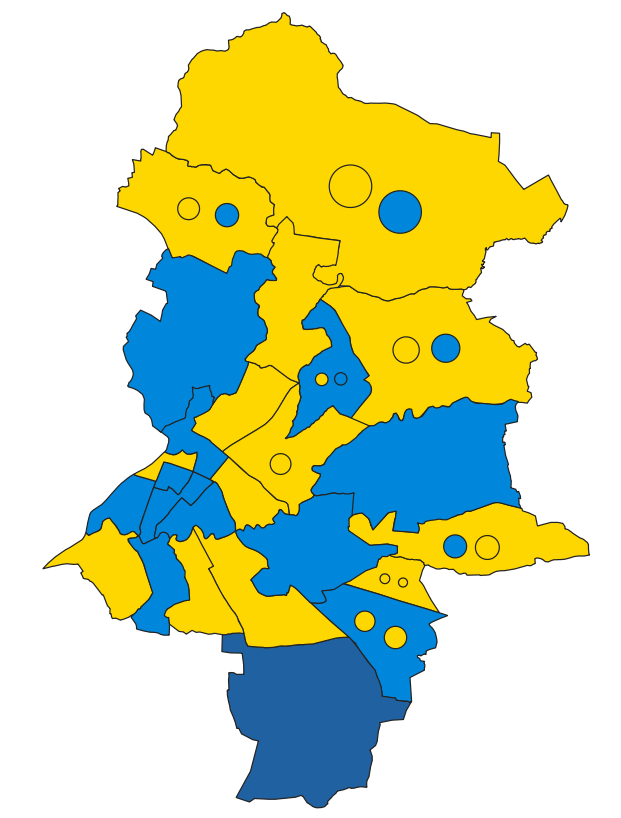
- Map of results of 1890 election
Leader of the Council before election
No overall control
Leader of the Council after election
No overall control

Elections to Manchester City Council were held on Saturday, 1 November 1890. One third of the councillors seats were up for election, with each successful candidate to serve a three-year term of office. Owing to the extension of the city's boundaries, seven new wards (Blackley and Moston, Crumpsall, Longsight, Miles Platting, Newton Heath, Openshaw, and St. Mark's) elected all of their councillors for the first time.

The council remained under no overall control.

== Election result ==
Party	Votes		Seats			Full Council	
Liberal Party	24,123 (52.1%)	▲4.7	23 (57.5%)	23 / 40	▲15	50 (48.1%)	50 / 104
Conservative Party	21,825 (47.1%)	▼1.5	16 (40.0%)	16 / 40	▲6	44 (42.3%)	44 / 104
Liberal Unionist	0 (0.0%)	Steady	1 (2.5%)	1 / 40	Steady	10 (9.6%)	10 / 104
Independent Liberal	366 (0.8%)	N/A	0 (0.0%)	0 / 40	N/A	0 (0.0%)	0 / 104

=== Full council ===
↓
50	10	44

=== Aldermen ===
↓
14	4	8

=== Councillors ===
↓
36	6	36

== Ward results ==
=== All Saints' ===
All Saints'
Party	Candidate	Votes	%	±%
Liberal	A. McDougall*	1,545	59.4	+18.6
Conservative	C. Law	1,054	40.6	−18.6
Majority		491	18.8	
Turnout		2,599		
Liberal hold		Swing		

=== Ardwick ===
Ardwick
Party	Candidate	Votes	%	±%
Conservative	E. Tatton*	uncontested		
Conservative hold		Swing		

=== Blackley and Moston ===
Blackley and Moston (3 vacancies)
Party	Candidate	Votes	%	±%
Liberal	G. T. Stanley	1,056	58.1	
Liberal	J. Ward	971	53.4	
Conservative	T. Briggs	934	51.4	
Liberal	C. Rowley	880	48.4	
Conservative	E. H. Jones	820	45.1	
Conservative	S. Mills	789	43.4	
Majority		54	3.0	
Turnout		1,817		
Liberal win (new seat)				
Liberal win (new seat)				
Conservative win (new seat)				

=== Bradford ===
Bradford
Party	Candidate	Votes	%	±%
Conservative	J. Tunstall*	uncontested		
Conservative hold		Swing		

=== Cheetham ===
Cheetham
Party	Candidate	Votes	%	±%
Conservative	H. Boddington*	uncontested		
Conservative hold		Swing		

=== Collegiate Church ===
Collegiate Church
Party	Candidate	Votes	%	±%
Conservative	W. Bagnall*	842	58.3	+0.9
Liberal	J. Harrop	602	41.7	−0.9
Majority		240	16.6	+1.8
Turnout		1,444		
Conservative hold		Swing		

=== Crumpsall ===
Crumpsall (3 vacancies)
Party	Candidate	Votes	%	±%
Liberal	W. Butterworth	uncontested		
Liberal	G. Rhodes	uncontested		
Conservative	E. Holt	uncontested		
Liberal win (new seat)				
Liberal win (new seat)				
Conservative win (new seat)				

=== Exchange ===
Exchange
Party	Candidate	Votes	%	±%
Liberal	S. B. Worthington*	uncontested		
Liberal hold		Swing		

=== Harpurhey ===
Harpurhey
Party	Candidate	Votes	%	±%
Liberal	W. Sherratt*	2,115	50.5	+12.5
Conservative	J. Faulkner	2,075	49.5	−12.5
Majority		40	1.0	
Turnout		4,190		
Liberal hold		Swing		

=== Longsight ===
Longsight (3 vacancies)
Party	Candidate	Votes	%	±%
Conservative	C. Jennison	1,014	60.2	
Liberal	G. H. Russell	974	57.8	
Liberal	T. Uttley	855	50.8	
Conservative	C. Kay	780	46.3	
Conservative	E. Dodd	731	43.4	
Liberal	E. N. Worthington	698	41.4	
Majority		75	4.5	
Turnout		1,684		
Conservative win (new seat)				
Liberal win (new seat)				
Liberal win (new seat)				

=== Medlock Street ===
Medlock Street
Party	Candidate	Votes	%	±%
Conservative	H. Cardwell*	uncontested		
Conservative hold		Swing		

=== Miles Platting ===
Miles Platting (3 vacancies)
Party	Candidate	Votes	%	±%
Conservative	H. Morgan	uncontested		
Liberal	J. Bowes	uncontested		
Conservative	H. Tetlow	uncontested		
Conservative win (new seat)				
Liberal win (new seat)				
Conservative win (new seat)				

=== New Cross ===
New Cross
Party	Candidate	Votes	%	±%
Liberal	H. Aldred*	uncontested		
Liberal	J. B. Fullerton*	uncontested		
Liberal hold		Swing		
Liberal hold		Swing		

=== Newton Heath ===
Newton Heath (3 vacancies)
Party	Candidate	Votes	%	±%
Liberal	G. Evans	1,167	54.3	
Liberal	W. Trevor	1,153	53.7	
Conservative	J. M. Elliott	1,124	52.3	
Liberal	R. Brown	1,063	49.5	
Conservative	J. Garlick	982	45.7	
Conservative	T. Milnes	956	44.5	
Majority		61	2.8	
Turnout		2,148		
Liberal win (new seat)				
Liberal win (new seat)				
Conservative win (new seat)				

=== Openshaw ===
Openshaw (3 vacancies)
Party	Candidate	Votes	%	±%
Liberal	S. J. Erwin	1,594	53.5	
Conservative	J. Battersby	1,557	52.2	
Liberal	J. H. Crosfield	1,512	50.7	
Conservative	J. Robinson	1,499	49.9	
Liberal	J. Brierley	1,401	47.0	
Conservative	W. Charlton	1,381	46.3	
Majority		13	0.8	
Turnout		2,981		
Liberal win (new seat)				
Conservative win (new seat)				
Liberal win (new seat)				

=== Oxford ===
Oxford
Party	Candidate	Votes	%	±%
Conservative	H. Simpson*	383	50.2	N/A
Liberal	J. H. Greenhow	380	49.8	N/A
Majority		3	0.4	N/A
Turnout		763		
Conservative hold		Swing		

=== Rusholme ===
Rusholme
Party	Candidate	Votes	%	±%
Liberal Unionist	W. T. Gunson*	uncontested		
Liberal Unionist hold		Swing		

=== St. Ann's ===
St. Ann's
Party	Candidate	Votes	%	±%
Conservative	A. G. Copeland*	uncontested		
Conservative hold		Swing		

=== St. Clement's ===
St. Clement's
Party	Candidate	Votes	%	±%
Liberal	T. C. Abbott	803	54.6	+9.7
Conservative	J. Brierley	668	45.4	−9.7
Majority		135	9.2	
Turnout		1,471		
Liberal gain from Conservative		Swing		

=== St. George's ===
St. George's
Party	Candidate	Votes	%	±%
Liberal	R. Gibson*	uncontested		
Liberal hold		Swing		

=== St. James' ===
St. James'
Party	Candidate	Votes	%	±%
Conservative	H. Samson*	uncontested		
Conservative hold		Swing		

=== St. John's ===
St. John's
Party	Candidate	Votes	%	±%
Conservative	J. H. Cuff*	590	57.6	N/A
Liberal	W. G. Sutherland	435	42.5	N/A
Majority		155	15.2	N/A
Turnout		1,025		
Conservative hold		Swing		

=== St. Luke's ===
St. Luke's
Party	Candidate	Votes	%	±%
Liberal	J. W. Southern*	uncontested		
Liberal hold		Swing		

=== St. Mark's ===
St. Mark's (3 vacancies)
Party	Candidate	Votes	%	±%
Liberal	L. Higginbottom	1,179	63.1	
Liberal	S. H. Brooks	1,016	54.4	
Liberal	W. H. Wainwright	935	50.0	
Conservative	E. J. Reynolds	922	49.3	
Conservative	J. Phythian	846	45.3	
Conservative	W. Macbeth	710	38.0	
Majority		13	0.7	
Turnout		1,869		
Liberal win (new seat)				
Liberal win (new seat)				
Liberal win (new seat)				

=== St. Michael's ===
St. Michael's
Party	Candidate	Votes	%	±%
Liberal	J. H. Wells	1,789	53.8	−4.5
Conservative	J. Lee	1,168	35.2	−6.5
Independent Liberal	W. Brown	366	11.0	N/A
Majority		621	18.6	+2.0
Turnout		3,323		
Liberal hold		Swing		

== Aldermanic elections ==
=== Aldermanic elections, 10 November 1890 ===
Caused by the creation of Blackley & Moston, Crumpsall, Longsight, Miles Platting, Newton Heath, Openshaw and St. Mark's wards on 1 November 1890, requiring the election of seven aldermen by the council.

The following seven were elected as aldermen by the council on 10 November 1890.

Party	Alderman	Ward	Term expires
Liberal	J. H. Crosfield	Openshaw	1892
Liberal	George Evans	Newton Heath	1892
Liberal	Lloyd Higginbottom	St. Mark's	1892
Conservative	John Fletcher Hill	Crumpsall	1895
Liberal	William Henry Holland	Miles Platting	1895
Liberal	Dr. George Hanna Russell	Longsight	1892
Liberal	G. T. Stanley	Blackley & Moston	1895

=== Aldermanic election, 9 March 1891 ===
Caused by the resignation on 4 March 1891 of Alderman William Tessimond Windsor (Conservative, elected as an alderman by the council on 1 August 1888).

In his place, Councillor Stephen Chesters Thompson (Conservative, Ardwick, elected 23 July 1879) was elected as an alderman by the council on 9 March 1891.

Party	Alderman	Ward	Term expires
Conservative	Stephen Chesters Thompson	St. George's	1895

=== Aldermanic election, 8 April 1891 ===
Caused by the death on 12 March 1891 of Alderman Thomas Schofield (Liberal Unionist, elected as an alderman by the council on 7 December 1882).

In his place, Councillor John Hinchliffe (Conservative, Ardwick, elected 1 November 1879) was elected as an alderman by the council on 8 April 1891.

Party	Alderman	Ward	Term expires
Conservative	John Hinchliffe		1892

=== Aldermanic election, 2 September 1891 ===
Caused by the death on 24 August 1891 of Alderman Joseph Lamb (Conservative, elected as an alderman by the council on 13 December 1865).

In his place, Councillor Bosdin Leech (Liberal, Oxford, elected 1 November 1880) was elected as an alderman by the council on 2 September 1891.

Party	Alderman	Ward	Term expires
Liberal	Bosdin Leech		1895

== By-elections between 1890 and 1891 ==
=== By-elections, 30 November 1890 ===
Five by-elections were held on 30 November 1890 to fill vacancies that were created by the appointment of aldermen on 10 November 1890.

==== Blackley and Moston ====
Caused by the election as an alderman of Councillor G. T. Stanley (Liberal, Blackley and Moston, elected 1 November 1890) on 10 November 1890, following the creation of Blackley & Moston ward on 1 November 1890, requiring the election of an alderman by the council.

Blackley and Moston
Party	Candidate	Votes	%	±%
Liberal	C. Rowley	890	50.1	−8.0
Conservative	E. H. Jones	887	49.9	−1.5
Majority		3	0.2	
Turnout		1,777		
Liberal hold		Swing		

==== Longsight ====
Caused by the election as an alderman of Councillor Dr. George Hanna Russell (Liberal, Longsight, elected 1 November 1890) on 10 November 1890, following the creation of Longsight ward on 1 November 1890, requiring the election of an alderman by the council.

Longsight
Party	Candidate	Votes	%	±%
Conservative	J. R. Wilson	807	51.5	−8.7
Liberal	J. Heys	759	48.5	−9.3
Majority		48	3.0	
Turnout		1,566		
Conservative gain from Liberal		Swing		

==== Newton Heath ====
Caused by the election as an alderman of Councillor George Evans (Liberal, Newton Heath, elected 1 November 1890) on 10 November 1890, following the creation of Newton Heath ward on 1 November 1890, requiring the election of an alderman by the council.

Newton Heath
Party	Candidate	Votes	%	±%
Conservative	W. T. Rothwell	1,239	56.1	+3.8
Liberal	R. Brown	969	43.9	−10.4
Majority		270	12.2	+9.4
Turnout		2,208		
Conservative gain from Liberal		Swing		

==== Openshaw ====
Caused by the election as an alderman of Councillor J. H. Crosfield (Liberal, Openshaw, elected 1 November 1890; previously 1884-87) on 10 November 1890, following the creation of Openshaw ward on 1 November 1890, requiring the election of an alderman by the council.

Openshaw
Party	Candidate	Votes	%	±%
Conservative	J. Robinson	1,605	53.8	+1.6
Liberal	J. Brierley	1,377	46.2	−7.3
Majority		228	7.6	
Turnout		2,982		
Conservative gain from Liberal		Swing		

==== St. Mark's ====
Caused by the election as an alderman of Councillor Lloyd Higginbottom (Liberal, St. Mark's, elected 1 November 1890) on 10 November 1890, following the creation of St. Mark's ward on 1 November 1890, requiring the election of an alderman by the council.

St. Mark's
Party	Candidate	Votes	%	±%
Conservative	E. J. Reynolds	942	50.6	+1.3
Liberal	O. Gwatkin	920	49.3	−13.7
Majority		22	1.2	
Turnout		1,862		
Conservative gain from Liberal		Swing		

=== St. Clement's, 12 February 1891 ===
Caused by the resignation of Councillor Nicolai Christian Schou (Conservative, St. Clement's, elected 1 November 1883) on 4 February 1891.

St. Clement's
Party	Candidate	Votes	%	±%
Liberal	G. D. Kelley	uncontested		
Liberal gain from Conservative		Swing		

=== Ardwick, 20 March 1891 ===
Caused by the election as an alderman of Councillor Stephen Chesters Thompson (Conservative, Ardwick, elected 23 July 1879) on 9 March 1891 following the resignation on 4 March 1891 of Alderman William Tessimond Windsor (Conservative, elected as an alderman by the council on 1 August 1888).

Ardwick
Party	Candidate	Votes	%	±%
Conservative	S. Chesters	2,058	58.8	N/A
Lib-Lab	M. Arrandale	1,442	41.2	N/A
Majority		616	17.6	N/A
Turnout		3,500		
Conservative hold		Swing		

=== St. John's, 6 April 1891 ===
Caused by the death of Councillor James Myerscough (Conservative, St. John's, elected 11 July 1889) on 25 March 1891.

St. John's
Party	Candidate	Votes	%	±%
Conservative	E. L. Kenworthy	uncontested		
Conservative hold		Swing		

=== Ardwick, 20 April 1891 ===
Caused by the election as an alderman of Councillor John Hinchliffe (Conservative, Ardwick, elected 1 November 1879) on 8 April 1891 following the death on 12 March 1891 of Alderman Thomas Schofield (Liberal Unionist, elected as an alderman by the council on 7 December 1882).

Ardwick
Party	Candidate	Votes	%	±%
Conservative	W. Fitzgerald	1,804	52.3	−6.5
Liberal	J. Shaw	1,644	47.7	+6.5
Majority		160	4.6	−13.0
Turnout		3,448		
Conservative hold		Swing		

=== St. George's, 29 May 1891 ===
Caused by the death of Councillor John Tatton (Liberal, St. George's, elected 1 November 1889) on 12 May 1891.

St. George's
Party	Candidate	Votes	%	±%
Liberal	R. Carhart	1,757	60.9	N/A
Conservative	W. Deakin	1,130	39.1	N/A
Majority		627	21.8	N/A
Turnout		2,887		
Liberal hold		Swing		

=== Openshaw, 6 August 1891 ===
Caused by the death of Councillor Samuel James Erwin (Liberal, Openshaw, elected 1 November 1890) on 16 July 1891.

Openshaw
Party	Candidate	Votes	%	±%
Liberal	J. Saxon	1,351	54.3	+8.1
Conservative	J. Pollitt	1,135	45.7	−8.1
Majority		216	8.6	
Turnout		2,486		
Liberal hold		Swing		

=== Oxford, 14 September 1891 ===
Caused by the election as an alderman of Councillor Bosdin Leech (Liberal, Oxford, elected 1 November 1880) on 2 September 1891 following the death on 24 August 1891 of Alderman Joseph Lamb (Conservative, elected as an alderman by the council on 13 December 1865).

Oxford
Party	Candidate	Votes	%	±%
Liberal	J. H. Greenhow	uncontested		
Liberal hold		Swing		

=== Ardwick, 22 September 1891 ===
Caused by the death of Councillor Stephen Chesters (Conservative, Ardwick, elected 20 March 1891) on 12 September 1891.

Ardwick
Party	Candidate	Votes	%	±%
Liberal Unionist	R. C. Smith	uncontested		
Liberal Unionist gain from Conservative		Swing		
