= 1893 Manchester City Council election =

Local election in Manchester

- 1 November 1893

26 of 104 seats to Manchester City Council 53 seats needed for a majority
	First party	Second party	Third party
Party	Conservative	Liberal	Liberal Unionist
Last election	10 seats, 32.9%	14 seats, 46.7%	1 seats, 0.0%
Seats before	47	48	9
Seats won	15	11	0
Seats after	48	48	8
Seat change	▲1	Steady	▼1
Popular vote	18,167	16,614	0
Percentage	43.7%	40.0%	0.0%
Swing	▲10.8%	▼6.7%	Steady
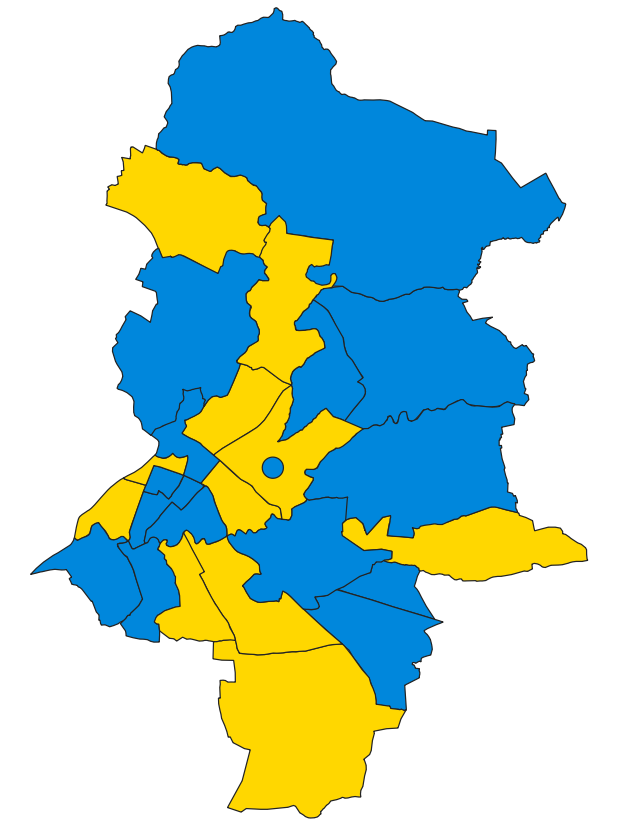
- Map of results of 1893 election
Leader of the Council before election
No overall control
Leader of the Council after election
No overall control

Elections to Manchester City Council were held on Wednesday, 1 November 1893. One third of the councillors seats were up for election, with each successful candidate to serve a three-year term of office. The council remained under no overall control.

== Election result ==
Party	Votes		Seats			Full Council	
Conservative Party	18,167 (43.7%)	▲10.8	15 (57.7%)	15 / 26	▲1	48 (46.2%)	48 / 104
Liberal Party	16,614 (40.0%)	▼6.7	11 (42.3%)	11 / 26	Steady	48 (46.2%)	48 / 104
Liberal Unionist	0 (0.0%)	Steady	0 (0.0%)	0 / 26	▼1	8 (7.7%)	8 / 104
Ind. Labour Party	6,573 (15.8%)	▲6.0	0 (0.0%)	0 / 26	Steady	0 (0.0%)	0 / 104
Independent	227 (0.5%)	▼4.0	0 (0.0%)	0 / 26	Steady	0 (0.0%)	0 / 104

=== Full council ===
↓
48	8	48

=== Aldermen ===
↓
14	4	8

=== Councillors ===
↓
34	4	40

== Ward results ==
=== All Saints' ===
All Saints'
Party	Candidate	Votes	%	±%
Liberal	A. McDougall*	uncontested		
Liberal hold		Swing		

=== Ardwick ===
Ardwick
Party	Candidate	Votes	%	±%
Conservative	W. Pollitt	2,083	55.1	N/A
Liberal	H. Matthews	1,697	44.9	N/A
Majority		386	10.2	N/A
Turnout		3,780		
Conservative hold		Swing		

=== Blackley and Moston ===
Blackley and Moston
Party	Candidate	Votes	%	±%
Conservative	S. Mills	930	50.3	N/A
Liberal	C. Rowley*	919	49.7	N/A
Majority		11	0.6	N/A
Turnout		1,849		
Conservative gain from Liberal		Swing		

=== Bradford ===
Bradford
Party	Candidate	Votes	%	±%
Conservative	J. Tunstall*	uncontested		
Conservative hold		Swing		

=== Cheetham ===
Cheetham
Party	Candidate	Votes	%	±%
Conservative	C. H. Braddon*	uncontested		
Conservative hold		Swing		

=== Collegiate Church ===
Collegiate Church
Party	Candidate	Votes	%	±%
Conservative	W. Bagnall*	uncontested		
Conservative hold		Swing		

=== Crumpsall ===
Crumpsall
Party	Candidate	Votes	%	±%
Liberal	W. Butterworth*	620	62.9	+22.1
Conservative	W. F. Dearden	366	37.1	−22.1
Majority		254	25.8	
Turnout		986		
Liberal hold		Swing		

=== Exchange ===
Exchange
Party	Candidate	Votes	%	±%
Liberal	S. B. Worthington*	367	61.8	+5.3
Independent	F. Moss	227	38.2	−5.3
Majority		140	23.6	+10.6
Turnout		594		
Liberal hold		Swing		

=== Harpurhey ===
Harpurhey
Party	Candidate	Votes	%	±%
Liberal	W. Sherratt*	1,941	42.6	N/A
Conservative	G. W. Chadwick	1,935	42.5	−19.6
Ind. Labour Party	F. Connor	676	14.9	−20.0
Majority		6	0.1	
Turnout		4,552		
Liberal hold		Swing		

=== Longsight ===
Longsight
Party	Candidate	Votes	%	±%
Conservative	C. Jennison*	uncontested		
Conservative hold		Swing		

=== Medlock Street ===
Medlock Street
Party	Candidate	Votes	%	±%
Conservative	H. Cardwell*	1,679	60.8	−10.0
Ind. Labour Party	J. Lee	1,081	39.2	N/A
Majority		598	21.6	−20.0
Turnout		2,760		
Conservative hold		Swing		

=== Miles Platting ===
Miles Platting
Party	Candidate	Votes	%	±%
Conservative	H. Morgan*	1,126	57.7	N/A
Ind. Labour Party	J. Billam	826	42.3	N/A
Majority		300	15.4	N/A
Turnout		1,952		
Conservative hold		Swing		

=== New Cross ===
New Cross
Party	Candidate	Votes	%	±%
Liberal	H. Aldred*	1,930	39.1	−27.5
Conservative	W. Holland	1,916	38.8	N/A
Liberal	J. B. Fullerton*	1,784	36.1	−30.5
Conservative	T. Hobson	1,541	31.2	N/A
Ind. Labour Party	J. Ritson	1,356	27.4	−8.3
Majority		132	2.7	
Turnout		4,941		
Liberal hold		Swing		
Conservative gain from Liberal		Swing		

=== Newton Heath ===
Newton Heath
Party	Candidate	Votes	%	±%
Conservative	W. T. Rothwell*	1,196	73.6	N/A
Ind. Labour Party	G. G. Beresford	428	26.4	N/A
Majority		768	47.2	N/A
Turnout		1,624		
Conservative hold		Swing		

=== Openshaw ===
Openshaw
Party	Candidate	Votes	%	±%
Liberal	J. Saxon*	1,815	62.4	N/A
Conservative	A. Stansfield	1,093	37.6	N/A
Majority		722	24.8	N/A
Turnout		2,908		
Liberal hold		Swing		

=== Oxford ===
Oxford
Party	Candidate	Votes	%	±%
Conservative	H. Simpson*	uncontested		
Conservative hold		Swing		

=== Rusholme ===
Rusholme
Party	Candidate	Votes	%	±%
Liberal	E. Holt	938	65.7	N/A
Conservative	F. Wallis	489	34.3	−6.0
Majority		447	31.4	
Turnout		1,427		
Liberal gain from Liberal Unionist		Swing		

=== St. Ann's ===
St. Ann's
Party	Candidate	Votes	%	±%
Conservative	A. G. Copeland*	uncontested		
Conservative hold		Swing		

=== St. Clement's ===
St. Clement's
Party	Candidate	Votes	%	±%
Liberal	T. C. Abbott*	740	53.4	−0.3
Conservative	G. H. Broadbent	645	46.6	+0.3
Majority		95	6.8	−0.6
Turnout		1,385		
Liberal hold		Swing		

=== St. George's ===
St. George's
Party	Candidate	Votes	%	±%
Conservative	R. A. S. Daly*	1,775	62.5	N/A
Ind. Labour Party	R. Anderson	1,066	37.5	N/A
Majority		709	25.0	
Turnout		2,841		
Conservative hold		Swing		

=== St. James' ===
St. James'
Party	Candidate	Votes	%	±%
Conservative	H. Samson*	uncontested		
Conservative hold		Swing		

=== St. John's ===
St. John's
Party	Candidate	Votes	%	±%
Liberal	M. W. Southern	529	54.8	+13.6
Conservative	J. H. Cuff*	437	45.2	−13.6
Majority		92	9.6	
Turnout		966		
Liberal gain from Conservative		Swing		

=== St. Luke's ===
St. Luke's
Party	Candidate	Votes	%	±%
Liberal	J. W. Southern*	1,835	84.1	N/A
Ind. Labour Party	S. McGregor	348	15.9	N/A
Majority		1,487	68.2	N/A
Turnout		2,183		
Liberal hold		Swing		

=== St. Mark's ===
St. Mark's
Party	Candidate	Votes	%	±%
Conservative	J. Phythian	956	54.7	+16.3
Ind. Labour Party	F. Lawler	792	45.3	N/A
Majority		164	9.4	
Turnout		1,748		
Conservative hold		Swing		

=== St. Michael's ===
St. Michael's
Party	Candidate	Votes	%	±%
Liberal	J. H. Wells*	1,372	91.5	+1.3
Liberal	H. Lightholder	127	8.5	−1.3
Majority		1,245	83.0	+2.6
Turnout		1,499		
Liberal hold		Swing		

== Aldermanic elections ==
=== Aldermanic election, 6 June 1894 ===
Caused by the disqualification on 3 May 1894 of Alderman Stephen Chesters Thompson (Conservative, elected as an alderman by the council on 9 March 1891).

In his place, Councillor John Grantham (Conservative, New Cross, elected 22 February 1883) was elected as an alderman by the council on 6 June 1894.

Party	Alderman	Ward	Term expires
Conservative	John Grantham		1895

=== Aldermanic election, 1 August 1894 ===
Caused by the death on 18 July 1894 of Alderman William Robinson (Conservative, elected as an alderman by the council on 9 November 1889).

In his place, Councillor Harry Rawson (Liberal Unionist, Exchange, elected 18 February 1884; previously 1856-61 and 1862-65) was elected as an alderman by the council on 1 August 1894.

Party	Alderman	Ward	Term expires
Liberal Unionist	Harry Rawson		1895

== By-elections between 1893 and 1894 ==
=== New Cross, 21 June 1894 ===
Caused by the election as an alderman of Councillor John Grantham (Conservative, New Cross, elected 22 February 1883) on 6 June 1894 following the disqualification on 3 May 1894 of Alderman Stephen Chesters Thompson (Conservative, elected as an alderman by the council on 9 March 1891).

New Cross
Party	Candidate	Votes	%	±%
Conservative	J. N. Ogden	1,690	42.7	+3.9
Liberal	F. Toomey	1,497	37.8	−1.3
Ind. Labour Party	J. Ritson	769	19.5	−7.9
Majority		193	4.9	+2.2
Turnout		3,956		
Conservative hold		Swing		

=== Exchange, 14 August 1894 ===
Caused by the election as an alderman of Councillor Harry Rawson (Liberal Unionist, Exchange, elected 18 February 1884; previously 1856-61 and 1862-65) on 1 August 1894 following the death on 18 July 1894 of Alderman William Robinson (Conservative, elected as an alderman by the council on 9 November 1889).

Exchange
Party	Candidate	Votes	%	±%
Liberal	F. Smallman	248	54.1	−7.7
Independent	F. Moss	210	45.9	+7.7
Majority		38	8.2	−15.4
Turnout		458		
Liberal gain from Liberal Unionist		Swing		

=== St. George's, 21 September 1894 ===
Caused by the resignation of Councillor Richard Carhart (Liberal, St. George's, elected 29 May 1891) on 10 September 1894.

St. George's
Party	Candidate	Votes	%	±%
Conservative	J. C. Nichol	1,546	56.2	−6.3
Ind. Labour Party	R. Anderson	1,206	43.8	+6.3
Majority		340	12.4	−12.6
Turnout		2,752		
Conservative gain from Liberal		Swing		
