= Blackley and Moston (ward) =

- Ward
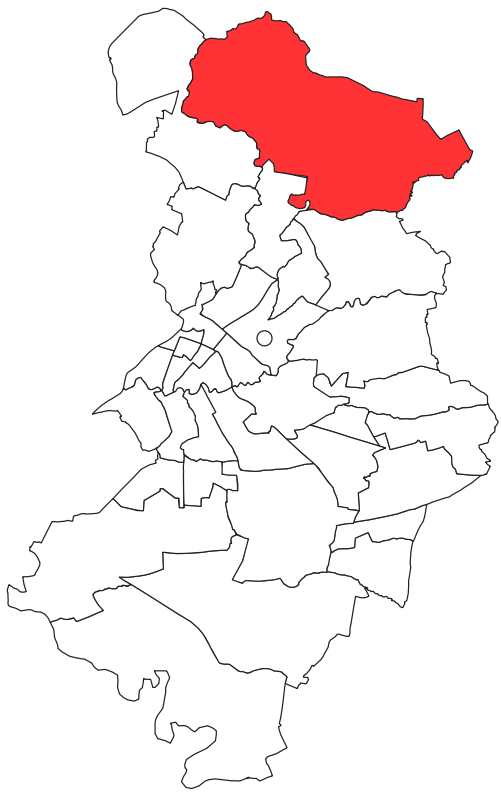
- Blackley and Moston ward (1909) within Manchester

- Coat of arms
- Country: United Kingdom
- Constituent country: England
- Region: North West England
- County borough: Manchester
- Created: November 1890
- Named for: Blackley, Moston

Government
  - Type: Unicameral
  - Body: Manchester City Council
- UK Parliamentary Constituency: Prestwich

Blackley and Moston was an electoral division of Manchester City Council which was represented from 1890 until 1919. It covered the townships of Blackley and Moston.

== Overview ==
Blackley and Moston ward was created in 1890, as a result of the Manchester Extension Scheme 1890, which transferred the townships of Blackley, Crumpsall, Moston, Newton, Openshaw, and parts of Gorton to the Manchester corporation. It covered the whole of the former Blackley and Moston townships. The ward was abolished 1919, and its area was divided between the new Blackley and Moston wards.

For the entirety of its existence, the ward formed part of the Prestwich Parliamentary constituency.

== Councillors ==
Election	Councillor	Councillor	Councillor
1890	G. T. Stanley (Lib)	J. Ward (Lib)	T. Briggs (Con)
November 1890	C. Rowley (Lib)	J. Ward (Lib)	T. Briggs (Con)
1891	C. Rowley (Lib)	J. Ward (Lib)	T. Briggs (Con)
1892	C. Rowley (Lib)	J. Ward (Lib)	T. Briggs (Con)
1893	S. Mills (Con)	J. Ward (Lib)	T. Briggs (Con)
1894	S. Mills (Con)	J. Ward (Lib)	T. Briggs (Con)
1895	S. Mills (Con)	J. Ward (Lib)	T. Briggs (Con)
1896	S. Mills (Con)	J. Ward (Lib)	T. Briggs (Con)
1897	S. Mills (Con)	J. Ward (Lib)	T. Briggs (Con)
1898	S. Mills (Con)	J. Ward (Lib)	T. Briggs (Con)
1899	J. E. Ogden (Con)	J. Ward (Lib)	T. Briggs (Con)
1900	J. E. Ogden (Con)	J. Ward (Lib)	T. Briggs (Con)
1901	J. E. Ogden (Con)	J. Ward (Lib)	T. Briggs (Con)
November 1901	J. E. Ogden (Con)	J. Ward (Lib)	T. Wilson (Con)
July 1902	J. E. Ogden (Con)	J. Ward (Lib)	J. Johnston (Lab)
1902	G. Bennett (Lib)	J. Ward (Lib)	J. Johnston (Lab)
1903	G. Bennett (Lib)	J. Ward (Lib)	J. Johnston (Lab)
April 1904	G. Bennett (Lib)	C. G. L. Skinner (Con)	J. Johnston (Lab)
1904	G. Bennett (Lib)	C. G. L. Skinner (Con)	J. Johnston (Lab)
1905	G. Bennett (Lib)	C. G. L. Skinner (Con)	J. Johnston (Lab)
1906	G. Bennett (Lib)	C. G. L. Skinner (Con)	J. Johnston (Lab)
1907	G. Bennett (Lib)	C. G. L. Skinner (Con)	J. Johnston (Lab)
1908	G. Bennett (Lib)	C. G. L. Skinner (Con)	J. Johnston (Lab)
1909	G. Bennett (Lib)	C. G. L. Skinner (Con)	J. Johnston (Lab)
1910	G. Bennett (Lib)	W. Phillips (Lab)	J. Johnston (Lab)
1911	G. Bennett (Lib)	W. Phillips (Lab)	J. Johnston (Lab)
1912	G. Bennett (Lib)	W. Phillips (Lab)	J. Johnston (Lab)
1913	G. Bennett (Lib)	A. Taylor (Lib)	J. Johnston (Lab)
May 1914	T. S. Williams (Lib)	A. Taylor (Lib)	J. Johnston (Lab)
1914	T. S. Williams (Lib)	A. Taylor (Lib)	J. Johnston (Lab)

== Elections ==
=== Elections in 1890s ===
==== November 1890 ====
1890 (3 vacancies)
Party	Candidate	Votes	%	±%
Liberal	G. T. Stanley	1,056	58.1	
Liberal	J. Ward	971	53.4	
Conservative	T. Briggs	934	51.4	
Liberal	C. Rowley	880	48.4	
Conservative	E. H. Jones	820	45.1	
Conservative	S. Mills	789	43.4	
Majority		54	3.0	
Turnout		1,817		
Liberal win (new seat)				
Liberal win (new seat)				
Conservative win (new seat)				

==== November 1890 (by-election) ====
By-election: 30 November 1890
Party	Candidate	Votes	%	±%
Liberal	C. Rowley	890	50.1	−8.0
Conservative	E. H. Jones	887	49.9	−1.5
Majority		3	0.2	
Turnout		1,777		
Liberal hold		Swing		

==== November 1891 ====
1891
Party	Candidate	Votes	%	±%
Conservative	T. Briggs*	uncontested		
Conservative hold		Swing		

==== November 1892 ====
1892
Party	Candidate	Votes	%	±%
Liberal	J. Ward*	uncontested		
Liberal hold		Swing		

==== November 1893 ====
1893
Party	Candidate	Votes	%	±%
Conservative	S. Mills	930	50.3	N/A
Liberal	C. Rowley*	919	49.7	N/A
Majority		11	0.6	N/A
Turnout		1,849		
Conservative gain from Liberal		Swing		

==== November 1894 ====
1894
Party	Candidate	Votes	%	±%
Conservative	T. Briggs*	uncontested		
Conservative hold		Swing		

==== November 1895 ====
1895
Party	Candidate	Votes	%	±%
Liberal	J. Ward*	1,022	56.6	N/A
Conservative	T. Nesbitt	784	43.4	N/A
Majority		238	13.2	N/A
Turnout		1,806		
Liberal hold		Swing		

==== November 1896 ====
1896
Party	Candidate	Votes	%	±%
Conservative	S. Mills*	1,110	52.9	+9.5
Liberal	G. Bennett	990	47.1	−9.5
Majority		120	5.8	
Turnout		2,100		
Conservative hold		Swing		

==== November 1897 ====
1897
Party	Candidate	Votes	%	±%
Conservative	T. Briggs*	1,151	76.0	+23.1
Ind. Labour Party	W. Tweedale	363	24.0	N/A
Majority		788	52.0	+46.2
Turnout		1,514		
Conservative hold		Swing		

==== November 1898 ====
1898
Party	Candidate	Votes	%	±%
Liberal	J. Ward*	uncontested		
Liberal hold		Swing		

==== November 1899 ====
1899
Party	Candidate	Votes	%	±%
Conservative	J. E. Ogden*	uncontested		
Conservative hold		Swing		

=== Elections in 1900s ===
==== November 1900 ====
1900
Party	Candidate	Votes	%	±%
Conservative	T. Briggs*	uncontested		
Conservative hold		Swing		

==== November 1901 ====
1901
Party	Candidate	Votes	%	±%
Liberal	J. Ward*	uncontested		
Liberal hold		Swing		

==== November 1901 (by-election) ====
By-election: 25 November 1901
Party	Candidate	Votes	%	±%
Conservative	T. Wilson	1,004	40.5	N/A
Labour	J. Johnston	741	29.9	N/A
Liberal	J. Singleton	735	29.6	N/A
Majority		263	10.6	N/A
Turnout		2,480		
Conservative hold		Swing		

==== July 1902 (by-election) ====
By-election: 28 July 1902
Party	Candidate	Votes	%	±%
Labour	J. Johnston	1,088	52.9	+23.0
Conservative	B. A. Redfern	967	47.1	+6.6
Majority		121	5.8	
Turnout		2,055		
Labour gain from Conservative		Swing		

==== November 1902 ====
1902
Party	Candidate	Votes	%	±%
Liberal	G. Bennett	1,426	53.6	N/A
Conservative	W. Prescott	1,233	46.4	N/A
Majority		193	7.2	N/A
Turnout		2,659		
Liberal gain from Conservative		Swing		

==== November 1903 ====
1903
Party	Candidate	Votes	%	±%
Labour	J. Johnston*	1,402	52.9	N/A
Conservative	G. H. Radcliffe	1,250	47.1	+0.7
Majority		152	5.8	
Turnout		2,652		
Labour hold		Swing		

==== April 1904 (by-election) ====
By-elections: 29 April 1904
Party	Candidate	Votes	%	±%
Conservative	C. G. L. Skinner	1,079	51.6	+4.5
Liberal	H. Rothwell	1,013	48.4	N/A
Majority		66	3.2	
Turnout		2,092		
Conservative gain from Liberal		Swing		

==== November 1904 ====
1904
Party	Candidate	Votes	%	±%
Conservative	C. G. L. Skinner*	uncontested		
Conservative hold		Swing		

==== November 1905 ====
1905
Party	Candidate	Votes	%	±%
Liberal	G. Bennett*	1,873	58.5	N/A
Conservative	J. R. Coutts	1,331	41.5	N/A
Majority		542	17.0	N/A
Turnout		3,204		
Liberal hold		Swing		

==== November 1906 ====
1906
Party	Candidate	Votes	%	±%
Labour	J. Johnston*	uncontested		
Labour hold		Swing		

==== November 1907 ====
1907
Party	Candidate	Votes	%	±%
Conservative	C. G. L. Skinner*	uncontested		
Conservative hold		Swing		

==== November 1908 ====
1908
Party	Candidate	Votes	%	±%
Liberal	G. Bennett*	1,686	38.0	N/A
Conservative	J. R. Coutts	1,406	31.6	N/A
Labour	W. Phillips	1,353	30.4	N/A
Majority		280	6.4	N/A
Turnout		4,445		
Liberal hold		Swing		

==== November 1909 ====
1909
Party	Candidate	Votes	%	±%
Labour	J. Johnston*	2,083	52.4	+22.0
Conservative	J. W. J. Cremlyn	1,895	47.6	+16.0
Majority		188	4.8	
Turnout		3,978		
Labour hold		Swing		

=== Elections in 1910s ===
==== November 1910 ====
1910
Party	Candidate	Votes	%	±%
Labour	W. Phillips	1,775	52.0	−0.4
Conservative	C. G. L. Skinner*	1,636	48.0	+0.4
Majority		139	4.0	−0.8
Turnout		3,411		
Labour gain from Conservative		Swing		

==== November 1911 ====
1911
Party	Candidate	Votes	%	±%
Liberal	G. Bennett*	2,324	67.4	N/A
Labour	F. Eccles	1,126	32.6	−19.4
Majority		1,198	34.8	
Turnout		3,450		
Liberal hold		Swing		

==== November 1912 ====
1912
Party	Candidate	Votes	%	±%
Labour	J. Johnston*	1,786	50.4	+17.8
Liberal	A. Taylor	1,755	49.6	−17.8
Majority		31	0.8	
Turnout		3,541		
Labour hold		Swing		

==== November 1913 ====
1913
Party	Candidate	Votes	%	±%
Liberal	A. Taylor	1,537	38.8	−10.8
Conservative	T. McRoy	1,320	33.3	N/A
Labour	C. H. Brierley	1,103	27.9	−22.5
Majority		217	5.5	
Turnout		3,960		
Liberal gain from Labour		Swing		

==== May 1914 (by-election) ====
By-election: 30 May 1914
Party	Candidate	Votes	%	±%
Liberal	T. S. Williams	uncontested		
Liberal hold		Swing		

==== November 1914 ====
1914
Party	Candidate	Votes	%	±%
Liberal	T. S. Williams*	uncontested		
Liberal hold		Swing		

== See also ==
- Manchester City Council
- Manchester City Council elections
