= Isaac Brassington =

British trade unionist and political activist

Isaac Brassington (1870 – 13 December 1932) was a British trade unionist and political activist.

Born in Sutton on the Hill in Derbyshire, Brassington began working on the railways, and joined the General Railway Workers' Union (GRWU). By 1906, he was based in Leeds and active in the Independent Labour Party (ILP). He was elected to Leeds City Council in 1907, representing East Hunslet. In 1908, he became editor of the GRWU's journal, Railway Worker, then in 1911 he became an organiser for the GRWU. The union became part of the National Union of Railwaymen, and Brassington became its organiser for the Lancashire area, moving to Manchester.

In Manchester, Brassington became associated with the left wing of the ILP, and was on the Hands Off Russia committee. He stood in Warrington at the 1918 United Kingdom general election, taking third place with 22.6% of the vote. After the election, he argued that the ILP should affiliate to the Third International. Although this position was defeated, Brassington remained active in the ILP and was elected to Manchester City Council in 1921, representing the Labour Party in St Mark's. By the 1930s, he was the chair of the council's transport committee, but he resigned from the ILP after voting to cut wages for car workers, in contravention of party policy. He retired from union duties in 1930, and stood down from the council in 1932.

Brassington spent his final months in Mickleover in Derbyshire, and died at the end of 1932.
