= James Johnston (socialist politician) =

British politician and activist (1846–1928)

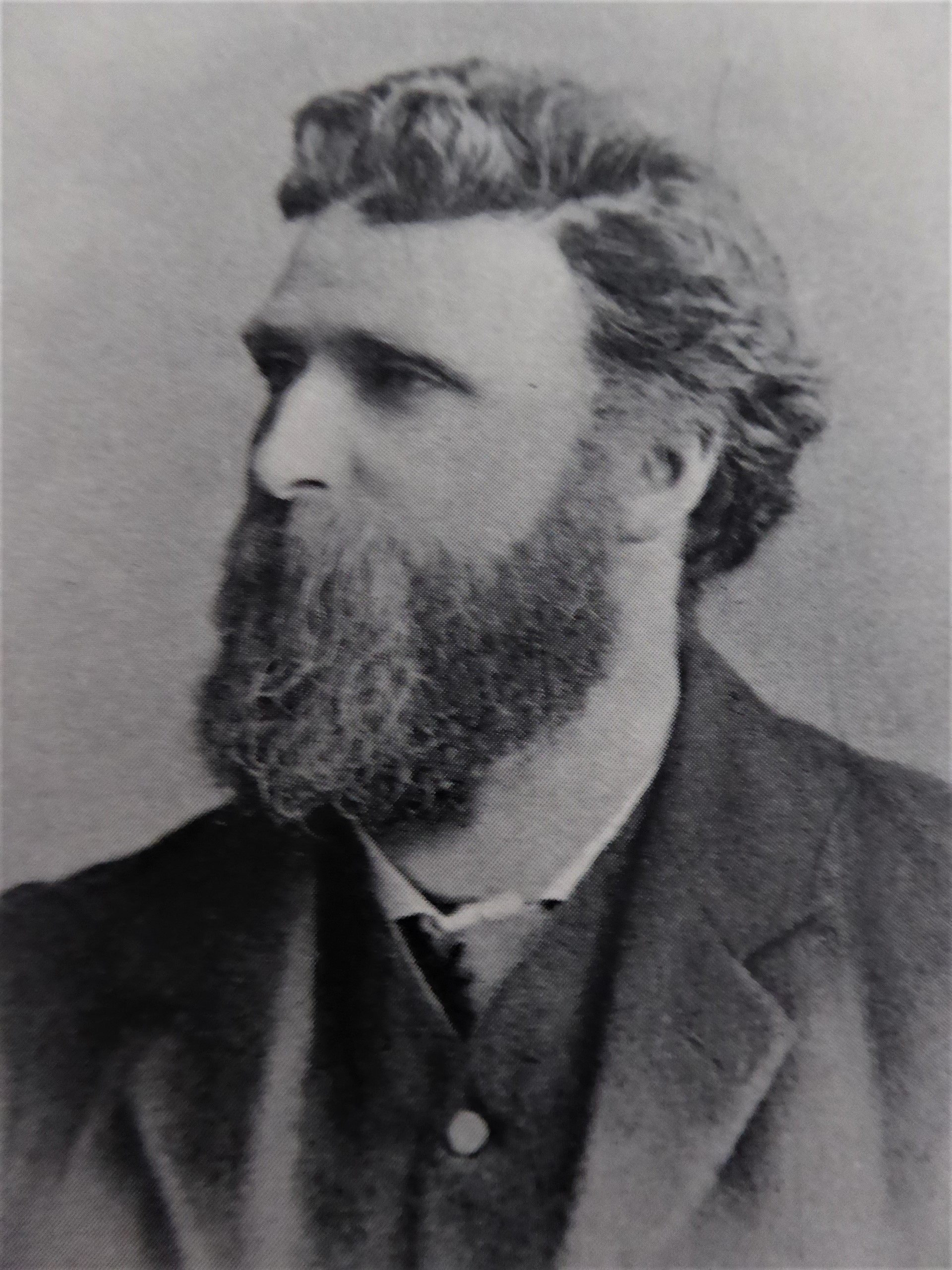
James Johnston, c.1899

James Johnston (1846 – 27 April 1928) was a British co-operative and socialist activist.

Born in Jarrow, Johnston left school at the age of eleven to work in the office of Palmers Shipbuilding and Iron Company. He studied at evening school and undertook an apprenticeship to become an engineer, then worked as a draughtsman.

Always interested in political and ethical matters, Johnston was a vegetarian and teetotaller from an early age. He was involved in Jarrow Literary and Debating Society and was honorary secretary for many years. In 1866, he was active in the campaign for Jarrow to receive a town charter. In 1868, he moved to Sunderland for work, then later relocated to Glasgow, where he studied engineering in the evenings at Anderson's College and then the University of Glasgow. He moved on again to London and then Rotherham before settling in Manchester in 1880, where he was a prominent advocate of the Manchester Ship Canal, working for the Parliamentary Committee which drew up the bill authorising its construction.

At the 1885 general election, Johnston stood unsuccessfully as an Independent Liberal-Labour candidate in Jarrow, taking 1,731 votes and second place. He was a founder member of the Independent Labour Party (ILP), setting up its Macclesfield branch in 1894. At the 1895 general election, the ILP's Prospective Parliamentary Candidate for Manchester North East, Leonard Hall, withdrew at short notice due to a lack of campaign funds, and Johnston stepped in, although he took only 546 votes. At the 1900 general election, he stood in Ashton-under-Lyne, again at short notice, on this occasion for the Labour Representation Committee, but with the support of the ILP. He took 737 votes and was again unsuccessful. However, he was elected to Manchester City Council in 1898, representing St. George's ward, serving three years, and again from 1902 to 1916, representing Blackley and Moston ward, and as an alderman from 1916.

In his spare time, Johnston founded a boys' activity club, then ran seaside camps for young girls, to enable them to go on holiday. He was president of the Smoke Abatement League from 1884 until 1890, the Manchester and Salford Equitable Co-operative Society from 1886 to 1889, and chaired the Manchester Working Men's Association during the 1890s. He also twice travelled around the world, and enjoyed rock climbing in Britain and Switzerland.
