= 1984 Manchester City Council election =

1984 UK local government election

- 3 May 1984

35 of 99 seats to Manchester City Council 50 seats needed for a majority
	First party	Second party	Third party
Leader	Bill Egerton	Harold Tucker	David Sandiford
Party	Labour	Conservative	Alliance
Leader's seat	Beswick and Clayton	Barlow Moor	Withington
Last election	27 seats, 51.6%	4 seats, 31.1%	2 seats, 17.1%
Seats before	72	22	5
Seats won	29	4	2
Seats after	79	14	6
Seat change	▲7	▼8	▲1
Popular vote	75,337	36,027	20,443
Percentage	57.0%	27.2%	15.4%
Swing	▲5.4%	▼3.9%	▼1.7%
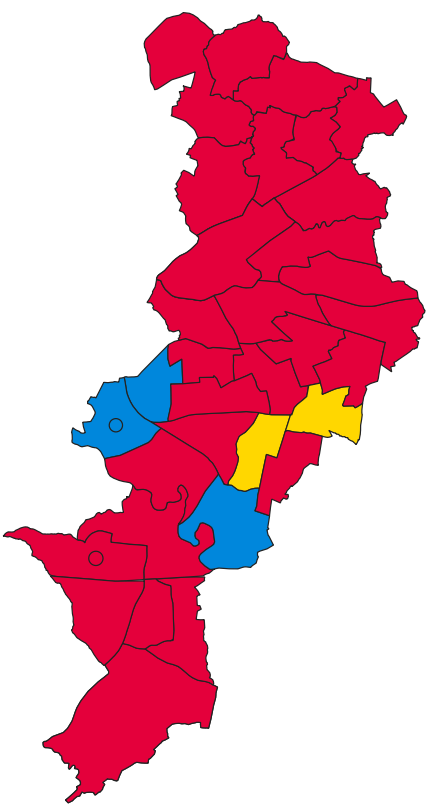
- Map of results of 1984 election
Leader of the Council before election
Bill Egerton
Labour
Leader of the Council after election
Bill Egerton
Labour

Elections to Manchester City Council were held on Thursday, 3 May 1984. One third of the council was up for election, with each successful candidate to serve a four-year term of office, expiring in 1988. The Labour Party retained overall control of the council.

== Election result ==
Party	Votes		Seats			Full Council	
Labour Party	75,337 (57.0%)	▲5.4	29 (82.9%)	29 / 35	▲7	79 (79.8%)	79 / 99
Conservative Party	36,027 (27.2%)	▼3.9	4 (11.4%)	4 / 35	▼8	14 (14.1%)	14 / 99
Alliance	20,443 (15.4%)	▼1.7	2 (5.7%)	2 / 35	▲1	6 (6.1%)	6 / 99
National Front	163 (0.1%)	Steady	0 (0.0%)	0 / 35	Steady	0 (0.0%)	0 / 99
Independent	156 (0.1%)	▲0.1	0 (0.0%)	0 / 35	Steady	0 (0.0%)	0 / 99
Communist	93 (0.1%)	Steady	0 (0.0%)	0 / 35	Steady	0 (0.0%)	0 / 99

↓
79	6	14

== Ward results ==
=== Ardwick ===
Ardwick
Party	Candidate	Votes	%	±%
Labour	Frank Dale*	1,956	76.5	+0.9
Conservative	Stephen Lundy	408	15.9	+0.4
Liberal	Norman Allen	194	7.6	−1.2
Majority		1,548	60.5	+0.4
Turnout		2,558		
Labour hold		Swing	+0.2	

=== Baguley ===
Baguley
Party	Candidate	Votes	%	±%
Labour	Anthony Burns*	2,631	66.6	+4.3
Conservative	Christopher Ennis	993	25.1	−3.3
Liberal	Georgina Hall	328	8.3	−0.9
Majority		1,638	41.4	+7.5
Turnout		3,952		
Labour hold		Swing	+3.8	

=== Barlow Moor ===
Barlow Moor
Party	Candidate	Votes	%	±%
Labour	H. Johnston	2,004	46.5	+0.9
Conservative	Henry Moore*	1,503	34.9	−3.3
SDP	Simon Gluck	799	18.6	+2.4
Majority		501	11.6	+4.1
Turnout		4,306		
Labour gain from Conservative		Swing	+2.1	

=== Benchill ===
Benchill
Party	Candidate	Votes	%	±%
Labour	Veronica Myers*	2,147	75.7	+3.6
Conservative	Gladys Parry	425	15.0	−0.5
Liberal	Gilbert Stacey	264	9.3	−3.1
Majority		1,722	60.7	+4.1
Turnout		2,836		
Labour hold		Swing	+2.0	

=== Beswick and Clayton ===
Beswick and Clayton
Party	Candidate	Votes	%	±%
Labour	Jack Flanagan*	2,432	76.2	+7.3
Conservative	David Eager	543	17.0	−5.0
SDP	Angus Bateman	148	4.6	−2.1
National Front	Alfred Coles	68	2.1	−0.2
Majority		1,889	59.2	+12.2
Turnout		3,191		
Labour hold		Swing	+6.1	

=== Blackley ===
Blackley
Party	Candidate	Votes	%	±%
Labour	Eddie Newman*	2,522	66.2	+4.2
Conservative	Y. Whitehurst	904	23.7	−4.9
Liberal	L. Gordon	386	10.1	+0.7
Majority		1,618	42.4	+9.0
Turnout		3,812		
Labour hold		Swing	+4.5	

=== Bradford ===
Bradford
Party	Candidate	Votes	%	±%
Labour	C. Heald	2,455	79.3	+6.5
Conservative	M. Payne	402	13.0	−4.9
Liberal	S. Donnelly	237	7.7	−1.6
Majority		2,053	66.4	+11.6
Turnout		3,094		
Labour hold		Swing	+5.7	

=== Brooklands ===
Brooklands
Party	Candidate	Votes	%	±%
Labour	John Broderick	2,188	49.3	+6.9
Labour	Paul Clarke	2,119		
Conservative	J. Graham	1,741	39.2	−6.3
Conservative	Arthur O'Connor*	1,729		
SDP	Jeffrey Burton	508	11.4	−0.7
SDP	Peter Thompson	464		
Majority		378	10.1	+6.9
Turnout		8,749		
Labour gain from Conservative		Swing		
Labour gain from Conservative		Swing	+6.6	

=== Burnage ===
Burnage
Party	Candidate	Votes	%	±%
Labour	J. Clegg	2,418	48.9	+4.8
Conservative	Ronald Nicholson	1,847	37.4	−3.4
SDP	Kenneth McKeon	678	13.7	−1.4
Majority		571	11.6	+8.3
Turnout		4,943		
Labour gain from Conservative		Swing	+4.1	

=== Central ===
Central
Party	Candidate	Votes	%	±%
Labour	Gordon Conquest*	1,852	82.1	+5.4
Conservative	C. Lundy	297	13.2	+0.8
SDP	Muhammad Qureshi	106	4.7	−6.1
Majority		1,555	69.0	+4.7
Turnout		2,255		
Labour hold		Swing	+2.3	

=== Charlestown ===
Charlestown
Party	Candidate	Votes	%	±%
Labour	David Ford*	2,537	59.4	+6.9
Conservative	M. Jones	1,252	29.3	−2.0
SDP	Teresa Lyons	479	11.2	−5.0
Majority		1,285	30.1	+8.9
Turnout		4,268		
Labour hold		Swing	+4.4	

=== Cheetham ===
Cheetham
Party	Candidate	Votes	%	±%
Labour	J. McCardell	2,560	68.0	+1.3
SDP	K. Evans	863	22.9	+4.0
Conservative	P. Martyniuk	344	9.1	−5.3
Majority		1,697	45.0	−2.8
Turnout		3,767		
Labour hold		Swing	-1.3	

=== Chorlton ===
Chorlton
Party	Candidate	Votes	%	±%
Conservative	E. Walker	2,167	42.3	−4.5
Conservative	Margaret Davies	2,149		
Labour	W. Courtney	2,104	41.1	+4.6
Labour	Richard Reddington	1,906		
Liberal	John Commons	752	14.7	−1.4
Liberal	Margaret Boyle	708		
Communist	Michael Waterfield	93	1.8	+1.1
Majority		45	1.2	−9.8
Turnout		9,879		
Conservative hold		Swing		
Conservative hold		Swing	-4.5	

=== Crumpsall ===
Crumpsall
Party	Candidate	Votes	%	±%
Labour	Richard Leese	2,090	49.4	+5.1
Conservative	Frederick Lever*	1,640	38.8	−4.3
Liberal	H. Showman	501	11.8	−0.9
Majority		450	10.6	+9.4
Turnout		4,231		
Labour gain from Conservative		Swing	+4.7	

=== Didsbury ===
Didsbury
Party	Candidate	Votes	%	±%
Conservative	John Duke*	2,543	48.5	−3.8
Labour	R. Whyte	1,521	29.0	+8.0
SDP	John Whitman	1,181	22.5	−4.2
Majority		1,022	19.5	−6.2
Turnout		5,245		
Conservative hold		Swing	-5.9	

=== Fallowfield ===
Fallowfield
Party	Candidate	Votes	%	±%
Labour	Rhona Graham	2,122	54.0	+5.9
Conservative	George Taylor	1,368	34.8	−3.5
SDP	George Nevins	439	11.2	−2.3
Majority		754	19.2	+9.4
Turnout		3,929		
Labour hold		Swing	+4.7	

=== Gorton North ===
Gorton North
Party	Candidate	Votes	%	±%
Labour	Thomas Hamnett*	2,868	68.9	+14.3
Conservative	Christopher McGregor	957	23.0	−2.9
SDP	S. Muir	338	8.1	−11.4
Majority		1,911	45.9	+17.2
Turnout		4,163		
Labour hold		Swing	+8.6	

=== Gorton South ===
Gorton South
Party	Candidate	Votes	%	±%
Labour	N. Litherland	2,522	63.8	+11.5
Liberal	Dorothy Bell	825	20.9	−9.0
Conservative	N. Dentith	609	15.4	−2.4
Majority		1,697	42.9	+20.4
Turnout		3,956		
Labour hold		Swing	+10.2	

=== Harpurhey ===
Harpurhey
Party	Candidate	Votes	%	±%
Labour	Graham Stringer*	1,985	68.3	+9.8
Conservative	W. Smith	511	17.6	−7.2
SDP	Gerald Landsman	411	14.1	−2.6
Majority		1,474	50.7	+17.0
Turnout		2,907		
Labour hold		Swing	+8.5	

=== Hulme ===
Hulme
Party	Candidate	Votes	%	±%
Labour	Valerie Dunn*	2,243	80.6	+5.3
Conservative	R. Lamptey	337	12.1	−0.7
Liberal	Simon Lewis	202	7.3	−4.6
Majority		1,906	68.5	+6.1
Turnout		2,782		
Labour hold		Swing	+3.0	

=== Levenshulme ===
Levenshulme
Party	Candidate	Votes	%	±%
Liberal	Janet Blessing*	2,404	46.1	+8.3
Labour	John Rimington	1,897	36.3	+5.0
Conservative	Gerald Carey	918	17.6	−13.3
Majority		507	9.7	+3.2
Turnout		5,219		
Liberal hold		Swing	+1.6	

=== Lightbowne ===
Lightbowne
Party	Candidate	Votes	%	±%
Labour	Alison Kelly*	2,576	56.0	+2.7
Conservative	Gwendoline Hurley	1,556	33.8	−1.4
Liberal	John Cookson	471	10.2	−1.3
Majority		1,020	22.2	+4.1
Turnout		4,603		
Labour hold		Swing	+2.0	

=== Longsight ===
Longsight
Party	Candidate	Votes	%	±%
Labour	Kathleen Robinson*	2,622	64.2	+8.7
SDP	Altaf Ahmed	813	19.9	−4.3
Conservative	B. Carey	579	14.2	−4.6
Independent	M. Amin	69	1.7	+1.7
Majority		1,809	44.3	+13.0
Turnout		4,083		
Labour hold		Swing	+6.5	

=== Moss Side ===
Moss Side
Party	Candidate	Votes	%	±%
Labour	A. Spencer*	2,764	78.4	+6.1
Conservative	Grant Higginson	495	14.0	−4.2
Liberal	Delsya Redford	265	7.5	−2.0
Majority		2,269	64.4	+10.3
Turnout		3,524		
Labour hold		Swing	+5.1	

=== Moston ===
Moston
Party	Candidate	Votes	%	±%
Labour	Leonard Kelly	2,471	53.6	+4.0
Conservative	Kenneth Goulding*	1,661	36.0	−3.0
Liberal	Martin Gradwell	476	10.3	−1.0
Majority		810	17.6	+7.0
Turnout		4,608		
Labour gain from Conservative		Swing	+3.5	

=== Newton Heath ===
Newton Heath
Party	Candidate	Votes	%	±%
Labour	John Smith*	2,293	73.4	+6.2
Conservative	R. Driver	535	17.1	−6.7
Liberal	M. Clune	203	6.5	−1.3
National Front	Bryan Nylan	95	3.0	+1.8
Majority		1,758	56.2	+12.8
Turnout		3,126		
Labour hold		Swing	+6.4	

=== Northenden ===
Northenden
Party	Candidate	Votes	%	±%
Labour	Harold Brown*	2,529	54.6	+10.2
Conservative	George Leigh	1,662	35.9	−5.9
SDP	L. Shields	444	9.6	−4.2
Majority		867	18.7	+16.1
Turnout		4,635		
Labour hold		Swing	+8.0	

=== Old Moat ===
Old Moat
Party	Candidate	Votes	%	±%
Labour	B. Harrison	2,732	52.6	+4.3
Conservative	Gerard Fitzsimons*	1,797	34.6	−2.2
Liberal	Richard Clayton	664	12.8	−2.1
Majority		935	18.0	+6.4
Turnout		5,193		
Labour gain from Conservative		Swing	+3.2	

=== Rusholme ===
Rusholme
Party	Candidate	Votes	%	±%
Labour	John Nicholson*	2,125	48.1	+1.2
Liberal	Guy Goodman	1,525	34.5	+10.4
Conservative	S. Denney	685	15.5	−12.2
Independent	S. Shah	87	2.0	+2.0
Majority		600	13.6	−5.6
Turnout		4,422		
Labour hold		Swing	-4.6	

=== Sharston ===
Sharston
Party	Candidate	Votes	%	±%
Labour	Kevan Lim*	2,213	53.0	+6.6
Conservative	A. Kenyon	1,362	32.6	+1.4
Liberal	Herbert Griffiths	598	14.3	−7.6
Majority		851	20.4	+5.2
Turnout		4,173		
Labour hold		Swing	+2.6	

=== Whalley Range ===
Whalley Range
Party	Candidate	Votes	%	±%
Conservative	Catherine McQuade	1,870	42.4	−3.5
Labour	Roy Walters	1,840	41.8	+3.8
SDP	Muriel James	696	15.8	−0.3
Majority		30	0.7	−7.3
Turnout		4,406		
Conservative hold		Swing	-3.6	

=== Withington ===
Withington
Party	Candidate	Votes	%	±%
Liberal	A. Firth	1,940	36.3	−5.7
Labour	Graham Martin	1,845	34.5	+12.8
Conservative	Joan Jacobs*	1,566	29.3	−7.0
Majority		95	1.8	−3.9
Turnout		5,351		
Liberal gain from Conservative		Swing	-9.2	

=== Woodhouse Park ===
Woodhouse Park
Party	Candidate	Votes	%	±%
Labour	M. Ainsworth	2,273	72.7	+12.4
Conservative	P. Champion	550	17.6	−3.4
SDP	Eileen Wildman	305	9.8	−8.9
Majority		1,723	55.1	+15.7
Turnout		3,128		
Labour hold		Swing	+7.9	

== By-elections between 1984 and 1986 ==
=== Blackley, 2 May 1985 ===
Caused by the resignation of Councillor Eddy Newman M.E.P. (Labour, Blackley, elected 3 May 1979) on 21 March 1985.

Blackley
Party	Candidate	Votes	%	±%
Labour	K. Barnes	2,314	56.9	−9.3
Conservative	K. Potter	870	21.4	−2.3
Liberal	J. Cookson	801	19.7	+9.6
National Front	B. Nylan	79	1.9	N/A
Majority		1,444	35.5	−6.9
Turnout		4,064		
Labour hold		Swing		
