= 1962 Manchester City Council election =

UK local government election

- 10 May 1962

38 of 152 seats to Manchester City Council 77 seats needed for a majority
	First party	Second party	Third party
Party	Labour	Conservative	Liberal
Last election	22 seats, 44.0%	15 seats, 41.3%	1 seats, 13.6%
Seats before	78	70	4
Seats won	22	11	4
Seats after	80	64	8
Seat change	▲2	▼6	▲4
Popular vote	70,394	56,275	32,287
Percentage	42.8%	34.2%	19.6%
Swing	▼1.2%	▼7.1%	▲6.0%
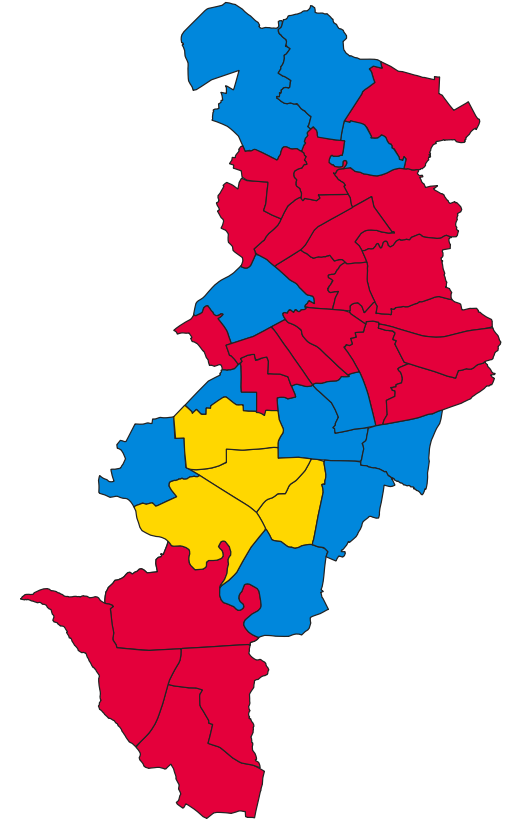
- Map of results of 1962 election
Leader of the Council before election
Labour
Leader of the Council after election
Labour

Elections to Manchester City Council were held on Thursday, 10 May 1962. One third of the councillors seats were up for election, with each successful candidate to serve a three-year term of office. The Labour Party retained overall control of the council.

== Election result ==
Party	Votes		Seats			Full Council	
Labour Party	70,394 (42.8%)	▼1.2	22 (57.9%)	22 / 38	▲2	80 (52.6%)	80 / 152
Conservative Party	56,275 (34.2%)	▼7.1	11 (28.9%)	11 / 38	▼6	64 (42.1%)	64 / 152
Liberal Party	32,287 (19.6%)	▲6.0	4 (10.5%)	4 / 38	▲4	8 (5.3%)	8 / 152
Ratepayers	2,631 (1.6%)	▼0.9	0 (0.0%)	0 / 38	Steady	0 (0.0%)	0 / 152
Union Movement	1,904 (1.2%)	▲1.1	0 (0.0%)	0 / 38	Steady	0 (0.0%)	0 / 152
Communist	1,062 (0.6%)	▲0.1	0 (0.0%)	0 / 38	Steady	0 (0.0%)	0 / 152

=== Full council ===
↓
80	8	64

=== Aldermen ===
↓
19	2	17

=== Councillors ===
↓
61	6	47

== Ward results ==
=== Alexandra Park ===
Alexandra Park
Party	Candidate	Votes	%	±%
Liberal	A. Alexander	2,538	44.1	+9.1
Conservative	H. Ward*	2,454	42.7	−11.5
Labour	G. Hayward	468	8.1	−2.7
Ratepayers	B. Shields	153	2.7	N/A
Union Movement	N. Kennedy	138	2.4	N/A
Majority		84	1.4	
Turnout		5,751		
Liberal gain from Conservative		Swing		

=== All Saints' ===
All Saints'
Party	Candidate	Votes	%	±%
Labour	F. P. Evans*	1,488	74.0	+2.5
Conservative	R. W. Phillips	392	19.5	−9.0
Union Movement	M. Kennedy	131	6.5	N/A
Majority		1,096	54.5	+11.5
Turnout		2,011		
Labour hold		Swing		

=== Ardwick ===
Ardwick
Party	Candidate	Votes	%	±%
Labour	V. Wilson*	1,842	69.9	−2.3
Conservative	G. Taylor	794	30.1	+2.3
Majority		1,048	39.8	−4.8
Turnout		2,636		
Labour hold		Swing		

=== Baguley ===
Baguley
Party	Candidate	Votes	%	±%
Labour	F. Price*	3,349	48.2	−5.0
Conservative	A. G. Oatway	2,195	31.6	−15.2
Liberal	G. A. Ruscoe	1,400	20.2	N/A
Majority		1,154	16.6	+10.2
Turnout		6,944		
Labour hold		Swing		

=== Barlow Moor ===
Barlow Moor
Party	Candidate	Votes	%	±%
Liberal	P. W. Goldstone	1,765	43.2	+0.7
Conservative	A. Hooley*	1,272	31.1	−11.3
Labour	J. L. Shelmerdine	668	16.3	+1.2
Ratepayers	T. Johnson	384	9.4	N/A
Majority		493	12.1	+12.0
Turnout		4,089		
Liberal gain from Conservative		Swing		

=== Benchill ===
Benchill
Party	Candidate	Votes	%	±%
Labour	H. S. Gatley*	3,303	51.8	+3.4
Conservative	B. Moore	1,890	29.6	−19.9
Liberal	J. Glithero	1,037	16.3	N/A
Communist	M. Taylor	151	2.3	+0.2
Majority		1,413	22.1	
Turnout		6,381		
Labour hold		Swing		

=== Beswick ===
Beswick
Party	Candidate	Votes	%	±%
Labour	J. G. Birtles*	2,341	84.0	+7.3
Conservative	S. Mottram	266	9.5	−13.8
Union Movement	D. E. Hesketh	181	6.5	N/A
Majority		2,075	74.5	+21.1
Turnout		2,788		
Labour hold		Swing		

=== Blackley ===
Blackley
Party	Candidate	Votes	%	±%
Conservative	J. A. Lynch*	2,763	42.5	−5.4
Labour	S. N. M. Moxley	1,945	29.9	−0.3
Liberal	W. Wren	1,656	25.5	+3.6
Communist	I. W. Luft	137	2.1	N/A
Majority		818	12.6	−5.1
Turnout		6,501		
Conservative hold		Swing		

=== Bradford ===
Bradford
Party	Candidate	Votes	%	±%
Labour	J. E. Jackson*	2,649	73.1	−1.1
Conservative	M. R. Chandler	974	26.9	+1.1
Majority		1,675	46.2	−2.2
Turnout		3,623		
Labour hold		Swing		

=== Burnage ===
Burnage
Party	Candidate	Votes	%	±%
Conservative	H. Platt*	2,224	38.8	−7.9
Liberal	W. Thorpe	2,149	37.6	+8.8
Labour	H. Conway	1,349	23.6	−0.9
Majority		75	1.2	−16.7
Turnout		5,722		
Conservative hold		Swing		

=== Cheetham ===
Cheetham
Party	Candidate	Votes	%	±%
Labour	M. Pariser*	1,723	48.9	−3.1
Liberal	M. Needoff	1,571	44.6	−3.4
Conservative	K. Rydings	185	5.2	N/A
Union Movement	T. J. Kay	47	1.3	N/A
Majority		152	4.3	+0.3
Turnout		3,526		
Labour hold		Swing		

=== Chorlton-cum-Hardy ===
Chorlton-cum-Hardy
Party	Candidate	Votes	%	±%
Conservative	G. W. G. Fitzsimons*	2,655	44.6	−3.5
Liberal	M. Cheers	2,108	35.4	+12.2
Labour	H. P. D. Paget	762	12.8	+0.4
Ratepayers	T. A. Harper	400	6.7	−9.6
Union Movement	L. J. Hyland	29	0.5	N/A
Majority		547	9.2	−15.7
Turnout		5,954		
Conservative hold		Swing		

=== Collegiate Church ===
Collegiate Church
Party	Candidate	Votes	%	±%
Labour	E. Mendell*	1,163	77.3	−2.8
Conservative	W. J. Pepper	178	11.8	−1.9
Communist	K. Bloch	111	7.4	+1.2
Union Movement	A. Tunnacliffe	52	3.5	N/A
Majority		985	65.5	−0.9
Turnout		1,503		
Labour hold		Swing		

=== Crumpsall ===
Crumpsall
Party	Candidate	Votes	%	±%
Conservative	F. R. Butler	2,947	35.8	−3.9
Labour	A. Zolkwer	2,904	35.2	−12.0
Liberal	A. F. Sullivan	2,389	29.0	+15.9
Majority		43	0.6	
Turnout		8,240		
Conservative hold		Swing		

=== Didsbury ===
Didsbury
Party	Candidate	Votes	%	±%
Conservative	D. Lee*	2,753	48.2	−11.6
Liberal	T. MacInerney	2,433	42.6	+11.7
Labour	A. Haslam	525	9.2	−0.1
Majority		320	5.6	−23.3
Turnout		5,711		
Conservative hold		Swing		

=== Gorton North ===
Gorton North
Party	Candidate	Votes	%	±%
Labour	W. Higgins*	3,243	73.1	+4.1
Conservative	J. Whitwell	1,191	26.9	−4.1
Majority		2,052	46.2	+8.2
Turnout		4,434		
Labour hold		Swing		

=== Gorton South ===
Gorton South
Party	Candidate	Votes	%	±%
Labour	H. Wimbury*	2,362	63.6	+5.3
Conservative	C. M. Clarke	1,351	36.4	−5.3
Majority		1,011	27.2	+10.6
Turnout		3,713		
Labour hold		Swing		

=== Harpurhey ===
Harpurhey
Party	Candidate	Votes	%	±%
Labour	E. Grant*	2,115	64.6	+9.8
Conservative	R. Hardy	1,092	33.4	−11.8
Union Movement	R. Kershaw	67	2.0	N/A
Majority		1,023	31.2	+21.6
Turnout		3,274		
Labour hold		Swing		

=== Hugh Oldham ===
Hugh Oldham
Party	Candidate	Votes	%	±%
Labour	J. B. Ogden*	1,441	78.2	+7.1
Conservative	M. J. K. McGregor	245	13.3	−8.6
Communist	E. Cohen	115	6.2	−0.8
Union Movement	E. Keeling	43	2.3	N/A
Majority		1,196	64.9	+15.7
Turnout		1,844		
Labour hold		Swing		

=== Levenshulme ===
Levenshulme
Party	Candidate	Votes	%	±%
Conservative	R. A. Fieldhouse*	2,139	38.2	+0.9
Labour	A. Hardisty	1,349	24.1	+6.0
Ratepayers	J. A. Gannon	1,057	18.9	−10.2
Liberal	S. W. Chinn	1,043	18.6	+3.1
Union Movement	W. Hesketh	51	0.9	N/A
Majority		790	14.1	+5.9
Turnout		5,593		
Conservative hold		Swing		

=== Lightbowne ===
Lightbowne
Party	Candidate	Votes	%	±%
Conservative	H. Pigott*	2,633	38.6	−0.6
Labour	G. Halstead	2,394	35.1	−6.4
Liberal	E. Platt	1,551	22.7	+3.6
Ratepayers	E. Alderton	247	3.6	N/A
Majority		239	3.5	
Turnout		6,825		
Conservative hold		Swing		

=== Longsight ===
Longsight
Party	Candidate	Votes	%	±%
Conservative	H. Sharp*	2,121	57.3	+4.7
Labour	A. Smith	1,334	36.0	+9.0
Communist	H. Johnson	155	4.2	+1.0
Union Movement	F. Dewhurst	93	2.5	N/A
Majority		787	21.3	−4.3
Turnout		3,703		
Conservative hold		Swing		

=== Miles Platting ===
Miles Platting
Party	Candidate	Votes	%	±%
Labour	C. R. Morris*	1,803	65.6	+5.3
Conservative	J. H. Tresman	872	31.8	−8.1
Union Movement	C. D. Draffin	71	2.6	N/A
Majority		931	33.8	+13.2
Turnout		2,746		
Labour hold		Swing		

=== Moss Side East ===
Moss Side East
Party	Candidate	Votes	%	±%
Labour	W. A. Downward*	1,763	47.0	+2.0
Conservative	A. H. Burlin	1,600	42.7	−12.3
Ratepayers	G. J. Playford	208	5.5	N/A
Union Movement	M. E. Hesketh	119	3.2	N/A
Communist	L. B. Johnson	60	1.6	N/A
Majority		163	4.3	−5.7
Turnout		3,750		
Labour hold		Swing		

=== Moss Side West ===
Moss Side West
Party	Candidate	Votes	%	±%
Conservative	S. D. Alexander	1,763	42.9	−6.1
Labour	R. E. Talbot	1,208	29.4	−4.7
Liberal	M. McCann	1,048	25.5	N/A
Union Movement	G. A. Webb	94	2.2	−2.2
Majority		555	13.5	−1.4
Turnout		4,113		
Conservative hold		Swing		

=== Moston ===
Moston
Party	Candidate	Votes	%	±%
Labour	R. Latham	3,271	46.3	+0.2
Conservative	K. E. Goulding*	2,341	33.1	−4.3
Liberal	J. Bulmer	1,451	20.6	+4.1
Majority		930	13.2	+4.5
Turnout		7,063		
Labour gain from Conservative		Swing		

=== New Cross ===
New Cross
Party	Candidate	Votes	%	±%
Labour	W. Murray*	1,238	80.9	+7.7
Conservative	D. C. Cooper	203	13.3	−13.5
Union Movement	J. J. Boyle	88	5.8	N/A
Majority		1,035	67.7	+21.3
Turnout		1,529		
Labour hold		Swing		

=== Newton Heath ===
Newton Heath
Party	Candidate	Votes	%	±%
Labour	W. Lister*	2,219	66.1	+10.6
Conservative	K. A. Edis	1,038	30.9	−11.3
Union Movement	C. Gee	98	3.0	N/A
Majority		1,181	35.2	+21.9
Turnout		3,355		
Labour hold		Swing		

=== Northenden ===
Northenden
Party	Candidate	Votes	%	±%
Labour	R. L. Griffiths	2,680	34.6	+0.1
Liberal	R. H. Hargreaves	2,633	34.0	+6.5
Conservative	E. Walmsley*	2,441	31.4	−6.6
Majority		47	0.5	
Turnout		7,754		
Labour gain from Conservative		Swing		

=== Old Moat ===
Old Moat
Party	Candidate	Votes	%	±%
Liberal	T. Kay	1,793	41.9	+4.2
Conservative	W. Sharp*	1,560	36.5	−6.9
Labour	R. B. Davies	924	21.6	+2.7
Majority		233	5.4	
Turnout		4,277		
Liberal gain from Conservative		Swing		

=== Openshaw ===
Openshaw
Party	Candidate	Votes	%	±%
Labour	M. E. Morley*	2,775	72.6	+5.7
Conservative	H. Woodman	876	22.9	−7.1
Communist	H. Holland	123	3.2	+0.1
Union Movement	W. D. Hesketh	49	1.3	N/A
Majority		1,899	49.7	+12.8
Turnout		3,823		
Labour hold		Swing		

=== Rusholme ===
Rusholme
Party	Candidate	Votes	%	±%
Conservative	K. Ollerenshaw*	2,020	46.9	−9.6
Liberal	F. N. Wedlock	1,148	26.6	+4.0
Labour	D. A. Warby	958	22.2	+1.3
Ratepayers	J. H. Edward	182	4.2	N/A
Majority		872	20.3	−13.6
Turnout		4,308		
Conservative hold		Swing		

=== St. George's ===
St. George's
Party	Candidate	Votes	%	±%
Labour	G. Mann*	1,918	71.9	+2.5
Conservative	N. P. Delayen	624	23.4	−7.2
Union Movement	N. Edwards	124	4.7	N/A
Majority		1,294	48.5	+9.7
Turnout		2,666		
Labour hold		Swing		

=== St. Luke's ===
St. Luke's
Party	Candidate	Votes	%	±%
Labour	W. Massey*	1,896	63.7	+9.8
Conservative	W. Ricketts	981	33.0	−7.6
Union Movement	P. Edwards	99	3.3	N/A
Majority		915	30.7	+17.4
Turnout		2,976		
Labour hold		Swing		

=== St. Mark's ===
St. Mark's
Party	Candidate	Votes	%	±%
Labour	N. Morris*	2,416	69.8	+5.6
Conservative	E. Geddes	1,047	30.2	−5.6
Majority		1,369	39.6	+11.2
Turnout		3,463		
Labour hold		Swing		

=== St. Peter's ===
St. Peter's
Party	Candidate	Votes	%	±%
Conservative	J. Carson*	912	50.0	−11.1
Labour	J. Davis	582	31.9	−7.0
Union Movement	G. S. Gee	330	18.1	N/A
Majority		330	18.1	−4.1
Turnout		1,824		
Conservative hold		Swing		

=== Withington ===
Withington
Party	Candidate	Votes	%	±%
Liberal	J. S. Alldridge	2,574	47.2	+4.3
Conservative	W. H. Scholfield*	2,357	43.2	−3.7
Labour	A. J. Bateman	523	9.6	−0.6
Majority		217	4.0	
Turnout		5,454		
Liberal gain from Conservative		Swing		

=== Woodhouse Park ===
Woodhouse Park
Party	Candidate	Votes	%	±%
Labour	H. Reid*	3,503	75.5	+2.4
Conservative	A. Thurston	926	20.0	−6.9
Communist	E. Holt	210	4.5	N/A
Majority		2,577	55.5	+9.3
Turnout		4,639		
Labour hold		Swing		

== Aldermanic elections ==
=== Aldermanic election, 4 July 1962 ===
Caused by the death on 20 May 1962 of Alderman H. P. J. Hinderer (Labour, elected as an alderman by the council on 5 April 1961).

In his place, Councillor Hyman Goldstone (Labour, Cheetham, elected 1 November 1945) was elected as an alderman by the council on 4 July 1962.

Party	Alderman	Ward	Term expires
Labour	Hyman Goldstone	Beswick	1967

=== Aldermanic election, 25 July 1962 ===
Caused by the death on 27 June 1962 of Alderman William Winstanley (Labour, elected as an alderman by the council on 4 April 1956).

In his place, Councillor Clifford Lamb (Labour, Moston, elected 1 November 1945) was elected as an alderman by the council on 25 July 1962.

Party	Alderman	Ward	Term expires
Labour	Clifford Lamb	Bradford	1967

=== Aldermanic election, 5 September 1962 ===
Caused by the death on 17 August 1962 of Alderman John Sutton (Labour, elected as an alderman by the council on 2 February 1955).

In his place, Councillor Ernest Kirkman (Labour, Gorton South, elected 1 November 1945) was elected as an alderman by the council on 5 September 1962.

Party	Alderman	Ward	Term expires
Labour	Ernest Kirkman	Rusholme	1967

=== Aldermanic election, 6 February 1963 ===
Caused by the death on 21 January 1963 of Alderman Arthur Donovan (Labour, elected as an alderman by the council on 19 February 1958).

In his place, Councillor Rachel Finkel (Labour, Collegiate Church, elected 1 November 1945) was elected as an alderman by the council on 6 February 1963.

Party	Alderman	Ward	Term expires
Labour	Rachel Finkel	Cheetham	1967

== By-elections between 1962 and 1963 ==
=== By-elections, 13 September 1962 ===
Two by-elections were held on 13 September 1962 to fill vacancies that were created by the appointment of aldermen on 4 July and 25 July 1962.

==== Cheetham ====
Caused by the election as an alderman of Councillor Hyman Goldstone (Labour, Cheetham, elected 1 November 1945) on 4 July 1962, following the death on 20 May 1962 of Alderman H. P. J. Hinderer (Labour, elected as an alderman by the council on 5 April 1961).

Cheetham
Party	Candidate	Votes	%	±%
Liberal	M. Needoff	1,289	45.6	+1.0
Labour	B. Lawson	1,227	43.4	−5.5
Conservative	K. Rydings	308	11.0	+5.8
Majority		62	2.2	
Turnout		2,824		
Liberal gain from Labour		Swing		

==== Moston ====
Caused by the election as an alderman of Councillor Clifford Lamb (Labour, Moston, elected 1 November 1945) on 25 July 1962, following the death on 27 June 1962 of Alderman William Winstanley (Labour, elected as an alderman by the council on 4 April 1956).

Moston
Party	Candidate	Votes	%	±%
Labour	G. Halstead	2,367	40.9	−5.4
Conservative	K. E. Goulding	1,966	34.0	+0.9
Liberal	J. Bulmer	1,452	25.1	+4.5
Majority		401	6.9	−6.3
Turnout		5,785		
Labour hold		Swing		

=== Gorton South, 18 October 1962 ===
Caused by the election as an alderman of Councillor Ernest Kirkman (Labour, Gorton South, elected 1 November 1945) on 5 September 1962, following the death on 17 August 1962 of Alderman John Sutton (Labour, elected as an alderman by the council on 2 February 1955).

Gorton South
Party	Candidate	Votes	%	±%
Labour	D. Barker	1,806	59.2	−4.4
Liberal	P. A. G. Sharp	648	21.2	N/A
Conservative	J. Whitwell	598	19.6	−16.8
Majority		1,158	38.0	+10.8
Turnout		3,052		
Labour hold		Swing		

=== Hugh Oldham, 7 March 1963 ===
Caused by the death of Councillor Herbert Langan (Labour, Hugh Oldham, elected 8 May 1958) on 31 October 1963.

Hugh Oldham
Party	Candidate	Votes	%	±%
Labour	A. Nicholson	946	84.0	+5.8
Conservative	J. H. Tresman	112	9.9	−3.4
Independent	R. J. Marsden	68	6.1	N/A
Majority		834	74.1	+9.2
Turnout		1,126		
Labour hold		Swing		
