= 1969 Manchester City Council election =

UK local government election

- 8 May 1969

39 of 152 seats to Manchester City Council 77 seats needed for a majority
	First party	Second party
Party	Conservative	Labour
Last election	33 seats, 62.4%	8 seats, 29.3%
Seats before	93	59
Seats won	24	15
Seats after	99	53
Seat change	▲6	▼6
Popular vote	73,446	45,073
Percentage	57.8%	35.5%
Swing	▼4.6%	▲6.2%
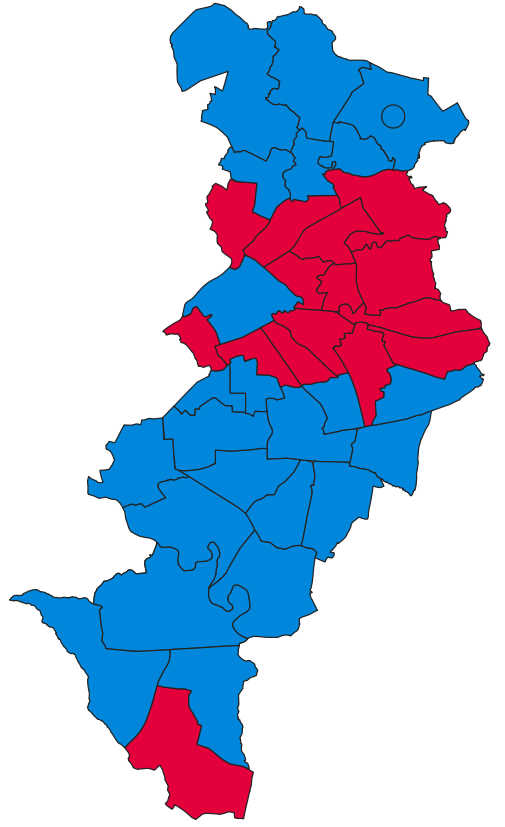
- Map of results of 1969 election
Leader of the Council before election
Conservative
Leader of the Council after election
Conservative

Elections to Manchester City Council were held on Thursday, 8 May 1969. One third of the councillors seats were up for election, with each successful candidate to serve a three-year term of office. The Conservative Party retained overall control of the council.

== Election result ==
Party	Votes		Seats			Full Council	
Conservative Party	73,446 (57.8%)	▼4.6	24 (61.5%)	24 / 39	▲6	99 (65.1%)	99 / 152
Labour Party	45,073 (35.5%)	▲6.2	15 (38.5%)	15 / 39	▼6	53 (34.9%)	53 / 152
Liberal Party	7,400 (5.8%)	▼1.4	0 (0.0%)	0 / 39	Steady	0 (0.0%)	0 / 152
Communist	892 (0.7%)	▼0.2	0 (0.0%)	0 / 39	Steady	0 (0.0%)	0 / 152
Union Movement	230 (0.2%)	▲0.1	0 (0.0%)	0 / 39	Steady	0 (0.0%)	0 / 152
Residents	56 (0.0%)	Steady	0 (0.0%)	0 / 39	Steady	0 (0.0%)	0 / 152

=== Full council ===
↓
53	99

=== Aldermen ===
↓
19	19

=== Councillors ===
↓
34	74

== Ward results ==
=== Alexandra Park ===
Alexandra Park
Party	Candidate	Votes	%	±%
Conservative	N. Thompson*	3,405	69.3	−1.5
Liberal	E. O. Tomlinson	1,125	22.9	−0.5
Labour	K. McKeon	489	9.7	+1.8
Majority		2,280	45.4	0
Turnout		5,019		
Conservative hold		Swing		

=== All Saints' ===
All Saints'
Party	Candidate	Votes	%	±%
Labour	F. Hatton*	448	60.8	+8.5
Conservative	F. Hewerdine	289	39.2	−8.5
Majority		159	21.6	+17.0
Turnout		737		
Labour hold		Swing		

=== Ardwick ===
Ardwick
Party	Candidate	Votes	%	±%
Labour	H. Barrett*	686	51.9	+9.8
Conservative	A. E. Welsby	636	48.1	−9.8
Majority		50	3.8	
Turnout		1,322		
Labour hold		Swing		

=== Baguley ===
Baguley
Party	Candidate	Votes	%	±%
Conservative	G. I. Woolard	3,013	55.5	−3.0
Labour	R. A. Reddington*	2,413	44.5	+9.5
Majority		600	11.0	−12.5
Turnout		5,426		
Conservative gain from Labour		Swing		

=== Barlow Moor ===
Barlow Moor
Party	Candidate	Votes	%	±%
Conservative	H. Tucker*	2,049	59.6	+1.7
Liberal	A. J. Markin	789	22.9	−4.9
Labour	W. A. Moody	600	17.5	+3.2
Majority		1,260	36.7	+6.6
Turnout		3,438		
Conservative hold		Swing		

=== Benchill ===
Benchill
Party	Candidate	Votes	%	±%
Conservative	N. Pritchard*	2,921	59.6	−1.8
Labour	R. L. Griffiths	1,860	38.0	+2.2
Communist	M. Taylor	120	2.4	−0.4
Majority		1,061	21.6	−4.0
Turnout		4,901		
Conservative hold		Swing		

=== Beswick ===
Beswick
Party	Candidate	Votes	%	±%
Labour	K. Eastham*	994	67.5	+5.3
Conservative	E. M. Bevan	478	32.5	−5.3
Majority		516	35.0	+10.6
Turnout		1,472		
Labour hold		Swing		

=== Blackley ===
Blackley
Party	Candidate	Votes	%	±%
Conservative	E. D. Kirkup*	2,503	62.4	−9.6
Labour	A. E. Bowden	752	18.7	+2.7
Liberal	J. M. Ashley	701	17.5	+5.6
Communist	I. W. Luft	57	1.4	N/A
Majority		1,751	43.6	−12.4
Turnout		4,013		
Conservative hold		Swing		

=== Bradford ===
Bradford
Party	Candidate	Votes	%	±%
Labour	J. Taylor*	2,404	59.7	+15.3
Conservative	A. W. Ash	1,623	40.3	−12.7
Majority		781	19.4	
Turnout		4,027		
Labour hold		Swing		

=== Burnage ===
Burnage
Party	Candidate	Votes	%	±%
Conservative	W. L. Lund*	2,788	61.2	−7.3
Labour	S. H. Higgins	1,082	23.7	+4.4
Liberal	P. J. Brindle	689	15.1	+2.9
Majority		1,706	37.5	−11.7
Turnout		4,559		
Conservative hold		Swing		

=== Cheetham ===
Cheetham
Party	Candidate	Votes	%	±%
Conservative	A. Fildes	1,118	51.7	−6.9
Labour	B. Lawson*	932	43.1	+8.0
Communist	H. Ogden	113	5.2	−1.1
Majority		186	8.6	−14.9
Turnout		2,163		
Conservative gain from Labour		Swing		

=== Chorlton-cum-Hardy ===
Chorlton-cum-Hardy
Party	Candidate	Votes	%	±%
Conservative	M. A. Vince*	3,395	83.0	−3.3
Labour	S. C. Silverman	696	17.0	+3.3
Majority		2,699	66.0	−6.6
Turnout		4,091		
Conservative hold		Swing		

=== Collegiate Church ===
Collegiate Church
Party	Candidate	Votes	%	±%
Labour	S. A. Ogden*	522	66.9	+12.7
Conservative	R. J. R. Lomas	212	27.2	−13.6
Communist	E. A. Whinney	46	5.9	+0.9
Majority		310	39.7	+26.3
Turnout		780		
Labour hold		Swing		

=== Crumpsall ===
Crumpsall
Party	Candidate	Votes	%	±%
Conservative	B. H. Taylor*	3,409	67.6	+7.6
Labour	W. Egerton	1,632	32.4	−7.6
Majority		1,777	35.2	+15.2
Turnout		5,041		
Conservative hold		Swing		

=== Didsbury ===
Didsbury
Party	Candidate	Votes	%	±%
Conservative	J. Duke	3,604	71.5	−6.7
Liberal	S. B. Downs	846	16.8	+6.8
Labour	H. Brown	589	11.7	−0.1
Majority		2,758	54.7	−11.7
Turnout		5,039		
Conservative hold		Swing		

=== Gorton North ===
Gorton North
Party	Candidate	Votes	%	±%
Labour	P. Roddy*	2,692	56.8	+13.6
Conservative	B. Connell	2,051	43.2	−9.3
Majority		641	13.6	
Turnout		4,743		
Labour hold		Swing		

=== Gorton South ===
Gorton South
Party	Candidate	Votes	%	±%
Conservative	V. R. Cattan	1,757	50.8	−6.0
Labour	D. Barker*	1,700	49.2	+6.0
Majority		57	1.6	−12.0
Turnout		3,457		
Conservative gain from Labour		Swing		

=== Harpurhey ===
Harpurhey
Party	Candidate	Votes	%	±%
Conservative	V. M. Taylor	1,209	58.5	−0.5
Labour	A. O'Toole*	858	41.5	+0.5
Majority		351	17.0	−1.0
Turnout		2,067		
Conservative gain from Labour		Swing		

=== Hugh Oldham ===
Hugh Oldham
Party	Candidate	Votes	%	±%
Labour	S. V. Shaw*	767	55.5	−2.6
Conservative	R. E. Lilley	317	22.9	−13.0
Liberal	L. J. Howard	299	21.6	+15.6
Majority		450	32.6	+10.4
Turnout		1,383		
Labour hold		Swing		

=== Levenshulme ===
Levenshulme
Party	Candidate	Votes	%	±%
Conservative	C. R. Robb*	2,755	76.5	+2.3
Labour	A. E. Jones	844	23.5	+6.4
Majority		1,911	53.0	−4.1
Turnout		3,599		
Conservative hold		Swing		

=== Lightbowne ===
Lightbowne
Party	Candidate	Votes	%	±%
Conservative	F. Taylor	2,318	46.1	−15.8
Labour	L. Kelly*	1,535	30.5	−5.2
Liberal	H. Roche	1,097	21.8	N/A
Communist	R. Cole	83	1.6	−0.8
Majority		783	15.6	−10.6
Turnout		5,033		
Conservative gain from Labour		Swing		

=== Longsight ===
Longsight
Party	Candidate	Votes	%	±%
Conservative	F. J. Dunn*	1,650	77.5	−0.6
Labour	J. Broderick	291	13.7	+0.2
Union Movement	G. S. Gee	98	4.6	+1.1
Communist	H. Johnson	91	4.3	−0.6
Majority		1,359	63.8	−0.8
Turnout		2,130		
Conservative hold		Swing		

=== Miles Platting ===
Miles Platting
Party	Candidate	Votes	%	±%
Labour	J. S. Goldstone*	1,484	63.3	+15.8
Conservative	E. Smith	860	36.7	−15.8
Majority		624	26.6	+21.6
Turnout		2,344		
Labour hold		Swing		

=== Moss Side East ===
Moss Side East
Party	Candidate	Votes	%	±%
Conservative	P. M. Nixon	1,457	59.7	+3.9
Labour	A. J. Bateman*	985	40.3	+2.4
Majority		472	19.4	+1.5
Turnout		2,442		
Conservative gain from Labour		Swing		

=== Moss Side West ===
Moss Side West
Party	Candidate	Votes	%	±%
Conservative	A. H. Burlin*	1,773	75.4	−0.9
Labour	S. N. M. Moxley	464	19.7	+4.2
Communist	W. Woolery	113	4.8	N/A
Majority		1,309	55.7	−5.1
Turnout		2,350		
Conservative hold		Swing		

=== Moston ===
Moston (2 vacancies)
Party	Candidate	Votes	%	±%
Conservative	J. T. Crawford	3,006	65.6	−2.8
Conservative	A. Wray*	2,894	63.2	−5.2
Labour	K. Franklin	1,736	37.9	+6.3
Labour	J. E. Jackson	1,527	33.3	+1.7
Majority		1,158	25.3	−11.5
Turnout		4,582		
Conservative hold		Swing		
Conservative hold		Swing		

=== New Cross ===
New Cross
Party	Candidate	Votes	%	±%
Labour	E. Crank*	997	66.2	+8.1
Conservative	R. R. E. Sproston	508	33.8	−8.1
Majority		489	32.4	+16.2
Turnout		1,505		
Labour hold		Swing		

=== Newton Heath ===
Newton Heath
Party	Candidate	Votes	%	±%
Labour	C. Tomlinson	1,900	53.1	+8.2
Conservative	J. Coleclough	1,584	44.3	−2.4
Communist	R. Jackson	94	2.6	N/A
Majority		316	8.8	
Turnout		3,578		
Labour hold		Swing		

=== Northenden ===
Northenden
Party	Candidate	Votes	%	±%
Conservative	C. H. Box	3,746	67.6	+5.4
Labour	D. Healey	1,793	32.4	+6.7
Majority		1,953	35.3	−1.2
Turnout		5,539		
Conservative hold		Swing		

=== Old Moat ===
Old Moat
Party	Candidate	Votes	%	±%
Conservative	D. G. Massey*	2,370	74.4	+5.8
Labour	A. Holland	815	25.6	+3.1
Majority		1,555	48.8	+2.7
Turnout		3,185		
Conservative hold		Swing		

=== Openshaw ===
Openshaw
Party	Candidate	Votes	%	±%
Labour	T. O. Hamnett*	1,795	54.4	+6.3
Conservative	E. Eccles	1,502	45.6	−0.1
Majority		293	8.8	+6.4
Turnout		3,297		
Labour hold		Swing		

=== Rusholme ===
Rusholme
Party	Candidate	Votes	%	±%
Conservative	T. R. Phillips	2,227	68.3	−9.2
Liberal	S. Lowe	642	19.7	+10.5
Labour	S. A. Heylin	393	12.0	−1.3
Majority		1,585	48.6	−6.6
Turnout		3,262		
Conservative hold		Swing		

=== St. George's ===
St. George's
Party	Candidate	Votes	%	±%
Labour	K. Collis*	556	58.7	+0.1
Conservative	T. J. Casby	391	41.3	−0.1
Majority		165	17.4	+0.2
Turnout		947		
Labour hold		Swing		

=== St. Luke's ===
St. Luke's
Party	Candidate	Votes	%	±%
Labour	W. Massey	796	53.7	+5.1
Conservative	A. P. Osborn	686	46.3	−5.1
Majority		110	7.4	
Turnout		1,482		
Labour hold		Swing		

=== St. Mark's ===
St. Mark's
Party	Candidate	Votes	%	±%
Labour	J. T. Morgan*	1,343	47.5	−1.6
Conservative	C. R. Savage	1,295	45.8	+1.9
Union Movement	D. S. Lawson	132	4.7	+0.4
Residents	A. W. King	56	2.0	−0.6
Majority		48	1.7	−3.5
Turnout		2,826		
Labour hold		Swing		

=== St. Peter's ===
St. Peter's
Party	Candidate	Votes	%	±%
Conservative	J. Carson*	718	78.0	+8.3
Labour	B. S. Jeuda	202	22.0	−0.7
Majority		516	56.0	+10.5
Turnout		920		
Conservative hold		Swing		

=== Withington ===
Withington
Party	Candidate	Votes	%	±%
Conservative	E. R. Coker*	2,522	59.4	+2.1
Liberal	G. Fawdrey	1,212	28.6	−0.3
Labour	J. L. Shelmerdine	510	12.0	−1.8
Majority		1,310	30.9	+2.5
Turnout		4,244		
Conservative hold		Swing		

=== Woodhouse Park ===
Woodhouse Park
Party	Candidate	Votes	%	±%
Labour	K. Roberts	2,991	53.7	+9.3
Conservative	H. Horton	2,407	43.2	−3.2
Communist	E. Holt	175	3.1	+0.9
Majority		584	10.5	
Turnout		5,573		
Labour hold		Swing		

== Aldermanic election ==
=== Aldermanic election, 1 April 1970 ===
Caused by the disqualification on 26 March 1970 of Alderman Ottiwell Lodge (Conservative, elected as an alderman by the council on 4 August 1965).

In his place, Councillor F. J. Dunn (Conservative, Longsight, elected 13 May 1954) was elected as an alderman by the council on 1 April 1970.

Party	Alderman	Ward	Term expires
Conservative	F. J. Dunn	Burnage	1970

== By-elections between 1969 and 1970 ==
=== By-elections, 18 September 1969 ===
Two by-elections were held on 18 September 1969 to fill vacancies which had arisen in the city council.

==== Newton Heath ====
Caused by the death of Councillor John Foran (Conservative, Newton Heath, elected 9 May 1968) on 18 June 1969.

Newton Heath
Party	Candidate	Votes	%	±%
Labour	H. W. Bliss	1,730	57.9	+4.8
Conservative	W. Ash	1,193	39.9	−4.4
Communist	P. Cole	64	2.2	−0.4
Majority		537	18.0	+9.2
Turnout		2,987		
Labour gain from Conservative		Swing		

==== St. Mark's ====
Caused by the death of Councillor James Morgan (Labour, St. Mark's, elected 12 May 1966) on 27 June 1969.

St. Mark's
Party	Candidate	Votes	%	±%
Labour	W. A. Downward	1,700	56.3	+8.8
Conservative	C. R. Savage	1,318	43.7	−2.1
Majority		382	12.6	+10.9
Turnout		3,018		
Labour hold		Swing		
