= 1986 Manchester City Council election =

1986 UK local government election

- 8 May 1986

34 of 99 seats to Manchester City Council 50 seats needed for a majority
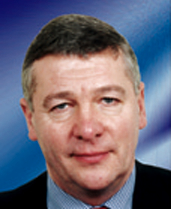
	First party	Second party	Third party
Leader	Graham Stringer	Harold Tucker	David Sandiford
Party	Labour	Conservative	Alliance
Leader's seat	Harpurhey	Barlow Moor stood down	Withington
Last election	29 seats, 57.0%	4 seats, 27.2%	2 seats, 15.4%
Seats before	79	14	6
Seats won	31	1	2
Seats after	86	7	6
Seat change	▲7	▼7	Steady
Popular vote	74,943	26,226	24,942
Percentage	58.1%	20.3%	19.3%
Swing	▲1.1%	▼6.9%	▲3.9%
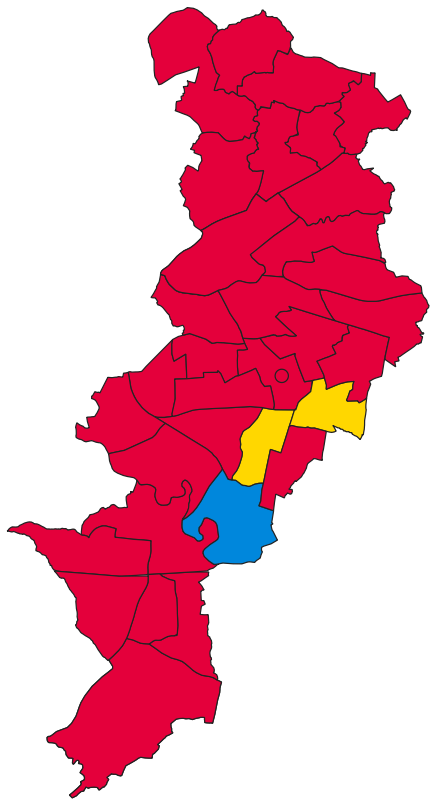
- Map of results of 1986 election
Leader of the Council before election
Graham Stringer
Labour
Leader of the Council after election
Graham Stringer
Labour

Elections to Manchester City Council were held on Thursday, 8 May 1986. One third of the council was up for election, with each successful candidate to serve a four-year term of office, expiring in 1990. The Labour Party retained overall control of the Council.

The Independent candidates for the Benchill and Woodhouse Park wards, A. Bradshaw and D. Wraxall respectively, were backed by the SDP/Liberal Alliance.

== Election result ==
Party	Votes		Seats			Full Council	
Labour Party	74,943 (58.1%)	▲1.1	31 (91.2%)	31 / 34	▲7	86 (86.8%)	86 / 99
Conservative Party	26,226 (20.3%)	▼6.9	1 (2.9%)	1 / 34	▼7	7 (7.1%)	7 / 99
Alliance	24,942 (19.3%)	▲3.9	2 (5.9%)	2 / 34	Steady	6 (6.1%)	6 / 99
Independent	1,410 (1.1%)	▲1.0	0 (0.0%)	0 / 34	Steady	0 (0.0%)	0 / 99
Green Party	1,091 (0.8%)	N/A	0 (0.0%)	0 / 34	N/A	0 (0.0%)	0 / 99
Communist	167 (0.1%)	Steady	0 (0.0%)	0 / 34	Steady	0 (0.0%)	0 / 99
National Front	165 (0.1%)	Steady	0 (0.0%)	0 / 34	Steady	0 (0.0%)	0 / 99

↓
86	6	7

== Ward results ==
=== Ardwick ===
Ardwick
Party	Candidate	Votes	%	±%
Labour	H. Barrett*	2,040	79.4	+2.9
Conservative	J. Clough	276	10.7	−5.2
Liberal	R. Axtell	252	9.8	+2.2
Majority		1,764	68.7	+8.2
Turnout		2,568		
Labour hold		Swing	+4.0	

=== Baguley ===
Baguley
Party	Candidate	Votes	%	±%
Labour	F. Done*	2,666	73.3	+6.7
Conservative	S. Lawley	969	26.7	+1.6
Majority		1,697	46.7	+5.3
Turnout		3,635		
Labour hold		Swing	+2.5	

=== Barlow Moor ===
Barlow Moor
Party	Candidate	Votes	%	±%
Labour	J. Wilner	1,955	46.7	+0.2
SDP	S. Gluck	1,334	31.9	+13.3
Conservative	C. Dewsbury	758	18.1	−16.8
Green	B. Candeland	140	3.3	+3.3
Majority		621	14.8	+3.2
Turnout		4,187		
Labour gain from Conservative		Swing	-6.5	

=== Benchill ===
Benchill
Party	Candidate	Votes	%	±%
Labour	A. Home*	2,157	72.4	−3.3
Independent	A. Bradshaw	567	19.0	+19.0
Conservative	D. Hurst	256	16.1	+1.1
Majority		1,590	53.4	−7.3
Turnout		2,980		
Labour hold		Swing	-11.1	

=== Beswick and Clayton ===
Beswick and Clayton
Party	Candidate	Votes	%	±%
Labour	Bill Egerton*	2,046	74.0	−2.2
Conservative	D. Eager	392	14.2	−2.8
SDP	V. Cahill	146	5.3	+0.7
Independent	F. Wolstencroft	115	4.2	+4.2
National Front	J. Hulse	64	2.3	+0.2
Majority		1,654	59.9	+0.7
Turnout		2,763		
Labour hold		Swing	+0.3	

=== Blackley ===
Blackley
Party	Candidate	Votes	%	±%
Labour	G. Chadwick*	2,379	65.6	−0.6
Conservative	K. Potter	744	20.5	−3.2
Liberal	J. Cookson	455	12.5	+2.4
National Front	C. Ballantyne	49	1.4	+1.4
Majority		1,635	45.1	+2.7
Turnout		3,627		
Labour hold		Swing	+1.3	

=== Bradford ===
Bradford
Party	Candidate	Votes	%	±%
Labour	J. Gilmore*	2,175	78.8	−0.5
Conservative	M. Payne	334	12.1	−0.9
Liberal	S. Lewis	250	9.1	+1.4
Majority		1,841	66.7	+0.3
Turnout		2,759		
Labour hold		Swing	+0.2	

=== Brooklands ===
Brooklands
Party	Candidate	Votes	%	±%
Labour	F. Hatton	2,059	48.6	−0.7
Conservative	A. O'Connor	1,540	36.3	−2.9
SDP	C. Duffy	641	15.1	+3.7
Majority		519	12.2	+2.1
Turnout		4,240		
Labour gain from Conservative		Swing	+1.1	

=== Burnage ===
Burnage
Party	Candidate	Votes	%	±%
Labour	R. Whyte	2,412	48.8	−0.1
Conservative	L. Houston	1,231	24.9	−12.5
SDP	A. Muir	749	15.2	+1.5
Green	J. Foster	74	1.5	+1.5
Majority		1,181	23.9	+12.3
Turnout		4,943		
Labour gain from Conservative		Swing	+6.2	

=== Central ===
Central
Party	Candidate	Votes	%	±%
Labour	T. Findlow	1,545	79.6	−2.5
Conservative	A. Hudson	222	11.4	−1.8
SDP	M. Lockwood	175	9.0	+4.3
Majority		1,323	68.1	−0.9
Turnout		1,942		
Labour hold		Swing	-0.3	

=== Charlestown ===
Charlestown
Party	Candidate	Votes	%	±%
Labour	S. McCardell	2,541	63.5	+4.1
Conservative	M. Jones	934	23.3	−6.0
SDP	E. Watts	526	13.1	+1.9
Majority		1,607	40.2	+10.1
Turnout		4,001		
Labour hold		Swing	+5.0	

=== Cheetham ===
Cheetham
Party	Candidate	Votes	%	±%
Labour	S. Shaw*	2,674	79.9	+11.9
SDP	R. Harrison	673	20.1	−2.8
Majority		2,001	59.8	+14.8
Turnout		3,347		
Labour hold		Swing	+7.3	

=== Chorlton ===
Chorlton
Party	Candidate	Votes	%	±%
Labour	D. Black	2,848	48.2	+7.1
Conservative	J. Kershaw	2,244	38.0	−4.3
Liberal	W. Paver	776	13.1	−1.6
Communist	M. Waterfield	35	0.6	−1.2
Majority		604	10.2	+9.0
Turnout		5,903		
Labour gain from Conservative		Swing	+5.7	

=== Crumpsall ===
Crumpsall
Party	Candidate	Votes	%	±%
Labour	M. Hackett	1,997	49.7	+0.3
Conservative	G. Fildes	1,248	31.0	−7.8
SDP	H. Showman	775	19.3	+7.5
Majority		749	18.6	+8.0
Turnout		4,020		
Labour gain from Conservative		Swing	+4.0	

=== Didsbury ===
Didsbury
Party	Candidate	Votes	%	±%
Conservative	J. Hill*	2,575	43.4	−5.1
Labour	G. Bridson	1,896	32.0	+3.0
SDP	A. J. Bateman	1,345	22.7	+0.2
Green	R. Riesco	116	2.0	+2.0
Majority		679	11.4	−8.1
Turnout		5,932		
Conservative hold		Swing	-4.0	

=== Fallowfield ===
Fallowfield
Party	Candidate	Votes	%	±%
Labour	P. Morrison*	2,180	54.6	+0.6
Conservative	S. Keegin	848	21.2	−13.6
SDP	G. Nevins	794	19.9	+8.7
Green	R. Waters	173	4.3	+4.3
Majority		1,332	33.3	+14.1
Turnout		3,995		
Labour hold		Swing	+7.1	

=== Gorton North ===
Gorton North
Party	Candidate	Votes	%	±%
Labour	C. Brierley*	2,759	68.3	−0.6
Conservative	N. Dentith	666	16.5	−6.5
SDP	S. Wheale	570	14.1	+6.0
Communist	M. Molloy	46	1.1	+1.1
Majority		2,093	51.8	+5.9
Turnout		4,041		
Labour hold		Swing	+2.9	

=== Gorton South ===
Gorton South
Party	Candidate	Votes	%	±%
Labour	D. Barker*	2,142	57.6	−6.5
Liberal	J. Ashley	1,165	31.3	+10.4
Conservative	T. Grimshaw	410	11.0	−4.4
Majority		977	26.3	−16.6
Turnout		3,717		
Labour hold		Swing	-8.4	

=== Harpurhey ===
Harpurhey
Party	Candidate	Votes	%	±%
Labour	Patrick Karney*	2,002	70.4	+2.1
SDP	G. Landsman	435	15.3	+1.2
Conservative	E. Dimmock	407	14.3	−3.3
Majority		1,567	55.1	+4.4
Turnout		2,844		
Labour hold		Swing	+0.4	

=== Hulme ===
Hulme
Party	Candidate	Votes	%	±%
Labour	D. Lunts	2,080	81.6	+1.0
Liberal	H. Feazey	246	9.7	+2.4
Conservative	R. Lamptey	223	8.7	−3.4
Majority		1,857	72.9	+4.4
Turnout		2,549		
Labour hold		Swing	-0.7	

=== Levenshulme ===
Levenshulme
Party	Candidate	Votes	%	±%
Liberal	Keith Whitmore*	2,637	53.3	+7.2
Labour	G. Sharpe	1,576	31.8	−4.5
Conservative	V. Colledge	621	12.5	−5.1
Green	C. Shearman	116	2.3	+2.3
Majority		1,061	21.4	+11.7
Turnout		4,950		
Liberal hold		Swing	+5.8	

=== Lightbowne ===
Lightbowne
Party	Candidate	Votes	%	±%
Labour	K. Franklin	2,842	63.1	+7.1
Conservative	J. Bailey	1,040	23.1	−10.7
Liberal	D. Porter	620	13.8	+3.6
Majority		1,802	40.0	+17.8
Turnout		4,502		
Labour hold		Swing	+8.9	

=== Longsight ===
Longsight
Party	Candidate	Votes	%	±%
Labour	N. Moghal	2,406	63.4	−0.8
SDP	D. Cox	822	21.7	+1.8
Conservative	M. Khan	430	11.3	−2.9
Green	J. McCahon	135	3.6	+3.6
Majority		1,584	41.8	−2.5
Turnout		3,793		
Labour hold		Swing	-1.3	

=== Moss Side ===
Moss Side
Party	Candidate	Votes	%	±%
Labour	G. Ballance	2,675	80.6	+2.2
Conservative	M. Barnes	342	10.3	−3.7
Liberal	S. Jones	302	9.1	+1.6
Majority		2,333	70.3	+5.9
Turnout		3,319		
Labour hold		Swing	+2.9	

=== Moston ===
Moston
Party	Candidate	Votes	%	±%
Labour	C. McLaren*	2,584	56.1	+2.5
Conservative	F. Taylor	1,172	25.4	−10.6
Liberal	D. Gordon	471	10.2	+0.2
Majority		1,412	30.6	+13.0
Turnout		4,608		
Labour hold		Swing	+6.5	

=== Newton Heath ===
Newton Heath
Party	Candidate	Votes	%	±%
Labour	C. Tomlinson*	2,249	73.7	+0.3
Conservative	G. Heathcote	545	17.9	+0.8
Liberal	D. Rea	204	6.7	+0.2
National Front	A. Coles	52	1.7	−1.3
Majority		1,704	55.9	−0.3
Turnout		3,050		
Labour hold		Swing	-0.2	

=== Northenden ===
Northenden
Party	Candidate	Votes	%	±%
Labour	K. Barnes*	2,716	59.3	+4.7
Conservative	M. Logan	1,223	26.7	−9.2
Liberal	J. Hargreaves	641	14.0	+4.4
Majority		1,493	32.6	+13.9
Turnout		4,580		
Labour hold		Swing	+6.9	

=== Old Moat ===
Old Moat
Party	Candidate	Votes	%	±%
Labour	A. Fender	2,790	51.0	−1.6
Liberal	A. Monkhouse	1,276	23.3	+10.5
Conservative	W. Aikman*	1,222	22.3	−12.3
Green	C. Kirby	181	3.3	+3.3
Majority		1,514	27.7	+9.7
Turnout		5,469		
Labour gain from Conservative		Swing	-6.0	

=== Rusholme ===
Rusholme (2 vacancies)
Party	Candidate	Votes	%	±%
Labour	J. Byrne	2,137	47.1	−1.0
Labour	S. Mambu	1,946		
Liberal	Z. Gazdecki	1,840	40.5	+6.0
Liberal	M. Ramsbottom	1,815		
Conservative	N. Barnes	474	10.4	−5.1
Conservative	G. Taylor	419		
Communist	P. Singh	86	1.9	+1.9
Majority		106	6.6	−7.0
Turnout		4,537		
Labour hold		Swing		
Labour hold		Swing	-3.5	

=== Sharston ===
Sharston
Party	Candidate	Votes	%	±%
Labour	Ken Collis*	2,298	64.5	+11.5
SDP	R. Bowers	1,263	35.5	+21.2
Majority		1,035	29.1	+8.7
Turnout		3,561		
Labour hold		Swing	-4.8	

=== Whalley Range ===
Whalley Range
Party	Candidate	Votes	%	±%
Labour	J. Morris	2,310	49.7	+7.9
Conservative	L. Whetton	1,563	33.6	−8.8
SDP	K. McKeon	779	16.7	+0.9
Majority		747	16.1	+15.4
Turnout		4,652		
Labour gain from Conservative		Swing	+8.3	

=== Withington ===
Withington
Party	Candidate	Votes	%	±%
Liberal	A. Jones*	2,240	42.6	+6.3
Labour	K. Matthews	1,834	34.9	+0.4
Conservative	J. Jacobs	1,024	19.5	−9.8
Green	G. Otten	156	3.0	+3.0
Majority		406	7.7	+5.9
Turnout		5,254		
Liberal hold		Swing	+2.9	

=== Woodhouse Park ===
Woodhouse Park
Party	Candidate	Votes	%	±%
Labour	E. Bullows	1,973	55.8	−16.9
Independent	D. Wraxall	728	20.6	+20.6
SDP	E. Bowers	540	15.3	+5.5
Conservative	P. Champion	293	8.3	−9.3
Majority		1,245	35.2	−19.9
Turnout		3,534		
Labour hold		Swing	-18.7	
