= 1963 Manchester City Council election =

UK local government election

- 9 May 1963

38 of 152 seats to Manchester City Council 77 seats needed for a majority
	First party	Second party	Third party
Party	Labour	Conservative	Liberal
Last election	22 seats, 42.8%	11 seats, 34.2%	4 seats, 19.6%
Seats before	79	64	9
Seats won	26	11	1
Seats after	89	54	9
Seat change	▲10	▼10	Steady
Popular vote	77,772	50,680	32,331
Percentage	47.5%	30.9%	19.7%
Swing	▲4.7%	▼3.3%	▲0.1%
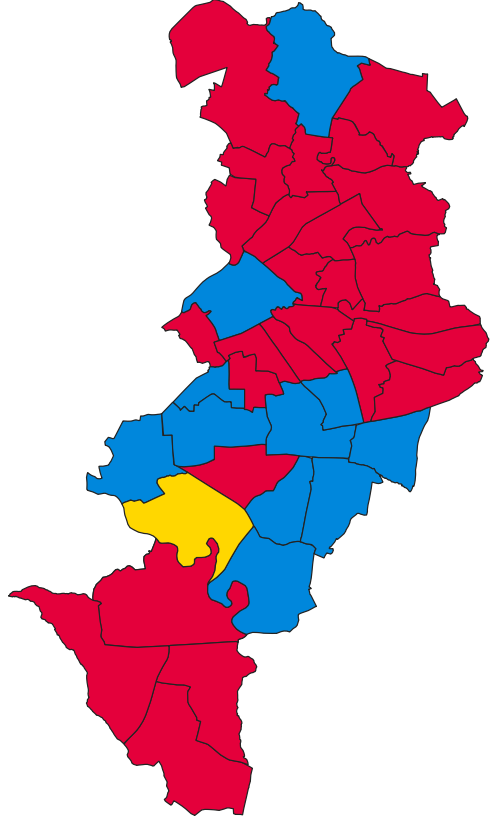
- Map of results of 1963 election
Leader of the Council before election
Labour
Leader of the Council after election
Labour

Elections to Manchester City Council were held on Thursday, 9 May 1963. One third of the councillors seats were up for election, with each successful candidate to serve a three-year term of office. The Labour Party retained overall control of the council.

== Election result ==
Party	Votes		Seats			Full Council	
Labour Party	77,772 (47.5%)	▲4.7	26 (68.4%)	26 / 38	▲10	89 (58.6%)	89 / 152
Conservative Party	50,680 (30.9%)	▼3.3	11 (28.9%)	11 / 38	▼10	54 (35.5%)	54 / 152
Liberal Party	32,331 (19.7%)	▲0.1	1 (2.6%)	1 / 38	Steady	9 (5.9%)	9 / 152
Communist	1,232 (0.8%)	▲0.2	0 (0.0%)	0 / 38	Steady	0 (0.0%)	0 / 152
Ratepayers	890 (0.5%)	▼1.1	0 (0.0%)	0 / 38	Steady	0 (0.0%)	0 / 152
Independent	619 (0.4%)	N/A	0 (0.0%)	0 / 38	N/A	0 (0.0%)	0 / 152
Union Movement	281 (0.2%)	▼1.0	0 (0.0%)	0 / 38	Steady	0 (0.0%)	0 / 152

=== Full council ===
↓
89	9	54

=== Aldermen ===
↓
19	2	17

=== Councillors ===
↓
70	7	37

== Ward results ==
=== Alexandra Park ===
Alexandra Park
Party	Candidate	Votes	%	±%
Conservative	N. Thompson*	3,094	50.6	+7.9
Liberal	A. Whiteland	2,122	34.7	−9.4
Labour	T. Richardson	817	13.4	+5.3
Union Movement	R. J. Marsden	83	1.4	−1.0
Majority		972	15.9	
Turnout		6,116		
Conservative hold		Swing		

=== All Saints' ===
All Saints'
Party	Candidate	Votes	%	±%
Labour	F. Hatton*	1,754	82.0	+8.0
Conservative	R. W. Phillips	386	18.0	−1.5
Majority		1,368	64.0	+9.5
Turnout		2,140		
Labour hold		Swing		

=== Ardwick ===
Ardwick
Party	Candidate	Votes	%	±%
Labour	F. Taylor*	1,851	79.3	+9.4
Conservative	W. Ricketts	482	20.7	−9.4
Majority		1,369	58.6	+18.8
Turnout		2,333		
Labour hold		Swing		

=== Baguley ===
Baguley
Party	Candidate	Votes	%	±%
Labour	R. A. Reddington	3,559	52.4	+4.2
Conservative	C. Sanders*	2,128	31.4	−0.2
Liberal	G. A. Ruscoe	1,096	16.2	−4.0
Majority		1,431	21.1	+4.5
Turnout		6,783		
Labour gain from Conservative		Swing		

=== Barlow Moor ===
Barlow Moor
Party	Candidate	Votes	%	±%
Liberal	D. Cunvin	1,724	45.2	+2.0
Conservative	A. Hooley	1,263	33.1	+2.0
Labour	G. Hayward	831	21.7	+5.4
Majority		461	12.1	0
Turnout		3,818		
Liberal gain from Conservative		Swing		

=== Benchill ===
Benchill
Party	Candidate	Votes	%	±%
Labour	J. Hussey	3,445	52.6	+0.8
Conservative	A. Williamson*	1,974	30.1	+0.5
Liberal	J. Glithero	1,023	15.6	−0.7
Communist	M. Taylor	110	1.7	−0.6
Majority		1,471	22.5	+0.4
Turnout		6,552		
Labour gain from Conservative		Swing		

=== Beswick ===
Beswick
Party	Candidate	Votes	%	±%
Labour	K. Eastham*	2,613	86.7	+2.7
Independent	D. S. Lawson	208	6.9	N/A
Conservative	S. Mottram	193	6.4	−3.1
Majority		2,405	79.8	+5.3
Turnout		3,014		
Labour hold		Swing		

=== Blackley ===
Blackley
Party	Candidate	Votes	%	±%
Conservative	E. D. Kirkup*	2,327	40.4	−2.1
Labour	S. N. M. Moxley	2,112	36.7	+6.8
Liberal	W. Wren	1,314	22.8	−2.7
Majority		215	3.7	−8.9
Turnout		5,753		
Conservative hold		Swing		

=== Bradford ===
Bradford
Party	Candidate	Votes	%	±%
Labour	J. Taylor*	3,011	75.3	+2.2
Conservative	M. R. Chandler	859	21.5	−5.4
Communist	S. Cole	129	3.2	N/A
Majority		2,152	53.8	+7.6
Turnout		3,999		
Labour hold		Swing		

=== Burnage ===
Burnage
Party	Candidate	Votes	%	±%
Conservative	D. J. Edwards*	2,270	37.4	−1.4
Liberal	A. T. Parkinson	1,925	31.7	−5.9
Labour	C. W. Drew	1,879	30.9	+7.3
Majority		345	5.7	+4.5
Turnout		6,074		
Conservative hold		Swing		

=== Cheetham ===
Cheetham
Party	Candidate	Votes	%	±%
Labour	B. Lawson	1,695	48.7	−0.2
Liberal	S. Needoff*	1,363	39.2	−5.4
Conservative	L. Black	423	12.1	+6.9
Majority		332	9.5	+5.2
Turnout		3,481		
Labour gain from Liberal		Swing		

=== Chorlton-cum-Hardy ===
Chorlton-cum-Hardy
Party	Candidate	Votes	%	±%
Conservative	S. Ralphs*	2,422	38.4	−6.2
Liberal	M. Cheers	1,966	31.2	−4.2
Labour	H. P. D. Paget	1,263	20.1	+7.3
Ratepayers	T. Johnson	648	10.3	+3.6
Majority		456	7.2	−2.0
Turnout		6,299		
Conservative hold		Swing		

=== Collegiate Church ===
Collegiate Church
Party	Candidate	Votes	%	±%
Labour	S. A. Ogden	1,490	79.7	+2.4
Conservative	S. Black	241	12.9	+1.1
Communist	K. Bloch	139	7.4	0
Majority		1,249	66.8	+1.3
Turnout		1,870		
Labour hold		Swing		

=== Crumpsall ===
Crumpsall
Party	Candidate	Votes	%	±%
Labour	A. Zolkwer	3,312	40.9	+5.7
Conservative	E. Mawdsley*	2,780	34.4	−1.4
Liberal	A. F. Sullivan	2,000	24.7	−4.3
Majority		532	6.5	
Turnout		8,092		
Labour gain from Conservative		Swing		

=== Didsbury ===
Didsbury
Party	Candidate	Votes	%	±%
Conservative	N. Coe*	2,948	49.3	+1.1
Liberal	T. MacInerney	2,161	36.2	−6.4
Labour	P. J. Donoghue	867	14.5	+5.4
Majority		787	13.1	+7.5
Turnout		5,976		
Conservative hold		Swing		

=== Gorton North ===
Gorton North
Party	Candidate	Votes	%	±%
Labour	P. Roddy*	3,605	92.0	+18.9
Communist	J. Whitwell	315	8.0	N/A
Majority		3,290	84.0	+37.8
Turnout		3,920		
Labour hold		Swing		

=== Gorton South ===
Gorton South
Party	Candidate	Votes	%	±%
Labour	D. Barker*	2,011	66.8	+3.2
Liberal	W. M. Drape	999	33.2	N/A
Majority		1,012	33.6	+6.4
Turnout		3,010		
Labour hold		Swing		

=== Harpurhey ===
Harpurhey
Party	Candidate	Votes	%	±%
Labour	A. O'Toole*	2,348	67.5	+2.9
Conservative	J. Egan	1,130	32.5	−0.9
Majority		1,218	35.0	+3.8
Turnout		3,478		
Labour hold		Swing		

=== Hugh Oldham ===
Hugh Oldham
Party	Candidate	Votes	%	±%
Labour	S. Humphries*	1,481	86.6	+8.4
Conservative	J. D. Cheetham	230	13.4	+0.1
Majority		1,251	73.2	+8.3
Turnout		1,711		
Labour hold		Swing		

=== Levenshulme ===
Levenshulme
Party	Candidate	Votes	%	±%
Conservative	O. Lodge*	2,347	44.2	+6.0
Labour	R. Hardisty	2,101	39.6	+15.5
Liberal	S. W. Chinn	863	16.2	−2.4
Majority		246	4.6	−9.5
Turnout		5,311		
Conservative hold		Swing		

=== Lightbowne ===
Lightbowne
Party	Candidate	Votes	%	±%
Labour	L. Kelly	2,648	42.5	+7.4
Conservative	A. Tetlow*	2,070	33.3	−5.3
Liberal	H. Roche	1,507	24.2	+1.5
Majority		578	9.2	
Turnout		6,225		
Labour gain from Conservative		Swing		

=== Longsight ===
Longsight
Party	Candidate	Votes	%	±%
Conservative	F. J. Dunn*	1,753	47.8	−9.5
Labour	J. Davis	1,421	38.8	+2.8
Liberal	C. E. Harfield	380	10.4	N/A
Communist	H. Johnson	93	2.5	−1.7
Union Movement	B. Keeling	19	0.5	−2.0
Majority		332	9.0	−12.3
Turnout		3,666		
Conservative hold		Swing		

=== Miles Platting ===
Miles Platting
Party	Candidate	Votes	%	±%
Labour	E. V. Hughes*	1,780	69.3	+3.7
Conservative	J. H. Tresman	788	30.7	−1.1
Majority		992	38.6	+4.8
Turnout		2,568		
Labour hold		Swing		

=== Moss Side East ===
Moss Side East
Party	Candidate	Votes	%	±%
Labour	A. J. Bateman	1,889	51.7	+4.7
Conservative	J. Lang*	1,391	38.1	−4.6
Liberal	J. B. Delafallie	371	10.2	N/A
Majority		498	13.6	+9.3
Turnout		3,651		
Labour gain from Conservative		Swing		

=== Moss Side West ===
Moss Side West
Party	Candidate	Votes	%	±%
Conservative	A. H. Burlin	1,785	40.5	−2.4
Labour	R. E. Talbot	1,446	32.8	+3.4
Liberal	M. McCann	824	18.7	−6.8
Ratepayers	G. J. Playford	242	5.5	N/A
Communist	E. Foster	83	1.9	N/A
Union Movement	G. S. Gee	24	0.6	−1.6
Majority		339	7.7	−5.8
Turnout		4,404		
Conservative hold		Swing		

=== Moston ===
Moston
Party	Candidate	Votes	%	±%
Labour	W. R. Barber	3,700	50.8	+4.5
Conservative	P. Collins	1,927	26.4	−6.7
Liberal	J. Bulmer	1,252	17.2	−3.4
Independent	K. E. Goulding	411	5.6	N/A
Majority		1,773	24.4	+11.2
Turnout		7,290		
Labour gain from Conservative		Swing		

=== New Cross ===
New Cross
Party	Candidate	Votes	%	±%
Labour	E. Crank*	1,245	82.2	+1.3
Conservative	C. J. Catarall	270	17.8	+4.5
Majority		975	64.4	−3.3
Turnout		1,515		
Labour hold		Swing		

=== Newton Heath ===
Newton Heath
Party	Candidate	Votes	%	±%
Labour	T. C. Jones	2,111	51.7	−14.4
Liberal	R. Jackson	986	24.1	N/A
Conservative	E. A. Walmsley	890	21.8	−9.1
Communist	J. B. Cross	100	2.4	N/A
Majority		1,125	27.6	−7.6
Turnout		4,087		
Labour hold		Swing		

=== Northenden ===
Northenden
Party	Candidate	Votes	%	±%
Labour	F. Firth	3,213	39.5	+4.9
Liberal	R. H. Hargreaves	2,685	33.0	−1.0
Conservative	H. Tucker*	2,240	27.5	−3.9
Majority		528	6.5	+6.0
Turnout		8,138		
Labour gain from Conservative		Swing		

=== Old Moat ===
Old Moat
Party	Candidate	Votes	%	±%
Labour	R. B. Davies	1,363	33.9	+12.3
Liberal	A. Yates	1,353	33.6	−8.3
Conservative	H. Boff*	1,305	32.5	−4.0
Majority		10	0.3	
Turnout		4,021		
Labour gain from Conservative		Swing		

=== Openshaw ===
Openshaw
Party	Candidate	Votes	%	±%
Labour	S. Jolly*	3,003	76.6	+4.0
Conservative	H. Woodman	793	20.2	−2.7
Communist	H. Holland	123	3.2	0
Majority		2,210	56.4	+6.7
Turnout		3,919		
Labour hold		Swing		

=== Rusholme ===
Rusholme
Party	Candidate	Votes	%	±%
Conservative	F. W. Harrison*	1,981	47.4	+0.5
Labour	J. Broderick	1,189	28.4	+6.2
Liberal	F. N. Wedlock	1,012	24.2	−2.4
Majority		792	19.0	−1.3
Turnout		4,182		
Conservative hold		Swing		

=== St. George's ===
St. George's
Party	Candidate	Votes	%	±%
Labour	K. Collis*	1,924	78.8	+6.9
Conservative	N. P. Delayen	518	21.2	−2.2
Majority		1,406	57.6	+9.1
Turnout		2,442		
Labour hold		Swing		

=== St. Luke's ===
St. Luke's
Party	Candidate	Votes	%	±%
Labour	D. A. Warby	1,831	63.1	−0.6
Conservative	W. Crabtree*	1,072	36.9	+3.9
Majority		759	26.2	−4.5
Turnout		2,903		
Labour gain from Conservative		Swing		

=== St. Mark's ===
St. Mark's
Party	Candidate	Votes	%	±%
Labour	B. Conlan*	2,342	75.4	+5.6
Conservative	I. Goslin	609	19.6	−10.6
Union Movement	R. G. Quinn	155	5.0	N/A
Majority		1,733	55.8	+16.2
Turnout		3,106		
Labour hold		Swing		

=== St. Peter's ===
St. Peter's
Party	Candidate	Votes	%	±%
Conservative	N. Beer*	1,026	74.6	+24.6
Labour	J. T. Morgan	350	25.4	−6.5
Majority		676	49.2	+31.1
Turnout		1,376		
Conservative hold		Swing		

=== Withington ===
Withington
Party	Candidate	Votes	%	±%
Conservative	E. R. Coker*	2,219	42.4	−0.8
Liberal	A. Angel	2,145	41.0	−6.2
Labour	C. Creveul	866	16.6	+7.0
Majority		74	1.4	
Turnout		5,230		
Conservative hold		Swing		

=== Woodhouse Park ===
Woodhouse Park
Party	Candidate	Votes	%	±%
Labour	C. H. Hall*	3,406	63.6	−11.9
Liberal	K. Hamnett	1,260	23.5	N/A
Conservative	R. M. Shaw	546	10.2	−9.8
Communist	E. Holt	140	2.7	−1.8
Majority		2,146	40.1	−15.4
Turnout		5,352		
Labour hold		Swing		

== Aldermanic elections ==
=== Aldermanic election, 31 July 1963 ===
Caused by the death on 19 July 1963 of Alderman Ernest Kirkman (Labour, elected as an alderman by the council on 5 September 1962).

In his place, Councillor Bernard Langton (Labour, Collegiate Church, elected 1 November 1945) was elected as an alderman by the council on 31 July 1963.

Party	Alderman	Ward	Term expires
Labour	Bernard Langton	Rusholme	1967

=== Aldermanic elections, 2 October 1963 ===
Caused by the death on 29 August 1963 of Alderman J. E. Fitzsimons (Conservative, elected as an alderman by the council on 3 January 1951).

In his place, Councillor Lily Thomas (Labour, Openshaw, elected 6 December 1945) was elected as an alderman by the council on 2 October 1963.

Party	Alderman	Ward	Term expires
Labour	Lily Thomas	Lightbowne	1964

Caused by the death on 1 September 1963 of Alderman Ellis Green (Conservative, elected as an alderman by the council on 2 October 1940).

In his place, Councillor William Murray (Labour, New Cross, elected 1 November 1946) was elected as an alderman by the council on 2 October 1963.

Party	Alderman	Ward	Term expires
Labour	William Murray	Old Moat	1964

=== Aldermanic election, 6 November 1963 ===
Caused by the death on 21 October 1963 of Alderman Herbert Lomax (Conservative, elected as an alderman by the council on 26 July 1950).

In his place, Councillor Maurice Pariser (Labour, Cheetham, elected 1 November 1946) was elected as an alderman by the council on 6 November 1963.

Party	Alderman	Ward	Term expires
Labour	Maurice Pariser	St. George's	1967

=== Aldermanic election, 8 January 1964 ===
Caused by the resignation on 4 December 1963 of Alderman Prof. Frank Edward Tylecote (Conservative, elected as an alderman by the council on 2 November 1949).

In his place, Councillor Harry Gatley (Labour, Benchill, elected 1 November 1946) was elected as an alderman by the council on 8 January 1964.

Party	Alderman	Ward	Term expires
Labour	Harry Gatley	Harpurhey	1967

=== Aldermanic elections, 5 February 1964 ===
Caused by the resignation on 22 January 1964 of Alderman Wallace White (Conservative, elected as an alderman by the council on 29 May 1961).

In his place, Councillor Nellie Beer (Conservative, St. Peter's, elected 1 November 1947; previously 1937-46) was elected as an alderman by the council on 5 February 1964.

Party	Alderman	Ward	Term expires
Conservative	Nellie Beer	Didsbury	1967

Caused by the death on 28 January 1964 of Alderman Frank Farrington (Conservative, elected as an alderman by the council on 5 April 1944).

In his place, Councillor James McGrath (Conservative, Withington, elected 28 June 1949; previously 1938-49) was elected as an alderman by the council on 5 February 1964.

Party	Alderman	Ward	Term expires
Conservative	James McGrath	Burnage	1964

== By-elections between 1963 and 1964 ==
=== Collegiate Church, 24 October 1963 ===
Caused by the election as an alderman of Councillor Bernard Langton (Labour, Collegiate Church, elected 1 November 1945) on 31 July 1963, following the death on 19 July 1963 of Alderman Ernest Kirkman (Labour, elected as an alderman by the council on 5 September 1962); and by the resignation of Councillor Eric Mendell (Labour, Collegiate Church, elected 30 January 1947) on 9 September 1963.

Collegiate Church (2 vacancies)
Party	Candidate	Votes	%	±%
Labour	M. Seigleman	1,474	83.2	+3.5
Labour	J. Davis	1,312	74.0	−5.7
Conservative	I. Black	277	15.6	+2.7
Conservative	C. Warburton	252	14.2	+1.3
Communist	K. Bloch	114	6.4	−1.0
Majority		1,035	58.4	−8.4
Turnout		1,772		
Labour hold		Swing		
Labour hold		Swing		

=== By-elections, 7 November 1963 ===
Two by-elections were held on 7 November 1963 to fill vacancies which had arisen in the city council.

==== Bradford ====
Caused by the death of Councillor Thompson Lomas (Labour, Bradford, elected 8 May 1952) on 24 September 1963.

Bradford
Party	Candidate	Votes	%	±%
Labour	R. Massey	1,605	74.1	−1.2
Conservative	M. R. Chandler	478	22.1	+0.6
Communist	S. Cole	83	3.8	+0.6
Majority		1,127	52.0	−1.8
Turnout		2,166		
Labour hold		Swing		

==== Openshaw ====
Caused by the resignation of Councillor Mary Morley (Labour, Openshaw, elected 10 May 1956) on 27 September 1963; and by the election as an alderman of Councillor Lily Thomas (Labour, Openshaw, elected 6 December 1945) on 2 October 1963, following the death on 29 August 1963 of Alderman J. E. Fitzsimons (Conservative, elected as an alderman by the council on 3 January 1951).

Openshaw (2 vacancies)
Party	Candidate	Votes	%	±%
Labour	T. O. Hamnett	2,334	66.9	−9.7
Labour	P. J. Donoghue	2,256	64.7	−11.9
Conservative	E. Eccles	967	27.7	+7.5
Conservative	E. A. M. Walmsley	871	25.0	+4.8
Communist	H. Holland	274	7.9	+4.7
Majority		1,289	37.0	−19.4
Turnout		3,488		
Labour hold		Swing		
Labour hold		Swing		

=== Ardwick, 21 November 1963 ===
Caused by the death of Councillor Violet Wilson (Labour, Ardwick, elected 11 May 1950) on 27 August 1963.

Ardwick
Party	Candidate	Votes	%	±%
Labour	K. J. Hill	1,117	54.1	−25.2
Conservative	J. A. Staton	768	37.2	+16.5
Liberal	D. Armstrong	180	8.7	N/A
Majority		349	16.9	−41.7
Turnout		2,065		
Labour hold		Swing		

=== Cheetham, 12 December 1963 ===
Caused by the election as an alderman of Councillor Maurice Pariser (Labour, Cheetham, elected 1 November 1946) on 6 November 1963, following the death on 21 October 1963 of Alderman Herbert Lomax (Conservative, elected as an alderman by the council on 26 July 1950).

Cheetham
Party	Candidate	Votes	%	±%
Labour	J. Broderick	1,155	45.0	−3.7
Liberal	S. Needoff	1,016	39.6	+0.4
Conservative	I. Black	394	15.4	+3.3
Majority		139	5.4	−4.1
Turnout		2,565		
Labour hold		Swing		

=== Benchill, 5 March 1964 ===
Caused by the election as an alderman of Councillor Harry Gatley (Labour, Benchill, elected 1 November 1946) on 8 January 1964, following the resignation on 4 December 1963 of Alderman Prof. Frank Edward Tylecote (Conservative, elected as an alderman by the council on 2 November 1949).

Benchill
Party	Candidate	Votes	%	±%
Labour	A. Smith	2,143	52.9	+0.3
Conservative	E. A. Walmsley	1,368	33.8	+3.7
Liberal	J. Glithero	393	9.7	−5.9
Communist	G. F. Taylor	145	3.6	+1.9
Majority		775	19.1	−3.4
Turnout		4,049		
Labour hold		Swing		
