= Barlow Moor (ward) =

- Ward
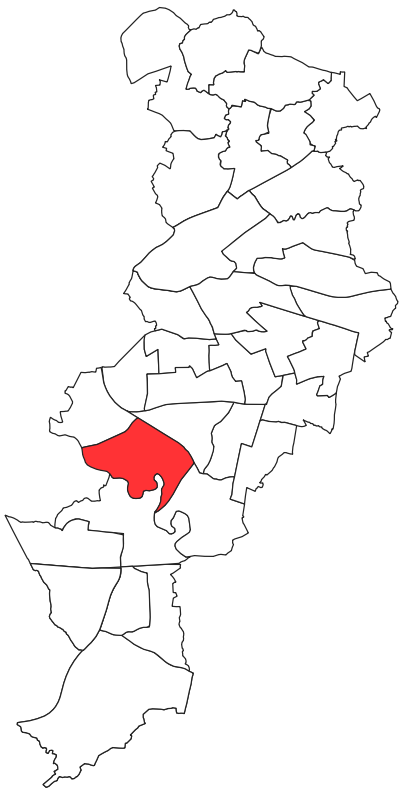
- Barlow Moor ward (1994) within Manchester

- Coat of arms
- Country: United Kingdom
- Constituent country: England
- Region: North West England
- County: Greater Manchester
- Metropolitan borough: Manchester
- Created: May 1950
- Named for: Barlow Moor

Government
  - Type: Unicameral
  - Body: Manchester City Council
- UK Parliamentary Constituency: Manchester Withington

Barlow Moor was an electoral division of Manchester City Council which was represented from 1950 until 2004. It covered the South Manchester suburb of Barlow Moor, as well as parts of Didsbury and Chorlton-cum-Hardy.

== Overview ==
Barlow Moor ward was created in 1950, covering the western portion of the Didsbury ward, which included Barlow Moor. In 1971, the ward underwent minor boundary changes, and was left unchanged by a further city-wide boundary revision in 1982. In 2004, the ward was abolished, and its remaining area was divided between the new Chorlton Park and Didsbury West wards.

From 1950 until 1955, the ward formed part of the Manchester Wythenshawe Parliamentary constituency. From 1955 until its abolition, it was part of the Manchester Withington Parliamentary constituency.

== Councillors ==
Election	Councillor	Councillor	Councillor
1950	H. Harker (Con)	A. Hooley (Con)	W. J. Pegge (Con)
1951	H. Harker (Con)	A. Hooley (Con)	W. J. Pegge (Con)
1952	H. Harker (Con)	A. Hooley (Con)	W. J. Pegge (Con)
1953	H. Harker (Con)	A. Hooley (Con)	W. J. Pegge (Con)
1954	H. Harker (Con)	A. Hooley (Con)	W. J. Pegge (Con)
1955	H. Harker (Con)	A. Hooley (Con)	W. J. Pegge (Con)
1956	H. Harker (Con)	A. Hooley (Con)	W. J. Pegge (Con)
1957	H. Harker (Con)	A. Hooley (Con)	W. J. Pegge (Con)
1958	H. Harker (Con)	A. Hooley (Con)	W. J. Pegge (Con)
1959	H. Harker (Con)	A. Hooley (Con)	W. J. Pegge (Con)
1960	H. Harker (Con)	A. Hooley (Con)	W. J. Pegge (Con)
August 1960	H. Harker (Con)	A. Hooley (Con)	J. P. Cox (Con)
1961	H. Harker (Con)	A. Hooley (Con)	J. Cunningham (Lib)
1962	H. Harker (Con)	P. W. Goldstone (Lib)	J. Cunningham (Lib)
1963	D. Cunvin (Lib)	P. W. Goldstone (Lib)	J. Cunningham (Lib)
1964	D. Cunvin (Lib)	P. W. Goldstone (Lib)	P. Jones (Lib)
1965	D. Cunvin (Lib)	B. Moore (Con)	P. Jones (Lib)
1966	H. Tucker (Con)	B. Moore (Con)	P. Jones (Lib)
1967	H. Tucker (Con)	B. Moore (Con)	C. M. Pugh (Con)
1968	H. Tucker (Con)	B. Moore (Con)	C. M. Pugh (Con)
1969	H. Tucker (Con)	B. Moore (Con)	C. M. Pugh (Con)
1970	H. Tucker (Con)	B. Moore (Con)	C. M. Pugh (Con)
1971	R. Grainger (Lab)	D. A. Parker (Lab)	W. A. Moody (Lab)
1972	R. Grainger (Lab)	D. A. Parker (Lab)	H. Tucker(Con)
1973	H. Tucker (Con)	B. Moore (Con)	N. Wood (Con)
1975	H. Tucker (Con)	B. Moore (Con)	H. D. Moore (Con)
1976	H. Tucker (Con)	B. Moore (Con)	H. D. Moore (Con)
1978	H. Tucker (Con)	B. Moore (Con)	H. D. Moore (Con)
1979	H. Tucker (Con)	B. Moore (Con)	H. D. Moore (Con)
1980	H. Tucker (Con)	J. T. Maguire (Lab)	H. D. Moore (Con)
1982	H. Tucker (Con)	H. D. Moore (Con)	C. Tucker (Lab)
1983	H. Tucker (Con)	H. D. Moore (Con)	C. Tucker (Lab)
1984	H. Tucker (Con)	H. Johnston (Lab)	C. Tucker (Lab)
1986	J. Wilner (Lab)	H. Johnston (Lab)	C. Tucker (Lab)
1987	J. Wilner (Lab)	H. Johnston (Lab)	S. Gluck (SDP)
1988	I. Summers (Lab)	Y. A. Gooljary (Lab)	S. Gluck (SLD)
1990	A. Maloney (Lab)	Y. A. Gooljary (Lab)	S. Gluck (Lib Dem)
1991	A. Maloney (Lab)	Y. A. Gooljary (Lab)	S. Gluck (Lib Dem)
1992	A. Maloney (Lab)	S. Wheale (Lib Dem)	S. Gluck (Lib Dem)
1994	A. Maloney (Lab)	S. Wheale (Lib Dem)	S. Gluck (Lib Dem)
1995	A. Maloney (Lab)	S. Wheale (Lib Dem)	K. Bloch (Lab)
1996	A. Maloney (Lab)	S. Wheale (Lib Dem)	K. Bloch (Lab)
1998	J. Leech (Lib Dem)	S. Wheale (Lib Dem)	K. Bloch (Lab)
1999	J. Leech (Lib Dem)	S. Wheale (Lib Dem)	R. Powell (Lib Dem)
2000	J. Leech (Lib Dem)	S. Wheale (Lib Dem)	R. Powell (Lib Dem)
2002	J. Leech (Lib Dem)	S. Wheale (Lib Dem)	R. Powell (Lib Dem)
2003	J. Leech (Lib Dem)	S. Wheale (Lib Dem)	R. Powell (Lib Dem)

== Elections ==
=== Elections in 1950s ===
==== May 1950 ====
1950
Party	Candidate	Votes	%	±%
Conservative	A. Hooley	2,400	53.0	
Labour	B. Lawson	1,250	27.6	
Liberal	H. Bennett	833	18.4	
Communist	W. Prince	49	2.0	
Majority		1,150	25.4	
Turnout		4,532		
Conservative gain from Labour		Swing		

==== May 1951 ====
1951
Party	Candidate	Votes	%	±%
Conservative	H. Harker*	2,735	70.8	+17.8
Labour	B. J. Overall	1,129	29.2	+1.6
Majority		1,606	41.6	+16.2
Turnout		3,864		
Conservative hold		Swing		

==== May 1952 ====
1952
Party	Candidate	Votes	%	±%
Conservative	W. J. Pegge*	2,570	57.1	−13.7
Labour	F. O'Rourke	1,932	42.9	+13.7
Majority		638	14.2	−27.4
Turnout		4,502		
Conservative hold		Swing		

==== May 1953 ====
1953
Party	Candidate	Votes	%	±%
Conservative	A. Hooley*	2,331	63.3	+6.2
Labour	F. O'Rourke	1,354	36.7	−6.2
Majority		977	26.6	+12.4
Turnout		3,685		
Conservative hold		Swing		

==== May 1954 ====
1954
Party	Candidate	Votes	%	±%
Conservative	H. Harker*	2,386	61.7	−1.6
Labour	E. Mellor	1,479	38.3	+1.6
Majority		907	23.4	−3.2
Turnout		3,868		
Conservative hold		Swing		

==== May 1955 ====
1955
Party	Candidate	Votes	%	±%
Conservative	W. J. Pegge*	2,483	69.7	+8.0
Labour	E. Wood	1,079	30.3	−8.0
Majority		1,404	39.4	+16.0
Turnout		3,562		
Conservative hold		Swing		

==== May 1956 ====
1956
Party	Candidate	Votes	%	±%
Conservative	A. Hooley*	1,574	59.8	−9.9
Labour	E. Wood	1,059	40.2	+9.9
Majority		515	19.6	−19.8
Turnout		2,633		
Conservative hold		Swing		

==== May 1957 ====
1957
Party	Candidate	Votes	%	±%
Conservative	H. Harker*	1,727	57.8	−2.9
Labour	S. E. Tucker	1,263	42.2	+2.0
Majority		464	15.6	−4.0
Turnout		2,990		
Conservative hold		Swing		

==== May 1958 ====
1958
Party	Candidate	Votes	%	±%
Conservative	W. J. Pegge*	1,775	59.2	+1.4
Labour	S. E. Tucker	1,222	40.8	−1.4
Majority		553	18.4	+2.8
Turnout		2,997		
Conservative hold		Swing		

==== May 1959 ====
1959
Party	Candidate	Votes	%	±%
Conservative	A. Hooley*	1,945	64.5	+5.4
Labour	S. E. Tucker	1,070	35.5	−5.3
Majority		875	29.0	+10.6
Turnout		3,015		
Conservative hold		Swing		

=== Elections in 1960s ===
==== May 1960 ====
1960
Party	Candidate	Votes	%	±%
Conservative	H. Harker*	1,533	55.2	−9.3
Liberal	A. Newton	697	25.1	N/A
Labour	P. T. Taylor	545	19.6	−15.9
Majority		836	30.1	+1.1
Turnout		2,775		
Conservative hold		Swing		

==== August 1960 (by-election) ====
By-election: 18 August 1960
Party	Candidate	Votes	%	±%
Conservative	J. P. Cox	1,550	49.7	−5.5
Liberal	J. Cunningham	1,106	35.5	+10.4
Labour	P. Potts	460	14.8	−4.8
Majority		444	14.2	−15.9
Turnout		3,116		
Conservative hold		Swing		

==== May 1961 ====
1961
Party	Candidate	Votes	%	±%
Liberal	J. Cunningham	1,607	42.5	+17.4
Conservative	J. P. Cox*	1,604	42.4	−12.8
Labour	P. Potts	567	15.1	−4.5
Majority		3	0.1	
Turnout		3,778		
Liberal gain from Conservative		Swing		

==== May 1962 ====
1962
Party	Candidate	Votes	%	±%
Liberal	P. W. Goldstone	1,765	43.2	+0.7
Conservative	A. Hooley*	1,272	31.1	−11.3
Labour	J. L. Shelmerdine	668	16.3	+1.2
Ratepayers	T. Johnson	384	9.4	N/A
Majority		493	12.1	+12.0
Turnout		4,089		
Liberal gain from Conservative		Swing		

==== May 1963 ====
1963
Party	Candidate	Votes	%	±%
Liberal	D. Cunvin	1,724	45.2	+2.0
Conservative	A. Hooley	1,263	33.1	+2.0
Labour	G. Hayward	831	21.7	+5.4
Majority		461	12.1	0
Turnout		3,818		
Liberal gain from Conservative		Swing		

==== May 1964 ====
1964
Party	Candidate	Votes	%	±%
Liberal	P. Jones	1,563	41.7	−3.5
Conservative	J. D. Cheetham	1,356	36.1	+3.0
Labour	G. Hayward	831	22.2	+0.5
Majority		207	5.6	−6.5
Turnout		3,750		
Liberal hold		Swing		

==== May 1965 ====
1965
Party	Candidate	Votes	%	±%
Conservative	B. Moore	1,584	43.0	+6.9
Liberal	P. W. Goldstone*	1,468	39.8	−1.9
Labour	K. Roberts	635	17.2	−5.0
Majority		116	3.2	
Turnout		3,687		
Conservative gain from Liberal		Swing		

==== May 1966 ====
1966
Party	Candidate	Votes	%	±%
Conservative	H. Tucker*	1,930	64.4	+21.4
Labour	R. L. Griffiths	1,067	35.6	+18.4
Majority		863	28.8	+25.6
Turnout		2,997		
Conservative gain from Liberal		Swing		

==== May 1967 ====
1967
Party	Candidate	Votes	%	±%
Conservative	C. M. Pugh	1,921	55.9	−8.5
Liberal	P. Jones*	975	28.4	N/A
Labour	R. Barrett	539	15.7	−19.9
Majority		946	27.5	−1.3
Turnout		3,435		
Conservative gain from Liberal		Swing		

==== May 1968 ====
1968
Party	Candidate	Votes	%	±%
Conservative	B. Moore*	1,977	57.9	+2.0
Liberal	R. H. Hargreaves	948	27.8	−0.6
Labour	D. G. Ford	490	14.3	−1.4
Majority		1,029	30.1	+2.6
Turnout		3,415		
Conservative hold		Swing		

==== May 1969 ====
1969
Party	Candidate	Votes	%	±%
Conservative	H. Tucker*	2,049	59.6	+1.7
Liberal	A. J. Markin	789	22.9	−4.9
Labour	W. A. Moody	600	17.5	+3.2
Majority		1,260	36.7	+6.6
Turnout		3,438		
Conservative hold		Swing		

=== Elections in 1970s ===
==== May 1970 ====
1970
Party	Candidate	Votes	%	±%
Conservative	C. M. Pugh*	1,645	47.2	−12.4
Labour	W. A. Moody	988	28.4	+10.9
Liberal	D. V. Jameson	834	23.9	+1.0
Residents	J. Stretton	17	0.5	N/A
Majority		657	18.8	−17.9
Turnout		3,484		
Conservative hold		Swing		

==== May 1971 ====
1971 (3 vacancies; new boundaries)
Party	Candidate	Votes	%	±%
Labour	R. Grainger	1,780	44.8	
Labour	D. A. Parker	1,743	43.9	
Labour	W. A. Moody	1,738	43.8	
Conservative	H. Tucker*	1,653	41.6	
Conservative	B. Moore*	1,594	40.1	
Conservative	N. Wood	1,557	39.2	
Liberal	P. Jones	667	16.8	
Liberal	D. R. Mellor	555	14.0	
Liberal	P. J. Brindle	479	12.1	
Communist	A. J. Hunt	146	3.7	
Majority		85	2.1	
Turnout		3,971		
Labour win (new seat)				
Labour win (new seat)				
Labour win (new seat)				

==== May 1972 ====
1972
Party	Candidate	Votes	%	±%
Conservative	H. Tucker	1,915	49.5	+7.9
Labour	W. A. Moody*	1,460	37.8	−7.0
Liberal	D. R. Mellor	490	12.7	−4.1
Majority		455	11.8	
Turnout		3,865		
Conservative gain from Labour		Swing		

==== May 1973 ====
1973 (3 vacancies; reorganisation)
Party	Candidate	Votes	%	±%
Conservative	H. Tucker*	1,968	60.5	+11.0
Conservative	B. Moore	1,611	49.5	0
Conservative	N. Wood	1,566	48.1	−1.4
Labour	R. Grainger*	1,131	34.7	−3.1
Labour	D. A. Parker*	1,047	32.2	−5.6
Labour	A. J. Bateman*	1,004	30.8	−7.0
Liberal	D. R. Mellor	735	22.6	+9.9
Majority		435	13.4	+1.6
Turnout		3,255		
Conservative hold		Swing		
Conservative gain from Labour		Swing		
Conservative gain from Labour		Swing		

==== May 1975 ====
1975
Party	Candidate	Votes	%	±%
Conservative	H. D. Moore*	2,083	64.4	+13.1
Labour	J. Winer	1,150	35.6	+6.0
Majority		933	28.9	+7.0
Turnout		3,233		
Conservative hold		Swing	+3.5	

==== May 1976 ====
1976
Party	Candidate	Votes	%	±%
Conservative	B. Moore*	2,191	56.2	−8.2
Labour	P. Karney	1,404	36.0	+0.4
Liberal	G. Irvine	301	7.7	+7.7
Majority		787	20.2	−8.7
Turnout		3,896		
Conservative hold		Swing	-4.3	

==== May 1978 ====
1978
Party	Candidate	Votes	%	±%
Conservative	H. Tucker*	2,136	63.9	+7.7
Labour	A. Manning	1,208	36.1	+0.1
Majority		928	27.8	+7.6
Turnout		3,344	32.4	
Conservative hold		Swing	+3.8	

==== May 1979 ====
1979
Party	Candidate	Votes	%	±%
Conservative	H. D. Moore*	3,095	45.9	−18.0
Labour	J. H. Parish	2,834	42.0	+5.9
Liberal	J. R. Marsden	815	12.1	+12.1
Majority		261	3.9	−23.9
Turnout		6,744	68.0	+35.6
Conservative hold		Swing	-11.9	

=== Elections in 1980s ===
==== May 1980 ====
1980
Party	Candidate	Votes	%	±%
Labour	J. T. Maguire	1,835	48.1	+6.1
Conservative	B. Moore*	1,590	41.7	−4.2
Liberal	J. R. Marsden	364	9.5	−2.6
Independent	M. G. Gibson	25	0.7	+0.7
Majority		245	6.4	+2.5
Turnout		3,814	37.2	−30.8
Labour gain from Conservative		Swing	+5.1	

==== May 1982 ====
1982 (3 vacancies; new boundaries)
Party	Candidate	Votes	%	±%
Conservative	Harold Tucker*	1,546	35.6	
Conservative	Henry Moore*	1,533	35.3	
Labour	Christopher Tucker	1,522	35.1	
Labour	Keith Bradley	1,480	34.1	
Labour	Rhona Graham	1,468	33.8	
Conservative	Beryl Moore	1,464	33.8	
SDP	Fred Balcombe*	1,030	23.7	
SDP	Glenna Robson	975	22.5	
SDP	Trevor Thomas*	900	20.8	
Majority		42	1.0	
Turnout		4,337	39.9	
Conservative win (new seat)				
Conservative win (new seat)				
Labour win (new seat)				

==== May 1983 ====
1983
Party	Candidate	Votes	%	±%
Labour	Christopher Tucker*	2,034	45.6	+8.5
Conservative	Beryl Moore	1,702	38.2	+0.5
SDP	Simon Gluck	720	16.2	−9.0
Majority		332	7.5	+6.8
Turnout		4,456		
Labour hold		Swing	+4.0	

==== May 1984 ====
1984
Party	Candidate	Votes	%	±%
Labour	H. Johnston	2,004	46.5	+0.9
Conservative	Henry Moore*	1,503	34.9	−3.3
SDP	Simon Gluck	799	18.6	+2.4
Majority		501	11.6	+4.1
Turnout		4,306		
Labour gain from Conservative		Swing	+2.1	

==== May 1986 ====
1986
Party	Candidate	Votes	%	±%
Labour	J. Wilner	1,955	46.7	+0.2
SDP	S. Gluck	1,334	31.9	+13.3
Conservative	C. Dewsbury	758	18.1	−16.8
Green	B. Candeland	140	3.3	+3.3
Majority		621	14.8	+3.2
Turnout		4,187		
Labour gain from Conservative		Swing	-6.5	

==== May 1987 ====
1987
Party	Candidate	Votes	%	±%
SDP	Simon Gluck	2,305	42.5	+10.6
Labour	Christopher Tucker*	1,886	34.8	−11.9
Conservative	Nicholas Brook	1,110	20.5	+2.4
Green	Brian Candeland	126	2.3	−1.0
Majority		419	7.7	−7.1
Turnout		5,427		
SDP gain from Labour		Swing	+11.2	

==== May 1988 ====
1988 (2 vacancies)
Party	Candidate	Votes	%	±%
Labour	Y. A. Gooljary	1,746	37.3	+2.5
Labour	I. M. Summers	1,594		
SLD	R. S. Harrison	1,309	28.0	−14.5
SLD	H. D. McKay	1,286		
Conservative	N. H. Brook	1,284	27.5	+7.0
Conservative	M. B. Beaugeard	1,229		
Green	B. A. Candeland	334	7.1	+4.8
Majority		285	9.3	+1.6
Turnout		4,673		
Labour hold		Swing		
Labour hold		Swing	+8.5	

=== Elections in 1990s ===
==== May 1990 ====
1990
Party	Candidate	Votes	%	±%
Labour	A. Maloney	1,874	42.3	+5.0
Liberal Democrats	S. D. Wheale	1,573	35.5	+7.5
Conservative	D. A. Clover	701	15.8	−11.7
Green	J. Booty	284	6.4	−0.7
Majority		301	6.8	−2.5
Turnout		4,432		
Labour hold		Swing	-1.2	

==== May 1991 ====
1991
Party	Candidate	Votes	%	±%
Liberal Democrats	S. A. Gluck*	1,799	45.9	+10.4
Labour	A. Harland	1,258	32.1	−10.2
Conservative	J. P. Baldwin	624	15.9	+0.1
Green	H. F. Bramwell	238	6.1	−0.3
Majority		541	13.8	+7.0
Turnout		3,919	38.0	
Liberal Democrats hold		Swing	+10.3	

==== May 1992 ====
1992
Party	Candidate	Votes	%	±%
Liberal Democrats	S. Wheale	1,644	48.5	+2.6
Labour	G. Betney	1,128	33.3	+1.2
Conservative	N. Murphy	489	14.4	−1.5
Green	H. Bramwell	127	3.7	−2.4
Majority		516	15.2	+1.4
Turnout		3,388		
Liberal Democrats gain from Labour		Swing	+0.7	

==== May 1994 ====
1994
Party	Candidate	Votes	%	±%
Labour	A. Maloney*	1,762	48.5	+15.2
Liberal Democrats	R. Harrison	1,394	38.4	−10.1
Conservative	D. Smith	301	8.3	−6.1
Green	R. Goater	174	4.8	+1.1
Majority		368	10.1	−5.1
Turnout		3,631		
Labour hold		Swing	+12.6	

==== May 1995 ====
1995
Party	Candidate	Votes	%	±%
Labour	Kathleen Bloch	1,775	53.6	+5.1
Liberal Democrats	V. Bingham	1,126	34.0	−4.4
Conservative	M. Higginbottom	268	8.1	−0.2
Green	Robin Goater	142	4.3	−0.5
Majority		649	19.6	+9.5
Turnout		3,311		
Labour gain from Liberal Democrats		Swing	+4.7	

==== May 1996 ====
1996
Party	Candidate	Votes	%	±%
Liberal Democrats	Simon Wheale*	1,570	48.5	+14.5
Labour	Valerie Dunn	1,339	41.4	−12.2
Conservative	Bill Moore	229	7.1	−1.0
Green	A. Kulpa	100	3.1	−1.2
Majority		231	7.1	−12.5
Turnout		3,238		
Liberal Democrats hold		Swing	+13.3	

==== May 1998 ====
1998
Party	Candidate	Votes	%	±%
Liberal Democrats	John Leech	1,671	57.8	+9.3
Labour	Jonathan Whitehead	779	26.9	−14.5
Labour	Arthur Maloney*	197	6.8	−34.6
Conservative	Thomas Bumby	178	6.2	−0.9
Socialist Labour	Margaret Manning	68	2.4	+2.4
Majority		892	30.8	+23.7
Turnout		2,893		
Liberal Democrats gain from Labour		Swing	+11.9	

==== May 1999 ====
1999
Party	Candidate	Votes	%	±%
Liberal Democrats	Richard Powell	1,611	55.5	−2.3
Labour	Kathleen Bloch*	1,030	35.5	+1.8
Conservative	Thomas Bumby	159	5.5	−0.7
Green	Brian Candeland	102	3.5	+3.5
Majority		581	20.0	−10.8
Turnout		2,902	26.6	
Liberal Democrats gain from Labour		Swing	-2.0	

=== Elections in 2000s ===
==== May 2000 ====
2000
Party	Candidate	Votes	%	±%
Liberal Democrats	Simon Wheale*	1,258	56.2	+0.7
Labour	Jonathan Whitehead	574	25.7	−9.8
Conservative	Thomas Bumby	271	12.1	+6.6
Green	Brian Candeland	79	3.5	+0.0
Residents	David Aldred	55	2.5	+2.5
Majority		684	30.6	+10.6
Turnout		2,237	21.0	−5.6
Liberal Democrats hold		Swing	+5.2	

==== May 2002 ====
2002
Party	Candidate	Votes	%	±%
Liberal Democrats	John Leech	1,619	61.3	+5.1
Labour	Beth Morgan	689	26.1	+0.4
Green	Robin Goater	182	6.9	+3.4
Conservative	Thomas Bumby	150	5.7	−6.4
Majority		930	35.2	+4.6
Turnout		2,640	24.7	+3.7
Liberal Democrats hold		Swing	+2.3	

==== May 2003 ====
2003
Party	Candidate	Votes	%	±%
Liberal Democrats	Neil Trafford	1,376	59.9	−1.4
Labour	Beth Morgan	621	27.0	+0.9
Conservative	James Sharman	143	6.2	+0.5
Green	John Cummings	80	3.5	−3.4
Socialist Alliance	Claire Aze	77	3.4	+3.4
Majority		755	32.9	−2.3
Turnout		2,297	21.9	−2.8
Liberal Democrats hold		Swing	-1.1	

== See also ==
- Manchester City Council
- Manchester City Council elections
