= 1965 Manchester City Council election =

UK local government election

- 13 May 1965

40 of 152 seats to Manchester City Council 77 seats needed for a majority
	First party	Second party	Third party
Party	Labour	Conservative	Liberal
Last election	27 seats, 47.0%	14 seats, 36.4%	1 seats, 15.5%
Seats before	95	49	8
Seats won	20	20	0
Seats after	90	58	4
Seat change	▼5	▲9	▼4
Popular vote	50,090	70,013	18,317
Percentage	34.2%	47.9%	12.5%
Swing	▼12.8%	▲11.5%	▼3.0%
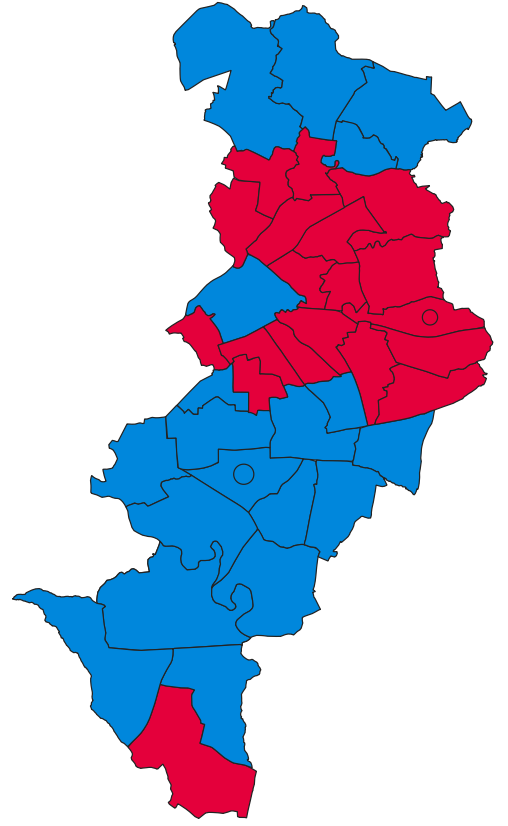
- Map of results of 1965 election
Leader of the Council before election
Labour
Leader of the Council after election
Labour

Elections to Manchester City Council were held on Thursday, 13 May 1965. One third of the councillors seats were up for election, with each successful candidate to serve a three-year term of office. The Labour Party retained overall control of the council.

== Election result ==
Party	Votes	Seats		Full Council			
Labour Party	56,090 (34.2%)	▼12.8	20 (50.0%)	20 / 40	▼5	90 (59.2%)	90 / 152
Conservative Party	70,013 (47.9%)	▲11.5	20 (50.0%)	20 / 40	▲9	58 (38.2%)	58 / 152
Liberal Party	18,317 (12.5%)	▼3.0	0 (0.0%)	0 / 40	▼4	4 (2.5%)	4 / 152
Communist	1,663 (1.1%)	▲0.2	0 (0.0%)	0 / 40	Steady	0 (0.0%)	0 / 152
Independent Labour Party	90 (0.1%)	Steady	0 (0.0%)	0 / 40	Steady	0 (0.0%)	0 / 152
Union Movement	83 (0.1%)	Steady	0 (0.0%)	0 / 40	Steady	0 (0.0%)	0 / 152

=== Full council ===
↓
90	4	58

=== Aldermen ===
↓
23	2	13

=== Councillors ===
↓
67	2	45

== Ward results ==
=== Alexandra Park ===
Alexandra Park
Party	Candidate	Votes	%	±%
Conservative	K. C. Slater	3,242	58.3	+7.1
Liberal	S. Rose	1,520	27.3	−2.0
Labour	A. Flanaghan	797	14.4	−3.4
Majority		1,722	31.0	+9.1
Turnout		5,559		
Conservative gain from Liberal		Swing		

=== All Saints' ===
All Saints'
Party	Candidate	Votes	%	±%
Labour	H. Conway	665	56.1	−17.4
Conservative	P. Clemerson	521	43.9	+17.4
Majority		144	12.2	−34.8
Turnout		1,186		
Labour hold		Swing		

=== Ardwick ===
Ardwick
Party	Candidate	Votes	%	±%
Labour	K. J. Hill*	963	56.1	−10.9
Conservative	J. A. Staton	671	39.1	+6.1
Union Movement	G. S. Gee	83	4.8	N/A
Majority		292	17.0	−17.0
Turnout		1,717		
Labour hold		Swing		

=== Baguley ===
Baguley
Party	Candidate	Votes	%	±%
Conservative	I. K. Paley	2,858	46.2	+9.9
Labour	F. H. Price*	2,655	43.0	−7.0
Liberal	E. Page	667	10.8	−2.9
Majority		203	3.2	
Turnout		6,180		
Conservative gain from Labour		Swing		

=== Barlow Moor ===
Barlow Moor
Party	Candidate	Votes	%	±%
Conservative	B. Moore	1,584	43.0	+6.9
Liberal	P. W. Goldstone*	1,468	39.8	−1.9
Labour	K. Roberts	635	17.2	−5.0
Majority		116	3.2	
Turnout		3,687		
Conservative gain from Liberal		Swing		

=== Benchill ===
Benchill
Party	Candidate	Votes	%	±%
Conservative	B. B. Williams	2,828	49.3	+8.5
Labour	A. A. Smith*	2,399	41.9	−4.8
Liberal	H. Horton	382	6.7	−3.9
Communist	M. Taylor	122	2.1	+0.2
Majority		429	7.4	
Turnout		5,731		
Conservative gain from Labour		Swing		

=== Beswick ===
Beswick
Party	Candidate	Votes	%	±%
Labour	J. G. Birtles*	1,626	74.3	−11.0
Conservative	N. A. Green	562	25.7	+11.0
Majority		1,064	48.6	−22.0
Turnout		2,188		
Labour hold		Swing		

=== Blackley ===
Blackley
Party	Candidate	Votes	%	±%
Conservative	J. A. Lynch*	2,938	52.1	+9.9
Labour	S. Rowe	1,722	30.6	−7.1
Liberal	M. F. Giblin	879	15.6	−3.2
Communist	I. W. Luft	97	1.7	+0.4
Majority		1,216	21.5	+17.0
Turnout		5,636		
Conservative hold		Swing		

=== Bradford ===
Bradford
Party	Candidate	Votes	%	±%
Labour	J. E. Jackson*	1,808	60.2	−11.8
Conservative	R. J. Chronnell	1,068	35.3	+11.9
Communist	S. Cole	137	4.6	0
Majority		748	24.9	−23.7
Turnout		3,005		
Labour hold		Swing		

=== Burnage ===
Burnage
Party	Candidate	Votes	%	±%
Conservative	H. Platt*	2,988	55.1	+8.0
Labour	C. Stewart	1,568	28.9	−2.1
Liberal	W. M Drape	871	16.0	−5.9
Majority		1,420	26.2	+10.1
Turnout		5,427		
Conservative hold		Swing		

=== Cheetham ===
Cheetham
Party	Candidate	Votes	%	±%
Labour	J. Broderick*	1,150	41.5	−5.9
Liberal	S. Needoff	927	33.5	−5.7
Conservative	F. E. Meaden	692	25.0	+11.6
Majority		223	8.0	−0.2
Turnout		2,769		
Labour hold		Swing		

=== Chorlton-cum-Hardy ===
Chorlton-cum-Hardy
Party	Candidate	Votes	%	±%
Conservative	G. W. G. Fitzsimons*	3,526	60.6	+9.5
Liberal	J. Hartley	1,148	19.8	−6.1
Labour	R. F. Delahunty	1,141	19.6	−3.4
Majority		2,378	40.9	+15.7
Turnout		5,815		
Conservative hold		Swing		

=== Collegiate Church ===
Collegiate Church
Party	Candidate	Votes	%	±%
Labour	M. Seigleman*	1,139	77.1	−0.6
Conservative	J. T. Rollins	266	18.0	+3.8
Communist	K. Bloch	72	4.9	−3.2
Majority		873	59.1	−4.4
Turnout		1,477		
Labour hold		Swing		

=== Crumpsall ===
Crumpsall
Party	Candidate	Votes	%	±%
Conservative	F. R. Butler*	3,269	49.0	+13.7
Labour	N. Scholes	2,312	34.7	−12.8
Liberal	A. F. Sullivan	1,086	16.3	−0.9
Majority		957	14.3	
Turnout		6,667		
Conservative hold		Swing		

=== Didsbury ===
Didsbury
Party	Candidate	Votes	%	±%
Conservative	D. Lee*	3,986	74.6	+16.1
Liberal	S. W. Chinn	696	13.0	−14.1
Labour	H. Smith	661	12.4	−2.0
Majority		3,290	61.6	+30.2
Turnout		5,343		
Conservative hold		Swing		

=== Gorton North ===
Gorton North
Party	Candidate	Votes	%	±%
Labour	W. Higgins*	2,055	62.9	−10.6
Conservative	B. Connell	1,085	33.2	+12.6
Communist	J. Skelton	126	3.9	−2.0
Majority		970	29.7	−23.2
Turnout		3,266		
Labour hold		Swing		

=== Gorton South ===
Gorton South
Party	Candidate	Votes	%	±%
Labour	G. Conquest*	1,445	58.5	−11.8
Conservative	H. Holland	1,026	41.5	+11.1
Majority		419	17.0	−7.9
Turnout		2,471		
Labour hold		Swing		

=== Harpurhey ===
Harpurhey
Party	Candidate	Votes	%	±%
Labour	E. Grant*	1,537	51.3	−11.5
Conservative	J. Egan	1,458	48.7	+11.5
Majority		79	2.6	−23.0
Turnout		2,995		
Labour hold		Swing		

=== Hugh Oldham ===
Hugh Oldham
Party	Candidate	Votes	%	±%
Labour	J. B. Ogden*	649	67.1	−14.3
Conservative	K. Allday	272	28.1	+9.5
Communist	E. Cohen	46	4.8	N/A
Majority		377	39.0	−23.8
Turnout		967		
Labour hold		Swing		

=== Levenshulme ===
Levenshulme
Party	Candidate	Votes	%	±%
Conservative	R. A. Fieldhouse*	2,917	60.5	+15.5
Labour	H. N. Ebrey	1,319	27.3	−9.7
Liberal	R. P. Shippen	587	12.2	−5.8
Majority		1,598	33.1	+25.1
Turnout		4,823		
Conservative hold		Swing		

=== Lightbowne ===
Lightbowne
Party	Candidate	Votes	%	±%
Conservative	H. Pigott*	2,654	45.7	+10.2
Labour	P. T. Taylor	1,819	31.3	−14.8
Liberal	H. Roche	1,220	21.0	+2.6
Communist	L. Cole	118	2.0	N/A
Majority		835	14.4	
Turnout		5,811		
Conservative hold		Swing		

=== Longsight ===
Longsight
Party	Candidate	Votes	%	±%
Conservative	H. Sharp*	2,060	66.5	+12.6
Labour	A. Davidson	930	30.0	+1.3
Communist	H. Johnson	110	3.5	−4.0
Majority		1,130	36.5	+11.3
Turnout		3,100		
Conservative hold		Swing		

=== Miles Platting ===
Miles Platting
Party	Candidate	Votes	%	±%
Labour	J. S. Goldstone*	920	52.2	−12.0
Conservative	G. Fildes	793	45.0	+8.5
Communist	B. Panter	51	2.8	N/A
Majority		127	7.2	−19.2
Turnout		1,764		
Labour hold		Swing		

=== Moss Side East ===
Moss Side East
Party	Candidate	Votes	%	±%
Labour	W. A. Downward*	1,458	47.5	−5.6
Conservative	S. Mottram	1,419	46.2	+6.7
Liberal	M. A. G. Hatton	194	6.3	−1.1
Majority		39	1.3	−11.8
Turnout		3,071		
Labour hold		Swing		

=== Moss Side West ===
Moss Side West
Party	Candidate	Votes	%	±%
Conservative	S. D. Alexander*	1,848	57.9	+10.1
Labour	R. E. Talbot	1,082	33.9	−8.2
Liberal	E. Gray	164	5.1	−2.7
Communist	E. Foster	95	3.1	+0.8
Majority		766	24.0	+18.3
Turnout		3,189		
Conservative hold		Swing		

=== Moston ===
Moston
Party	Candidate	Votes	%	±%
Conservative	R. H. Hine	3,030	51.5	+14.6
Labour	R. Latham*	2,850	48.5	+4.3
Majority		180	3.0	
Turnout		5,880		
Conservative gain from Labour		Swing		

=== New Cross ===
New Cross
Party	Candidate	Votes	%	±%
Labour	E. Donoghue*	845	72.2	−6.1
Conservative	T. E. Murphy	326	27.8	+4.8
Majority		519	44.4	−8.3
Turnout		1,171		
Labour hold		Swing		

=== Newton Heath ===
Newton Heath
Party	Candidate	Votes	%	±%
Labour	C. Tomlinson	1,429	52.9	−12.0
Conservative	K. E. Goulding	1,137	42.1	+23.8
Communist	J. B. Cross	133	5.0	+1.5
Majority		292	10.8	−35.8
Turnout		2,699		
Labour hold		Swing		

=== Northenden ===
Northenden
Party	Candidate	Votes	%	±%
Conservative	T. Mountford	3,177	46.2	+5.2
Labour	R. L. Griffiths*	2,476	35.0	−3.8
Liberal	J. E. Hargreaves	1,226	17.8	−2.4
Majority		701	10.2	+8.0
Turnout		6,879		
Conservative gain from Labour		Swing		

=== Old Moat ===
Old Moat (2 vacancies)
Party	Candidate	Votes	%	±%
Conservative	G. Robinson	2,417	49.4	+12.7
Conservative	D. G. Massey	2,307	47.2	+10.5
Liberal	T. Kay*	1,362	27.9	−0.5
Labour	E. Wood	1,317	26.9	−8.0
Labour	D. Healey	1,307	26.7	−8.2
Liberal	T. A. Maher	1,069	21.9	−6.5
Majority		945	19.3	+17.5
Turnout		4,890		
Conservative gain from Liberal		Swing		
Conservative gain from Labour		Swing		

=== Openshaw ===
Openshaw (2 vacancies)
Party	Candidate	Votes	%	±%
Labour	J. Gilmore	2,175	61.9	−7.1
Labour	T. O. Hamnett*	1,930	54.9	−14.1
Conservative	E. Eccles	1,366	38.9	+11.7
Conservative	J. L. Traynor	1,206	34.3	+7.1
Communist	K. McDonald	176	5.0	+1.2
Communist	H. Holland	172	4.9	+1.1
Majority		564	16.1	−25.7
Turnout		3,513		
Labour hold		Swing		
Labour hold		Swing		

=== Rusholme ===
Rusholme
Party	Candidate	Votes	%	±%
Conservative	K. Ollerenshaw*	2,302	62.1	+12.9
Labour	A. E. Jones	812	21.9	−7.5
Liberal	M. D. Howard	594	16.0	−5.4
Majority		1,490	40.2	+20.4
Turnout		3,708		
Conservative hold		Swing		

=== St. George's ===
St. George's
Party	Candidate	Votes	%	±%
Labour	G. Mann*	646	63.2	−17.2
Conservative	A. V. Cookson	376	36.8	+17.2
Majority		270	26.4	−34.4
Turnout		1,022		
Labour hold		Swing		

=== St. Luke's ===
St. Luke's
Party	Candidate	Votes	%	±%
Labour	W. Massey*	1,164	64.4	−4.2
Conservative	M. A. Vince	520	28.8	−2.6
Communist	W. Cross	124	6.8	N/A
Majority		644	35.6	−1.6
Turnout		1,808		
Labour hold		Swing		

=== St. Mark's ===
St. Mark's
Party	Candidate	Votes	%	±%
Labour	N. Morris*	1,535	64.1	−12.8
Conservative	I. Goslin	858	35.9	+12.8
Majority		677	28.2	−25.6
Turnout		2,393		
Labour hold		Swing		

=== St. Peter's ===
St. Peter's
Party	Candidate	Votes	%	±%
Conservative	J. Carson*	857	82.1	+1.6
Labour	T. Richardson	187	17.9	−3.3
Majority		670	64.2	+8.5
Turnout		1,044		
Conservative hold		Swing		

=== Withington ===
Withington
Party	Candidate	Votes	%	±%
Conservative	G. W. Young	2,403	48.6	+2.9
Liberal	J. S. Alldridge*	1,975	39.9	−2.5
Labour	H. Barrett	567	11.5	−0.4
Majority		428	8.7	+5.3
Turnout		4,945		
Conservative gain from Liberal		Swing		

=== Woodhouse Park ===
Woodhouse Park
Party	Candidate	Votes	%	±%
Labour	M. J. Taylor	2,395	59.1	−2.6
Conservative	H. A. McIlroy	1,200	29.6	+13.2
Liberal	J. W. Davenport	282	7.0	−10.2
Ind. Labour Party	B. S. Dean	90	2.2	−0.2
Communist	E. Holt	84	2.1	−0.1
Majority		1,195	29.5	−15.0
Turnout		4,051		
Labour hold		Swing		

== Aldermanic elections ==
=== Aldermanic election, 4 August 1965 ===
Caused by the death on 21 July 1965 of Alderman James McGrath (Conservative, elected as an alderman by the council on 5 February 1964).

In his place, Councillor Ottiwell Lodge (Conservative, Levenshulme, elected 9 November 1939) was elected as an alderman by the council on 4 August 1965.

Party	Alderman	Ward	Term expires
Conservative	Ottiwell Lodge	Burnage	1970

=== Aldermanic election, 1 September 1965 ===
Caused by the death on 5 August 1965 of Alderman Douglas Gosling (Conservative, elected as an alderman by the council on 7 December 1949).

In his place, Councillor Harry Sharp (Conservative, Longsight, elected 5 June 1940) was elected as an alderman by the council on 1 September 1965.

Party	Alderman	Ward	Term expires
Conservative	Harry Sharp	Gorton South	1970

=== Aldermanic election, 6 October 1965 ===
Caused by the death on 18 September 1965 of Alderman Albert Barratt (Conservative, elected as an alderman by the council on 1 February 1961).

In his place, Councillor Gladys Lord (Conservative, Burnage, elected 4 March 1942) was elected as an alderman by the council on 6 October 1965.

Party	Alderman	Ward	Term expires
Conservative	Gladys Lord	Newton Heath	1967

=== Aldermanic election, 1 December 1965 ===
Caused by the resignation on 2 November 1965 of Alderman William Phillip Jackson (Conservative, elected as an alderman by the council on 21 February 1940).

In his place, Councillor Harold Stockdale (Conservative, Rusholme, elected 1 November 1945) was elected as an alderman by the council on 1 December 1965.

Party	Alderman	Ward	Term expires
Conservative	Harold Stockdale	Moss Side West	1967

=== Aldermanic election, 4 May 1966 ===
Caused by the resignation on 25 April 1966 of Alderman Eveline Hill (Conservative, elected as an alderman by the council on 4 September 1957).

In her place, Councillor Arnold Fieldhouse (Conservative, Levenshulme, elected 1 November 1946) was elected as an alderman by the council on 4 May 1966.

Party	Alderman	Ward	Term expires
Conservative	Arnold Fieldhouse	Withington	1967

== By-elections between 1965 and 1966 ==
=== By-elections, 24 June 1965 ===
Two by-elections were held on 24 June 1965 to fill vacancies which had arisen in the city council.

==== New Cross ====
Caused by the election as an alderman of Councillor Chris Blackwell (Labour, New Cross, elected 12 May 1949) on 7 April 1965, following the death on 24 February 1965 of Alderman Mary Knight (Labour, elected as an alderman by the council on 15 February 1956).

New Cross
Party	Candidate	Votes	%	±%
Labour	R. Latham	1,306	59.3	−12.9
Conservative	T. E. Murphy	898	40.7	+12.9
Majority		408	18.6	−25.8
Turnout		2,204		
Labour hold		Swing		

==== Chorlton-cum-Hardy ====
Caused by the death of Councillor Stanley Ralphs (Conservative, Chorlton-cum-Hardy, elected 13 May 1954; previously 1949-52) on 26 April 1965.

Chorlton-cum-Hardy
Party	Candidate	Votes	%	±%
Conservative	M. A. Vince	2,371	54.4	−6.2
Liberal	J. Hartley	1,242	28.5	+8.7
Labour	R. F. Delahunty	747	17.1	−2.5
Majority		1,129	25.9	−15.0
Turnout		4,360		
Conservative hold		Swing		

=== Levenshulme, 30 September 1965 ===
Caused by the election as an alderman of Councillor Ottiwell Lodge (Conservative, Levenshulme, elected 9 November 1939) on 4 August 1965, following the death on 21 July 1965 of Alderman James McGrath (Conservative, elected as an alderman by the council on 5 February 1965).

Levenshulme
Party	Candidate	Votes	%	±%
Conservative	C. S. Robb	1,996	55.6	−4.9
Labour	H. N. Ebrey	1,037	28.9	+1.6
Liberal	R. P. Shippen	554	15.5	+3.3
Majority		959	26.7	−6.4
Turnout		3,587		
Conservative hold		Swing		

=== Longsight, 7 October 1965 ===
Caused by the election as an alderman of Councillor Harry Sharp (Conservative, Longsight, elected 5 June 1940) on 1 September 1965, following the death on 5 August 1965 of Alderman Douglas Gosling (Conservative, elected as an alderman by the council on 7 December 1949).

Longsight
Party	Candidate	Votes	%	±%
Conservative	A. Malpas	1,614	64.1	−2.4
Labour	S. V. Shaw	905	35.9	+5.9
Majority		709	28.2	−8.3
Turnout		2,519		
Conservative hold		Swing		

=== Burnage, 11 November 1965 ===
Caused by the election as an alderman of Councillor Gladys Lord (Conservative, Burnage, elected 4 March 1942) on 6 October 1965, following the death on 18 September 1965 of Alderman Albert Barratt (Conservative, elected as an alderman by the council on 1 February 1961).

Burnage
Party	Candidate	Votes	%	±%
Conservative	B. J. Cox	1,938	51.0	−4.1
Labour	C. Stewart	1,287	33.9	+5.0
Liberal	W. M Drape	575	15.1	−0.9
Majority		651	17.1	−9.1
Turnout		3,800		
Conservative hold		Swing		

=== Rusholme, 27 January 1966 ===
Caused by the election as an alderman of Councillor Harold Stockdale (Conservative, Rusholme, elected 1 November 1945) on 1 December 1965, following the resignation on 2 November 1965 of Alderman William Phillip Jackson (Conservative, elected as an alderman by the council on 21 February 1940).

Rusholme
Party	Candidate	Votes	%	±%
Conservative	C. R. Mayoh	1,439	69.9	+7.8
Labour	A. E. Jones	412	20.0	−1.9
Liberal	F. N. Wedlock	207	10.1	−5.9
Majority		1,027	49.9	+9.7
Turnout		2,058		
Conservative hold		Swing		

=== Longsight, 3 February 1966 ===
Caused by the death of Councillor John Hopkins (Conservative, Longsight, elected 31 January 1946) on 21 November 1965.

Longsight
Party	Candidate	Votes	%	±%
Conservative	A. B. Deacy	1,540	61.9	−4.6
Labour	S. V. Shaw	884	35.6	+5.6
Communist	H. Johnson	62	2.5	−1.0
Majority		656	26.3	−10.2
Turnout		2,486		
Conservative hold		Swing		

=== Collegiate Church, 3 March 1966 ===
Caused by the resignation of Councillor Dr. Merton Seigleman (Labour, Collegiate Church, elected 24 October 1963) on 21 January 1966.

Collegiate Church
Party	Candidate	Votes	%	±%
Labour	R. F. Delahunty	940	80.8	+3.7
Conservative	J. E. Doniger	223	19.2	+1.2
Majority		717	61.6	+2.5
Turnout		1,163		
Labour hold		Swing		
