= Peter Goldstone =

British solicitor and judge

Peter Walter Goldstone (1 November 1926 – 2 August 2013) was a British solicitor and judge. Among the first solicitors to be appointed to the bench, in 1980 he became the first solicitor to sit in the High Court.

== Life and career ==
Goldstone was born in Manchester, the son of a jewellery importer. He was educated at the Manchester Grammar School, before volunteering for the Fleet Air Arm during the Second World War. After he was demobilized he attended the University of Manchester.

Unable to afford to join the bar, he joined his brother's firm of solicitors, becoming a partner in 1951. During his time in private practice, he represented five clients in capital cases, none of whom was convicted. Between 1962 and 1965 he was a Liberal member of the Manchester City Council.

Having originally applied to become the Manchester Stipendiary Magistrate, he was instead appointed a Deputy Stipendiary Magistrate at Bow Street Magistrates' Court in London in 1971, the first solicitor from private practice to appointed. The following year, he was among the first group of solicitors to be appointed recorders. In 1978 he was appointed a circuit judge. In 1980, he became the first solicitor to sit in the High Court. Reportedly, his clerk, on learning that he was a solicitor, said "Oh Sir, you're not a Sir".

In 1990 Goldstone was appointed principal judge for civil matters for Uxbridge, Brentford and part of Hertfordshire, and in 1994 he was appointed the designated care judge at Watford County Court. He retired in 1997, but returned to the bench to sit as a deputy circuit judge.

== Family ==
Goldstone married Patricia (Pat) Golding, née Alexander, in 1955; they had one son and two daughters. She later sat as a justice of the peace.
