= Angus John Bateman =

British geneticist (1919–1996)

Angus Bateman
- Born: Angus John Bateman; 1919
- Died: 1996 (aged 76–77)
- Known for: Bateman's principle
- Scientific career
- Fields: Genetics
- Thesis: An investigation into various factors affecting crossing between varieties of crop plants (1946)

Angus John Bateman (1919–1996) was an English geneticist. He is most notable for his 1948 study of evolutionary effects of sexual selection in fruit flies (Drosophila melanogaster) which established Bateman's principle, where in the evolutionary biology of most species, variability in reproductive success, (or reproductive variance), is greater in males than in females.

Bateman was a member of the Communist Party of Great Britain during the Lysenko affair. He was an anti-Lysenkoist within the Party whilst writing in defense of Lysenko for non-Party audiences.

== Career ==
Bateman received his BSc from King's College London in 1940, and later received his Ph.D. and D.Sc. from the same institution. In 1942 he moved to Cyril Darlington's Genetics Department at the John Innes Horticultural Institute in Merton Park. Bateman was an acquaintance of Ronald Fisher and critically discussed the manuscript of his 1948 paper with him.

Bateman later moved to the Paterson Institute in Manchester and worked on mutagenicity.
