= Harold Tucker =

British politician (1930–2015)

Harold Tucker (1930-October 2015) was a British politician who was the Conservative Leader of the Opposition on Manchester City Council from 1973 to 1990 and Lord Mayor of Manchester from 1984 to 1985. He was Conservative Councillor for the Barlow Moor Ward from 1959 to 1990.

Tucker ran against incoming Prime Minister Harold Wilson at the 1964 General election in Huyton, but was defeated and continued to serve as a councillor.

Following his political career he became trustee of Salford University.

== Early life ==
He was born in Willesden Green, London, and joined the Royal Air Force as a young man.

== Lord Mayorship ==
Tucker was elected Lord Mayor with cross party support in May 1984 and during his year in office, he met Queen Elizabeth several times at Buckingham Palace, flew the Concorde, and met world leaders. He was the last Conservative Lord Mayor of Manchester.

== Death ==
Harold Tucker died in October 2015 in London at the age of 85.

The Lord Mayor at the time, Cllr Paul Murphy, paid his tribute "He was very capable and voluble - a 'proper' Tory who wanted what was best for Manchester - even if we very much disagreed politically about how this was to be achieved."

Honorary titles
Preceded by M. J. Taylor	Lord Mayor of Manchester; 1984–1985	Succeeded by Kenneth Strath
