= St. Michael's (Manchester ward) =

- Ward
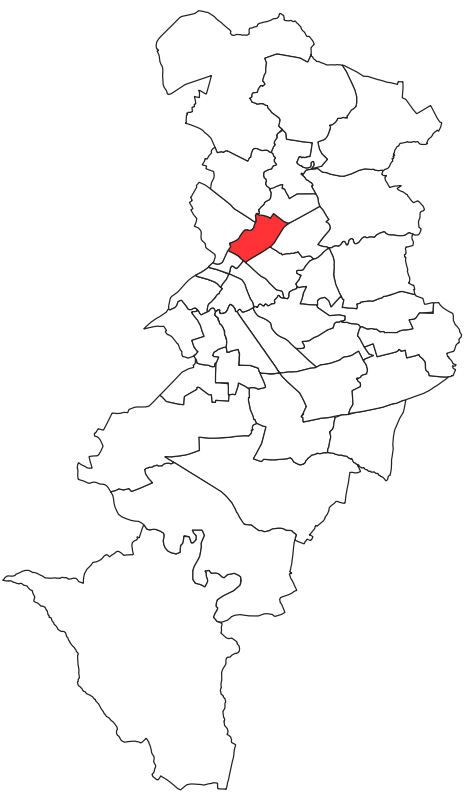
- St. Michael's ward (1931) within Manchester

- Coat of arms
- Country: United Kingdom
- Constituent country: England
- Region: North West England
- County borough: Manchester
- Created: December 1838
- Named for: St. Michael's and All Angels

Government
  - Type: Unicameral
  - Body: Manchester City Council
- UK Parliamentary Constituency: Manchester Cheetham

St. Michael's was an electoral division of Manchester City Council which was represented from 1838 until 1950. It covered an area to the north of Manchester city centre including Newtown and a part of Collyhurst.

== Overview ==
St. Michael's ward was one of the fifteen municipal wards created in 1838, when the Manchester Borough Council was granted a Charter of Incorporation under the provisions of the Municipal Corporations Act 1835.

Initially, the ward's boundaries corresponded with those of District No.2 (St. Michael's) of the Manchester Township, which covered the northernmost part of the township including the areas of Collyhurst and Monsall. Its original boundaries remained in place until 1885, when that part of the ward north of Collyhurst Street was transferred to the new Harpurhey ward. A further boundary revision took place in 1919 which had a relatively minor effect on the boundaries of St. Michael's ward. In 1950, the ward was abolished, and its area became part of the new Newtown ward.

From 1838 until 1885, the ward formed part of the Manchester Parliamentary constituency. From 1885 until 1918, it was part of the Manchester North Parliamentary constituency. From 1918 until 1950, it was split between the Manchester Exchange and Manchester Platting Parliamentary constituencies. It briefly formed part of the Manchester Cheetham Parliamentary constituency from 1950 until its abolition.

== Councillors ==
Election	Councillor	Councillor	Councillor
1838	Richard Cobden (Lib)	John Brooks (Lib)	Thomas Potter (Lib)
May 1839	Joseph Adshead (Lib)	Thomas Molineaux (Lib)	Henry Hilton (Lib)
1839	George Wilson (Lib)	Thomas Molineaux (Lib)	Henry Hilton (Lib)
1840	George Wilson (Lib)	John Kirkham (Lib)	Henry Hilton (Lib)
1841	George Wilson (Lib)	John Kirkham (Lib)	Henry Hilton (Lib)
1842	George Wilson (Lib)	John Kirkham (Lib)	William Holmes (Lib)
1843	George Wilson (Lib)	John Kirkham (Lib)	William Holmes (Lib)
1844	George Wilson (Lib)	John Kirkham (Lib)	William Holmes (Lib)
1845	Charles Ashmore (Con)	John Kirkham (Lib)	Thomas Slater (Con)
(1845–1872)
1872	S. Dyson (Lib)	W. Brown (Lib)	R. T. Walker (Con)
1873	S. Dyson (Lib)	W. Brown (Lib)	R. T. Walker (Con)
1874	G. Moulton (Con)	W. Brown (Lib)	R. T. Walker (Con)
1875	G. Moulton (Con)	W. Brown (Lib)	B. Brierley (Lib)
1876	G. Moulton (Con)	W. Brown (Lib)	B. Brierley (Lib)
1877	G. Moulton (Con)	W. Brown (Lib)	B. Brierley (Lib)
1878	G. Moulton (Con)	W. Brown (Lib)	B. Brierley (Lib)
1879	G. Moulton (Con)	W. Brown (Lib)	B. Brierley (Lib)
1880	G. Moulton (Con)	W. Brown (Lib)	B. Brierley (Lib)
1881	G. Moulton (Con)	W. Brown (Lib)	J. Faulkner (Con)
1882	G. Moulton (Con)	W. Brown (Lib)	J. Faulkner (Con)
1883	G. Moulton (Con)	W. Brown (Lib)	J. Faulkner (Con)
1884	G. Moulton (Con)	W. Brown (Lib)	J. Faulkner (Con)
1885	G. Moulton (Con)	W. Brown (Lib)	J. Faulkner (Con)
November 1885	G. Moulton (Con)	C. O'Neill (Lib)	J. Faulkner (Con)
1886	G. Moulton (Con)	C. O'Neill (Lib)	J. Faulkner (Con)
December 1886	J. Ashworth (Lib)	C. O'Neill (Lib)	J. Faulkner (Con)
1887	J. Ashworth (Lib)	C. O'Neill (Lib)	R. M. Newton (Lib)
1888	J. Ashworth (Lib)	C. O'Neill (Lib)	R. M. Newton (Lib)
1889	D. McCabe (Lib)	C. O'Neill (Lib)	R. M. Newton (Lib)
1890	D. McCabe (Lib)	C. O'Neill (Lib)	J. H. Wells (Lib)
1891	D. McCabe (Lib)	J. McCreesh (Lib)	J. H. Wells (Lib)
1892	D. McCabe (Lib)	J. McCreesh (Lib)	J. H. Wells (Lib)
1893	D. McCabe (Lib)	J. McCreesh (Lib)	J. H. Wells (Lib)
1894	D. McCabe (Lib)	J. Faulkner (Con)	J. H. Wells (Lib)
1895	D. McCabe (Lib)	J. Faulkner (Con)	J. H. Wells (Lib)
1896	D. McCabe (Lib)	J. Faulkner (Con)	J. H. Wells (Lib)
1897	D. McCabe (Lib)	T. Quinn Ruddin (Lib)	J. H. Wells (Lib)
1898	D. McCabe (Lib)	T. Quinn Ruddin (Lib)	J. H. Wells (Lib)
1899	D. McCabe (Lib)	T. Quinn Ruddin (Lib)	J. H. Wells (Lib)
1900	D. McCabe (Lib)	T. Quinn Ruddin (Lib)	J. H. Wells (Lib)
1901	D. McCabe (Lib)	T. Quinn Ruddin (Lib)	J. H. Wells (Lib)
April 1902	A. Hibbert (Con)	T. Quinn Ruddin (Lib)	J. H. Wells (Lib)
1902	A. Hibbert (Con)	T. Quinn Ruddin (Lib)	J. H. Wells (Lib)
1903	A. Hibbert (Con)	T. Quinn Ruddin (Lib)	J. H. Wells (Lib)
1904	A. Hibbert (Con)	T. Quinn Ruddin (Lib)	J. H. Wells (Lib)
1905	A. Hibbert (Con)	T. Quinn Ruddin (Lib)	R. Leah (Con)
1906	A. Hibbert (Con)	T. Quinn Ruddin (Lib)	R. Leah (Con)
1907	A. Hibbert (Con)	T. Quinn Ruddin (Lib)	R. Leah (Con)
1908	A. Hibbert (Con)	T. Quinn Ruddin (Lib)	C. C. Singleton (Con)
1909	A. Hibbert (Con)	T. Quinn Ruddin (Lib)	C. C. Singleton (Con)
1910	A. Hibbert (Con)	T. Quinn Ruddin (Lib)	C. C. Singleton (Con)
November 1910	A. Hibbert (Con)	T. Boyle (Con)	C. C. Singleton (Con)
1911	A. Hibbert (Con)	T. Boyle (Con)	C. Egan (Lib)
1912	A. Hibbert (Con)	T. Boyle (Con)	C. Egan (Lib)
1913	J. Reilly (Lib)	T. Boyle (Con)	C. Egan (Lib)
1914	J. Reilly (Lib)	T. Boyle (Con)	C. Egan (Lib)
1919	J. Reilly (Labour)	T. Ronan (Labour)	C. Egan (Lib)
1920	J. Reilly (Labour)	T. Ronan (Labour)	C. Egan (Lib)
December 1920	J. Reilly (Labour)	T. Ronan (Labour)	T. Cassidy (Labour)
1921	J. Reilly (Labour)	T. Ronan (Labour)	T. Cassidy (Labour)
1922	J. Reilly (Labour)	G. H. Dale (Con)	T. Cassidy (Labour)
1923	J. Reilly (Labour)	G. H. Dale (Con)	T. Cassidy (Labour)
1924	J. Reilly (Labour)	G. H. Dale (Con)	T. Cassidy (Labour)
1925	J. Reilly (Labour)	G. H. Dale (Con)	T. Cassidy (Labour)
1926	J. Reilly (Labour)	G. H. Dale (Con)	T. Cassidy (Labour)
1927	J. Reilly (Labour)	G. H. Dale (Con)	T. Cassidy (Labour)
1928	J. Reilly (Labour)	A. Cathcart (Labour)	T. Cassidy (Labour)
1929	J. Reilly (Labour)	A. Cathcart (Labour)	T. Cassidy (Labour)
September 1930	E. Rafferty (Labour)	A. Cathcart (Labour)	T. Cassidy (Labour)
1930	E. Rafferty (Labour)	A. Cathcart (Labour)	T. Cassidy (Labour)
1931	E. Rafferty (Labour)	A. Cathcart (Labour)	T. Cassidy (Labour)
1932	E. Rafferty (Labour)	A. Cathcart (Labour)	T. Cassidy (Labour)
1933	E. Rafferty (Labour)	A. Cathcart (Labour)	T. Cassidy (Labour)
1933	E. Rafferty (Labour)	A. Cathcart (Labour)	T. Cassidy (Labour)
1935	E. Rafferty (Labour)	A. Cathcart (Labour)	T. Cassidy (Labour)
1936	E. Rafferty (Labour)	A. Cathcart (Labour)	T. Cassidy (Labour)
1937	E. Rafferty (Labour)	A. Cathcart (Labour)	T. Cassidy (Labour)
March 1938	E. Rafferty (Labour)	A. Cathcart (Labour)	J. J. Flynn (Labour)
1938	M. F. Griffin (Labour)	A. Cathcart (Labour)	J. J. Flynn (Labour)
1945	M. F. Griffin (Labour)	A. Cathcart (Labour)	A. Donovan (Labour)
1946	M. F. Griffin (Labour)	W. M. McGuirk (Labour)	A. Donovan (Labour)
1947	M. F. Griffin (Labour)	W. M. McGuirk (Labour)	A. Donovan (Labour)
1949	M. F. Griffin (Labour)	W. M. McGuirk (Labour)	A. Donovan (Labour)

== Elections ==
=== Elections in 1830s ===
==== December 1838 ====
1838 (3 vacancies)
Party	Candidate	Votes	%	±%
Liberal	Richard Cobden	160	100.0	
Liberal	John Brooks	159	99.4	
Liberal	Thomas Potter	159	99.4	
Turnout		160		
Liberal win (new seat)				
Liberal win (new seat)				
Liberal win (new seat)				

==== May 1839 (by-election) ====
By-election: 16 May 1839 (3 vacancies)
Party	Candidate	Votes	%	±%
Liberal	Joseph Adshead	uncontested		
Liberal	Thomas Molineaux	uncontested		
Liberal	Henry Hilton	uncontested		
Liberal hold		Swing		
Liberal hold		Swing		
Liberal hold		Swing		

==== November 1839 ====
1839
Party	Candidate	Votes	%	±%
Liberal	Henry Hilton*	uncontested		
Liberal hold		Swing		

=== Elections in 1840s ===
==== November 1840 ====
1840
Party	Candidate	Votes	%	±%
Liberal	John Kirkham	uncontested		
Liberal hold		Swing		

==== November 1841 ====
1841
Party	Candidate	Votes	%	±%
Liberal	George Wilson	uncontested		
Liberal hold		Swing		

==== November 1842 ====
1842
Party	Candidate	Votes	%	±%
Liberal	William Holmes	uncontested		
Liberal hold		Swing		

==== November 1843 ====
1843
Party	Candidate	Votes	%	±%
Liberal	John Kirkham*	uncontested		
Liberal hold		Swing		

==== November 1844 ====
1844
Party	Candidate	Votes	%	±%
Liberal	George Wilson*	181	51.0	N/A
Conservative	Charles Ashmore	174	49.0	N/A
Majority		7	2.0	N/A
Turnout		355		
Liberal hold		Swing		

==== November 1845 ====
1845
Party	Candidate	Votes	%	±%
Conservative	Thomas Slater	207	63.8	+14.9
Liberal	John Mills	117	36.1	−14.9
Majority		90	27.8	
Turnout		324		
Conservative gain from Liberal		Swing		

=== Elections in 1870s ===
==== November 1872 ====
1872
Party	Candidate	Votes	%	±%
Conservative	R. T. Walker*	2,534	52.2	
Liberal	W. Cliff	2,318	47.8	
Majority		216	4.4	
Turnout		4,852		
Conservative hold		Swing		

==== November 1873 ====
1873
Party	Candidate	Votes	%	±%
Liberal	W. Brown*	2,918	52.9	+5.1
Conservative	G. Moulton	2,407	43.7	−8.5
Independent	J. Barber	114	2.1	N/A
Independent	S. Brown	29	0.5	N/A
Independent	W. T. Brown	23	0.4	N/A
Independent	W. Brown	20	0.4	N/A
Majority		511	9.2	
Turnout		5,511		
Liberal hold		Swing		

==== November 1874 ====
1874
Party	Candidate	Votes	%	±%
Conservative	G. Moulton	2,783	51.3	+7.6
Liberal	J. Jackson	2,646	48.7	−4.2
Majority		137	2.6	
Turnout		5,429		
Conservative gain from Liberal		Swing		

==== November 1875 ====
1875
Party	Candidate	Votes	%	±%
Liberal	B. Brierley	2,817	51.7	+3.0
Conservative	R. T. Walker*	2,628	48.3	−3.0
Majority		189	3.4	
Turnout		5,445		
Liberal gain from Conservative		Swing		

==== November 1876 ====
1876
Party	Candidate	Votes	%	±%
Liberal	W. Brown*	3,079	50.3	−1.4
Conservative	J. Richards	3,038	49.7	+1.4
Majority		41	0.6	−2.8
Turnout		6,117		
Liberal hold		Swing		

==== November 1877 ====
1877
Party	Candidate	Votes	%	±%
Conservative	G. Moulton*	uncontested		
Conservative hold		Swing		

==== November 1878 ====
1878
Party	Candidate	Votes	%	±%
Liberal	B. Brierley*	uncontested		
Liberal hold		Swing		

==== November 1879 ====
1879
Party	Candidate	Votes	%	±%
Liberal	W. Brown*	3,704	51.3	N/A
Conservative	J. Richards	3,512	48.7	N/A
Majority		192	2.6	N/A
Turnout		7,216		
Liberal hold		Swing		

=== Elections in 1880s ===
==== November 1880 ====
1880
Party	Candidate	Votes	%	±%
Conservative	G. Moulton*	uncontested		
Conservative hold		Swing		

==== November 1881 ====
1881
Party	Candidate	Votes	%	±%
Conservative	J. Faulkner	2,372	51.0	N/A
Liberal	B. Brierley*	2,275	49.0	N/A
Majority		97	2.0	N/A
Turnout		4,647		
Conservative gain from Liberal		Swing		

==== November 1882 ====
1882
Party	Candidate	Votes	%	±%
Liberal	W. Brown*	uncontested		
Liberal hold		Swing		

==== November 1883 ====
1883
Party	Candidate	Votes	%	±%
Conservative	G. Moulton*	2,468	52.7	N/A
Liberal	R. Ramsbottom	2,215	47.3	N/A
Majority		253	5.4	N/A
Turnout		4,683		
Conservative hold		Swing		

==== November 1884 ====
1884
Party	Candidate	Votes	%	±%
Conservative	J. Faulkner*	2,373	41.9	−10.8
Liberal	W. Sherratt	1,985	35.1	−12.2
Ind. Nationalist	M. Hasney	1,305	23.0	N/A
Majority		388	6.8	+1.4
Turnout		5,663		
Conservative hold		Swing		

==== November 1885 ====
1885 (new boundaries)
Party	Candidate	Votes	%	±%
Liberal	W. Brown*	1,451	53.2	+18.1
Conservative	R. Walker	1,277	46.8	+4.9
Majority		174	6.4	
Turnout		2,728		
Liberal hold		Swing		

==== November 1885 (by-election) ====
By-election: 17 November 1885
Party	Candidate	Votes	%	±%
Liberal	C. O'Neill	uncontested		
Liberal hold		Swing		

==== November 1886 ====
1886
Party	Candidate	Votes	%	±%
Conservative	G. Moulton*	1,572	51.4	+4.6
Liberal	J. Ashworth	1,471	48.1	−5.1
Independent Liberal	W. Brown	15	0.5	N/A
Majority		101	3.3	
Turnout		3,058		
Conservative hold		Swing		

==== December 1886 (by-election) ====
By-election: 17 December 1886
Party	Candidate	Votes	%	±%
Liberal	J. Ashworth	1,521	55.8	+7.7
Conservative	S. Redfern	1,193	43.8	−7.6
Liberal	W. F. Meaney	12	0.4	−47.7
Majority		328	12.0	
Turnout		2,726		
Liberal gain from Conservative		Swing		

==== November 1887 ====
1887
Party	Candidate	Votes	%	±%
Liberal	R. M. Newton	1,745	56.7	+8.6
Conservative	J. Faulkner*	1,333	43.3	−8.1
Majority		412	13.4	
Turnout		3,078		
Liberal gain from Conservative		Swing		

==== November 1888 ====
1888
Party	Candidate	Votes	%	±%
Liberal	C. O'Neill*	uncontested		
Liberal hold		Swing		

==== November 1889 ====
1889
Party	Candidate	Votes	%	±%
Liberal	D. McCabe	1,650	58.3	N/A
Conservative	J. Lee	1,179	41.7	N/A
Majority		471	16.6	N/A
Turnout		2,829		
Liberal hold		Swing		

=== Elections in 1890s ===
==== November 1890 ====
1890
Party	Candidate	Votes	%	±%
Liberal	J. H. Wells	1,789	53.8	−4.5
Conservative	J. Lee	1,168	35.2	−6.5
Independent Liberal	W. Brown	366	11.0	N/A
Majority		621	18.6	+2.0
Turnout		3,323		
Liberal hold		Swing		

==== November 1891 ====
1891
Party	Candidate	Votes	%	±%
Liberal	J. McCreesh	1,739	52.8	−1.0
Conservative	W. Moulton	1,554	47.2	+12.0
Majority		185	5.6	−13.0
Turnout		3,293		
Liberal hold		Swing		

==== November 1892 ====
1892
Party	Candidate	Votes	%	±%
Liberal	D. McCabe*	1,664	90.2	+37.4
Liberal	H. Lightholder	180	9.8	N/A
Majority		1,484	80.4	+74.8
Turnout		1,844		
Liberal hold		Swing		

==== November 1893 ====
1893
Party	Candidate	Votes	%	±%
Liberal	J. H. Wells*	1,372	91.5	+1.3
Liberal	H. Lightholder	127	8.5	−1.3
Majority		1,245	83.0	+2.6
Turnout		1,499		
Liberal hold		Swing		

==== November 1894 ====
1894
Party	Candidate	Votes	%	±%
Conservative	J. Faulkner	1,246	40.1	N/A
Liberal	T. Quinn Ruddin	1,165	37.4	+28.9
Liberal	J. McCreesh*	605	19.4	−72.1
Independent Liberal	W. Brown	98	3.1	−5.4
Majority		81	2.7	
Turnout		3,114		
Conservative gain from Liberal		Swing		

==== November 1895 ====
1895
Party	Candidate	Votes	%	±%
Liberal	D. McCabe*	1,829	78.2	+58.8
Independent Liberal	W. Brown	509	21.8	+18.7
Majority		1,320	56.4	
Turnout		2,338		
Liberal hold		Swing		

==== November 1896 ====
1896
Party	Candidate	Votes	%	±%
Liberal	J. H. Wells*	uncontested		
Liberal hold		Swing		

==== November 1897 ====
1897
Party	Candidate	Votes	%	±%
Liberal	T. Quinn Ruddin	1,937	63.1	N/A
Conservative	J. Faulkner*	1,132	36.9	N/A
Majority		805	26.2	N/A
Turnout		3,069		
Liberal gain from Conservative		Swing		

==== November 1898 ====
1898
Party	Candidate	Votes	%	±%
Liberal	D. McCabe*	uncontested		
Liberal hold		Swing		

==== November 1899 ====
1899
Party	Candidate	Votes	%	±%
Liberal	J. H. Wells*	uncontested		
Liberal hold		Swing		

=== Elections in 1900s ===
==== November 1900 ====
1900
Party	Candidate	Votes	%	±%
Liberal	T. Quinn Ruddin*	uncontested		
Liberal hold		Swing		

==== November 1901 ====
1901
Party	Candidate	Votes	%	±%
Liberal	D. McCabe*	uncontested		
Liberal hold		Swing		

==== April 1902 (by-election) ====
By-election: 28 April 1902
Party	Candidate	Votes	%	±%
Conservative	A. Hibbert	1,342	52.3	N/A
Liberal	F. J. Farley	1,226	47.7	N/A
Majority		116	4.6	N/A
Turnout		2,568		
Conservative gain from Liberal		Swing		

==== November 1902 ====
1902
Party	Candidate	Votes	%	±%
Liberal	J. H. Wells*	1,425	51.7	N/A
Conservative	S. Williams	1,244	45.1	N/A
Independent	W. Brown	88	3.2	N/A
Majority		181	6.6	N/A
Turnout		2,757		
Liberal hold		Swing		

==== November 1903 ====
1903
Party	Candidate	Votes	%	±%
Liberal	T. Quinn Ruddin*	1,518	54.6	+2.9
Conservative	J. Johnson	1,263	45.4	+0.3
Majority		255	9.2	+2.6
Turnout		2,781		
Liberal hold		Swing		

==== November 1904 ====
1904
Party	Candidate	Votes	%	±%
Conservative	A. Hibbert*	1,517	52.6	+7.2
Irish Nationalist	F. J. Farley	1,369	47.4	N/A
Majority		148	5.2	
Turnout		2,886		
Conservative hold		Swing		

==== November 1905 ====
1905
Party	Candidate	Votes	%	±%
Conservative	R. Leah	1,073	43.1	−9.5
Independent	M. Kinahan	739	29.7	N/A
Liberal	W. May*	677	27.2	N/A
Majority		334	13.4	+8.2
Turnout		2,489		
Conservative gain from Liberal		Swing		

==== November 1906 ====
1906
Party	Candidate	Votes	%	±%
Liberal	T. Quinn Ruddin*	uncontested		
Liberal hold		Swing		

==== November 1907 ====
1907
Party	Candidate	Votes	%	±%
Conservative	A. Hibbert*	1,405	54.4	N/A
Liberal	J. Reilly	1,179	45.6	N/A
Majority		226	8.8	N/A
Turnout		2,584		
Conservative hold		Swing		

==== November 1908 ====
1908
Party	Candidate	Votes	%	±%
Conservative	C. C. Singleton	1,337	56.8	+2.4
Liberal	W. May	1,017	43.2	−2.4
Majority		320	13.6	+4.8
Turnout		2,354		
Conservative hold		Swing		

==== November 1909 ====
1909
Party	Candidate	Votes	%	±%
Liberal	T. Quinn Ruddin*	uncontested		
Liberal hold		Swing		

=== Elections in 1910s ===
==== November 1910 ====
1910
Party	Candidate	Votes	%	±%
Conservative	A. Hibbert*	1,301	56.2	N/A
Liberal	C. Egan	1,016	43.8	N/A
Majority		285	12.4	N/A
Turnout		2,317		
Conservative hold		Swing		

==== November 1910 (by-election) ====
By-election: 25 November 1910
Party	Candidate	Votes	%	±%
Conservative	T. Boyle	1,032	48.7	−7.5
Liberal	C. Egan	1,021	48.2	+4.4
Labour	A. Ogden	67	3.1	N/A
Majority		11	0.5	−11.9
Turnout		2,120		
Conservative gain from Liberal		Swing		

==== November 1911 ====
1911
Party	Candidate	Votes	%	±%
Liberal	C. Egan	1,204	52.7	+8.9
Conservative	C. J. Holland	1,080	47.3	−8.9
Majority		124	5.4	
Turnout		2,284		
Liberal gain from Conservative		Swing		

==== November 1912 ====
1912
Party	Candidate	Votes	%	±%
Conservative	T. Boyle*	1,136	50.3	+3.0
Liberal	J. Reilly	1,124	49.7	−3.0
Majority		12	0.6	
Turnout		2,260		
Conservative hold		Swing		

==== November 1913 ====
1913
Party	Candidate	Votes	%	±%
Liberal	J. Reilly	1,347	52.7	+3.0
Conservative	A. Hibbert*	1,211	47.3	−3.0
Majority		136	5.4	
Turnout		2,558		
Liberal gain from Conservative		Swing		

==== November 1914 ====
1914
Party	Candidate	Votes	%	±%
Liberal	C. Egan*	uncontested		
Liberal hold		Swing		

==== November 1919 ====
1919 (new boundaries)
Party	Candidate	Votes	%	±%
Labour	T. Ronan	1,949	52.8	
Conservative	T. Boyle*	1,741	47.2	
Majority		208	5.6	
Turnout		3,690	57.7	
Labour gain from Conservative		Swing		

=== Elections in 1920s ===
==== November 1920 ====
1920
Party	Candidate	Votes	%	±%
Labour	J. Reilly*	2,541	60.0	+7.2
Conservative	E. Rowland	1,697	40.0	−7.2
Majority		844	20.0	+14.4
Turnout		4,238	66.3	+8.6
Labour hold		Swing		

==== December 1920 (by-election) ====
By-election: 14 December 1920
Party	Candidate	Votes	%	±%
Labour	T. Cassidy	1,769	51.7	−8.3
Conservative	E. Rowland	1,650	48.3	+8.3
Majority		119	3.4	−16.6
Turnout		3,419		
Labour gain from Liberal		Swing		

==== November 1921 ====
1921
Party	Candidate	Votes	%	±%
Labour	T. Cassidy*	2,311	50.4	−9.6
Conservative	G. H. Dale	2,274	49.6	+9.6
Majority		37	0.8	−19.2
Turnout		4,585	74.4	+8.1
Labour hold		Swing		

==== November 1922 ====
1922
Party	Candidate	Votes	%	±%
Conservative	G. H. Dale	2,515	51.0	+1.4
Labour	J. Fogarty	2,300	46.6	−3.8
Independent	A. Walsh	116	2.4	N/A
Majority		215	4.4	
Turnout		4,931	79.0	+4.6
Conservative gain from Labour		Swing		

==== November 1923 ====
1923
Party	Candidate	Votes	%	±%
Labour	J. Reilly*	uncontested		
Labour hold		Swing		

==== November 1924 ====
1924
Party	Candidate	Votes	%	±%
Labour	T. Cassidy*	2,549	57.9	+0.1
Conservative	J. Holland	1,855	42.1	−0.1
Majority		694	15.8	+0.2
Turnout		4,404		
Labour hold		Swing		

==== November 1925 ====
1925
Party	Candidate	Votes	%	±%
Conservative	G. H. Dale*	1,772	39.5	−2.6
Labour	E. Downey	1,747	39.0	−18.9
Independent	J. Hoy	965	21.5	N/A
Majority		25	0.5	
Turnout		4,484	68.3	
Conservative hold		Swing		

==== November 1926 ====
1926
Party	Candidate	Votes	%	±%
Labour	J. Reilly*	2,456	54.3	+15.3
Conservative	W. A. Parker	1,371	30.3	−9.2
Independent Labour	J. Shaw	698	15.4	N/A
Majority		1,085	24.0	
Turnout		4,525	67.4	−0.9
Labour hold		Swing		

==== November 1927 ====
1927
Party	Candidate	Votes	%	±%
Labour	T. Cassidy*	2,366	62.9	+8.6
Conservative	J. Phillips	1,393	37.1	+6.8
Majority		973	25.8	+1.8
Turnout		3,759	43.6	−23.8
Labour hold		Swing		

==== November 1928 ====
1928
Party	Candidate	Votes	%	±%
Labour	A. Cathcart	2,666	60.7	−2.2
Conservative	G. H. Dale*	1,729	39.3	+2.2
Majority		937	21.4	−4.4
Turnout		4,395	65.4	+21.8
Labour gain from Conservative		Swing		

==== November 1929 ====
1929
Party	Candidate	Votes	%	±%
Labour	J. Reilly*	uncontested		
Labour hold		Swing		

=== Elections in 1930s ===
==== September 1930 (by-election) ====
By-election: 8 September 1930
Party	Candidate	Votes	%	±%
Labour	E. Rafferty	uncontested		
Labour hold		Swing		

==== November 1930 ====
1930
Party	Candidate	Votes	%	±%
Labour	T. Cassidy*	uncontested		
Labour hold		Swing		

==== November 1931 ====
1931
Party	Candidate	Votes	%	±%
Labour	A. Cathcart*	2,238	55.6	N/A
Conservative	T. Smith	1,790	44.4	N/A
Majority		448	11.2	N/A
Turnout		4,028	58.3	
Labour hold		Swing		

==== November 1932 ====
1932
Party	Candidate	Votes	%	±%
Labour	E. Rafferty*	2,366	68.9	+13.3
Conservative	T. Smith	1,067	31.1	−13.3
Majority		1,299	37.8	+26.6
Turnout		3,433		
Labour hold		Swing		

==== November 1933 ====
1933
Party	Candidate	Votes	%	±%
Labour	T. Cassidy*	2,071	65.1	−3.8
Conservative	G. C. Clayton	1,112	34.9	+3.8
Majority		959	30.2	−7.6
Turnout		3,183		
Labour hold		Swing		

==== November 1934 ====
1934
Party	Candidate	Votes	%	±%
Labour	A. Cathcart*	1,880	68.6	+3.5
Conservative	G. C. Clayton	859	31.4	−3.5
Majority		1,021	37.2	+7.0
Turnout		2,739		
Labour hold		Swing		

==== November 1935 ====
1935
Party	Candidate	Votes	%	±%
Labour	E. Rafferty*	uncontested		
Labour hold		Swing		

==== November 1936 ====
1936
Party	Candidate	Votes	%	±%
Labour	T. Cassidy*	uncontested		
Labour hold		Swing		

==== November 1937 ====
1937
Party	Candidate	Votes	%	±%
Labour	A. Cathcart*	1,920	62.0	N/A
Conservative	E. Elliott	1,176	38.0	N/A
Majority		744	24.0	N/A
Turnout		3,096		
Labour hold		Swing		

==== March 1938 (by-election) ====
By-election: 3 March 1938
Party	Candidate	Votes	%	±%
Labour	J. J. Flynn	1,385	56.5	N/A
Conservative	E. Elliott	925	37.7	N/A
Residents	A. M. Edwards	142	5.8	N/A
Majority		460	18.8	−5.2
Turnout		2,452		
Labour hold		Swing		

==== November 1938 ====
1938
Party	Candidate	Votes	%	±%
Labour	M. F. Griffin	1,362	46.4	−15.6
Conservative	E. Elliott	1,333	45.4	+7.4
Independent	F. Oates	240	8.2	N/A
Majority		29	1.0	−23.0
Turnout		2,935		
Labour gain from Independent Labour		Swing		

=== Elections in 1940s ===
==== November 1945 ====
1945
Party	Candidate	Votes	%	±%
Labour	A. Donovan*	1,964	78.6	+32.2
Conservative	S. Taylor	536	21.4	−25.0
Majority		1,428	57.2	+56.2
Turnout		2,500		
Labour hold		Swing		

==== November 1946 ====
1946
Party	Candidate	Votes	%	±%
Labour	W. M. McGuirk	1,692	80.0	+1.4
Liberal	L. Cromwell	422	20.0	N/A
Majority		1,270	60.0	+2.8
Turnout		2,114		
Labour hold		Swing		

==== November 1947 ====
1947
Party	Candidate	Votes	%	±%
Labour	M. F. Griffin*	2,667	67.3	−12.7
Conservative	J. Judge	1,295	32.7	N/A
Majority		1,372	34.6	−25.4
Turnout		3,962		
Labour hold		Swing		

==== May 1949 ====
1949
Party	Candidate	Votes	%	±%
Labour	A. Donovan*	2,052	66.4	−0.9
Conservative	S. J. G. Cobb	1,040	33.6	+0.9
Majority		1,012	32.8	−1.8
Turnout		3,092		
Labour hold		Swing		

== See also ==
- Manchester City Council
- Manchester City Council elections
