= 1841 Manchester Borough Council election =

Local election in Manchester

- 1 November 1841

16 of 64 seats to Manchester Borough Council 33 seats needed for a majority
	First party
Party	Liberal
Last election	16 seats, N/A
Seats before	64
Seats won	16
Seats after	64
Seat change	Steady
Popular vote	117
Percentage	92.2%
Swing	N/A
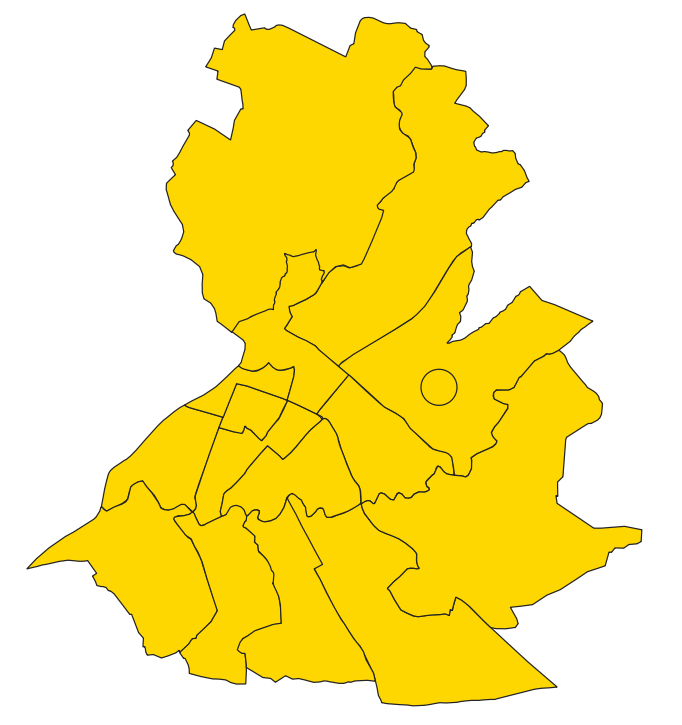
- Map of results of 1841 election
Leader of the Council before election
Liberal
Leader of the Council after election
Liberal

Elections to Manchester Borough Council were held on Monday, 1 November 1841. One third of the councillors seats were up for election, with each successful candidate to serve a three-year term of office. Conservative anti-corporators continued their boycott of municipal elections due to their opposition to Manchester's incorporation. Liberal incorporators retained overall control of the council.

== Election result ==
Party	Votes		Seats			Full Council	
Liberal Party	117 (92.2%)		16 (100.0%)	16 / 16	Steady	64 (100.0%)	64 / 64
Independent	1 (0.8%)	N/A	0 (0.0%)	0 / 16	N/A	0 (0.0%)	0 / 64

=== Full council ===
↓
64

=== Aldermen ===
↓
16

=== Councillors ===
↓
48

== Ward results ==
=== All Saints' ===
All Saints'
Party	Candidate	Votes	%	±%
Liberal	Henry Marsland*	uncontested		
Liberal hold		Swing		

=== Ardwick ===
Ardwick
Party	Candidate	Votes	%	±%
Liberal	William Benjamin Watkins*	uncontested		
Liberal hold		Swing		

=== Cheetham ===
Cheetham
Party	Candidate	Votes	%	±%
Liberal	Thomas Hopkins*	uncontested		
Liberal hold		Swing		

=== Collegiate Church ===
Collegiate Church
Party	Candidate	Votes	%	±%
Liberal	Peter Turner Candelet	75	63.6	N/A
Liberal	Samuel Satterthwaite*	42	35.6	N/A
Independent	John Smith	1	0.8	N/A
Majority		33	15.5	N/A
Turnout		118		
Liberal gain from Liberal		Swing		

=== Exchange ===
Exchange
Party	Candidate	Votes	%	±%
Liberal	Richard Wilson	uncontesed		
Liberal hold		Swing		

=== Medlock Street ===
Medlock Street
Party	Candidate	Votes	%	±%
Liberal	Thomas Wheeler	uncontested		
Liberal hold		Swing		

=== New Cross ===
New Cross
Party	Candidate	Votes	%	±%
Liberal	Henry Day*	uncontested		
Liberal	William Hanley	uncontested		
Liberal hold		Swing		
Liberal hold		Swing		

=== Oxford ===
Oxford
Party	Candidate	Votes	%	±%
Liberal	Thomas Gatenby	uncontested		
Liberal hold		Swing		

=== St. Ann's ===
St. Ann's
Party	Candidate	Votes	%	±%
Liberal	James Bancroft	uncontested		
Liberal hold		Swing		

=== St. Clement's ===
St. Clement's
Party	Candidate	Votes	%	±%
Liberal	Robert George Stracey	uncontested		
Liberal hold		Swing		

=== St. George's ===
St. George's
Party	Candidate	Votes	%	±%
Liberal	Henry Wadkin*	uncontested		
Liberal hold		Swing		

=== St. James' ===
St. James'
Party	Candidate	Votes	%	±%
Liberal	David Ainsworth*	uncontested		
Liberal hold		Swing		

=== St. John's ===
St. John's
Party	Candidate	Votes	%	±%
Liberal	Thomas Bazley	uncontested		
Liberal hold		Swing		

=== St. Luke's ===
St. Luke's
Party	Candidate	Votes	%	±%
Liberal	John Mayson*	uncontested		
Liberal hold		Swing		

=== St. Michael's ===
St. Michael's
Party	Candidate	Votes	%	±%
Liberal	George Wilson	uncontested		
Liberal hold		Swing		

== Aldermanic elections ==
=== Aldermanic election, 9 November 1841 ===
At the meeting of the council on 9 November 1841, the terms of office of eight aldermen expired.

The following eight were elected by the council as alderman on 9 November 1841 for a term of six years.

Party	Alderman	Ward	Term expires
Liberal	Elkanah Armitage	St. Ann's	1847
Liberal	John Burd*	Cheetham	1847
Liberal	George Royle Chappell	St. Luke's	1847
Liberal	Thomas Hopkins	Exchange	1847
Liberal	Alexander Kay*	St. John's	1847
Liberal	James Murray*	New Cross	1847
Liberal	John Shuttleworth*	St. George's	1847
Liberal	Paul Ferdinand Willert	Oxford	1847
