= Brierley (disambiguation) =

- Brierley is a town in South Yorkshire, England.

Brierley may also refer to:

- Brierley, Gloucestershire, England
- Brierley, Herefordshire, England
- Brierley Hill, West Midlands, England

== Other ==
- Brierley (surname)

=== See also ===
- Brierly (surname)
