= Brierly =

Brierly is a surname. Notable people with the surname include:

- Amy Brierly (born 1989), British Paralympian
- Cornelia Brierly (1913–2012), American architect
- David Brierly (1935–2008), English actor
- James Leslie Brierly (1881–1955), English scholar of international law
- Justin W. Brierly (1905–1985), American educator and lawyer
- Oswald Walters Brierly (1817–1894), English marine painter

== See also ==
- Brierly Brook, a community in Nova Scotia
- Brierley (disambiguation)
