= Brierley (surname) =

Brierley is a surname of English origin. The name may refer to:

- Benjamin Brierley (1825–1896), British author
- Benjamin Brierley (rugby union) (born 1986), German rugby union international
- David Brierly (1935–2008), English actor
- Ellen Brierley and Jennet Brierley, two of the twelve witches tried at Lancaster Assizes in August 1612 for their part in the Pendle Hill witchcraft case
- Herbert Brierley, English footballer
- Justin W. Brierly (1905–1985), American educator and lawyer
- Marjorie Brierley (1893–1984), English pioneer of psychoanalysis in Britain
- Roger Brierley (1935–2005), British accountant and actor
- Ron Brierley (born 1937), New Zealand investor and corporate raider
- Saroo Brierley (born c. 1981), Indian/Australian businessman and author, subject of Lion (2016 film)
- Thomas Brierley (1785–1855), British Freemason whose gravestone became a mystery
- Tom Brierley (1910–1989), English and Canadian cricket player
- Walter Brierley (1862–1926), English architect
