= Rusholme (ward) =

- Ward
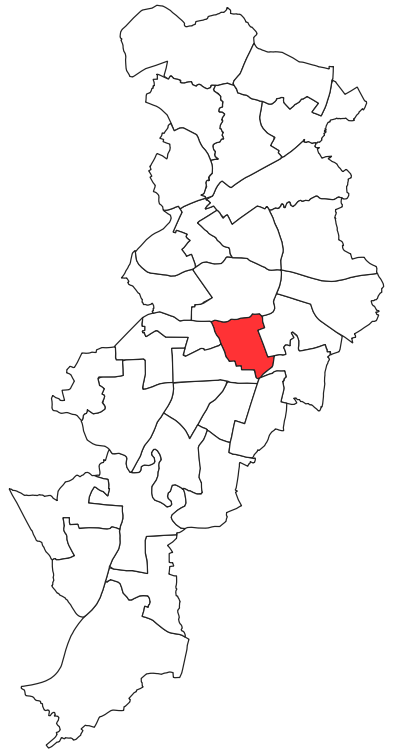
- Rusholme ward (2018) within Manchester

- Coat of arms
- Country: United Kingdom
- Constituent country: England
- Region: North West England
- County: Greater Manchester
- Metropolitan borough: Manchester
- Created: November 1885
- Named for: Rusholme

Government
  - Type: Unicameral
  - Body: Manchester City Council
- UK Parliamentary Constituency: Manchester Rusholme

Rusholme is an electoral division of Manchester City Council which has been represented since 1885. It covers the South Manchester suburb of Rusholme.

== Overview ==
Rusholme ward was created in 1885, following the Manchester City Extension Act 1885, which transferred the townships of Bradford, Harpurhey, and Rusholme to the Manchester corporation. Initially, it covered the whole of the former Rusholme township. Boundary revisions in 1919, transferred that part of the ward to the east of Birchfields road to the Longsight ward. Following a further revision in 1950, the ward's southern boundary became the Fallowfield Loop, before another revision in 1971, transferred part of the Longsight ward to the west of Dickenson Road to the ward. In 1982, the south western portion of the ward was transferred to the new Fallowfield ward. Following a further revision in 2004, that part of the University of Manchester's Fallowfield Campus within the ward was transferred to the Levenshulme ward. At the latest revision in 2018, the north western portion of the Longsight ward to the west of St. John's Road was transferred to the ward.

From its creation until 1918, the ward formed part of the Manchester South Parliamentary constituency. From 1918 until 1950, it was part of the Manchester Rusholme Parliamentary constituency. From 1950 until 1955, it was part of the Manchester Withington Parliamentary constituency. From 1955 until 1983, it was part of the Manchester Ardwick Parliamentary constituency. From 1983 until 2024, it was part of the Manchester Gorton Parliamentary constituency. Since 2024, it has formed part of the Manchester Rusholme Parliamentary constituency.

== Councillors ==
Election	Councillor	Councillor	Councillor
1885	F. E. Estcourt (Con)	W. T. Gunson (Lib)	J. Ramsay (Con)
1886	F. E. Estcourt (Con)	W. T. Gunson (Lib U)	S. Royle (Con)
1887	F. E. Estcourt (Con)	W. T. Gunson (Lib U)	S. Royle (Con)
1888	F. E. Estcourt (Con)	W. T. Gunson (Lib U)	S. Royle (Con)
1889	F. E. Estcourt (Con)	W. T. Gunson (Lib U)	S. Royle (Con)
1890	F. E. Estcourt (Con)	W. T. Gunson (Lib U)	S. Royle (Con)
1891	F. E. Estcourt (Con)	W. T. Gunson (Lib U)	S. Royle (Con)
1892	F. E. Estcourt (Con)	W. T. Gunson (Lib U)	H. Plummer (Ind)
1893	F. E. Estcourt (Con)	E. Holt (Lib)	H. Plummer (Lib)
1894	F. E. Estcourt (Con)	E. Holt (Lib)	H. Plummer (Lib)
1895	F. E. Estcourt (Con)	E. Holt (Lib)	H. Plummer (Lib)
1896	F. E. Estcourt (Con)	E. Holt (Lib)	H. Plummer (Lib)
1897	G. K Ashton (Con)	E. Holt (Lib)	H. Plummer (Lib)
1898	G. K. Ashton (Con)	E. Holt (Lib)	H. Plummer (Lib)
1899	G. K. Ashton (Con)	E. Holt (Lib)	H. Plummer (Lib)
1900	G. K. Ashton (Con)	E. Holt (Lib)	H. Plummer (Lib)
1901	G. K. Ashton (Con)	E. Holt (Lib)	H. Plummer (Lib)
1902	G. K. Ashton (Con)	E. Holt (Lib)	H. Plummer (Lib)
June 1903	G. K. Ashton (Con)	W. F. Lane Scott (Con)	H. Plummer (Lib)
1903	G. K. Ashton (Con)	W. F. Lane Scott (Con)	H. Plummer (Lib)
1904	G. K. Ashton (Con)	W. F. Lane Scott (Con)	H. Plummer (Lib)
1905	G. K. Ashton (Con)	W. F. Lane Scott (Con)	H. Plummer (Lib)
1906	G. K. Ashton (Con)	W. F. Lane Scott (Con)	H. Plummer (Lib)
1907	G. K. Ashton (Con)	W. F. Lane Scott (Con)	H. Plummer (Lib)
December 1907	G. K. Ashton (Con)	W. F. Lane Scott (Con)	J. D. Chantler (Con)
1908	G. K. Ashton (Con)	W. F. Lane Scott (Con)	J. D. Chantler (Con)
1909	G. K. Ashton (Con)	W. F. Lane Scott (Con)	J. D. Chantler (Con)
1910	G. K. Ashton (Con)	W. F. Lane Scott (Con)	J. D. Chantler (Con)
June 1911	E. F. M. Susman (Lib)	W. F. Lane Scott (Con)	J. D. Chantler (Con)
1911	E. F. M. Susman (Lib)	W. F. Lane Scott (Con)	J. D. Chantler (Con)
1912	E. F. M. Susman (Lib)	W. F. Lane Scott (Con)	J. D. Chantler (Con)
1913	E. F. M. Susman (Lib)	W. F. Lane Scott (Con)	J. D. Chantler (Con)
1914	E. F. M. Susman (Lib)	W. F. Lane Scott (Con)	J. D. Chantler (Con)
1919	E. F. M. Sutton (Lib)	J. Parkinson (Con)	J. D. Chantler (Con)
1920	E. F. M. Sutton (Lib)	J. Parkinson (Con)	C. H. Barlow (Lib)
1921	E. F. M. Sutton (Lib)	W. Flinn (Lib)	C. H. Barlow (Lib)
1922	E. F. M. Sutton (Lib)	W. Flinn (Lib)	C. H. Barlow (Lib)
1923	E. F. M. Sutton (Lib)	W. Flinn (Lib)	C. H. Barlow (Lib)
1924	E. F. M. Sutton (Lib)	R. G. Edwards (Lib)	C. H. Barlow (Lib)
1925	E. F. M. Sutton (Lib)	R. G. Edwards (Lib)	C. H. Barlow (Lib)
1926	E. F. M. Sutton (Lib)	R. G. Edwards (Lib)	C. H. Barlow (Lib)
1927	E. F. M. Sutton (Lib)	R. G. Edwards (Lib)	C. H. Barlow (Lib)
1928	E. F. M. Sutton (Lib)	R. G. Edwards (Lib)	C. H. Barlow (Lib)
May 1929	F. A. Jackson (Con)	R. G. Edwards (Lib)	C. H. Barlow (Lib)
1929	F. A. Jackson (Con)	R. G. Edwards (Lib)	C. H. Barlow (Lib)
1930	F. A. Jackson (Con)	R. G. Edwards (Lib)	C. H. Barlow (Lib)
1931	F. A. Jackson (Con)	R. G. Edwards (Lib)	C. H. Barlow (Lib)
1932	F. A. Jackson (Con)	R. G. Edwards (Lib)	C. H. Barlow (Lib)
1933	F. A. Jackson (Con)	R. G. Edwards (Lib)	C. H. Barlow (Lib)
1934	F. A. Jackson (Con)	R. G. Edwards (Lib)	C. H. Barlow (Lib)
1935	F. A. Jackson (Con)	R. G. Edwards (Lib)	C. H. Barlow (Lib)
January 1936	R. C. Rodgers (Con)	R. G. Edwards (Lib)	C. H. Barlow (Lib)
1936	R. C. Rodgers (Con)	R. G. Edwards (Lib)	C. H. Barlow (Lib)
October 1937	R. C. Rodgers (Con)	R. G. Edwards (Lib)	A. T. Barratt (Con)
1937	R. C. Rodgers (Con)	R. G. Edwards (Lib)	A. T. Barratt (Con)
1938	R. C. Rodgers (Con)	R. G. Edwards (Lib)	A. T. Barratt (Con)
1945	R. C. Rodgers (Con)	H. Stockdale (Con)	A. T. Barratt (Con)
1946	R. C. Rodgers (Con)	H. Stockdale (Con)	A. T. Barratt (Con)
1947	R. C. Rodgers (Con)	H. Stockdale (Con)	A. T. Barratt (Con)
1949	R. C. Rodgers (Con)	H. Stockdale (Con)	A. T. Barratt (Con)
1950	R. C. Rodgers (Con)	H. Stockdale (Con)	A. T. Barratt (Con)
1951	R. C. Rodgers (Con)	H. Stockdale (Con)	A. T. Barratt (Con)
1952	R. C. Rodgers (Con)	H. Stockdale (Con)	A. T. Barratt (Con)
1953	R. C. Rodgers (Con)	H. Stockdale (Con)	A. T. Barratt (Con)
1954	R. C. Rodgers (Con)	H. Stockdale (Con)	A. T. Barratt (Con)
1955	R. C. Rodgers (Con)	H. Stockdale (Con)	A. T. Barratt (Con)
1956	K. Ollerenshaw (Con)	H. Stockdale (Con)	A. T. Barratt (Con)
1957	K. Ollerenshaw (Con)	H. Stockdale (Con)	A. T. Barratt (Con)
1958	K. Ollerenshaw (Con)	H. Stockdale (Con)	A. T. Barratt (Con)
1959	K. Ollerenshaw (Con)	H. Stockdale (Con)	A. T. Barratt (Con)
1960	K. Ollerenshaw (Con)	H. Stockdale (Con)	A. T. Barratt (Con)
March 1961	K. Ollerenshaw (Con)	H. Stockdale (Con)	F. W. Harrison (Con)
1961	K. Ollerenshaw (Con)	H. Stockdale (Con)	F. W. Harrison (Con)
1962	K. Ollerenshaw (Con)	H. Stockdale (Con)	F. W. Harrison (Con)
1963	K. Ollerenshaw (Con)	H. Stockdale (Con)	F. W. Harrison (Con)
1964	K. Ollerenshaw (Con)	H. Stockdale (Con)	F. W. Harrison (Con)
1965	K. Ollerenshaw (Con)	H. Stockdale (Con)	F. W. Harrison (Con)
January 1966	K. Ollerenshaw (Con)	C. R. Mayoh (Con)	F. W. Harrison (Con)
1966	K. Ollerenshaw (Con)	C. R. Mayoh (Con)	F. W. Harrison (Con)
1967	K. Ollerenshaw (Con)	C. R. Mayoh (Con)	F. W. Harrison (Con)
1968	K. Ollerenshaw (Con)	A. G. Thornhill (Con)	F. W. Harrison (Con)
1969	K. Ollerenshaw (Con)	A. G. Thornhill (Con)	T. R. Phillips (Con)
1970	K. Ollerenshaw (Con)	S. R. Tucker (Con)	T. R. Phillips (Con)
September 1970	M. Pierce (Con)	S. R. Tucker (Con)	T. R. Phillips (Con)
1971	M. Pierce (Con)	S. R. Tucker (Con)	L. J. Lamb (Lab)
1972	M. Pierce (Con)	S. R. Tucker (Con)	T. R. Phillips (Con)
1973	M. Pierce (Con)	K. Ollerenshaw (Con)	S. R. Tucker (Con)
1975	M. Pierce (Con)	K. Ollerenshaw (Con)	S. R. Tucker (Con)
1976	M. Pierce (Con)	K. Ollerenshaw (Con)	S. R. Tucker (Con)
1978	M. Pierce (Con)	K. Ollerenshaw (Con)	S. R. Tucker (Con)
1979	M. Pierce (Con)	K. Ollerenshaw (Con)	A. J. Bateman (Lab)
1980	M. Pierce (Con)	J. Nicholson (Lab)	A. J. Bateman (Lab)
October 1981	M. Pierce (Con)	J. Nicholson (Lab)	A. J. Bateman (SDP)
1982	T. Egan (Lab)	J. Nicholson (Lab)	M. Roff (Lab)
1983	T. Egan (Lab)	J. Nicholson (Lab)	M. Roff (Lab)
1984	T. Egan (Lab)	J. Nicholson (Lab)	M. Roff (Lab)
1986	J. Byrne (Lab)	J. Nicholson (Lab)	Y. Mambu (Lab)
1987	J. Byrne (Lab)	J. Nicholson (Lab)	M. Ramsbottom (Lib)
1988	J. Byrne (Lab)	Y. Mambu (Lab)	M. Ramsbottom (SLD)
1990	J. Byrne (Lab)	Y. Mambu (Lab)	M. Ramsbottom (Lib Dem)
1991	J. Byrne (Lab)	Y. Mambu (Lab)	M. Manning (Lab)
March 1992	J. Byrne (Lab)	Y. Mambu (Lab)	M. Manning (Ind. Lab)
1992	J. Byrne (Lab)	Y. Mambu (Lab)	M. Manning (Ind. Lab)
1994	J. Byrne (Lab)	Y. Mambu (Lab)	M. Manning (Ind. Lab)
1995	J. Byrne (Lab)	Y. Mambu (Lab)	J. Chaudhry (Lab)
1996	J. Byrne (Lab)	Y. Mambu (Lab)	J. Chaudhry (Lab)
1998	J. Byrne (Lab)	Y. Mambu (Lab)	J. Chaudhry (Lab)
1999	J. Byrne (Lab)	Y. Mambu (Lab)	Z. Mir (Lab)
2000	J. Byrne (Lab)	P. Shannon (Lib Dem)	Z. Mir (Lab)
2002	J. Byrne (Lab)	P. Shannon (Lib Dem)	Z. Mir (Lab)
2003	J. Byrne (Lab)	P. Shannon (Lib Dem)	L. Williams (Lib Dem)
2004	Paul Shannon (Lib Dem)	Abu Chowdhury (Lib Dem)	Lynne Williams (Lib Dem)
2006	Paul Shannon (Lib Dem)	Abu Chowdhury (Lib Dem)	Lynne Williams (Lib Dem)
2007	Paul Shannon (Lib Dem)	Abu Chowdhury (Lib Dem)	Lynne Williams (Lib Dem)
2008	Paul Shannon (Lib Dem)	Abu Chowdhury (Lib Dem)	Lynne Williams (Lib Dem)
2010	Paul Shannon (Lib Dem)	Abu Chowdhury (Lib Dem)	Rabnawaz Akbar (Lab)
2011	Paul Shannon (Lib Dem)	Kate Chappell (Lab)	Rabnawaz Akbar (Lab)
2012	Ahmed Ali (Lab)	Kate Chappell (Lab)	Rabnawaz Akbar (Lab)
2014	Ahmed Ali (Lab)	Kate Chappell (Lab)	Rabnawaz Akbar (Lab)
2015	Ahmed Ali (Lab)	Kate Chappell (Lab)	Rabnawaz Akbar (Lab)
2016	Ahmed Ali (Lab)	Kate Chappell (Lab)	Rabnawaz Akbar (Lab)
May 2017	Ahmed Ali (Lab)	Jill Lovecy (Lab)	Rabnawaz Akbar (Lab)
2018	Rabnawaz Akbar (Lab)	Jill Lovecy (Lab)	Ahmed Ali (Lab)
2019	Rabnawaz Akbar (Lab)	Jill Lovecy (Lab)	Ahmed Ali (Lab)
2021	Rabnawaz Akbar (Lab)	Jill Lovecy (Lab)	Ahmed Ali (Lab)
2022	Rabnawaz Akbar (Lab)	Jill Lovecy (Lab)	Ahmed Ali (Lab)
2023	Rabnawaz Akbar (Lab)	Jill Lovecy (Lab)	Ahmed Ali (Lab)
2024	Rabnawaz Akbar (Lab)	Jill Lovecy (Lab)	Ahmed Ali (Lab)
2026	Shams Syed (Grn)	Jill Lovecy (Lab)	Ahmed Ali (Lab)

== Elections ==
=== Elections in 2020s ===
==== May 2026 ====
2026
Party	Candidate	Votes	%	±%
Green	Shams Syed	1,919	48.4	N/A
Labour	Rabnawaz Akbar*	1,066	26.9	−60.0
Workers Party	Mohhamed Bilal	579	14.6	N/A
Reform	Norman Hesketh-Hart	155	3.9	N/A
Conservative	Jason McLeod	122	3.1	−3.0
Liberal Democrats	Greg Sammons	120	3.0	−3.2
Majority		853	21.5	N/A
Turnout		3,961	32.5	+10.2
Green gain from Labour		Swing		

==== May 2024 ====
2024
Party	Candidate	Votes	%	±%
Labour	Jill Lovecy*	1,608	43.0	32.5 ▼
Workers Party	Naznin Hussain	823	22.0	New
Independent	Mohammed Wahab Sajjad	555	14.8	New
Green	Dennis Pirdzuns	413	11.0	0.3 ▼
Conservative	Joseph Bernard Kalokoh	143	3.8	5.4 ▼
Liberal Democrats	Gregory Thomas Sammons	124	3.3	0.6 ▼
Independent	Shahid Qazi	42	1.1	
Majority		785	21.0	
Rejected ballots		34	0.9	
Turnout		3,742	29.8	
Registered electors		12,542		
Labour hold		Swing	27.2 ▼	

==== May 2023 ====
2023
Party	Candidate	Votes	%	±%
Labour	Ahmed Ali*	2,371	80.1	5.2▲
Green	Dennis Pirdzuns	249	8.4	4.3 ▼
Conservative	Jason McLeod	204	6.9	2.0▲
Liberal Democrats	Greg Sammons	135	4.6	2.0▼
Majority		2,122		
Rejected ballots		22		
Turnout		2,981	25.42	
Registered electors		11,729		
Labour hold		Swing		

==== May 2022 ====
2022
Party	Candidate	Votes	%	±%
Labour	Rabnawaz Akbar*	2,408	86.9	12.6 ▲
Liberal Democrats	Mohammed Sabbagh	171	6.2	1.9 ▼
Conservative	Usman Arshed	169	6.1	1.3 ▲
Majority		2,237		
Rejected ballots		24		
Turnout		2,772	22.3	4.9 ▼
Registered electors		12,413		
Labour hold		Swing	7.3 ▲	

==== May 2021 ====
2021
Party	Candidate	Votes	%	±%
Labour	Jill Lovecy*	2,491	75.5	6.7 ▼
Green	Natasha Turner	374	11.3	6.6 ▲
Conservative	Fahim Choudhury	306	9.2	4.7 ▲
Liberal Democrats	Melvin Sowah	127	3.9	4.7 ▼
Majority		2,117	64.2	
Rejected ballots		19	0.6	
Turnout		3,317	26.7	0.5 ▼
Registered electors		12,315		
Labour hold		Swing	6.7 ▼	

=== Elections in 2010s ===
==== May 2019 ====
2019
Party	Candidate	Votes	%	±%
Labour	Ahmed Ali*	2,266	74.9	▲2.6
Green	Kate Walsh Benson	384	12.7	▲0.2
Liberal Democrats	Holly Matthies	201	6.6	▼2.5
Conservative	Shazia Anjum	148	4.9	▲0.9
Majority		1,882	62.2	▲2.4
Rejected ballots		27	0.89	
Turnout		3,026	26.19	▼1.0
Registered electors		11,555		
Labour hold		Swing	▲1.2	

==== May 2018 ====
2018 (3 vacancies; new boundaries)
Party	Candidate	Votes	%	±%
Labour	Rabnawaz Akbar*	2,484	74.3	
Labour	Jill Lovecy*	2,433	72.8	
Labour	Ahmed Ali*	2,416	72.3	
Green	George Salomon	416	12.5	
Liberal Democrats	Holly Matthies	269	8.1	
Liberal Democrats	Abu Chowdhury	263	7.9	
Liberal Democrats	Dave Page	237	7.1	
Conservative	Mehreen Qazi	161	4.8	
Conservative	Amir Moore	142	4.3	
Conservative	Roozbeh Sarkohaki	96	2.9	
Majority				
Turnout		3,341	27.2	
Labour win (new boundaries)				
Labour win (new boundaries)				
Labour win (new boundaries)				

==== May 2017 (by-election) ====
By-election: 4 May 2017
Party	Candidate	Votes	%	±%
Labour	Jill Lovecy	2,188	64.2	
Liberal Democrats	Amaan Hashmi	576	16.9	
Green	Anne Loveday Tucker	458	13.4	
Conservative	David Robert Semple	151	4.4	
TUSC	Jack Joseph Metcalf	37	1.1	
Majority		1,612	47.3	
Turnout		3,410	34.9	
Labour hold		Swing		

==== May 2016 ====
2016
Party	Candidate	Votes	%	±%
Labour	Ahmed Ali*	2.346	75.1	+0.3
Green	Rob Jones	415	13.3	+5.5
Liberal Democrats	Abu Mohiuddin Chowdhury	195	6.3	−6.2
Conservative	Archie Stuart Galbraith	166	5.3	+1.9
Majority		1,931	61.9	
Turnout		3,122	31.24	
Labour hold		Swing		

==== May 2015 ====
2015
Party	Candidate	Votes	%	±%
Labour	Kate Chappell*	3,796	68.7	+7.4
Green	Vicky Matthews	848	15.4	+6.7
Conservative	Sajid Hussain	463	8.4	+2.6
Liberal Democrats	Abu Mohiuddin Chowdhury	326	5.9	−18.3
TUSC	John McFarlane	90	1.6	N/A
Majority		2,948	53.3	
Turnout		5,523	56.9	+22.8
Labour hold		Swing		

==== May 2014 ====
2014
Party	Candidate	Votes	%	±%
Labour	Rabnawaz Akbar*	2,438	69.72	
Green	Joseph Ian Clough	517	14.78	
Liberal Democrats	Abu Mohiuddin Chowdhury	261	7.46	
Conservative	Georgina Elizabeth Calle	191	5.46	
TUSC	John William McFarlane	90	2.57	
Majority		1,921	54.9	
Turnout		3,497	32.3	
Labour hold		Swing		

==== May 2012 ====
2012
Party	Candidate	Votes	%	±%
Labour	Ahmed Ali	2,100	74.8	+47.6
Liberal Democrats	Paul Shannon*	352	12.5	−30.2
Green	Dane Lam	220	7.8	+1.6
Conservative	James Johnson	96	3.4	−8.0
Independent	Pip Moss	41	1.5	N/A
Majority		1,748	62	
Turnout		2,809	26	
Labour gain from Liberal Democrats		Swing		

==== May 2011 ====
2011
Party	Candidate	Votes	%	±%
Labour	Kate Chappell	2,238	61.3	+35.9
Liberal Democrats	Abu Chowdhury*	883	24.2	−18.1
Green	Richard Lane	319	8.7	+1.1
Conservative	Dola Miah	212	5.8	−0.7
Majority		1,355	37.1	
Turnout		3,652	34.1	
Labour gain from Liberal Democrats		Swing		

==== May 2010 ====
2010
Party	Candidate	Votes	%	±%
Labour	Rabnawaz Akbar	2,259	44.1	+16.9
Liberal Democrats	Tanvir Akhtar	1,885	36.8	−5.9
Conservative	Dola Miah	466	9.1	−2.3
Green	Justine Hall	342	6.7	+0.5
TUSC	Nahella Ashraf	95	1.9	+1.9
Respect	Ali Shelmani	73	1.4	+1.4
Majority		374	7.3	−8.3
Turnout		5,120	51.3	+25.6
Labour gain from Liberal Democrats		Swing	+11.4	

=== Elections in 2000s ===
==== May 2008 ====
2008
Party	Candidate	Votes	%	±%
Liberal Democrats	Paul Shannon*	1,090	42.7	+0.4
Labour	Atiha Chaudry	693	27.2	+1.8
Left List	Nahella Ashraf	320	12.5	−5.7
Conservative	Dola Miah	291	11.4	+4.9
Green	Penny Collins	158	6.2	−1.4
Majority		397	15.6	−1.3
Turnout		2,552	25.7	−5.0
Liberal Democrats hold		Swing	-0.7	

==== May 2007 ====
2007
Party	Candidate	Votes	%	±%
Liberal Democrats	Abu Chowdhury*	1,241	42.3	+2.4
Labour	Atiha Chaudry	746	25.4	−2.3
Respect	Nahella Ashraf	535	18.2	−3.0
Green	Penny Collins	224	7.6	+1.1
Conservative	Daniel Valentine	190	6.5	+1.8
Majority		495	16.9	+4.7
Turnout		2,936	30.7	−0.8
Liberal Democrats hold		Swing	+2.3	

==== May 2006 ====
2006
Party	Candidate	Votes	%	±%
Liberal Democrats	Lynne Williams*	1,157	39.9	−16.0
Labour	John Byrne	804	27.7	−0.8
Respect	Nahella Ashraf	615	21.2	+21.2
Green	Penelope Irene Collins	188	6.5	−2.9
Conservative	Barbara Mary Goodall	135	4.7	−1.4
Majority		353	12.2	−15.1
Turnout		2,899	31.5	−6.5
Liberal Democrats hold		Swing	-7.6	

==== June 2004 ====
2004 (3 vacancies; new boundaries)
Party	Candidate	Votes	%	±%
Liberal Democrats	Paul Shannon*	1,958	55.4	
Liberal Democrats	Abu Chowdhury	1,901	53.7	
Liberal Democrats	Lynne Williams*	1,894	53.5	
Labour	Nilofar Siddiqi	1,000	28.3	
Labour	John Byrne*	952	26.9	
Labour	Zafar Mir	889	25.1	
Green	Penelope Collins	329	9.3	
Green	Christopher Middleton	234	6.6	
Conservative	Cedric Beniston	214	6.1	
Green	John Poole	203	5.7	
Conservative	Barbara Goodall	200	5.7	
Conservative	Tadeusz Sochacki	160	4.5	
Majority		894	25.2	
Turnout		3,537	38.0	
Liberal Democrats win (new seat)				
Liberal Democrats win (new seat)				
Liberal Democrats win (new seat)				

==== May 2003 ====
2003
Party	Candidate	Votes	%	±%
Liberal Democrats	Lynne Williams	1,850	64.8	+25.4
Labour	Zafar Mir*	722	25.3	−23.6
Conservative	Barbara Goodall	138	4.8	−1.2
Socialist Alliance	Mary Ainslie	76	2.7	+2.7
Green	Christopher Middleton	69	2.4	−3.2
Majority		1,128	39.5	+30.1
Turnout		2,855	23.0	+1.7
Liberal Democrats gain from Labour		Swing	+24.5	

==== May 2002 ====
2002
Party	Candidate	Votes	%	±%
Labour	John Byrne*	1,304	48.9	+15.4
Liberal Democrats	Lynne Williams	1,052	39.4	−18.7
Conservative	Barbara Goodall	161	6.0	+1.8
Green	Christopher Middleton	150	5.6	+2.0
Majority		252	9.4	−15.2
Turnout		2,667	21.3	−1.0
Labour hold		Swing	+17.0	

==== May 2000 ====
2000
Party	Candidate	Votes	%	±%
Liberal Democrats	Paul Shannon	1,613	58.1	+14.0
Labour	Jawaid Chaudhry	930	33.5	−11.8
Conservative	Daniel Bunting	116	4.2	−1.8
Green	Adam Higgin	100	3.6	−1.1
Independent Labour	Michael Robinson	15	0.5	+0.5
Majority		683	24.6	+23.4
Turnout		2,774	22.3	+0.9
Liberal Democrats gain from Labour		Swing	+12.9	

=== Elections in 1990s ===
==== May 1999 ====
1999
Party	Candidate	Votes	%	±%
Labour	Zafar Mir	1,153	45.3	+1.7
Liberal Democrats	Paul Shannon	1,122	44.1	+12.1
Conservative	Karen Abbad	152	6.0	−3.1
Green	Bernard Ekbery	119	4.7	+1.3
Majority		31	1.2	−10.4
Turnout		2,546	21.4	
Labour hold		Swing	-5.2	

==== May 1998 ====
1998
Party	Candidate	Votes	%	±%
Labour	John Byrne*	945	43.6	−6.8
Liberal Democrats	Ray Atkins	693	32.0	+1.8
Independent Labour	Michael Robinson	211	9.7	+9.7
Conservative	Karen Abbad	197	9.1	−0.5
Green	Bernard Ekbery	74	3.4	+3.4
Socialist Labour	Trevor Wongsam	47	2.2	+2.2
Majority		252	11.6	−8.7
Turnout		2,167		
Labour hold		Swing	-4.3	

==== May 1996 ====
1996
Party	Candidate	Votes	%	±%
Labour	Yomi Mambu*	1,224	49.9	+7.4
Liberal Democrats	Shakeel Ahmad	732	29.9	−4.0
Socialist	Margaret Manning	239	9.7	+9.7
Conservative	Daniel Bunting	232	9.5	+6.6
Communist League	T. Rigby	23	0.9	+0.9
Majority		492	20.0	+11.4
Turnout		2,450		
Labour hold		Swing	+5.7	

==== May 1995 ====
1995
Party	Candidate	Votes	%	±%
Labour	Jawaid Chaudhry	1,270	42.5	+3.2
Liberal Democrats	Marc Ramsbottom	1,014	33.9	−1.8
Independent Labour	Margaret Manning*	371	12.4	+12.4
Independent	Micheal Robinson	248	8.3	+5.4
Conservative	R. Norris	86	2.9	−12.3
Majority		256	8.6	+5.0
Turnout		2,989		
Labour gain from Independent Labour		Swing	+2.5	

==== May 1994 ====
1994
Party	Candidate	Votes	%	±%
Labour	J. Byrne*	1,451	39.3	−4.2
Liberal Democrats	M. Ramsbottom	1,318	35.7	+4.2
Conservative	M. Naqui	561	15.2	−2.3
Green	B. Bingham	178	4.8	−2.8
Independent	K. Robinson	107	2.9	+2.9
Independent	I. Ferguson	81	2.2	+2.2
Majority		133	3.6	−8.4
Turnout		3,696		
Labour hold		Swing	-4.2	

==== May 1992 ====
1992
Party	Candidate	Votes	%	±%
Labour	Y. Mambu*	1,104	43.5	−9.8
Liberal Democrats	A. Chowdhury	799	31.5	+10.1
Conservative	R. Norris	444	17.5	+4.2
Green	B. Bingham	192	7.6	−4.5
Majority		305	12.0	−19.9
Turnout		2,539		
Labour hold		Swing	-9.9	

==== May 1991 ====
1991
Party	Candidate	Votes	%	±%
Labour	M. Manning	1,848	53.3	−11.4
Liberal Democrats	C. F. L. McGrath	742	21.4	+1.8
Conservative	R. S. Norris	460	13.3	+13.3
Green	B. S. Bingham	418	12.1	−3.6
Majority		1,106	31.9	−13.1
Turnout		3,468	35.9	
Labour gain from Liberal Democrats		Swing	-6.6	

==== May 1990 ====
1990
Party	Candidate	Votes	%	±%
Labour	J. Byrne*	2,532	64.7	+20.9
Liberal Democrats	C. A. James	769	19.6	−15.7
Green	B. S. Bingham	614	15.7	+10.0
Majority		1,763	45.0	+36.5
Turnout		3,915		
Labour hold		Swing	+18.3	

=== Elections in 1980s ===
==== May 1988 ====
1988
Party	Candidate	Votes	%	±%
Labour	Y. Mambu	1,876	43.8	+4.6
SLD	A. Choudhury	1,512	35.3	−10.7
Conservative	N. F. Barnes	652	15.2	+3.4
Green	B. S. Bingham	245	5.7	+2.7
Majority		364	8.5	+1.7
Turnout		4,285		
Labour hold		Swing	+7.6	

==== May 1987 ====
1987
Party	Candidate	Votes	%	±%
Liberal	Marc Ramsbottom	2,310	46.0	+5.5
Labour	Yomi Mambu*	1,969	39.2	−7.9
Conservative	Nigel Barnes	594	11.8	+1.4
Green	Alison Hunt	149	3.0	+3.0
Majority		341	6.8	+0.2
Turnout		5,022		
Liberal gain from Labour		Swing	+6.7	

==== May 1986 ====
1986 (2 vacancies)
Party	Candidate	Votes	%	±%
Labour	J. Byrne	2,137	47.1	−1.0
Labour	S. Mambu	1,946		
Liberal	Z. Gazdecki	1,840	40.5	+6.0
Liberal	M. Ramsbottom	1,815		
Conservative	N. Barnes	474	10.4	−5.1
Conservative	G. Taylor	419		
Communist	P. Singh	86	1.9	+1.9
Majority		106	6.6	−7.0
Turnout		4,537		
Labour hold		Swing		
Labour hold		Swing	-3.5	

==== May 1984 ====
1984
Party	Candidate	Votes	%	±%
Labour	John Nicholson*	2,125	48.1	+1.2
Liberal	Guy Goodman	1,525	34.5	+10.4
Conservative	S. Denney	685	15.5	−12.2
Independent	S. Shah	87	2.0	+2.0
Majority		600	13.6	−5.6
Turnout		4,422		
Labour hold		Swing	-4.6	

==== May 1983 ====
1983
Party	Candidate	Votes	%	±%
Labour	Margaret Roff*	2,102	46.9	+2.7
Conservative	Shakir Hussain	1,242	27.7	−6.3
Liberal	Guy Goodman	1,081	24.1	+2.4
Independent	Frederick Melling	54	1.2	+1.2
Majority		860	19.2	+9.0
Turnout		4,479		
Labour hold		Swing	+4.5	

==== May 1982 ====
1982 (3 vacancies; new boundaries)
Party	Candidate	Votes	%	±%
Labour	Thomas Egan	1,926	42.6	
Labour	John Nicholson*	1,895	41.9	
Labour	Margaret Roff	1,823	40.3	
Conservative	Shakir Hussain	1,484	32.8	
Conservative	Alan Catchpole	1,350	29.8	
Conservative	Catherine McQuade	1,313	29.0	
Liberal	Peter Thompson	947	20.9	
Liberal	Audrey Greaves	920	20.3	
Liberal	David Tierney	843	18.6	
Majority		339	7.5	
Turnout		4,526	44.5	
Labour win (new seat)				
Labour win (new seat)				
Labour win (new seat)				

==== May 1980 ====
1980
Party	Candidate	Votes	%	±%
Labour	J. Nicholson	2,537	51.3	+9.0
Conservative	K. Ollerenshaw*	1,765	35.7	−5.2
Liberal	D. Senior	352	7.1	−2.6
Ecology	D. Dalton	295	6.0	−1.1
Majority		772	15.6	+14.3
Turnout		4,949	34.2	−31.6
Labour gain from Conservative		Swing	+7.1	

=== Elections in 1970s ===
==== May 1979 ====
1979
Party	Candidate	Votes	%	±%
Labour	A. J. Bateman	3,804	42.3	+4.2
Conservative	S. Tucker*	3,685	40.9	−14.1
Liberal	D. Senior	870	9.7	+2.8
Ecology	S. L. Howarth	641	7.1	+7.1
Majority		119	1.3	−15.6
Turnout		9,000	65.8	+36.0
Labour gain from Conservative		Swing	+9.1	

==== May 1978 ====
1978
Party	Candidate	Votes	%	±%
Conservative	M. Pierce*	2,289	55.0	−9.2
Labour	L. Byrne	1,585	38.1	+5.5
Liberal	M. J. Hodgson	286	6.9	+6.9
Majority		704	16.9	−14.8
Turnout		4,160	29.8	
Conservative hold		Swing	-7.3	

==== May 1976 ====
1976
Party	Candidate	Votes	%	±%
Conservative	K. Ollerenshaw*	2,580	64.2	−0.6
Labour	W. J. Courtney	1,308	32.6	+9.4
Independent	C. R. Sedman	130	3.2	+3.2
Majority		1,272	31.7	−9.9
Turnout		4,018		
Conservative hold		Swing	-5.0	

==== May 1975 ====
1975
Party	Candidate	Votes	%	±%
Conservative	S. Tucker*	2,196	64.8	+5.0
Labour	P. J. Rowbotham	785	23.2	−6.8
Liberal	F. A. Melling	408	12.0	+12.0
Majority		1,411	41.6	+11.8
Turnout		3,389		
Conservative hold		Swing	+5.9	

==== May 1973 ====
1973 (3 vacancies; reorganisation)
Party	Candidate	Votes	%	±%
Conservative	M. Pierce*	2,221	61.8	+0.8
Conservative	K. Ollerenshaw*	2,191	61.0	0
Conservative	S. Tucker*	2,173	60.5	−0.5
Labour	A. H. Fender	1,115	31.0	−2.9
Labour	M. A. Naqui*	1,091	30.4	−3.5
Labour	H. Rowley	1,090	30.3	−3.6
Independent	F. A. Melling	379	10.5	+7.7
Majority		1,058	29.4	+2.3
Turnout		3,594		
Conservative hold		Swing		
Conservative hold		Swing		
Conservative hold		Swing		

==== May 1972 ====
1972
Party	Candidate	Votes	%	±%
Conservative	T. E. Phillips	2,371	61.0	+12.0
Labour	L. J. Lamb*	1,317	33.9	−13.4
Independent	A. Melling	109	2.8	N/A
Communist	G. H. Mills	93	2.3	−5.4
Majority		1,054	27.1	
Turnout		3,890		
Conservative gain from Labour		Swing		

==== May 1971 ====
1971 (3 vacancies; new boundaries)
Party	Candidate	Votes	%	±%
Conservative	M. Pierce*	2,418	49.0	
Conservative	S. Tucker*	2,397	48.6	
Labour	L. J. Lamb	2,332	47.3	
Conservative	T. Phillips*	2,296	46.5	
Labour	D. Cox	2,244	45.5	
Labour	P. M. Morrison	2,178	44.2	
Liberal	F. N. Wedlock	557	11.3	
Communist	G. H. Mills	378	7.7	
Majority		36	0.7	
Turnout		4,933		
Conservative win (new seat)				
Conservative win (new seat)				
Labour win (new seat)				

==== September 1970 (by-election) ====
By-election: 24 September 1970
Party	Candidate	Votes	%	±%
Conservative	M. Pierce	1,531	60.4	−0.4
Labour	J. Smith	1,002	39.6	+12.0
Majority		529	20.8	−12.4
Turnout		2,533		
Conservative hold		Swing		

==== May 1970 ====
1970
Party	Candidate	Votes	%	±%
Conservative	S. R. Tucker	2,074	60.8	−7.5
Labour	J. Smith	942	27.6	+15.6
Liberal	S. Lowe	380	11.2	−8.5
Residents	D. Barnes	14	0.4	N/A
Majority		1,132	33.2	−15.4
Turnout		3,410		
Conservative hold		Swing		

=== Elections in 1960s ===
==== May 1969 ====
1969
Party	Candidate	Votes	%	±%
Conservative	T. R. Phillips	2,227	68.3	−9.2
Liberal	S. Lowe	642	19.7	+10.5
Labour	S. A. Heylin	393	12.0	−1.3
Majority		1,585	48.6	−6.6
Turnout		3,262		
Conservative hold		Swing		

==== May 1968 ====
1968 (2 vacancies)
Party	Candidate	Votes	%	±%
Conservative	K. Ollerenshaw*	2,664	77.5	+4.8
Conservative	A. G. Thornhill	2,442	71.1	−1.6
Labour	A. E. Jones	456	13.3	−4.1
Labour	W. Egerton	352	10.2	−7.2
Liberal	S. Lowe	317	9.2	+1.9
Liberal	A. J. Markin	258	7.5	+0.2
Majority		1,896	55.2	−0.1
Turnout		3,437		
Conservative hold		Swing		
Conservative hold		Swing		

==== May 1967 ====
1967
Party	Candidate	Votes	%	±%
Conservative	C. R. Mayoh*	2,000	72.7	+1.8
Labour	A. E. Jones	478	17.4	−11.7
Liberal	S. Lowe	201	7.3	N/A
Union Movement	J. Marsden	57	2.1	N/A
Independent Labour	C. H. Tremayne-Pearse	14	0.5	N/A
Majority		1,522	55.3	+13.5
Turnout		2,750		
Conservative hold		Swing		

==== May 1966 ====
1966
Party	Candidate	Votes	%	±%
Conservative	F. W. Harrison*	1,997	70.9	+8.8
Labour	A. E. Jones	821	29.1	+7.2
Majority		1,176	41.8	+1.6
Turnout		2,818		
Conservative hold		Swing		

==== January 1966 (by-election) ====
By-election: 27 January 1966
Party	Candidate	Votes	%	±%
Conservative	C. R. Mayoh	1,439	69.9	+7.8
Labour	A. E. Jones	412	20.0	−1.9
Liberal	F. N. Wedlock	207	10.1	−5.9
Majority		1,027	49.9	+9.7
Turnout		2,058		
Conservative hold		Swing		

==== May 1965 ====
1965
Party	Candidate	Votes	%	±%
Conservative	K. Ollerenshaw*	2,302	62.1	+12.9
Labour	A. E. Jones	812	21.9	−7.5
Liberal	M. D. Howard	594	16.0	−5.4
Majority		1,490	40.2	+20.4
Turnout		3,708		
Conservative hold		Swing		

==== May 1964 ====
1964
Party	Candidate	Votes	%	±%
Conservative	H. Stockdale*	1,961	49.2	+1.8
Labour	J. L. Shelmerdine	1,172	29.4	+1.0
Liberal	M. D. Howard	852	21.4	−2.8
Majority		789	19.8	+0.8
Turnout		3,985		
Conservative hold		Swing		

==== May 1963 ====
1963
Party	Candidate	Votes	%	±%
Conservative	F. W. Harrison*	1,981	47.4	+0.5
Labour	J. Broderick	1,189	28.4	+6.2
Liberal	F. N. Wedlock	1,012	24.2	−2.4
Majority		792	19.0	−1.3
Turnout		4,182		
Conservative hold		Swing		

==== May 1962 ====
1962
Party	Candidate	Votes	%	±%
Conservative	K. Ollerenshaw*	2,020	46.9	−9.6
Liberal	F. N. Wedlock	1,148	26.6	+4.0
Labour	D. A. Warby	958	22.2	+1.3
Ratepayers	J. H. Edward	182	4.2	N/A
Majority		872	20.3	−13.6
Turnout		4,308		
Conservative hold		Swing		

==== May 1961 ====
1961
Party	Candidate	Votes	%	±%
Conservative	H. Stockdale*	2,084	56.5	+5.4
Liberal	F. N. Wedlock	834	22.6	+13.4
Labour	D. A. Warby	772	20.9	−0.4
Majority		1,250	33.9	+4.1
Turnout		3,690		
Conservative hold		Swing		

==== March 1961 (by-election) ====
By-election: 9 March 1961
Party	Candidate	Votes	%	±%
Conservative	F. W. Harrison	1,710	60.7	+9.6
Liberal	F. N. Wedlock	594	21.1	+11.9
Labour	G. Berry	515	18.3	−3.0
Majority		1,116	39.6	+9.8
Turnout		2,819		
Conservative hold		Swing		

==== May 1960 ====
1960
Party	Candidate	Votes	%	±%
Conservative	A. T. Barratt*	2,284	51.1	−18.9
Labour	J. S. Goldstone	953	21.3	−8.7
Ratepayers	J. B. Mathers	818	18.3	N/A
Liberal	F. N. Wedlock	412	9.2	N/A
Majority		1,331	29.8	−10.2
Turnout		4,467		
Conservative hold		Swing		

=== Elections in 1950s ===
==== May 1959 ====
1959
Party	Candidate	Votes	%	±%
Conservative	K. Ollerenshaw*	3,066	70.0	+6.5
Labour	K. Graham	1,317	30.0	−6.5
Majority		1,749	40.0	+13.0
Turnout		4,383		
Conservative hold		Swing		

==== May 1958 ====
1958
Party	Candidate	Votes	%	±%
Conservative	H. Stockdale*	2,563	63.5	−3.0
Labour	H. Reid	1,472	36.5	+3.0
Majority		1,091	27.0	−6.0
Turnout		4,035		
Conservative hold		Swing		

==== May 1957 ====
1957
Party	Candidate	Votes	%	±%
Conservative	A. T. Barratt*	2,835	66.5	−2.8
Labour	A. H. Green	1,426	33.5	+2.8
Majority		1,409	33.0	−5.6
Turnout		4,261		
Conservative hold		Swing		

==== May 1956 ====
1956
Party	Candidate	Votes	%	±%
Conservative	K. Ollerenshaw	2,989	69.3	−2.7
Labour	S. C. Rimmer	1,323	30.7	+2.7
Majority		1,666	38.6	−5.4
Turnout		4,312		
Conservative hold		Swing		

==== May 1955 ====
1955
Party	Candidate	Votes	%	±%
Conservative	H. Stockdale*	3,547	72.0	+1.7
Labour	A. H. Green	1,377	28.0	−1.7
Majority		2,170	44.0	+3.4
Turnout		4,924		
Conservative hold		Swing		

==== May 1954 ====
1954
Party	Candidate	Votes	%	±%
Conservative	A. T. Barratt*	3,419	70.3	+0.3
Labour	A. H. Green	1,443	29.7	−0.3
Majority		1,976	40.6	+0.6
Turnout		4,862		
Conservative hold		Swing		

==== May 1953 ====
1953
Party	Candidate	Votes	%	±%
Conservative	R. C. Rodgers*	3,832	70.0	+4.9
Labour	B. Conlan	1,640	30.0	−4.9
Majority		2,192	40.0	+9.8
Turnout		5,472		
Conservative hold		Swing		

==== May 1952 ====
1952
Party	Candidate	Votes	%	±%
Conservative	H. Stockdale*	4,014	65.1	−16.6
Labour	B. Conlan	2,153	34.9	+16.6
Majority		1,861	30.2	−33.2
Turnout		6,167		
Conservative hold		Swing		

==== May 1951 ====
1951
Party	Candidate	Votes	%	±%
Conservative	A. T. Barratt*	4,270	81.7	+8.1
Labour	J. D. Paul	958	18.3	−8.8
Majority		3,312	63.4	+17.6
Turnout		5,228		
Conservative hold		Swing		

==== May 1950 ====
1950 (new boundaries)
Party	Candidate	Votes	%	±%
Conservative	R. C. Rodgers*	4,358	72.9	
Labour	H. Smith	1,621	27.1	
Majority		2,737	45.8	
Turnout		5,979		
Conservative hold		Swing		

=== Elections in 1940s ===
==== May 1949 ====
1949
Party	Candidate	Votes	%	±%
Conservative	H. Stockdale*	5,533	64.9	−3.8
Labour	C. Lynon	2,358	27.7	−3.6
Liberal	G. Bateman	636	7.4	N/A
Majority		3,175	37.2	−0.2
Turnout		8,527		
Conservative hold		Swing		

==== November 1947 ====
1947
Party	Candidate	Votes	%	±%
Conservative	A. T. Barratt*	6,696	68.7	+3.3
Labour	E. Wood	3,057	31.3	−3.3
Majority		3,639	37.4	+6.6
Turnout		9,753		
Conservative hold		Swing		

==== November 1946 ====
1946
Party	Candidate	Votes	%	±%
Conservative	R. C. Rodgers*	5,029	65.4	+10.6
Labour	B. Chamberlain	2,663	34.6	−5.4
Majority		2,366	30.8	+16.0
Turnout		7,692		
Conservative hold		Swing		

==== November 1945 ====
1945
Party	Candidate	Votes	%	±%
Conservative	H. Stockdale	3,402	54.8	−8.8
Labour	A. B. Horan	2,479	40.0	+5.6
Liberal	A. E. Sherlock*	322	5.2	N/A
Majority		923	14.8	−16.4
Turnout		6,203	39.2	
Conservative gain from Liberal		Swing		

=== Elections in 1930s ===
==== November 1938 ====
1938
Party	Candidate	Votes	%	±%
Conservative	A. T. Barratt*	2,590	65.6	−2.3
Labour	W. E. Harrison	1,357	34.4	+2.3
Majority		1,233	31.2	−15.8
Turnout		3,947		
Conservative hold		Swing		

==== November 1937 ====
1937
Party	Candidate	Votes	%	±%
Conservative	R. C. Rodgers*	2,452	67.9	N/A
Labour	W. E. Harrison	1,158	32.1	+6.6
Majority		1,294	47.0	
Turnout		3,610		
Conservative hold		Swing		

==== October 1937 (by-election) ====
By-election: 21 October 1937
Party	Candidate	Votes	%	±%
Conservative	A. T. Barratt	1,867	48.5	N/A
Liberal	H. Brooks	1,154	30.0	−43.5
Labour	W. E. Harrison	827	21.5	−5.0
Majority		713	18.5	
Turnout		3,848		
Conservative gain from Liberal		Swing		

==== November 1936 ====
1936
Party	Candidate	Votes	%	±%
Liberal	R. G. Edwards*	2,383	73.5	+3.0
Labour	W. E. Harrison	859	26.5	−3.0
Majority		1,524	47.0	+6.0
Turnout		3,242		
Liberal hold		Swing		

==== January 1936 (by-election) ====
By-election: 30 January 1936
Party	Candidate	Votes	%	±%
Conservative	R. C. Rodgers	1,684	70.5	N/A
Labour	M. Knight	644	26.9	−2.6
Residents	A. R. Edwards	62	2.6	N/A
Majority		1,040	43.6	
Turnout		2,390		
Conservative hold		Swing		

==== November 1935 ====
1935
Party	Candidate	Votes	%	±%
Liberal	C. H. Barlow*	2,554	70.5	N/A
Labour	W. J. Sharkey	1,069	29.5	−3.9
Majority		1,485	41.0	
Turnout		3,623		
Liberal hold		Swing		

==== November 1934 ====
1934
Party	Candidate	Votes	%	±%
Conservative	F. A. Jackson*	2,419	66.6	N/A
Labour	W. J. Sharkey	1,214	33.4	+4.2
Majority		1,205	33.2	
Turnout		3,633		
Conservative hold		Swing		

==== November 1933 ====
1933
Party	Candidate	Votes	%	±%
Liberal	R. G. Edwards*	2,165	70.8	+1.2
Labour	W. J. Sharkey	895	29.2	+0.1
Majority		1,270	41.6	+1.1
Turnout		3,060		
Liberal hold		Swing		

==== November 1932 ====
1932
Party	Candidate	Votes	%	±%
Liberal	C. H. Barlow*	2,235	69.6	N/A
Labour	J. L. Stocks	933	29.1	N/A
Residents	A. M. Edwards	43	1.3	+3.3
Majority		1,302	40.5	
Turnout		3,211		
Liberal hold		Swing		

==== November 1931 ====
1931
Party	Candidate	Votes	%	±%
Conservative	F. A. Jackson*	3,119	95.4	+50.9
Residents	A. M. Edwards	150	4.6	+2.9
Majority		2,969	90.8	
Turnout		3,269	31.8	
Conservative hold		Swing		

==== November 1930 ====
1930
Party	Candidate	Votes	%	±%
Liberal	R. G. Edwards*	2,295	53.6	−4.8
Conservative	J. Vickers	1,906	44.5	+4.7
Residents	A. R. Edwards	84	1.9	+0.1
Majority		389	9.1	−9.5
Turnout		4,285		
Liberal hold		Swing		

=== Elections in 1920s ===
==== November 1929 ====
1929
Party	Candidate	Votes	%	±%
Liberal	C. H. Barlow*	2,083	58.4	+0.2
Conservative	A. Ellison	1,417	39.8	N/A
Residents	A. M. Edwards	64	1.8	+1.5
Majority		666	18.6	−16.8
Turnout		3,564	36.2	−10.8
Liberal hold		Swing		

==== May 1929 (by-election) ====
By-election: 14 May 1929
Party	Candidate	Votes	%	±%
Conservative	F. A. Jackson	2,272	53.0	N/A
Liberal	A. Heywood	1,956	45.6	−12.6
Residents	A. R. Edwards	61	1.4	+1.1
Majority		316	7.4	
Turnout		4,289	47.0	0
Conservative gain from Liberal		Swing		

==== November 1928 ====
1928
Party	Candidate	Votes	%	±%
Liberal	E. F. M. Sutton*	2,496	58.2	+6.2
Ind. Conservative	M. Hilditch	977	22.8	N/A
Labour	E. Beavan	803	18.7	N/A
Residents	N. E. Walker	12	0.3	N/A
Majority		1,519	35.4	+31.4
Turnout		4,288	47.0	−4.1
Liberal hold		Swing		

==== November 1927 ====
1927
Party	Candidate	Votes	%	±%
Liberal	R. G. Edwards*	2,403	52.0	N/A
Conservative	F. A. Jackson	2,222	48.0	N/A
Majority		181	4.0	N/A
Turnout		4,625	51.1	N/A
Liberal hold		Swing		

==== November 1926 ====
1926
Party	Candidate	Votes	%	±%
Liberal	C. H. Barlow*	uncontested		
Liberal hold		Swing		

==== November 1925 ====
1925
Party	Candidate	Votes	%	±%
Liberal	E. F. M. Sutton*	3,187	81.2	N/A
Labour	W. Davis	740	18.8	N/A
Majority		2,447	62.4	N/A
Turnout		3,927	44.7	N/A
Liberal hold		Swing		

==== November 1924 ====
1924
Party	Candidate	Votes	%	±%
Liberal	R. G. Edwards	uncontested		
Liberal hold		Swing		

==== November 1923 ====
1923
Party	Candidate	Votes	%	±%
Liberal	C. H. Barlow*	1,852	42.0	−49.4
Conservative	S. J. Roberts	1,477	33.5	N/A
Labour	F. G. Lloyd	1,079	24.5	N/A
Majority		375	8.5	−73.7
Turnout		4,408		
Liberal hold		Swing		

==== November 1922 ====
1922
Party	Candidate	Votes	%	±%
Liberal	E. F. M. Sutton*	2,121	91.4	+35.0
Independent	A. R. Edwards	208	8.9	N/A
Majority		1,913	82.2	+69.4
Turnout		2,329	28.7	−15.5
Liberal hold		Swing		

==== November 1921 ====
1921
Party	Candidate	Votes	%	±%
Liberal	W. Flinn	2,007	56.4	+9.5
Conservative	J. Parkinson*	1,550	43.6	+14.6
Majority		457	12.8	−5.1
Turnout		3,557	44.2	+4.6
Liberal gain from Conservative		Swing		

==== November 1920 ====
1920
Party	Candidate	Votes	%	±%
Liberal	C. H. Barlow	1,802	46.9	−19.6
Conservative	M. L. K. Jones	1,112	29.0	−8.7
Labour	R. W. Wright	927	24.1	N/A
Majority		690	17.9	−10.9
Turnout		3,841	39.6	+3.7
Liberal gain from Conservative		Swing		

=== Elections in 1910s ===
==== November 1919 ====
1919 (new boundaries)
Party	Candidate	Votes	%	±%
Liberal	E. F. M. Sutton*	1,893	66.5	
Conservative	T. T. Shann	1,074	37.7	
Majority		819	28.8	
Turnout		2,848	35.9	
Liberal hold		Swing		

==== November 1914 ====
1914
Party	Candidate	Votes	%	±%
Conservative	W. F. Lane-Scott*	uncontested		
Conservative hold		Swing		

==== November 1913 ====
1913
Party	Candidate	Votes	%	±%
Conservative	J. D. Chantler*	uncontested		
Conservative hold		Swing		

==== November 1912 ====
1912
Party	Candidate	Votes	%	±%
Liberal	E. F. M. Susman*	uncontested		
Liberal hold		Swing		

==== November 1911 ====
1911
Party	Candidate	Votes	%	±%
Conservative	W. F. Lane-Scott*	uncontested		
Conservative hold		Swing		

==== June 1911 (by-election) ====
By-election: 27 June 1911
Party	Candidate	Votes	%	±%
Liberal	E. F. M. Susman	1,772	56.0	+8.3
Conservative	C. Phillips	1,392	44.0	−8.3
Majority		380	12.0	
Turnout		3,164		
Liberal gain from Conservative		Swing		

==== November 1910 ====
1910
Party	Candidate	Votes	%	±%
Conservative	J. D. Chantler*	1,729	52.3	−8.4
Liberal	E. F. M. Susman	1,578	47.7	N/A
Majority		151	4.6	−16.8
Turnout		3,307		
Conservative hold		Swing		

=== Elections in 1900s ===
==== November 1909 ====
1909
Party	Candidate	Votes	%	±%
Conservative	G. K. Ashton*	1,739	60.7	N/A
Independent	W. Stanway	1,126	39.3	N/A
Majority		613	21.4	N/A
Turnout		2,865		
Conservative hold		Swing		

==== November 1908 ====
1908
Party	Candidate	Votes	%	±%
Conservative	W. F. Lane-Scott*	uncontested		
Conservative hold		Swing		

==== December 1907 (by-election) ====
By-election: 17 December 1907
Party	Candidate	Votes	%	±%
Conservative	J. D. Chantler	1,453	51.7	N/A
Liberal	J. C. B. Percy	1,356	48.3	N/A
Majority		97	3.4	N/A
Turnout		2,809		
Conservative gain from Liberal		Swing		

==== November 1907 ====
1907
Party	Candidate	Votes	%	±%
Liberal	H. Plummer*	uncontested		
Liberal hold		Swing		

==== November 1906 ====
1906
Party	Candidate	Votes	%	±%
Conservative	G. K. Ashton*	uncontested		
Conservative hold		Swing		

==== November 1905 ====
1905
Party	Candidate	Votes	%	±%
Conservative	W. F. Lane-Scott*	uncontested		
Conservative hold		Swing		

==== November 1904 ====
1904
Party	Candidate	Votes	%	±%
Liberal	H. Plummer*	uncontested		
Liberal hold		Swing		

==== November 1903 ====
1903
Party	Candidate	Votes	%	±%
Conservative	G. K. Ashton*	uncontested		
Conservative hold		Swing		

==== December 1902 (by-election) ====
By-election: 16 June 1903
Party	Candidate	Votes	%	±%
Conservative	W. F. Lane-Scott	uncontested		
Conservative gain from Liberal		Swing		

==== November 1902 ====
1902
Party	Candidate	Votes	%	±%
Liberal	E. Holt*	1,706	56.7	N/A
Conservative	W. Hyde	1,305	43.3	N/A
Majority		401	13.4	N/A
Turnout		3,011		
Liberal hold		Swing		

==== November 1901 ====
1901
Party	Candidate	Votes	%	±%
Liberal	H. Plummer*	uncontested		
Liberal hold		Swing		

==== November 1900 ====
1900
Party	Candidate	Votes	%	±%
Conservative	G. K. Ashton*	uncontested		
Conservative hold		Swing		

=== Elections in 1890s ===
==== November 1899 ====
1899
Party	Candidate	Votes	%	±%
Liberal	E. Holt*	uncontested		
Liberal hold		Swing		

==== November 1898 ====
1898
Party	Candidate	Votes	%	±%
Liberal	H. Plummer*	uncontested		
Liberal hold		Swing		

==== November 1897 ====
1897
Party	Candidate	Votes	%	±%
Conservative	G. K. Ashton	1,310	69.8	N/A
Conservative	F. E. Estcourt*	568	30.2	N/A
Majority		742	39.6	N/A
Turnout		1,878		
Conservative gain from Conservative		Swing		

==== November 1896 ====
1896
Party	Candidate	Votes	%	±%
Liberal	E. Holt*	uncontested		
Liberal hold		Swing		

==== November 1895 ====
1895
Party	Candidate	Votes	%	±%
Liberal	H. Plummer*	uncontested		
Liberal hold		Swing		

==== November 1894 ====
1894
Party	Candidate	Votes	%	±%
Conservative	F. E. Estcourt*	823	53.1	+18.8
Liberal	E. C. Harding	728	46.9	−18.8
Majority		95	6.2	
Turnout		1,551		
Conservative hold		Swing		

==== November 1893 ====
1893
Party	Candidate	Votes	%	±%
Liberal	E. Holt	938	65.7	N/A
Conservative	F. Wallis	489	34.3	−6.0
Majority		447	31.4	
Turnout		1,427		
Liberal gain from Liberal Unionist		Swing		

==== November 1892 ====
1892
Party	Candidate	Votes	%	±%
Independent	H. Plummer	708	59.7	N/A
Conservative	S. Royle*	478	40.3	N/A
Majority		230	19.4	N/A
Turnout		1,186		
Independent gain from Conservative		Swing		

==== November 1891 ====
1891
Party	Candidate	Votes	%	±%
Conservative	F. E. Estcourt*	uncontested		
Conservative hold		Swing		

==== November 1890 ====
1890
Party	Candidate	Votes	%	±%
Liberal Unionist	W. T. Gunson*	uncontested		
Liberal Unionist hold		Swing		

=== Elections in 1880s ===
==== November 1889 ====
1889
Party	Candidate	Votes	%	±%
Conservative	S. Royle*	999	51.5	N/A
Liberal	W. Johnson	942	48.5	N/A
Majority		57	3.0	N/A
Turnout		1,941		
Conservative hold		Swing		

==== November 1888 ====
1888
Party	Candidate	Votes	%	±%
Conservative	F. E. Estcourt*	uncontested		
Conservative hold		Swing		

==== November 1887 ====
1887
Party	Candidate	Votes	%	±%
Liberal Unionist	W. T. Gunson*	uncontested		
Liberal Unionist hold		Swing		

==== November 1886 ====
1886
Party	Candidate	Votes	%	±%
Conservative	S. Royle*	712	62.5	−7.3
Independent	F. Hampson	427	37.5	N/A
Majority		285	25.0	+24.7
Turnout		1,139		
Conservative hold		Swing		

==== November 1885 ====
1885 (3 vacancies)
Party	Candidate	Votes	%	±%
Conservative	F. E. Estcourt	678	69.8	
Liberal	W. T. Gunson	491	50.5	
Conservative	J. Ramsay	441	45.4	
Conservative	S. Royle	438	45.1	
Liberal	S. Jewsbury	382	39.2	
Majority		3	0.3	
Turnout		972		
Conservative win (new seat)				
Liberal win (new seat)				
Conservative win (new seat)				

== See also ==
- Manchester City Council
- Manchester City Council elections
