= 1874 Manchester City Council election =

Local election in Manchester

- 2 November 1874

16 of 64 seats to Manchester City Council 33 seats needed for a majority
	First party	Second party
Party	Liberal	Conservative
Last election	9 seats, 51.3%	7 seats, 47.8%
Seats before	36	28
Seats won	8	8
Seats after	37	27
Seat change	▲1	▼1
Popular vote	9,978	9,406
Percentage	51.5%	48.5%
Swing	▲0.2%	▲0.7%
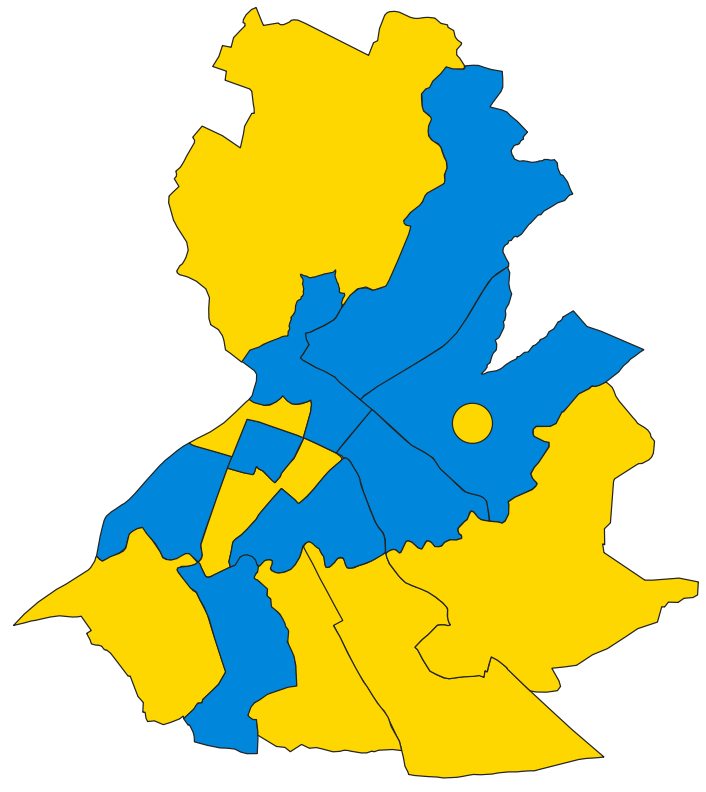
- Map of results of 1874 election
Leader of the Council before election
Liberal
Leader of the Council after election
Liberal

Elections to Manchester City Council were held on Monday, 2 November 1874. One third of the councillors seats were up for election, with each successful candidate to serve a three-year term of office. The Liberal Party retained overall control of the council.

== Election result ==
Party	Votes		Seats			Full Council	
Liberal Party	9,978 (51.5%)	▲0.2	8 (50.0%)	8 / 16	▲1	37 (57.8%)	37 / 64
Conservative Party	9,406 (48.5%)	▲0.7	8 (50.0%)	8 / 16	▼1	27 (42.2%)	27 / 64

=== Full council ===
↓
37	27

=== Aldermen ===
↓
10	6

=== Councillors ===
↓
27	21

== Ward results ==
=== All Saints' ===
All Saints'
Party	Candidate	Votes	%	±%
Liberal	J. Little*	1,058	62.3	+2.8
Conservative	W. Sanderson	641	37.7	−2.8
Majority		417	24.6	+5.6
Turnout		1,699		
Liberal hold		Swing		

=== Ardwick ===
Ardwick
Party	Candidate	Votes	%	±%
Liberal	J. Thompson*	uncontested		
Liberal hold		Swing		

=== Cheetham ===
Cheetham
Party	Candidate	Votes	%	±%
Liberal	J. Ashton*	1,129	52.3	+4.6
Conservative	T. H. Drew	1,028	47.7	−4.6
Majority		101	4.6	
Turnout		2,157		
Liberal hold		Swing		

=== Collegiate Church ===
Collegiate Church
Party	Candidate	Votes	%	±%
Conservative	W. Griffin*	893	57.3	N/A
Liberal	T. Peel	665	42.7	N/A
Majority		228	14.6	N/A
Turnout		1,558		
Conservative hold		Swing		

=== Exchange ===
Exchange
Party	Candidate	Votes	%	±%
Liberal	G. Booth*	382	64.5	+14.5
Conservative	W. Milner	210	35.5	−14.5
Majority		172	29.0	+29.0
Turnout		592		
Liberal hold		Swing		

=== Medlock Street ===
Medlock Street
Party	Candidate	Votes	%	±%
Conservative	J. Craven*	uncontested		
Conservative hold		Swing		

=== New Cross ===
New Cross
Party	Candidate	Votes	%	±%
Conservative	H. Shaw*	uncontested		
Liberal	W. Smith*	uncontested		
Conservative hold		Swing		
Liberal hold		Swing		

=== Oxford ===
Oxford
Party	Candidate	Votes	%	±%
Conservative	S. Ingham*	517	54.2	+2.6
Liberal	M. Hilton	436	45.8	−2.6
Majority		81	8.4	+5.2
Turnout		953		
Conservative hold		Swing		

=== St. Ann's ===
St. Ann's
Party	Candidate	Votes	%	±%
Conservative	J. A. Birch*	482	54.5	+17.8
Liberal	J. Mark	402	45.5	−17.8
Majority		80	9.0	
Turnout		884		
Conservative hold		Swing		

=== St. Clement's ===
St. Clement's
Party	Candidate	Votes	%	±%
Conservative	J. Townsend*	929	50.5	+8.4
Liberal	J. W. Southern	910	49.5	−5.9
Majority		19	1.0	
Turnout		1,839		
Conservative hold		Swing		

=== St. George's ===
St. George's
Party	Candidate	Votes	%	±%
Liberal	W. Mather*	uncontested		
Liberal hold		Swing		

=== St. James' ===
St. James'
Party	Candidate	Votes	%	±%
Liberal	J. Spencer	585	52.7	+3.5
Conservative	R. Lovatt Reade	526	47.5	−3.5
Majority		59	5.4	
Turnout		1,111		
Liberal gain from Conservative		Swing		

=== St. John's ===
St. John's
Party	Candidate	Votes	%	±%
Conservative	N. Kilvert*	744	69.4	+10.4
Liberal	A. Maccollah	328	30.6	−10.4
Majority		416	38.8	+20.8
Turnout		1,072		
Conservative hold		Swing		

=== St. Luke's ===
St. Luke's
Party	Candidate	Votes	%	±%
Liberal	W. Scott Brown	1,437	68.8	N/A
Conservative	J. Bardsley	653	31.2	−54.3
Majority		784	37.6	
Turnout		2,090		
Liberal gain from Conservative		Swing		

=== St. Michael's ===
St. Michael's
Party	Candidate	Votes	%	±%
Conservative	G. Moulton	2,783	51.3	+7.6
Liberal	J. Jackson	2,646	48.7	−4.2
Majority		137	2.6	
Turnout		5,429		
Conservative gain from Liberal		Swing		
