= 1888 Manchester City Council election =

Local election in Manchester

- 1 November 1888

19 of 76 seats to Manchester City Council 39 seats needed for a majority
	First party	Second party	Third party
Party	Conservative	Liberal	Liberal Unionist
Last election	9 seats, 49.3%	9 seats, 50.7%	1 seat, 0.0%
Seats before	33	33	10
Seats won	10	4	5
Seats after	34	32	10
Seat change	▲1	▼1	Steady
Popular vote	3,615	1,815	0
Percentage	62.7%	31.5%	0.0%
Swing	▲13.4%	▼19.2%	Steady
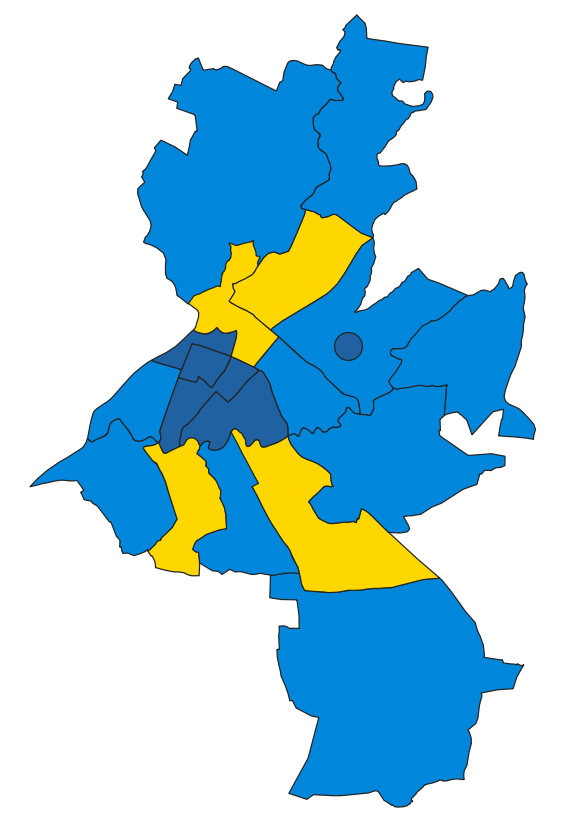
- Map of results of 1888 election
Leader of the Council before election
No overall control
Leader of the Council after election
No overall control

Elections to Manchester City Council were held on Thursday, 1 November 1888. One third of the councillors seats were up for election, with each successful candidate to serve a three-year term of office. The council remained under no overall control.

== Election result ==
Party	Votes		Seats			Full Council	
Conservative Party	3,615 (62.7%)	▲13.4	10 (52.6%)	10 / 19	▲1	34 (44.7%)	34 / 76
Liberal Party	1,815 (31.5%)	▼19.2	4 (21.1%)	4 / 19	▼1	32 (42.1%)	32 / 76
Liberal Unionist	0 (0.0%)	Steady	5 (26.3%)	5 / 19	Steady	10 (13.2%)	10 / 76
Ind. Nationalist	338 (5.9%)	Steady	0 (0.0%)	0 / 19	Steady	0 (0.0%)	0 / 76

=== Full council ===
↓
32	10	34

=== Aldermen ===
↓
10	3	6

=== Councillors ===
↓
22	7	28

== Ward results ==
=== All Saints' ===
All Saints'
Party	Candidate	Votes	%	±%
Conservative	J. Roberts*	uncontested		
Conservative hold		Swing		

=== Ardwick ===
Ardwick
Party	Candidate	Votes	%	±%
Conservative	J. Hinchliffe*	uncontested		
Conservative hold		Swing		

=== Bradford ===
Bradford
Party	Candidate	Votes	%	±%
Conservative	E. Williams*	1,562	76.5	N/A
Ind. Nationalist	F. Chappell	338	16.5	N/A
Liberal	W. Connell	143	7.0	N/A
Majority		1,224	60.0	N/A
Turnout		2,043		
Conservative hold		Swing		

=== Cheetham ===
Cheetham
Party	Candidate	Votes	%	±%
Conservative	J. Hampson	1,223	53.6	N/A
Liberal	W. H. Withingon	1,057	46.4	N/A
Majority		166	7.2	N/A
Turnout		2,280		
Conservative gain from Liberal		Swing		

=== Collegiate Church ===
Collegiate Church
Party	Candidate	Votes	%	±%
Liberal	J. Brooks*	uncontested		
Liberal hold		Swing		

=== Exchange ===
Exchange
Party	Candidate	Votes	%	±%
Liberal Unionist	H. Rawson*	uncontested		
Liberal Unionist hold		Swing		

=== Harpurhey ===
Harpurhey
Party	Candidate	Votes	%	±%
Conservative	G. Needham*	uncontested		
Conservative hold		Swing		

=== Medlock Street ===
Medlock Street
Party	Candidate	Votes	%	±%
Liberal	W. T. Bax*	uncontested		
Liberal hold		Swing		

=== New Cross ===
New Cross
Party	Candidate	Votes	%	±%
Conservative	J. Grantham*	uncontested		
Liberal Unionist	H. C. Pingstone*	uncontested		
Conservative hold		Swing		
Liberal Unionist hold		Swing		

=== Oxford ===
Oxford
Party	Candidate	Votes	%	±%
Liberal Unionist	G. Clay*	uncontested		
Liberal Unionist hold		Swing		

=== Rusholme ===
Rusholme
Party	Candidate	Votes	%	±%
Conservative	F. E. Estcourt*	uncontested		
Conservative hold		Swing		

=== St. Ann's ===
St. Ann's
Party	Candidate	Votes	%	±%
Liberal Unionist	J. Mark*	uncontested		
Liberal Unionist hold		Swing		

=== St. Clement's ===
St. Clement's
Party	Candidate	Votes	%	±%
Conservative	J. H. Andrews*	830	57.4	N/A
Liberal	T. Swindells	615	42.6	N/A
Majority		215	14.8	N/A
Turnout		1,445		
Conservative hold		Swing		

=== St. George's ===
St. George's
Party	Candidate	Votes	%	±%
Conservative	R. Lovatt Reade*	uncontested		
Conservative hold		Swing		

=== St. James' ===
St. James'
Party	Candidate	Votes	%	±%
Liberal Unionist	A. Murray*	uncontested		
Liberal Unionist hold		Swing		

=== St. John's ===
St. John's
Party	Candidate	Votes	%	±%
Conservative	G. Kenworthy*	uncontested		
Conservative hold		Swing		

=== St. Luke's ===
St. Luke's
Party	Candidate	Votes	%	±%
Liberal	J. Hoy*	uncontested		
Liberal hold		Swing		

=== St. Michael's ===
St. Michael's
Party	Candidate	Votes	%	±%
Liberal	C. O'Neill*	uncontested		
Liberal hold		Swing		

== Aldermanic elections ==
=== Aldermanic election, 19 March 1889 ===
Caused by the death on 7 March 1889 of Alderman Philip Goldschmidt (Liberal, elected as an alderman by the council on 7 October 1885).

In his place, Councillor Richard Lovatt Reade (Conservative, St. George's, elected 27 January 1877; previously 1873) was elected as an alderman by the council on 19 March 1889.

Party	Alderman	Ward	Term expires
Conservative	Richard Lovatt Reade	Rusholme	1889

=== Aldermanic election, 30 October 1889 ===
Caused by the death on 19 October 1889 of Alderman John Marsland Bennett (Conservative, elected as an alderman by the council on 9 November 1859).

In his place, Councillor John Mark (Liberal Unionist, St. Ann's, elected 14 August 1877) was elected as an alderman by the council on 30 October 1889.

Party	Alderman	Ward	Term expires
Liberal Unionist	John Mark	St. Ann's	1889

== By-elections between 1888 and 1889 ==
=== St. George's, 1 April 1889 ===
Caused by the election as an alderman of Councillor Richard Lovatt Reade (Conservative, St. George's, elected 27 January 1877; previously 1873) on 19 March 1889 following the death on 7 March 1889 of Alderman Philip Goldschmidt (Liberal, elected as an alderman by the council on 7 October 1885).

St. George's
Party	Candidate	Votes	%	±%
Liberal	J. Norris	2,297	63.0	N/A
Conservative	J. Long	1,351	37.0	N/A
Majority		946	26.0	N/A
Turnout		2,602		
Liberal gain from Conservative		Swing		

=== St. John's, 11 July 1889 ===
Caused by the death of Councillor George Kenworthy (Conservative, St. John's, elected 1 November 1882) on 3 July 1889.

St. John's
Party	Candidate	Votes	%	±%
Conservative	J. Myerscough	uncontested		
Conservative hold		Swing		
