= 1885 Manchester City Council election =

Local election in Manchester

- 2 November 1885

25 of 76 seats to Manchester City Council 39 seats needed for a majority
	First party	Second party
Party	Liberal	Conservative
Last election	8 seats, 44.9%	8 seats, 51.1%
Seats before	39	25
Seats won	13	12
Seats after	42	34
Seat change	▲2	▲7
Popular vote	12,313	13,199
Percentage	46.9%	50.3%
Swing	▲2.0%	▼0.8%
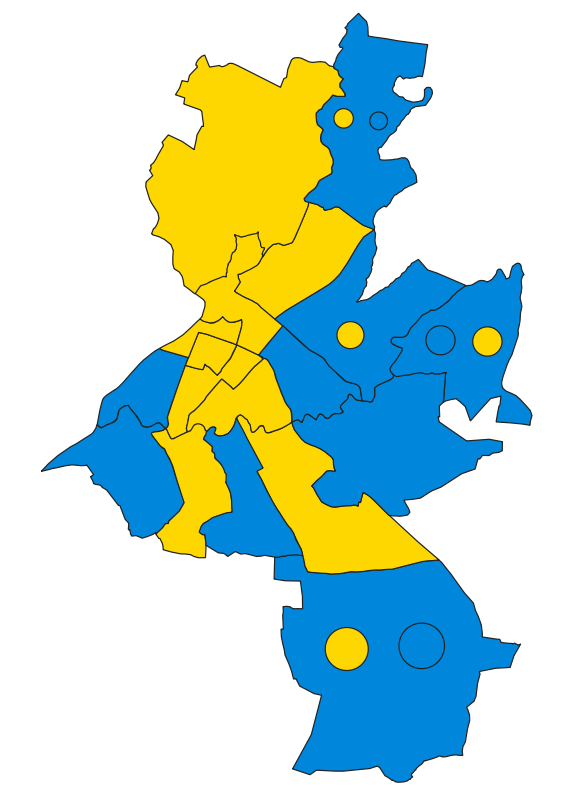
- Map of results of 1885 election
Leader of the Council before election
Liberal
Leader of the Council after election
Liberal

Elections to Manchester City Council were held on Monday, 2 November 1885. One third of the councillors seats were up for election, with each successful candidate to serve a three-year term of office. Owing to the extension of the city's boundaries, three new wards (Bradford, Harpurhey, and Rusholme) elected all of their councillors for the first time.

The Liberal Party retained overall control of the council.

== Election result ==
Party	Votes		Seats			Full Council	
Liberal Party	12,313 (46.9%)	▲2.0	13 (52.0%)	13 / 25	▲2	42 (55.3%)	42 / 76
Conservative Party	13,199 (50.3%)	▼0.8	12 (48.0%)	12 / 25	▲7	34 (44.7%)	34 / 76
Independent Liberal	749 (2.9%)	N/A	0 (0.0%)	0 / 25	N/A	0 (0.0%)	0 / 76

=== Full council ===
↓
42	34

=== Aldermen ===
↓
14	5

=== Councillors ===
↓
28	29

== Ward results ==
=== All Saints' ===
All Saints'
Party	Candidate	Votes	%	±%
Conservative	J. Roberts*	uncontested		
Conservative hold		Swing		

=== Ardwick ===
Ardwick
Party	Candidate	Votes	%	±%
Conservative	J. Hinchliffe*	uncontested		
Conservative hold		Swing		

=== Bradford ===
Bradford (3 vacancies)
Party	Candidate	Votes	%	±%
Conservative	E. Williams	1,538	65.4	
Conservative	J. Tunstall	1,502	63.8	
Liberal	J. Hutt	1,196	50.8	
Liberal	C. Cooper	1,082	46.0	
Liberal	J. Maudsley	991	42.1	
Independent Liberal	R. W. Bird	749	31.8	
Majority		114	4.8	
Turnout		2,353		
Conservative win (new seat)				
Conservative win (new seat)				
Liberal win (new seat)				

=== Cheetham ===
Cheetham
Party	Candidate	Votes	%	±%
Liberal	W. Holt*	1,278	53.3	+23.1
Conservative	S. P. Bidder	1,119	46.7	−23.1
Majority		159	6.6	
Turnout		2,397		
Liberal hold		Swing		

=== Collegiate Church ===
Collegiate Church
Party	Candidate	Votes	%	±%
Liberal	J. Brooks*	uncontested		
Liberal hold		Swing		

=== Exchange ===
Exchange
Party	Candidate	Votes	%	±%
Liberal	H. Rawson*	uncontested		
Liberal hold		Swing		

=== Harpurhey ===
Harpurhey (3 vacancies)
Party	Candidate	Votes	%	±%
Conservative	G. Needham	2,052	60.9	
Liberal	W. Sharratt	1,855	55.0	
Conservative	J. Richards	1,755	52.1	
Conservative	A. Wilkinson	1,601	47.5	
Liberal	J. R. Lancashire	1,507	44.7	
Liberal	T. W. Foxcroft	1,343	39.8	
Majority		154	4.6	
Turnout		3,371		
Conservative win (new seat)				
Liberal win (new seat)				
Conservative win (new seat)				

=== Medlock Street ===
Medlock Street
Party	Candidate	Votes	%	±%
Liberal	A. Evans*	uncontested		
Liberal hold		Swing		

=== New Cross ===
New Cross
Party	Candidate	Votes	%	±%
Conservative	J. Grantham*	uncontested		
Liberal	H. C. Pingstone	uncontested		
Conservative hold		Swing		
Liberal hold		Swing		

=== Oxford ===
Oxford
Party	Candidate	Votes	%	±%
Liberal	G. Clay*	uncontested		
Liberal hold		Swing		

=== Rusholme ===
Rusholme (3 vacancies)
Party	Candidate	Votes	%	±%
Conservative	F. E. Estcourt	678	69.8	
Liberal	W. T. Gunson	491	50.5	
Conservative	J. Ramsay	441	45.4	
Conservative	S. Royle	438	45.1	
Liberal	S. Jewsbury	382	39.2	
Majority		3	0.3	
Turnout		972		
Conservative win (new seat)				
Liberal win (new seat)				
Conservative win (new seat)				

=== St. Ann's ===
St. Ann's
Party	Candidate	Votes	%	±%
Liberal	J. Mark*	uncontested		
Liberal hold		Swing		

=== St. Clement's ===
St. Clement's
Party	Candidate	Votes	%	±%
Conservative	J. H. Andrews	798	52.0	+3.2
Liberal	T. A. Bazley*	737	48.0	−3.2
Majority		61	4.0	
Turnout		1,535		
Conservative gain from Liberal		Swing		

=== St. George's ===
St. George's
Party	Candidate	Votes	%	±%
Conservative	R. Lovatt Reade*	uncontested		
Conservative hold		Swing		

=== St. James' ===
St. James'
Party	Candidate	Votes	%	±%
Liberal	A. Murray*	uncontested		
Liberal hold		Swing		

=== St. John's ===
St. John's
Party	Candidate	Votes	%	±%
Conservative	G. Kenworthy*	uncontested		
Conservative hold		Swing		

=== St. Luke's ===
St. Luke's
Party	Candidate	Votes	%	±%
Liberal	J. Hoy*	uncontested		
Liberal hold		Swing		

=== St. Michael's ===
St. Michael's
Party	Candidate	Votes	%	±%
Liberal	W. Brown*	1,451	53.2	+18.1
Conservative	R. Walker	1,277	46.8	+4.9
Majority		174	6.4	
Turnout		2,728		
Liberal hold		Swing		

== Aldermanic elections ==
=== Aldermanic election, 9 November 1885 ===
Caused by the creation of Bradford, Harpurhey, and Rusholme wards on 1 November 1885, requiring the election of three aldermen by the council.

The following three were elected as aldermen by the council on 9 November 1885.

Party	Alderman	Ward	Term expires
Liberal	William Brown		1889
Conservative	William Griffin	Harpurhey	1886
Conservative	Hugo Shaw	Bradford	1889

=== Aldermanic election, 5 May 1886 ===
Caused by the death on 17 April 1886 of Alderman Sir Thomas Baker (Liberal, elected as an alderman by the council on 3 July 1875).

In his place, Councillor James Craven (Conservative, Medlock Street, elected 1 November 1871; previously 1863-69) was elected as an alderman by the council on 5 May 1886.

Party	Alderman	Ward	Term expires
Conservative	James Craven		1892

=== Aldermanic election, 14 July 1886 ===
Caused by the death on 2 July 1886 of Alderman George Booth (Liberal, elected as an alderman by the council on 28 March 1879).

In his place, Councillor Thomas Rose (Conservative, St. Ann's, elected 16 July 1875) was elected as an alderman by the council on 14 July 1886.

Party	Alderman	Ward	Term expires
Conservative	Thomas Rose		1889

== By-elections between 1885 and 1886 ==
=== St. Michael's, 17 November 1885 ===
Caused by the election as an alderman of Councillor William Brown (Liberal, St. Michael's, elected 1 November 1870) on 9 November 1885, following the creation of Rusholme ward on 1 November 1885, requiring the election of an alderman by the council.

St. Michael's
Party	Candidate	Votes	%	±%
Liberal	C. O'Neill	uncontested		
Liberal hold		Swing		

=== By-elections, 25 November 1885 ===
Two by-elections were held on 25 November 1885 to fill vacancies that were created by the appointment of aldermen on 9 November 1885.

==== Collegiate Church ====
Caused by the election as an alderman of Councillor William Griffin (Conservative, Collegiate Church, elected 1 November 1871) on 9 November 1885, following the creation of Harpurhey ward on 1 November 1885, requiring the election of an alderman by the council.

Collegiate Church
Party	Candidate	Votes	%	±%
Conservative	C. Griffin	797	58.4	N/A
Liberal	J. Ashworth	568	41.6	N/A
Majority		229	16.8	N/A
Turnout		1,365		
Conservative hold		Swing		

==== New Cross ====
Caused by the election as an alderman of Councillor Hugo Shaw (Conservative, New Cross, elected 1 November 1871) on 9 November 1885, following the creation of Bradford ward on 1 November 1885, requiring the election of an alderman by the council.

New Cross
Party	Candidate	Votes	%	±%
Conservative	S. Redfern	1,999	61.0	N/A
Independent	T. Nolan	1,277	39.0	N/A
Majority		723	22.0	N/A
Turnout		3,276		
Conservative hold		Swing		

=== Medlock Street, 19 May 1886 ===
Caused by the election as an alderman of Councillor James Craven (Conservative, Medlock Street, elected 1 November 1871; previously 1863-69) on 5 May 1886 following the death on 17 April 1886 of Alderman Sir Thomas Baker (Liberal, elected as an alderman by the council on 3 July 1875).

Medlock Street
Party	Candidate	Votes	%	±%
Conservative	H. H. Mainwaring	1,160	53.3	N/A
Liberal	S. C. Richardson	1,015	46.7	N/A
Majority		145	6.6	N/A
Turnout		2,175		
Conservative hold		Swing		

=== St. Ann's, 19 July 1886 ===
Caused by the election as an alderman of Councillor Thomas Rose (Conservative, St. Ann's, elected 16 July 1875) on 14 July 1886 following the death on 2 July 1886 of Alderman George Booth (Liberal, elected as an alderman by the council on 28 March 1879).

St. Ann's
Party	Candidate	Votes	%	±%
Conservative	A. G. Copeland	uncontested		
Conservative hold		Swing		
