= 1899 Manchester City Council election =

Local election in Manchester

- 1 November 1899

26 of 104 seats to Manchester City Council 53 seats needed for a majority
	First party	Second party	Third party
Party	Conservative	Liberal	Ind. Labour Party
Last election	11 seats, 50.2%	14 seats, 34.6%	1 seats, 13.0%
Seats before	49	46	3
Seats won	18	8	0
Seats after	50	46	3
Seat change	▲1	Steady	Steady
Popular vote	15,192	11,817	2,440
Percentage	51.1%	39.7%	8.2%
Swing	▲0.9%	▲5.1%	▼4.8%
	Fourth party	Fifth party	Sixth party
Party	Liberal Unionist	Independent	Social Democratic Federation
Last election	0 seats, 0.0%	0 seats, 2.2%	0 seats, 0.0%
Seats before	4	1	1
Seats won	0	0	0
Seats after	3	1	1
Seat change	▼1	Steady	Steady
Popular vote	0	290	0
Percentage	0.0%	1.0%	0.0%
Swing	Steady	▼1.2%	Steady
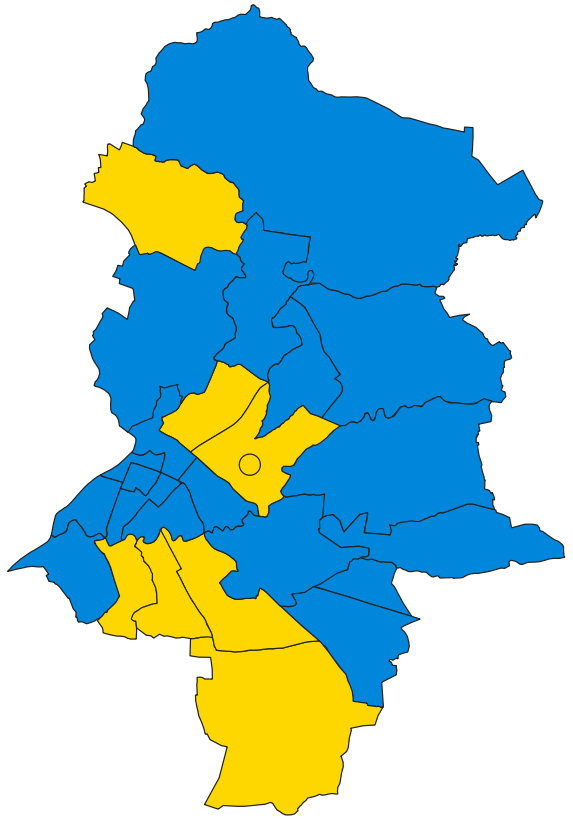
- Map of results of 1899 election
Leader of the Council before election
No overall control
Leader of the Council after election
No overall control

Elections to Manchester City Council were held on Wednesday, 1 November 1899. One third of the councillors seats were up for election, with each successful candidate to serve a three-year term of office. The council remained under no overall control.

== Election result ==
Party	Votes		Seats			Full Council	
Conservative Party	15,192 (51.1%)	▲0.9	18 (69.2%)	18 / 26	▲1	50 (48.1%)	50 / 104
Liberal Party	11,817 (39.7%)	▲5.1	8 (30.8%)	8 / 26	Steady	46 (44.2%)	46 / 104
Ind. Labour Party	2,440 (8.2%)	▼4.8	0 (0.0%)	0 / 26	Steady	3 (2.9%)	3 / 104
Liberal Unionist	0 (0.0%)	Steady	0 (0.0%)	0 / 26	▼1	3 (2.9%)	3 / 104
Independent	290 (1.0%)	▼1.2	0 (0.0%)	0 / 26	Steady	1 (1.0%)	1 / 104
Social Democratic Federation	0 (0.0%)	Steady	0 (0.0%)	0 / 26	Steady	1 (1.0%)	1 / 104

=== Full council ===
↓
1	3	46	1	3	50

=== Aldermen ===
↓
15	3	8

=== Councillors ===
↓
1	3	31	1	42

== Ward results ==
=== All Saints' ===
All Saints'
Party	Candidate	Votes	%	±%
Liberal	W. B. Pritchard*	uncontested		
Liberal hold		Swing		

=== Ardwick ===
Ardwick
Party	Candidate	Votes	%	±%
Conservative	W. Pollitt*	1,771	57.9	N/A
Liberal	W. M. Westerby	1,286	42.1	N/A
Majority		485	15.8	N/A
Turnout		3,057		
Conservative hold		Swing		

=== Blackley and Moston ===
Blackley and Moston
Party	Candidate	Votes	%	±%
Conservative	J. E. Ogden*	uncontested		
Conservative hold		Swing		

=== Bradford ===
Bradford
Party	Candidate	Votes	%	±%
Conservative	C. Dreyfus*	uncontested		
Conservative hold		Swing		

=== Cheetham ===
Cheetham
Party	Candidate	Votes	%	±%
Conservative	C. H. Braddon*	1,127	79.5	N/A
Independent	H. Benoliel	290	20.5	−15.9
Majority		837	59.0	
Turnout		1,417		
Conservative hold		Swing		

=== Collegiate Church ===
Collegiate Church
Party	Candidate	Votes	%	±%
Conservative	J. Lowry	512	44.3	N/A
Liberal	H. Whitehouse	380	32.8	N/A
Conservative	J. Makeague	265	22.9	N/A
Majority		132	11.5	N/A
Turnout		1,157		
Conservative gain from Liberal		Swing		

=== Crumpsall ===
Crumpsall
Party	Candidate	Votes	%	±%
Liberal	W. Bradley*	uncontested		
Liberal hold		Swing		

=== Exchange ===
Exchange
Party	Candidate	Votes	%	±%
Conservative	T. Smethurst*	uncontested		
Conservative hold		Swing		

=== Harpurhey ===
Harpurhey
Party	Candidate	Votes	%	±%
Conservative	J. Faulkner	1,615	44.1	+2.5
Ind. Labour Party	T. Cook	1,201	32.8	N/A
Liberal	H. Noble	843	23.0	−32.9
Majority		414	11.4	
Turnout		3,659		
Conservative hold		Swing		

=== Longsight ===
Longsight
Party	Candidate	Votes	%	±%
Conservative	C. Jennison*	991	62.5	N/A
Liberal	D. Armstrong	595	37.5	N/A
Majority		396	25.0	N/A
Turnout		1,586		
Conservative hold		Swing		

=== Medlock Street ===
Medlock Street
Party	Candidate	Votes	%	±%
Liberal	J. D. Pennington	1,517	59.5	N/A
Conservative	J. Fielding	1,034	40.5	N/A
Majority		483	19.0	N/A
Turnout		2,551		
Liberal gain from Liberal Unionist		Swing		

=== Miles Platting ===
Miles Platting
Party	Candidate	Votes	%	±%
Conservative	T. Milnes*	uncontested		
Conservative hold		Swing		

=== New Cross ===
New Cross
Party	Candidate	Votes	%	±%
Liberal	R. Bishop*	2,505	59.3	+8.7
Liberal	M. Grimshaw	2,162	51.2	+0.6
Conservative	W. Holland*	1,897	44.9	−12.0
Conservative	I. Barnes	1,885	44.6	−12.3
Majority		265	6.3	+2.5
Turnout		4,225		
Liberal hold		Swing		
Liberal gain from Conservative		Swing		

=== Newton Heath ===
Newton Heath
Party	Candidate	Votes	%	±%
Conservative	W. T. Rothwell*	uncontested		
Conservative hold		Swing		

=== Openshaw ===
Openshaw
Party	Candidate	Votes	%	±%
Conservative	J. Johnson	1,317	59.4	−0.6
Ind. Labour Party	R. Macdonald	901	40.6	+0.6
Majority		416	18.8	−1.2
Turnout		2,218		
Conservative hold		Swing		

=== Oxford ===
Oxford
Party	Candidate	Votes	%	±%
Conservative	J. J. Lambert*	uncontested		
Conservative hold		Swing		

=== Rusholme ===
Rusholme
Party	Candidate	Votes	%	±%
Liberal	E. Holt*	uncontested		
Liberal hold		Swing		

=== St. Ann's ===
St. Ann's
Party	Candidate	Votes	%	±%
Conservative	C. W. Botsford*	uncontested		
Conservative hold		Swing		

=== St. Clement's ===
St. Clement's
Party	Candidate	Votes	%	±%
Conservative	J. B. Langley*	713	54.3	−6.1
Liberal	R. Torkington	600	45.7	+6.1
Majority		113	8.6	−12.2
Turnout		1,313		
Conservative hold		Swing		

=== St. George's ===
St. George's
Party	Candidate	Votes	%	±%
Conservative	R. A. S. Daly*	1,336	50.1	+4.8
Liberal	F. W. Maxwell	1,333	49.9	N/A
Majority		3	0.2	
Turnout		2,669		
Conservative hold		Swing		

=== St. James' ===
St. James'
Party	Candidate	Votes	%	±%
Conservative	H. Samson*	uncontested		
Conservative hold		Swing		

=== St. John's ===
St. John's
Party	Candidate	Votes	%	±%
Conservative	T. Watmough	uncontested		
Conservative gain from Liberal		Swing		

=== St. Luke's ===
St. Luke's
Party	Candidate	Votes	%	±%
Liberal	H. Marsden*	uncontested		
Liberal hold		Swing		

=== St. Mark's ===
St. Mark's
Party	Candidate	Votes	%	±%
Conservative	J. Phythian*	729	43.8	−30.8
Liberal	J. Allison	596	35.8	N/A
Ind. Labour Party	G. Gregory	338	20.4	−5.0
Majority		133	8.0	−41.2
Turnout		1,663		
Conservative hold		Swing		

=== St. Michael's ===
St. Michael's
Party	Candidate	Votes	%	±%
Liberal	J. H. Wells*	uncontested		
Liberal hold		Swing		
