= Herbert Brierley =

English footballer

Herbert Brearley
Personal information
- Full name: Herbert James Brearley
- Place of birth: England
- Position: Winger

Senior career*
Years	Team	Apps	(Gls)
1898	Burnley	2	(0)
- * Club domestic league appearances and goals

Herbert James Brearley was an English professional footballer who played as a winger for Burnley. He played two matches during the 1898–99 season.
