= Brierly Brook =

Community in Nova Scotia, Canada

Coordinates: 45°35′54.01″N 62°3′41.9″W

Brierly Brook in Nova Scotia

Brierly Brook (Scottish Gaelic: Allt a' Bhrierlidh) is a community in the Canadian province of Nova Scotia, located in Antigonish County. It is named after John Brierly (Briley, Brearly), an early settler, and former soldier who arrived in the area with Lt. Colonel Timothy Hierlihy.
