= George Wilson (reformer) =

English political activist (1808–1870)

George Wilson (1808–1870) was an English political activist, known as chairman of the Anti-Cornlaw League.

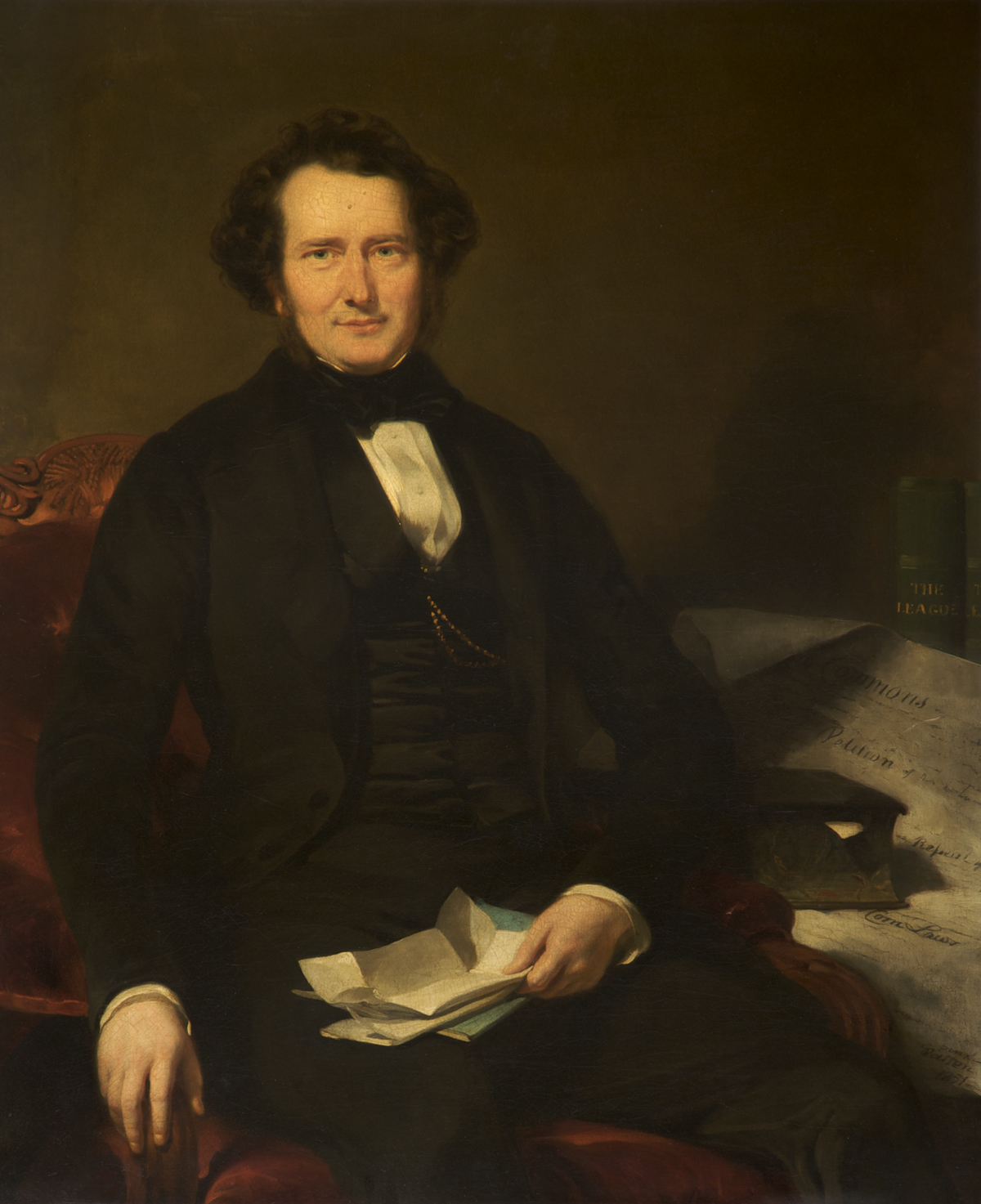
George Wilson

== Life ==
Born at Hathersage, Derbyshire, on 24 April 1808, he was the son of John Wilson, a corn miller, who moved in 1819 to Manchester, as a corn merchant. He was educated at the Manchester commercial school and at evening classes, and was at one time a pupil of John Dalton.

Wilson started business in the corn trade, and then became a starch and gum manufacturer. Most of his working life was taken up with political and railway work. He was, when young, president of the Manchester Phrenological Society, and an occasional writer for the press. He was secretary to the committee which obtained the charter of incorporation for Manchester in 1839, and sat as a member of the town council from 1841 to 1844. On the foundation of the Anti-Cornlaw Association in January 1839, he became a member of the executive committee, and in 1841, when the title was changed to that of the Anti-Cornlaw League, he was elected chairman, and occupied that position until the repeal of the corn laws, of February 1846.

During those five years Wilson presided over the largest British public meetings held up to that time, to agitate constitutionally for a change in the law. When the League was dissolved, its council of presented him with £10,000 in recognition of his political work. The great bazaars in aid of the cause in Manchester and London were due to him.

In 1852, when Lord Derby's government proposed to reimpose a "moderate" duty on corn, the League, revived under Wilson's guidance, disposed of the protectionist proposal in a short campaign. He subsequently turned his attention to parliamentary reform, particularly to redistribution of seats. He kept the question in the front at the numerous public meetings and reform conferences at which he presided, became chairman of the Lancashire Reformers' Union in 1858, and in 1864 was appointed president of the National Reform Union. He took an active part in the Union for the rest of his life.

Wilson was often asked to stand for parliament, but never did. He was as director of the Electric Telegraph Company, and with Joseph Adshead he established the Manchester Night Asylum. In 1847 he joined the board of directors of the Manchester and Leeds Railway, and was deputy-chairman in 1848. In 1860 he became managing director and deputy-chairman of the Lancashire and Yorkshire Railway Company. In 1867 he was appointed chairman.

Wilson died suddenly on 29 December 1870 on a train, and was interred in Ardwick cemetery, Manchester. He attended a Sandemanian chapel, but was tolerant in his religious views.

== Family ==
Wilson married, in 1837, Mary, daughter of John Rawson, merchant and manufacturer, of Manchester, by whom he had seven children.

== Notes ==
Attribution

This article incorporates text from a publication now in the public domain: Lee, Sidney, ed. (1900). "Wilson, George (1808-1870)". Dictionary of National Biography. Vol. 62. London: Smith, Elder & Co.
