= Benjamin Brierley =

English weaver and journalist (1825–1896)

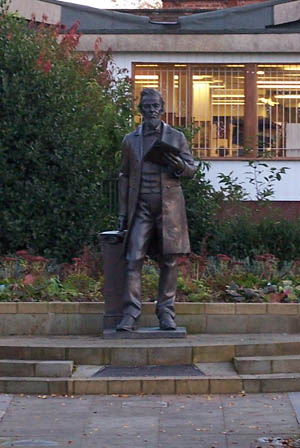
- Ben Brierley statue, erected in 2006 in Failsworth
- Born: 26 June 1825; Failsworth, Lancashire, England
- Died: 11 January 1896 "The Poplars", Moston Vale, Moston, Manchester
- Resting place: Manchester General (Harpurhey) Cemetery
- Writing career
- Language: English
- Notable work: Chronicles of Waverlow

Benjamin Brierley (often known as Ben Brierley) (26 June 1825 – 18 January 1896) was an English weaver, who took up writing in Lancashire dialect. He became a prolific journalist.

== Life ==
He was born in the Rocks area of Failsworth, Lancashire, the son of James Brierley (born 1795), hand-loom weaver, and his wife, Esther Whitehead (died 1854). He started life in a textile factory, educating himself in his spare time. At about the age of thirty he began to contribute articles to local papers, and the republication of some of his sketches of Lancashire character in A Summer Day in Daisy Nook (1859) attracted attention.

In 1863 he definitely took to journalism and literature, publishing in the same year his Chronicles of Waverlow, and in 1864 a long story called The Layrock of Langley Side (afterwards dramatised), followed by others. In April 1869 Brierley began the publication of Ben Brierley's Journal, first as a monthly and afterwards as a weekly magazine. The fifth number sold 13,000 copies. He continued to edit this until December 1891, when it ceased to appear.

In 1875, Brierley was elected a member of Manchester City Council and served six years. In 1880, he paid a short visit to America and in 1884 a longer one, and embodied his impressions in his Ab-o'th'-Yate in America. He gave public readings from his own writings, and his various Ab-o'th'-Yate sketches (about America, London, etc.), and his pictures of Lancashire common life, were very popular, and were collected after his death. Having lost his savings through the failure of a building society in 1884, on 16 March 1885 he was presented with £650. A few years afterwards, when his health failed, a grant of £150 from the royal bounty fund was obtained for him. A further testimonial and the sum of £356 were presented to him on 29 October 1892.

He died on 18 January 1896. Ben Brierley's grave is in Manchester General (Harpurhey) Cemetery, Rochdale Road. On 30 April 1898, a statue in John Cassidy's honour, raised by public subscription, was unveiled at Queen's Park, Harpurhey, by George Milner, President of the Manchester Literary Club.

Today, Brierley is remembered in a 2006 bronze statue by Denise Dutton outside the public library, near his birthplace in the Rocks area of Failsworth. A local pub, the Ben Brierley at Moston, was named after him, but has long since closed. The building now houses the Ben Brierley Legal Advice Resource Centre.

== Partial bibliography ==
- Chronicles of Waverlow, 1863
- The Layrock of Langley-side: a Lancashire Story, 1864 (Google Books)
- Irkdale, or, the Odd House in the Hollow: a Lancashire Story, 1865
- Traddlepin Fold; and Other Tales, 1867
- Red Windows Hall; a Lancashire Story, 1868
- Ab-o'th' Yate in London: or, Southern Life from a Northern Point of View, 1881
- Ab-o'th'-Yate in Paddy's Land: From his Own Goose-wing, 1881
- Ab-o'th'-Yate in Yankeeland: the Results of Two Trips to America, 1885 (Google Books)
- Tales and Sketches of Lancashire Life, 1886
- Cotters of Mossburn, 1886
- Spring Blossoms and Autumn Leaves, 1893

== See also ==
- Edwin Waugh
- John Collier (caricaturist)
