= Richard Potter (British politician) =

British politician

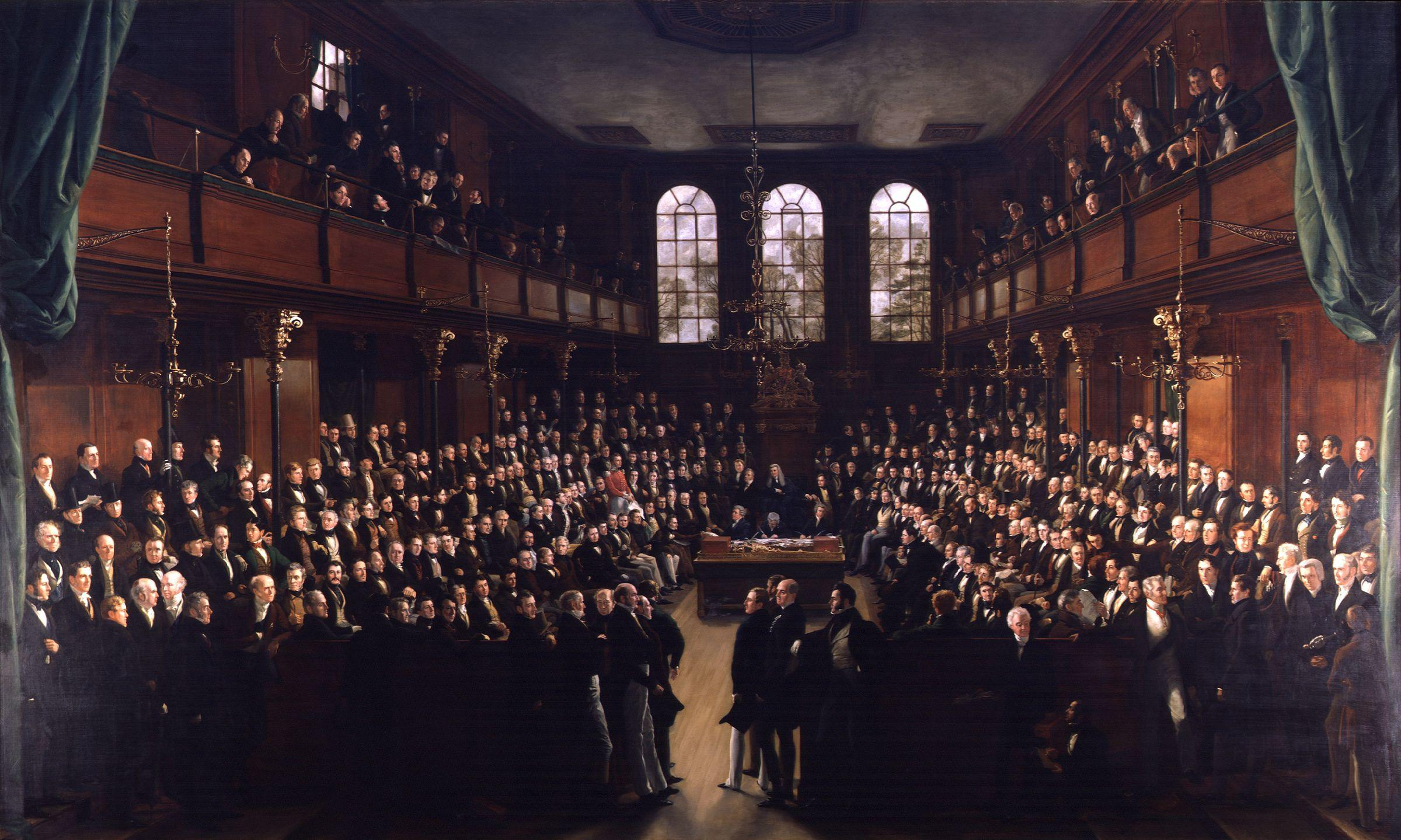

Richard Potter (1778–1842) was an English radical non-conformist Liberal Party MP for Wigan, and a founding member of the Little Circle which was key in gaining the Reform Act 1832.

== Early life ==
The fifth and youngest son of John Potter (1728–1802), Richard Potter was born on 31 January 1778, in Tadcaster, Yorkshire and he died on 13 July 1842, in Penzance, Cornwall.

His father, John Potter, was born on 7 December 1728 in Tadcaster and died there on 28 November 1802. He is buried in grave 40655 at St Mary the Virgin's Church in Tadcaster. He worked as a journeyman in London and on the death of his father, also John Potter born 1691, on 16 June 1758, and his mother, Anne, on 2 May 1762, he succeeded to their draper's shop in Tadcaster. He took a farm at Wighill where he dealt in sheep and wool. On 23 December 1785 an indenture was made for the lease of Wingate Hill Farm between Sir Walter Vavasour and John Potter "The produce of it (Wingate Hill Farm) having been successively on the advance, his shop, too, having been conducted by his wife and children, all his concerns prospered, and enabled him to set two of his sons (William and Richard) up in Manchester at the beginning of this year (1802) with a capital possessed by few beginners (£14,000). And he died worth twelve thousand pounds, which, on the death of his spouse, he left equally to his sons and daughters."

William and Richard Potter opened a warehouse in Manchester at 5 Cannon Street, and a few months later they were joined by Thomas. The firm of William, Thomas and Richard Potter was established on 1 January 1803. William stood down from the business in 1806 when it became Thomas and Richard Potter.

== First Little Circle ==
The Potter family were wealthy Unitarians who were members of Cross Street Chapel and the Portico Library, and were concerned with the welfare of the poor. Thomas and Richard Potter became concerned with unfair representation of the people in parliament in rapidly expanding industrialised towns in the Victorian era, such as Birmingham, Leeds, Manchester and Salford, and decided to form a group to promote change.

In 1815, the first Little Circle was formed, around a core of members from the Cross Street Chapel who were influenced by the ideas of Jeremy Bentham and Joseph Priestley. The founding members included John Edward Taylor (cotton merchant), Joseph Brotherton (a non-conformist minister and pioneering vegetarian), Thomas Preston, and Thomas and Richard Potter. Meetings were held in a room at the back of the Potters' Cannon Street counting-house, generally known as the "plotting-parlour", and its core membership was Unitarian. Group member Archibald Prentice (later editor of the Manchester Times) called them the "Little Circle"; other members were John Shuttleworth (industrialist and municipal reformer); Absalom Watkin (parliamentary reformer and anti corn law campaigner); and William Cowdroy Jnr (editor of the Manchester Gazette).

After group members witnessed the Peterloo Massacre in 1819, and the closure of the liberal Manchester Observer by successive police prosecutions, they decided the time was right to advance their liberalist agenda. In 1820, Brotherton, Shuttleworth and Thomas Potter founded the Manchester Chamber of Commerce. In the following year, the group supported John Edward Taylor in founding the liberal newspaper the Manchester Guardian, to which they all contributed. Published by law only once a week, Taylor continued to edit the newspaper until his death.

== Business career ==
Whilst Richard applied himself almost exclusively to political movements and reform, becoming Member of Parliament for Wigan in 1830, his brother Thomas was left in more or less sole charge of the management of the warehouse. It developed into the largest concern of its type in Manchester.

== Second Little Circle ==
In 1821, 12 merchants met in Thomas and Richard Potter's "plotting parlour" in Cannon Street, and began a fund to support the Manchester Guardian. Seven were Unitarians, including five from the Cross Street Chapel: Thomas and Richard Potter, Abasolm Watkin, Mark Philips, John Shuttleworth, John Benjamin Smith, brothers Edward and William Baxter (all cotton merchants), Fenton Atkinson (prominent Manchester attorney), William Harvey and John Edward Taylor.

The group supported social reform issues discreetly: Taylor survived a trial for libel; Shuttleworth organised the defence of plebeian reformers accused of administering an illegal oath. The group initially proposed that the seats of rotten boroughs convicted of gross electoral corruption should be transferred to industrial towns, citing and later targeting example boroughs including Penryn and East Retford. But when Parliament refused to take action, in 1831 Absalom Watkin was tasked with drawing up a petition asking the government to grant Manchester two Members of Parliament. As a result, Parliament passed the Reform Act 1832, and the group gave Manchester its first two post-reform MPs: Mark Philips and Charles Poulett Thomson. Richard was elected MP for Wigan in 1832, holding the seat until 1839.

== Political career and later life ==
As a result, Parliament passed the Reform Act 1832, and the group gave Manchester its first two post-reform MPs: Mark Philips and Charles Poulett Thomson. While his brother Thomas The brothers continued to run the family business and became more involved in the business life of Manchester. Richard moved into a political career.

Elected MP for Wigan in 1832, he held the seat until 1839, replaced by the Radical party's William Ewart. He moved to Gloucester, where he lost the contest to represent the Whig party in the constituency to Maurice Berkeley, 1st Baron FitzHardinge.

== Personal life ==
Potter married Mary Seddon, daughter of William Seddon, on 25 September 1814. They had five children, including a son, Richard (1817–1892), who became chairman of the Great Western Railway and president of the Grand Trunk Railway, Canada; and a daughter Sarah Anne (1822–1846) who married Talavera Vernon Anson, an officer of the Royal Navy, and had two sons.

Richard Potter died in July 1842, aged 64 in Penzance, Cornwall.
