= Absalom Watkin =

English businessman and reformer

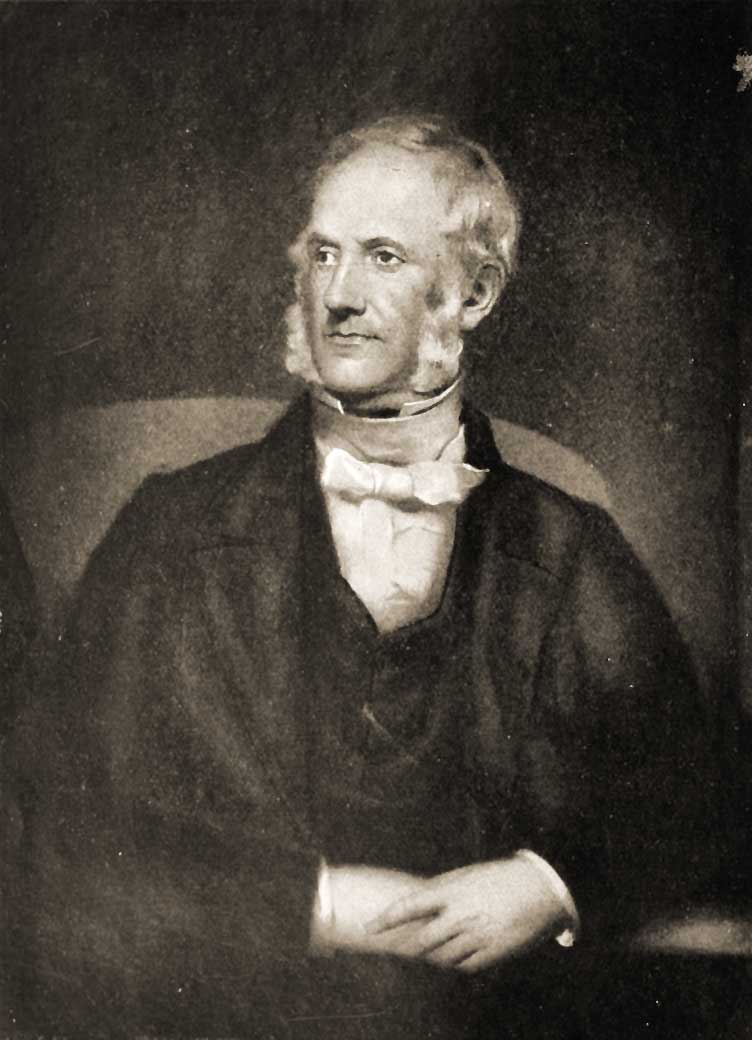
Portrait of Absalom Watkin by William Bradley

Absalom Watkin (1787–1861), was an English social and political reformer, an anti corn law campaigner, and a member of Manchester's Little Circle that was key in passing the Reform Act 1832.

== Early life ==
Absalom Watkin was born in London to an Inn keeper. After his father died, the 14-year old Absalom was sent to live with and work for his uncle, John Watkin, who was a cotton and calico merchant with a small weaving and finishing business. Fours years later, John sold the business and the new owner, Thomas Smith, retained Absalom as the factory manager. By 1807, he had raised enough money to buy Smith out of the business, on the back of which Absalom became rich.

== First Little Circle ==
In 1815, Absalom joined cotton merchant John Potter's political reform group, which group member Archibald Prentice (later editor of the Manchester Times) called the "Little Circle". Strongly influenced by the ideas of Jeremy Bentham and Joseph Priestley, they objected to a political representation system that denied booming industrial cities such as Birmingham, Leeds and Manchester proportionate representation in the House of Commons. With its core membership based around the Unitarians and the Portico Library, members included: John Potter and his three sons Thomas (later first mayor of Manchester), Richard (later MP for Wigan) and William; Joseph Brotherton (Non-conformist minister and pioneering vegetarian); John Edward Taylor (cotton merchant); John Shuttleworth (industrialist and municipal reformer); and William Cowdroy Jnr (editor of the Manchester Gazette). All members held Non-conformist religious views, and like other members of the group, Absalom was an advocate of religious toleration. Absalom himself was a Methodist, and a supporter of non-conformist Joseph Lancaster, even financially supporting the non-conformist school that Lancaster opened in Manchester in 1813.

He was elected to membership of the Manchester Literary and Philosophical Society on 24 January 1823.

== Peterloo Massacre ==
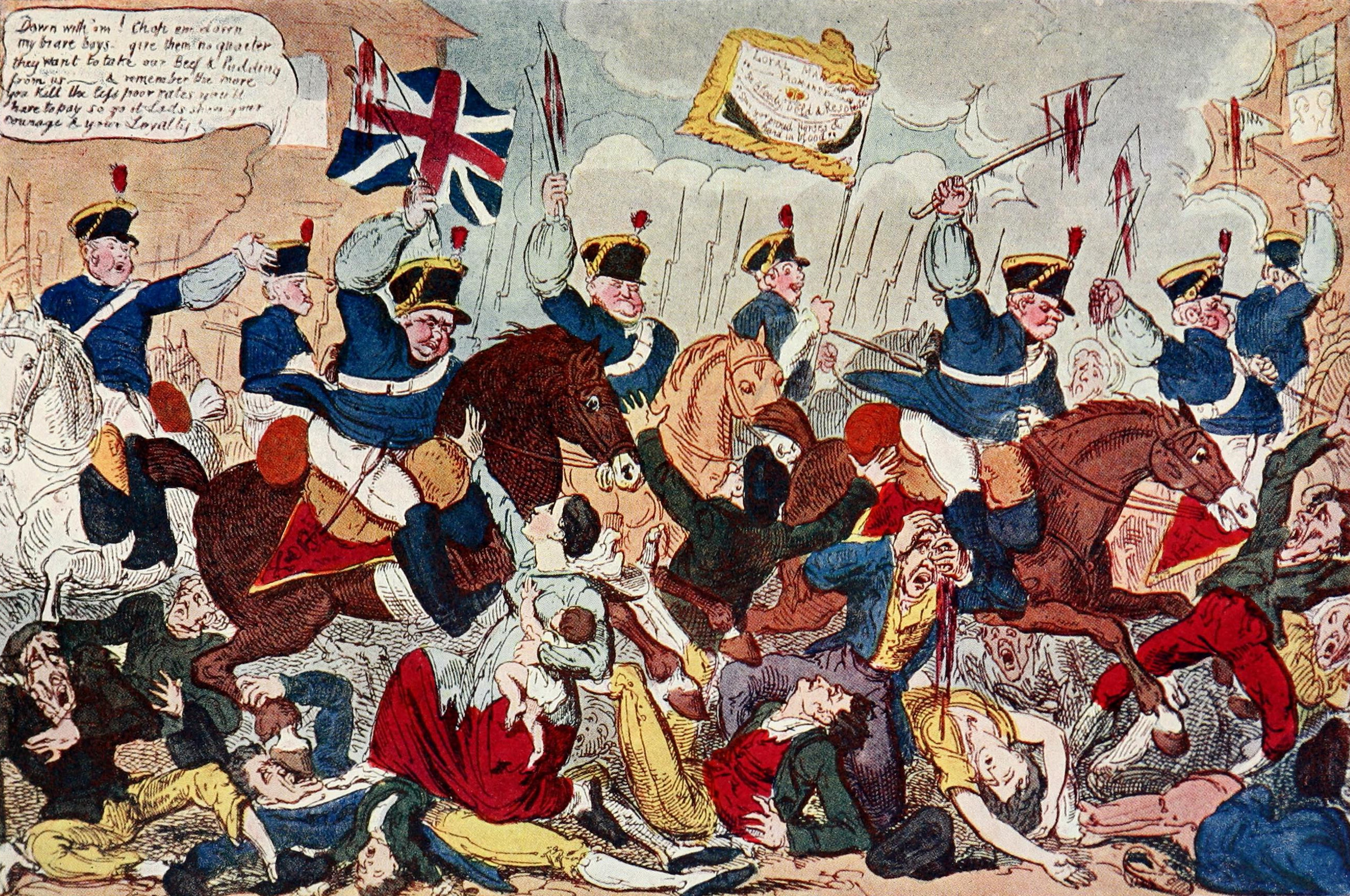
The Peterloo Massacre of 1819

Watkin, like other fellow members of the Little Circle, had been contributing occasional articles, some even regular columns, for Cowdroy's Manchester Gazette. This was a non-Tory non-conformist paper, but moderate in its views compared to the recently created Manchester Observer. In 1819 that paper invited Henry "Orator" Hunt to attend a public meeting regarding electoral reform, the outcome of which led Manchester Observer editor James Wroe to coin the term Peterloo Massacre.

Watkin did not attend the rally, but in line with his fellow members of the Little Circle he pressed for an independent public inquiry into the tragedy, which was refused. He then drew up a petition demanding an inquiry; although it was signed by over 5,000 Mancunians, it also met with refusal.

As a result, after repeated police raids closed down the Manchester Observer, in 1821 Watkin and his fellows in the Little Circle backed then cotton merchant John Edward Taylor to found the moderate conformist Manchester Guardian newspaper (today Guardian national newspaper), which Taylor edited for the rest of his life. Watkin was also introduced by his friend Joseph Johnson to the radical journalist, Richard Carlile. In December 1827, Potter and Shuttleworth suggested that Watkin should take over editorship of the now radicalised Manchester Gazette from Archibald Prentice, but he declined the offer.

== Second Little Circle ==
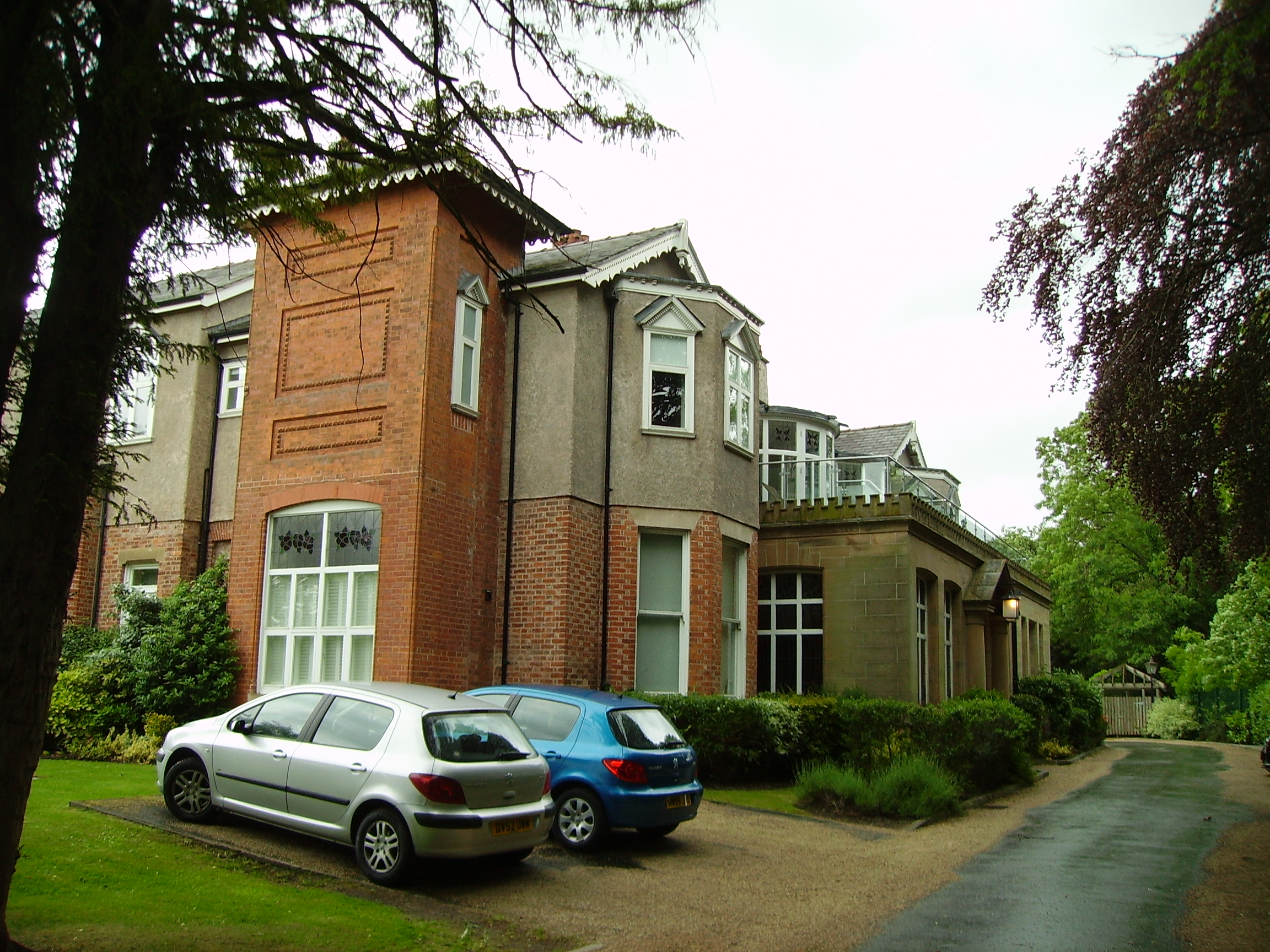
Rose Hill, Northenden, purchased by Watkin in 1832

After the death of John Potter, from 1830 a second group of eleven local Manchester business people began to meet at the Cannon Street warehouse of Potters trading company. Seven were Unitarians, including five from the Cross Street Chapel: Thomas and Richard Potter; Abasolm Watkin; Mark Philips, John Shuttleworth, John Benjamin Smith, and brothers Edward and William Baxter (all cotton merchants); Fenton Atkinson (prominent Manchester attorney); William Harvey; John Edward Taylor.

The group supported various social reform issues closely but discreetly: Taylor survived a trial for libel; Shuttleworth organised the defence of plebeian reformers accused of administering an illegal oath.

The group initially proposed that the seats of rotten boroughs convicted of gross electoral corruption should be transferred to industrial towns, citing and later targeting example boroughs including Penryn and East Retford. But when Parliament refused to take action, in 1831 Absalom was given the task of drawing up the petition asking the government to grant Manchester two members of parliament. As a result, Parliament passed the Reform Act 1832, and the group gave Manchester its first two post-reform MPs: Mark Philips and Charles Poulett Thomson. Two other members also became MPs in 1832: Joseph Brotherton (Salford) and Richard Potter (Wigan).

== Later life ==
Although Watkin had been in conflict with the radical John Fielden over parliamentary reform, he agreed with Fielden's views on factory legislation. In 1833, Absalom organised the campaign in Manchester for the Ten Hours Bill.

In 1840 Absalom became Vice-President of Manchester's Anti-Corn Law League. However, he was strongly opposed to the Chartist campaign, and in August 1842 helped the police to defend Manchester from rioters demanding universal suffrage.

== Personal life ==
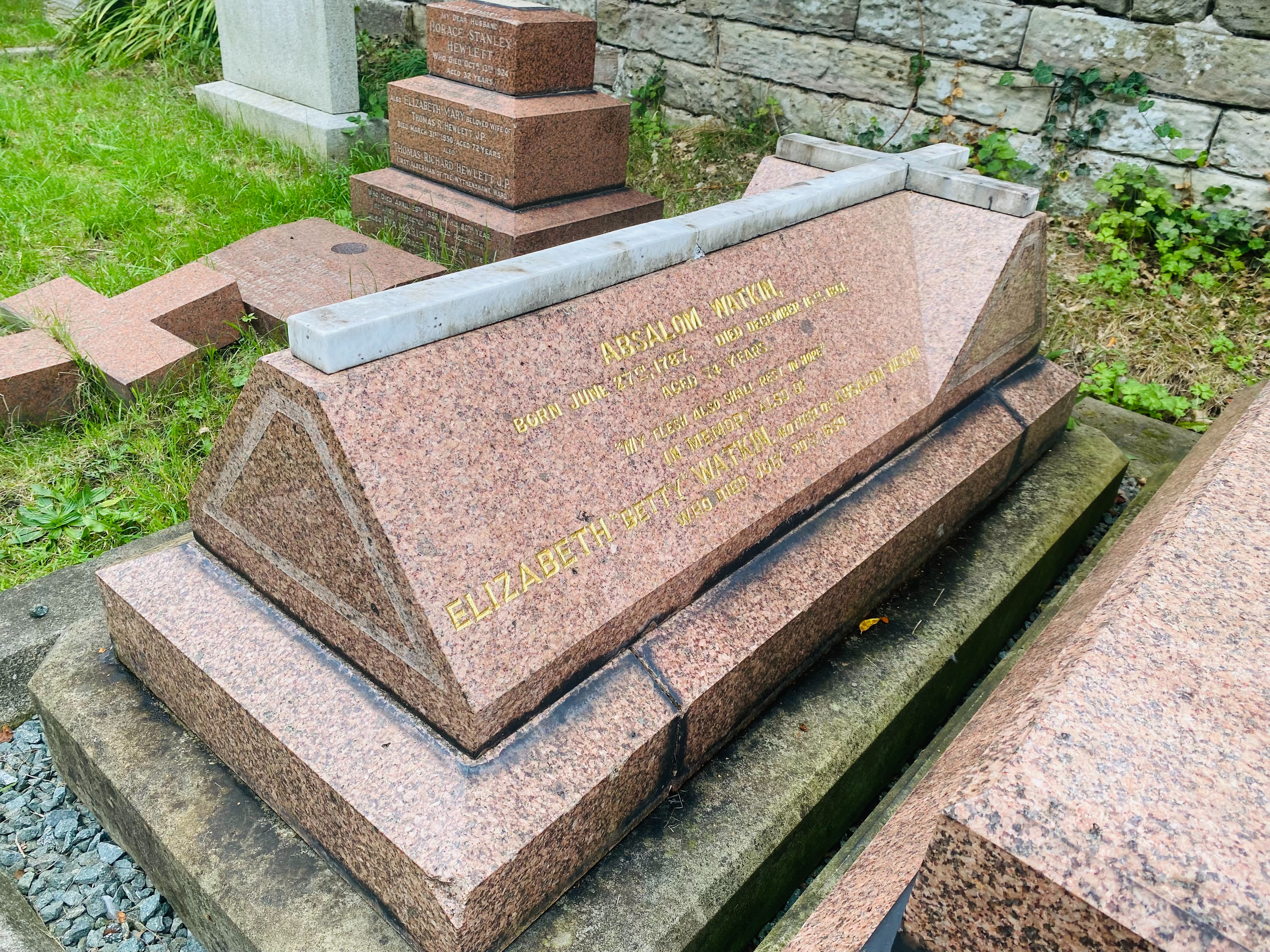
Absalom Watkin's grave in the churchyard of St Wilfrid, Northenden in Manchester

In 1832, Watkin purchased a large villa, Rose Hill in Northenden, Manchester, as the family home.

Although successful in business and public affairs, Absalom remained dissatisfied with his own life, and unhappy in his marriage. In his diaries he admits that all he wanted to do was write, tend his garden and read alone in his library. Watkin resided at Rose Hill until his death on 16 December 1861. He was buried in the family grave in the churchyard of the St Wilfrid's, Northenden.

Two of Absalom Watkin's sons also played an active role in politics, with Sir Edward Watkin becoming a railway entrepreneur and later Liberal MP, and Alfred Watkin Mayor of Manchester. A third son, Dr John Watkin, became Vicar of Strickswold, Lincolnshire.
