= Corporation Party (Manchester) =

'Corporation Party'
- Preceded by: Little Circle
- Succeeded by: Liberal Party
- Headquarters: Manchester, United Kingdom
- Ideology: Liberalism (British); Localism
- Religion: Non-conformist
- National affiliation: Whigs
- Colors: Yellow

The 'Corporation Party' was a political faction which was founded in Manchester in the 1830s. Its primary purpose was advocating the incorporation of Manchester under the terms of the Municipal Corporations Act 1835. It was broadly aligned with the Whigs and many of its members had belonged to the Little Circle.

Between 1838 and 1844, the 'Corporation Party' held all of the seats on the Manchester Borough Council due to the boycott of Conservative anti-corporators.

== See also ==
- Manchester City Council
- Manchester City Council elections
