= Thomas Potter (mayor) =

English industrialist and Liberal politician

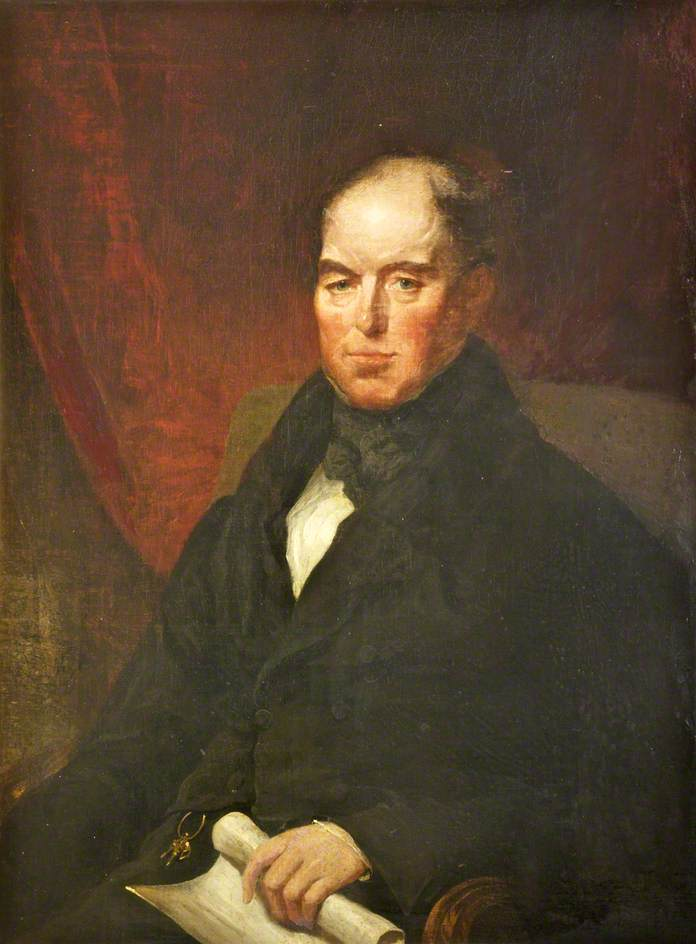
Thomas Potter

Sir Thomas Potter (5 April 1774 – 20 March 1845) was an English industrialist and Liberal politician, and the first Mayor of Manchester.

== Early life ==
Thomas Potter born on 5 April 1774 in Tadcaster, Yorkshire, the seventh of nine children of Anne Hartley and John Potter, a draper. His brothers were Richard who became MP for Wigan, and William.

His father, John Potter, was born on 7 December 1728 in Tadcaster and died there on 28 November 1802. He is buried in grave 40655 at St Mary the Virgin's Church in Tadcaster. He worked as a journeyman in London and on the death of his father, also John Potter, on 16 June 1758, and his mother, Anne, on 2 May 1762, he succeeded to their draper's shop in Tadcaster. John took a farm at Wighill where he dealt in sheep and wool. On 23 December 1785 an indenture was made for the lease of Wingate Hill Farm between Sir Walter Vavasour and John Potter "The produce of it (Wingate Hill Farm) having been successively on the advance, his shop, too, having been conducted by his wife and children, all his concerns prospered, and enabled him to set two of his sons (William and Richard) up in Manchester at the beginning of this year (1802) with a capital possessed by few beginners (£14,000). He died worth twelve thousand pounds, which, on the death of his spouse, he left equally to his sons and daughters."

William and Richard Potter opened a warehouse in Manchester at 5 Cannon Street, and a few months later they were joined by Thomas. The firm of William, Thomas and Richard Potter was established on 1 January 1803. William stood down from the business in 1806 when it became Thomas and Richard Potter.

== First Little Circle ==
The Potter family were wealthy Unitarians, members of Cross Street Chapel and the Portico Library, and were concerned with the welfare of the poor. Thomas and Richard Potter became concerned with unfair representation of the people in parliament in rapidly expanding industrialised towns such as Birmingham, Leeds, Manchester and Salford in the Victorian era and decided to form a group to promote change.

In 1815 the first Little Circle was formed, around a core of members from the Cross Street Chapel who were influenced by the ideas of Jeremy Bentham and Joseph Priestley. The founding members included John Edward Taylor (cotton merchant), Joseph Brotherton (a non-conformist minister and pioneering vegetarian), Thomas Preston, and Thomas and Richard Potter. Meetings were held in a room at the back of the Potters' Cannon Street counting-house, generally known as the "plotting-parlour", and its core membership was Unitarian. Group member Archibald Prentice (later editor of the Manchester Times) called them the "Little Circle"; other members were John Shuttleworth (industrialist and municipal reformer); Absalom Watkin (parliamentary reformer and anti corn law campaigner); and William Cowdroy Jnr (editor of the Manchester Gazette).

After group members witnessed the Peterloo Massacre in 1819, and the closure of the liberal Manchester Observer by successive police prosecutions, it decided the time was right to advance its liberalist agenda. In 1820, Brotherton, Shuttleworth and Thomas Potter founded the Manchester Chamber of Commerce. In the following year, the group supported John Edward Taylor found the liberal newspaper the Manchester Guardian to which they all contributed. Published by law only once a week, Taylor continued to edit the newspaper until his death.

== Business career ==
Whilst his brother, Richard, applied himself almost exclusively to political movements and reform, becoming Member of Parliament for Wigan in 1830, Thomas was left in charge of the management of the warehouse which developed into the largest concern of its type in Manchester.

== Second Little Circle ==
In 1821, 12 merchants met in Thomas and Richard Potter's "plotting parlour" in Cannon Street, and began a fund to support the Manchester Guardian Seven were Unitarians, including five from the Cross Street Chapel: Thomas and Richard Potter; Abasolm Watkin; Mark Philips, John Shuttleworth, John Benjamin Smith, and brothers Edward and William Baxter (all cotton merchants); Fenton Atkinson (prominent Manchester attorney); William Harvey; John Edward Taylor.

The group supported social reform issues discreetly: Taylor survived a trial for libel; Shuttleworth organised the defence of plebeian reformers accused of administering an illegal oath. The group initially proposed that the seats of rotten boroughs convicted of gross electoral corruption should be transferred to industrial towns, citing and later targeting example boroughs including Penryn and East Retford. But when Parliament refused to take action, in 1831 Absalom Watkin was tasked with drawing up a petition asking the government to grant Manchester two Members of Parliament. As a result, Parliament passed the Reform Act 1832, and the group gave Manchester its first two post-reform MPs: Mark Philips and Charles Poulett Thomson. Richard was elected MP for Wigan in 1832, holding the seat until 1839.

== Later life ==
Thomas became more involved in the business life of Manchester. Between 1832 and 1835 he led a successful campaign against church rates. After the passing of the Municipal Corporations Act in 1835, Thomas was elected to the Manchester Borough Council and became first Mayor of Manchester between 1838 and 1840. On 1 July 1840 he was granted a knighthood.

== Personal life ==
Potter married Elizabeth Palmer, daughter of John Westorby Palmer, of York in January 1808. Elizabeth had two children, Elizabeth and Anne, before she died in February 1810. After her death, John married Esther Bayley of Booth Hall, Blackley in Manchester in September 1812 in the Collegiate Church. They had four children; Esther (born July 1813 and died February 1814), John, Mary (born October 1816 and died March 1817) and Thomas. Esther senior died in June 1852 at Buile Hill in Salford and was buried in Ardwick Cemetery in June 1852. In 1818 she founded Lady Potter's Schools at Irlams o' th' Height enabling 80 girls to receive an education.

In 1825 Thomas Potter commissioned the architect, Sir Charles Barry, to design him a house at Buile Hill in Salford. This is the only house where Barry used Greek revival architecture. It was completed in 1827.

After the death of Sir Thomas's first son, Sir John Potter, Buile Hill was inherited by Sir Thomas's second son, Thomas Bayley Potter, whose youngest son, Richard Ellis Potter, was born there on 3 October 1855. Thomas Bayley Potter sold the property to John Bennett in 1877. Salford Corporation purchased the estate in 1902 and in 1906 the house opened as Salford Natural History Museum. The 80 acres of parkland were opened to the public. Buile Hill House is a grade II listed building and is one of the case studies of the Georgian Group who advocate that the principal reception rooms, staircase and hall should remain as they are (with restoration). There has been some talk of Salford City Council selling it off for hotel use but there is also a movement for its retention pending a further decision.) As of Spring 2026 the mansion is now open to the public once more. It's upper floors are Salfords registry office and it has a new cafe and a new car park. The statue of Oliver Cromwell that was part of the buildings life as a museum is also back on display

== Death ==
Potter died on 20 March 1845 at the age of 70 at home at Buile Hill. Thomas Potter is buried at Ardwick Cemetery, Manchester.

Civic offices
Preceded by Newly created position	Mayor of Manchester; 1838–1840	Succeeded by William Neil
