= Anti-Corporation Party (Manchester) =

'Anti-Corporation Party'
- Dissolved: 1846
- Preceded by: Tories
- Succeeded by: Conservative Party (UK)
- Headquarters: Manchester, United Kingdom
- Ideology: Conservatism (British); High Toryism; Antidisestablishmentarianism
- Religion: Anglican
- National affiliation: Conservative
- Colors: Blue

The Anti-Corporation Party was a political faction which was operated in Manchester in the 1830s and 1840s. Its primary purpose was opposing the incorporation of Manchester under the terms of the Municipal Corporations Act 1835. It was aligned with the Conservative Party and the Church of England.

Between 1838 and 1843, the 'Anti-Corporation' Party boycotted elections to the Manchester Borough Council, and would not win a seat on the corporation until 1844. Eventually, the anti-corporators merged with the Ratepayers' Association to form a Conservative opposition to the dominant Corporation Party.

== See also ==
- Manchester City Council
- Manchester City Council elections
