= 1838 Manchester Borough Council election =

Local election in Manchester

- 14 December 1838

48 of 64 seats to Manchester Borough Council 33 seats needed for a majority
	First party
Party	Liberal
Seats won	48
Seats after	64
Popular vote	10,713
Percentage	90.8%
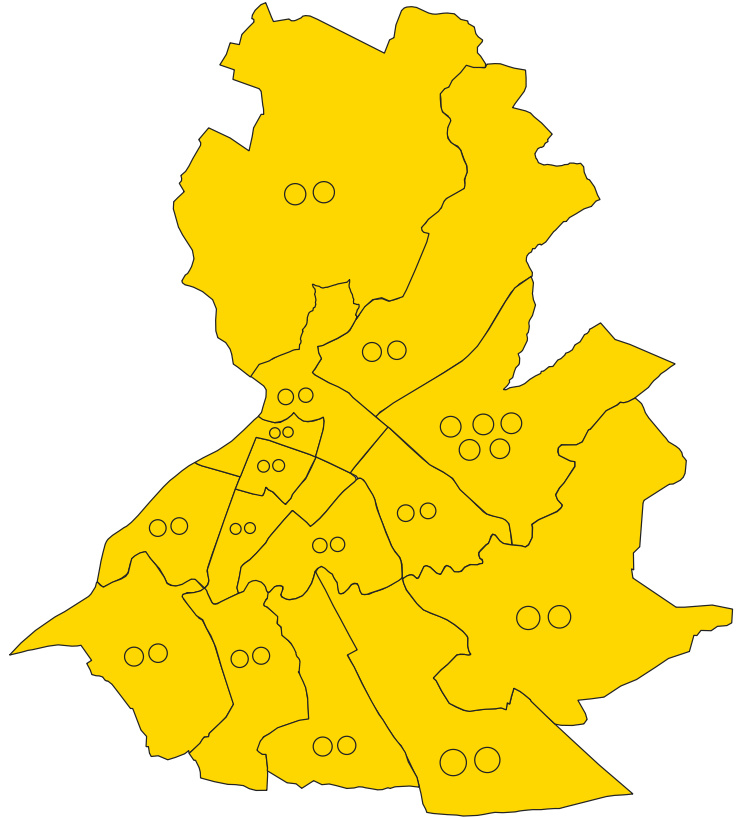
- Map of results of 1838 election
Leader of the Council after election
Liberal

Elections to Manchester Borough Council were held on Friday, 14 December 1838.

This was the first local election held in Manchester since it had been incorporated under the provisions of the Municipal Corporations Act 1835 alongside the townships of Beswick, Cheetham Hill, Chorlton upon Medlock, and Hulme. As this was the first election to the Council, all seats for each of the fifteen wards were up for election. The candidate in each ward with the highest number of votes was elected for three years, the candidate with the second highest number of votes was elected for two years and the candidate with the third highest number of votes was elected for one year. Only one of the fifteen wards was contested.

The Conservative anti-corporators boycotted the election due to their opposition to incorporation. All seats were won by the Liberal incorporators with the only opposition coming in New Cross ward where the Radicals stood a slate of candidates.

== Election result ==
Party	Votes	Seats		Full Council	
Liberal	10,713 (90.8%)	48 (100.0%)	48 / 48	64 (100.0%)	64 / 64
Radical	1,082 (9.2%)	0 (0.0%)	0 / 48	0 (0.0%)	0 / 64

=== Full council ===
↓
64

=== Aldermen ===
↓
16

=== Councillors ===
↓
48

== Ward results ==
=== All Saints' ===
All Saints'
Party	Candidate	Votes	%	±%
Liberal	Henry Marsland	150	100.0	
Liberal	Samuel Dukinfield Darbishire	149	99.3	
Liberal	Samuel Eveleigh	149	99.3	
Turnout		150		
Liberal win (new seat)				
Liberal win (new seat)				
Liberal win (new seat)				

=== Ardwick ===
Ardwick
Party	Candidate	Votes	%	±%
Liberal	William Benjamin Watkins	186	100.0	
Liberal	Paul Ferdinand Willert	185	99.5	
Liberal	Aaron Nodal	181	97.3	
Turnout		186		
Liberal win (new seat)				
Liberal win (new seat)				
Liberal win (new seat)				

=== Cheetham ===
Cheetham
Party	Candidate	Votes	%	±%
Liberal	Thomas Hopkins	127	100.0	
Liberal	John Harrison	127	100.0	
Liberal	George Heywood	127	100.0	
Turnout		127		
Liberal win (new seat)				
Liberal win (new seat)				
Liberal win (new seat)				

=== Collegiate Church ===
Collegiate Church
Party	Candidate	Votes	%	±%
Liberal	Samuel Satterthwaite	440	100.0	
Liberal	James Kershaw	439	99.8	
Liberal	George Hargreaves Winder	437	99.3	
Turnout		440		
Liberal win (new seat)				
Liberal win (new seat)				
Liberal win (new seat)				

=== Exchange ===
Exchange
Party	Candidate	Votes	%	±%
Liberal	Edward Shawcross	194	100.0	
Liberal	Elkanah Armitage	194	100.0	
Liberal	Daniel Broadhurst	194	100.0	
Turnout		194		
Liberal win (new seat)				
Liberal win (new seat)				
Liberal win (new seat)				

=== Medlock Street ===
Medlock Street
Party	Candidate	Votes	%	±%
Liberal	Abraham Smith	179	100.0	
Liberal	John Richardson White	178	99.4	
Liberal	John Naylor	175	97.8	
Turnout		179		
Liberal win (new seat)				
Liberal win (new seat)				
Liberal win (new seat)				

=== New Cross ===
New Cross
Party	Candidate	Votes	%	±%
Liberal	Henry Day	368	73.0	
Liberal	Edmund Dodgshon	328	65.1	
Liberal	William Howarth	324	64.3	
Liberal	James Hampson	319	63.3	
Liberal	Archibald Prentice	301	59.7	
Liberal	C. J. S. Walker	299	59.3	
Radical	James Wroe	221	43.8	
Radical	John Broadie	184	36.5	
Radical	James Redfern	179	35.5	
Radical	William Grimshaw Seed	171	33.9	
Radical	William Willis	165	32.7	
Radical	William Croft	162	32.1	
Majority		78	15.5	
Turnout		504		
Liberal win (new seat)				
Liberal win (new seat)				
Liberal win (new seat)				
Liberal win (new seat)				
Liberal win (new seat)				
Liberal win (new seat)				

=== Oxford ===
Oxford
Party	Candidate	Votes	%	±%
Liberal	Samuel Stocks	199	100.0	
Liberal	Richard Roberts	198	99.5	
Liberal	Henry Tootal	198	99.5	
Turnout		199		
Liberal win (new seat)				
Liberal win (new seat)				
Liberal win (new seat)				

=== St. Ann's ===
St. Ann's
Party	Candidate	Votes	%	±%
Liberal	Henry Newbery	193	100.0	
Liberal	John Herford	193	100.0	
Liberal	John Edward Taylor	192	99.5	
Turnout		193		
Liberal win (new seat)				
Liberal win (new seat)				
Liberal win (new seat)				

=== St. Clement's ===
St. Clement's
Party	Candidate	Votes	%	±%
Liberal	Thomas Molineaux	204	100.0	
Liberal	William Neild	204	100.0	
Liberal	William Woodward	203	99.5	
Turnout		204		
Liberal win (new seat)				
Liberal win (new seat)				
Liberal win (new seat)				

=== St. George's ===
St. George's
Party	Candidate	Votes	%	±%
Liberal	Henry Wadkin	137	100.0	
Liberal	George Smith	136	99.3	
Liberal	William Nicholson	135	98.5	
Turnout		137		
Liberal win (new seat)				
Liberal win (new seat)				
Liberal win (new seat)				

=== St. James' ===
St. James'
Party	Candidate	Votes	%	±%
Liberal	William Nuttall	284	100.0	
Liberal	William Romaine Callender	281	98.9	
Liberal	George Nelson	281	98.9	
Turnout		284		
Liberal win (new seat)				
Liberal win (new seat)				
Liberal win (new seat)				

=== St. John's ===
St. John's
Party	Candidate	Votes	%	±%
Liberal	Alexander Kay	238	100.0	
Liberal	George Brown	238	100.0	
Liberal	John Griffiths	237	99.6	
Turnout		238		
Liberal win (new seat)				
Liberal win (new seat)				
Liberal win (new seat)				

=== St. Luke's ===
St. Luke's
Party	Candidate	Votes	%	±%
Liberal	John Mayson	245	100.0	
Liberal	Joseph Smith Grafton	245	100.0	
Liberal	Thomas Broadbent	244	99.6	
Turnout		245		
Liberal win (new seat)				
Liberal win (new seat)				
Liberal win (new seat)				

=== St. Michael's ===
St. Michael's
Party	Candidate	Votes	%	±%
Liberal	Richard Cobden	160	100.0	
Liberal	John Brooks	159	99.4	
Liberal	Thomas Potter	159	99.4	
Turnout		160		
Liberal win (new seat)				
Liberal win (new seat)				
Liberal win (new seat)				

== Aldermanic elections ==
=== Aldermanic election, 15 December 1838 ===
Aldermanic elections took place during the council's first meeting on 15 December 1838, all aldermanic seats were up for election.

Party	Alderman	Votes	Term	Ward
Liberal	Henry Tootal	45	1844	All Saints'
Liberal	Thomas Potter	45	1844	Ardwick
Liberal	James Kershaw	45	1844	Collegiate Church
Liberal	Richard Cobden	45	1844	Medlock Street
Liberal	C. J. S. Walker	45	1844	New Cross
Liberal	William Romaine Callender	45	1844	St. James'
Liberal	John Brooks	45	1844	St. Michael's
Liberal	Daniel Broadhurst	45	1841	Exchange
Liberal	James Murray	45	1841	New Cross
Liberal	Alexander Kay	45	1841	St. John's
Liberal	William Neild	44	1844	St. Clement's
Liberal	John Burd	44	1841	Cheetham
Liberal	John Macvicar	44	1841	Oxford
Liberal	Richard Roberts	44	1841	St. Ann's
Liberal	John Shuttleworth	44	1841	St. George's
Liberal	Joshua Procter Westhead	44	1841	St. Luke's
Liberal	James Hampson	2	N/A	N/A
Liberal	Thomas Hopkins	1	N/A	N/A
Liberal	Shakespear Phillips	1	N/A	N/A
Liberal	William Rawson	1	N/A	N/A

== By-elections between 1838 and 1839 ==
=== By-elections, 16 May 1839 ===
Seven by-elections were held on 16 May 1839 to fill vacancies that were created by the appointment of aldermen on 15 December 1838.

==== Collegiate Church ====
Caused by the election as an alderman of Councillor James Kershaw (Liberal, Collegiate Church, elected 14 December 1838) on 15 December 1838, following the incorporation of Manchester Borough Council on 14 December 1838, requiring the election of aldermen by the council.

Collegiate Church
Party	Candidate	Votes	%	±%
Liberal	Thomas Woolley	uncontested		
Liberal hold		Swing		

==== New Cross ====
Caused by the election as an alderman of Councillor C. J. S. Walker (Liberal, New Cross, elected 14 December 1838) on 15 December 1838, following the incorporation of Manchester Borough Council on 14 December 1838, requiring the election of aldermen by the council.

New Cross
Party	Candidate	Votes	%	±%
Liberal	John Swindells	uncontested		
Liberal hold		Swing		

==== Oxford ====
Caused by the election as an alderman of Councillor Henry Tootal (Liberal, Oxford, elected 14 December 1838) on 15 December 1838, following the incorporation of Manchester Borough Council on 14 December 1838, requiring the election of aldermen by the council.

Oxford
Party	Candidate	Votes	%	±%
Liberal	Samuel Lowcock	uncontested		
Liberal hold		Swing		

==== St. Clement's ====
Caused by the election as an alderman of Councillor William Neild (Liberal, St. Clement's, elected 14 December 1838) on 15 December 1838, following the incorporation of Manchester Borough Council on 14 December 1838, requiring the election of aldermen by the council.

St. Clement's
Party	Candidate	Votes	%	±%
Liberal	Matthew Curtis	uncontested		
Liberal hold		Swing		

==== St. James' ====
Caused by the election as an alderman of Councillor William Romaine Callender (Liberal, St. James', elected 14 December 1838) on 15 December 1838, following the incorporation of Manchester Borough Council on 14 December 1838, requiring the election of aldermen by the council.

St. James'
Party	Candidate	Votes	%	±%
Liberal	Thomas Gasquoine	uncontested		
Liberal hold		Swing		

==== St. John's ====
Caused by the election as an alderman of Councillor Alexander Kay (Liberal, St. John's, elected 14 December 1838) on 15 December 1838, following the incorporation of Manchester Borough Council on 14 December 1838, requiring the election of aldermen by the council.

St. John's
Party	Candidate	Votes	%	±%
Liberal	Thomas Frodsham	uncontested		
Liberal hold		Swing		

==== St. Michael's ====
Caused by the election as an alderman of Councillor Richard Cobden (Liberal, St. Michael's, elected 14 December 1838), Councillor John Brooks (Liberal, St. Michael's, elected 14 December 1838), and the Mayor, Councillor Thomas Potter (Liberal, St. Michael's, elected 14 December 1838) on 15 December 1838, following the incorporation of Manchester Borough Council on 14 December 1838, requiring the election of aldermen by the council.

St. Michael's (3 vacancies)
Party	Candidate	Votes	%	±%
Liberal	Joseph Adshead	uncontested		
Liberal	Thomas Molineaux	uncontested		
Liberal	Henry Hilton	uncontested		
Liberal hold		Swing		
Liberal hold		Swing		
Liberal hold		Swing		
