= Little Circle =

Historical group of liberal reformers in Manchester, England

The Little Circle was a Manchester-based group of Non-conformist Liberals, mostly members of the Portico Library, who held a common agenda with regard to political and social reform. The first group met from 1815 onwards to campaign for expanded political representation and gain social reform in the United Kingdom. The second group operated from 1830 onwards and was key in creating the popular movement that resulted in the Reform Act 1832.

== Background ==
In 1819, Lancashire was represented by two members of parliament (MPs). Voting was restricted to the adult male owners of freehold land valued at 40 shillings or more – the equivalent of about £80 as of 2008 – and votes could only be cast in the county town of Lancaster, by a public spoken declaration at the hustings. Constituency boundaries were out of date, and the "rotten boroughs" had a hugely disproportionate influence on the membership of the Parliament of the United Kingdom compared to the size of their populations: Old Sarum, with one voter, elected two MPs, as did Dunwich which had almost completely disappeared into the sea by the early 19th century. The major urban centres, Manchester, Salford, Bolton, Blackburn, Rochdale, Ashton-under-Lyne, Oldham and Stockport, with a combined population of almost one million, were represented by either the two county MPs for Lancashire, or the two for Cheshire in the case of Stockport. By comparison, more than half of all MPs were elected by a total of just 154 voters. These inequalities in political representation led to calls for reform.

== First Little Circle ==
The first Little Circle was formed from 1815 onwards by cotton merchant John Potter. The group was influenced by the ideas of Jeremy Bentham and Joseph Priestley, objecting to a political representation system that denied booming industrial cities such as Birmingham, Leeds and Manchester proportionate representation in the House of Commons.

Meetings were held at John Potter's home and its core membership were Unitarians. Archibald Prentice (later editor of the Manchester Times) called them the "Little Circle" and its members included John Potter and his sons Thomas (later first mayor of Manchester), Richard (later MP for Wigan) and William; Joseph Brotherton (Non-conformist minister and pioneering vegetarian); John Edward Taylor (cotton merchant); John Shuttleworth (industrialist and municipal reformer); Absalom Watkin (parliamentary reformer and anti corn law campaigner); and William Cowdroy Jnr (editor of the Manchester Gazette).

After witnessing the Peterloo massacre in 1819, and the closure of the liberal Manchester Observer in successive police prosecutions, the group decided that the time was right to advance its liberalist agenda.

In 1820 Brotherton, Shuttleworth and Thomas Potter founded the Manchester Chamber of Commerce. In the following year, the group supported John Edward Taylor in founding a liberal newspaper the Manchester Guardian, to which they all contributed. Taylor continued to edit the newspaper which was published by law only once a week until his death.

== Second Little Circle ==
From 1830 a second Little Circle, comprising 11 Manchester businessmen, met at the Cannon Street warehouse of Potter's trading company. Seven were Unitarians, including five from the Cross Street Chapel: Thomas and Richard Potter; Absalom Watkin; Mark Philips, John Shuttleworth, John Benjamin Smith, and brothers, Edward and William Baxter (all cotton merchants); Fenton Atkinson (Manchester attorney); William Harvey; John Edward Taylor. The group supported social reform issues closely but discreetly: Taylor survived a trial for libel; Shuttleworth organised the defence of plebeian reformers accused of administering an illegal oath.

The group initially proposed that the seats of rotten boroughs convicted of gross electoral corruption should be transferred to industrial towns, citing and targeting example boroughs including Penryn and East Retford. But when Parliament refused to take action, in 1831 Absalom Watkin drew up a petition asking the government to grant Manchester two members of parliament. Parliament passed the Reform Act in 1832, and the group gave Manchester its first post-reform MPs: Mark Philips and Charles Poulett Thomson.

== Legacy ==
By the time the Reform Act 1832 had become law, Manchester had become a borough and many social reforms had come to fruition. Members of the group had established themselves in society, with Joseph Brotherton becoming MP for Salford, Richard Potter, MP for Wigan and John Benjamin Smith became MP for Stirling Burghs and later Stockport. Thomas Potter became the first Mayor of Manchester on its incorporation. Ten out of the first 28 mayors of Manchester were associated with Cross Street Chapel.
