= New Cross (ward) =

- Ward
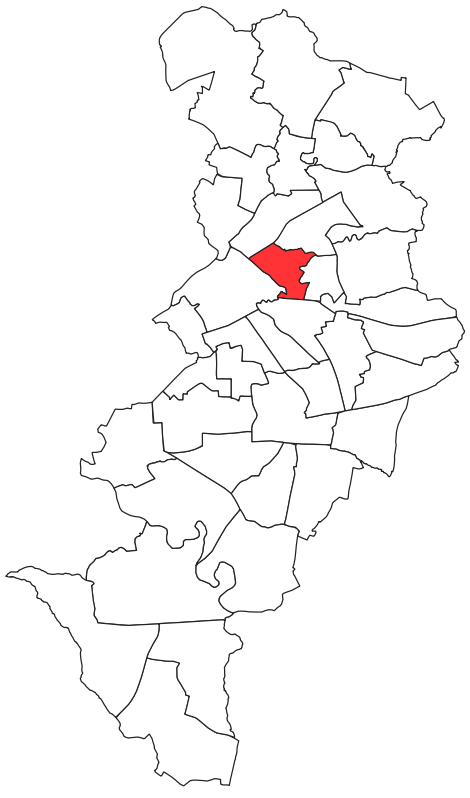
- New Cross ward (1954) within Manchester

- Coat of arms
- Country: United Kingdom
- Constituent country: England
- Region: North West England
- County borough: Manchester
- Created: December 1838
- Named for: New Cross, Manchester

Government
  - Type: Unicameral
  - Body: Manchester City Council
- UK Parliamentary Constituency: Manchester Exchange

New Cross was an electoral division of Manchester City Council which was represented from 1838 until 1971. It covered an area near Manchester city centre including Ancoats and a part of what is now the Northern Quarter.

== Overview ==
New Cross ward was one of the fifteen municipal wards created in 1838, when the Manchester Borough Council was granted a Charter of Incorporation under the provisions of the Municipal Corporations Act 1835.

Initially, the ward's boundaries corresponded with those of District No.1 (New Cross) of the Manchester Township, which covered the Ancoats area to the east of Manchester city centre. Due to its size, the ward was given double representation, returning six councillors to Manchester City Council instead of the usual three. In 1919, that part of the ward to the north of Butler Street was transferred to the Miles Platting ward and the number of councillors representing the ward was reduced from six to three. Following a further boundary revision in 1950, a small part of the Ardwick ward to the north of Ashton Old Road was transferred to the ward. The ward was abolished in 1971, with most of its area being transferred to the Beswick ward.

From 1838 until 1885, the ward formed part of the Manchester Parliamentary constituency. From 1885 until 1918, it was part of the Manchester North East Parliamentary constituency. From 1918 until 1955, it was part of the Manchester Ardwick Parliamentary constituency. From 1955 until its abolition, it was part of the Manchester Exchange Parliamentary constituency.

== Councillors ==
Election	Councillor	Councillor	Councillor	Councillor	Councillor	Councillor
1838	Henry Day (Lib)	Edmund Dodgshon (Lib)	William Howarth (Lib)	James Hampson (Lib)	Archibald Prentice (Lib)	C. J. S. Walker (Lib)
May 1839	Henry Day (Lib)	Edmund Dodgshon (Lib)	William Howarth (Lib)	James Hampson (Lib)	Archibald Prentice (Lib)	John Swindells (Lib)
1839	Henry Day (Lib)	Edmund Dodgshon (Lib)	William Howarth (Lib)	James Hampson (Lib)	Archibald Prentice (Lib)	John Swindells (Lib)
1840	Henry Day (Lib)	Edmund Dodgshon (Lib)	Thomas Dodgshon (Lib)	James Hampson (Lib)	Archibald Prentice (Lib)	John Swindells (Lib)
1841	Henry Day (Lib)	William Hanley (Lib)	Thomas Dodgshon (Lib)	James Hampson (Lib)	Archibald Prentice (Lib)	John Swindells (Lib)
1842	Henry Day (Lib)	William Hanley (Lib)	Thomas Dodgshon (Lib)	James Hampson (Lib)	George Robertson (Lib)	John Swindells (Lib)
1843	Henry Day (Lib)	William Hanley (Lib)	Archibald Prentice (Lib)	James Hampson (Lib)	George Robertson (Lib)	John Swindells (Lib)
1844	Thomas Lewis Williams (Con)	George Peel (Con)	Archibald Prentice (Lib)	James Hampson (Lib)	George Robertson (Lib)	John Swindells (Lib)
1845	Thomas Lewis Williams (Con)	George Peel (Con)	Archibald Prentice (Lib)	James Hampson (Lib)	John Howard (Con)	John Swindells (Lib)
(1845-1872)
1872	W. Smith (Lib)	H. Shaw (Con)	T. Greenwood (Con)	J. Woodhouse (Con)	W. G. Bennett (Con)	A. Woodward (Con)
1872	W. Smith (Lib)	H. Shaw (Con)	C. Stewart (Lib)	T. Bright (Lib)	W. G. Bennett (Con)	A. Woodward (Con)
1874	W. Smith (Lib)	H. Shaw (Con)	C. Stewart (Lib)	T. Bright (Lib)	W. G. Bennett (Con)	A. Woodward (Con)
1875	W. Smith (Lib)	H. Shaw (Con)	C. Stewart (Lib)	T. Bright (Lib)	C. Rowley (Lib)	G. Howarth (Lib)
1876	W. Smith (Lib)	H. Shaw (Con)	C. Stewart (Lib)	T. Bright (Lib)	C. Rowley (Lib)	G. Howarth (Lib)
1877	W. Smith (Lib)	H. Shaw (Con)	C. Stewart (Lib)	T. Bright (Lib)	C. Rowley (Lib)	G. Howarth (Lib)
1878	W. Smith (Lib)	H. Shaw (Con)	C. Stewart (Lib)	T. Bright (Lib)	C. Rowley (Lib)	G. Howarth (Lib)
1879	W. Smith (Lib)	H. Shaw (Con)	C. Stewart (Lib)	T. Bright (Lib)	C. Rowley (Lib)	G. Howarth (Lib)
1880	W. Smith (Lib)	H. Shaw (Con)	C. Stewart (Lib)	T. Bright (Lib)	C. Rowley (Lib)	G. Howarth (Lib)
1881	W. Smith (Lib)	H. Shaw (Con)	C. Stewart (Lib)	T. Bright (Lib)	C. Rowley (Lib)	G. Howarth (Lib)
1882	W. Smith (Lib)	H. Shaw (Con)	C. Stewart (Lib)	T. Bright (Lib)	C. Rowley (Lib)	G. Howarth (Lib)
1883	A. McDougall (Lib)	H. Shaw (Con)	C. Stewart (Lib)	J. Grantham (Con)	C. Rowley (Lib)	G. Howarth (Lib)
1884	A. McDougall (Lib)	H. Shaw (Con)	C. Stewart (Lib)	J. Grantham (Con)	J. Woodhouse (Con)	J. Swindells (Con)
1885	A. McDougall (Lib)	H. Shaw (Con)	H. C. Pingstone (Lib)	J. Grantham (Con)	J. Woodhouse (Con)	J. Swindells (Con)
November 1885	A. McDougall (Lib)	S. Redfern (Con)	H. C. Pingstone (Lib)	J. Grantham (Con)	J. Woodhouse (Con)	J. Swindells (Con)
1886	R. Lloyd (Lib)	M. Haworth (Lib)	H. C. Pingstone (Lib U)	J. Grantham (Con)	J. Woodhouse (Con)	J. Swindells (Con)
1887	R. Lloyd (Lib)	M. Haworth (Lib)	H. C. Pingstone (Lib U)	J. Grantham (Con)	H. Aldred (Lib)	J. B. Fullerton (Lib)
1888	R. Lloyd (Lib)	W. Birkbeck (Lib)	H. C. Pingstone (Lib U)	J. Grantham (Con)	H. Aldred (Lib)	J. B. Fullerton (Lib)
1889	R. Lloyd (Lib)	W. Birkbeck (Lib)	H. C. Pingstone (Lib U)	J. Grantham (Con)	H. Aldred (Lib)	J. B. Fullerton (Lib)
1890	R. Lloyd (Lib)	W. Birkbeck (Lib)	H. C. Pingstone (Lib U)	J. Grantham (Con)	H. Aldred (Lib)	J. B. Fullerton (Lib)
1891	R. Lloyd (Lib)	W. Birkbeck (Lib)	H. C. Pingstone (Lib U)	J. Grantham (Con)	H. Aldred (Lib)	J. B. Fullerton (Lib)
1892	R. Lloyd (Lib)	W. Birkbeck (Lib)	H. C. Pingstone (Lib U)	J. Grantham (Con)	H. Aldred (Lib)	J. B. Fullerton (Lib)
1893	R. Lloyd (Lib)	W. Birkbeck (Lib)	H. C. Pingstone (Lib U)	J. Grantham (Con)	H. Aldred (Lib)	W. Holland (Con)
June 1894	R. Lloyd (Lib)	W. Birkbeck (Lib)	H. C. Pingstone (Lib U)	J. N. Ogden (Con)	H. Aldred (Lib)	W. Holland (Con)
1894	R. Lloyd (Lib)	W. Birkbeck (Lib)	D. Boyle (Lib)	J. N. Ogden (Con)	H. Aldred (Lib)	W. Holland (Con)
1895	R. Lloyd (Lib)	W. Birkbeck (Lib)	D. Boyle (Lib)	J. N. Ogden (Con)	H. Aldred (Lib)	W. Holland (Con)
1896	R. Lloyd (Lib)	W. Birkbeck (Lib)	D. Boyle (Lib)	J. N. Ogden (Con)	R. Bishop (Lib)	W. Holland (Con)
1897	R. Lloyd (Lib)	W. Birkbeck (Lib)	D. Boyle (Lib)	J. Simpson (Lib)	R. Bishop (Lib)	W. Holland (Con)
1898	J. Grime (Con)	W. Birkbeck (Lib)	D. Boyle (Lib)	J. Simpson (Lib)	R. Bishop (Lib)	W. Holland (Con)
1899	J. Grime (Con)	W. Birkbeck (Lib)	D. Boyle (Lib)	J. Simpson (Lib)	R. Bishop (Lib)	M. Grimshaw (Lib)
1900	J. Grime (Con)	W. Birkbeck (Lib)	D. Boyle (Lib)	J. Simpson (Lib)	R. Bishop (Lib)	M. Grimshaw (Lib)
December 1900	J. Grime (Con)	G. Howarth (Lib)	D. Boyle (Lib)	J. Simpson (Lib)	R. Bishop (Lib)	M. Grimshaw (Lib)
1901	J. Grime (Con)	G. Howarth (Lib)	D. Boyle (Lib)	J. Simpson (Lib)	R. Bishop (Lib)	M. Grimshaw (Lib)
1902	J. Grime (Con)	G. Howarth (Lib)	D. Boyle (Lib)	J. Simpson (Lib)	R. Bishop (Lib)	N. Meadowcroft (Con)
December 1902	J. Grime (Con)	G. Howarth (Lib)	D. Boyle (Lib)	J. Simpson (Lib)	W. B. Broadhead (Con)	N. Meadowcroft (Con)
1903	J. Grime (Con)	G. Howarth (Lib)	D. Boyle (Lib)	J. Simpson (Lib)	W. B. Broadhead (Con)	N. Meadowcroft (Con)
1904	J. Grime (Con)	G. Howarth (Lib)	D. Boyle (Lib)	J. Simpson (Lib)	W. B. Broadhead (Con)	N. Meadowcroft (Con)
1905	J. Grime (Con)	G. Howarth (Lib)	D. Boyle (Lib)	J. Simpson (Lib)	T. R. Marr (Lab)	N. Meadowcroft (Con)
1906	J. Grime (Con)	G. Howarth (Lib)	D. Boyle (Lib)	J. Wallwork (Con)	T. R. Marr (Lab)	N. Meadowcroft (Con)
1907	J. Grime (Con)	G. Howarth (Lib)	D. Boyle (Lib)	J. Wallwork (Con)	T. R. Marr (Lab)	N. Meadowcroft (Con)
1908	J. Grime (Con)	G. Howarth (Lib)	D. Boyle (Lib)	J. Wallwork (Con)	T. R. Marr (Lab)	N. Meadowcroft (Con)
November 1908	J. Grime (Con)	G. Howarth (Lib)	J. W. J. Cremlyn (Con)	J. Wallwork (Con)	T. R. Marr (Lab)	N. Meadowcroft (Con)
1909	J. Grime (Con)	G. Howarth (Lib)	A. Taylor (Con)	T. Wilson (Con)	T. R. Marr (Lab)	N. Meadowcroft (Con)
1910	J. Grime (Con)	J. T. Jones (Lab)	A. Taylor (Con)	T. Wilson (Con)	T. R. Marr (Lab)	N. Meadowcroft (Con)
1911	J. Grime (Con)	J. T. Jones (Lab)	A. Taylor (Con)	T. Wilson (Con)	T. R. Marr (Lab)	N. Meadowcroft (Con)
November 1911	J. C. Grime (Con)	J. T. Jones (Lab)	A. Taylor (Con)	T. Wilson (Con)	T. R. Marr (Lab)	N. Meadowcroft (Con)
1912	J. C. Grime (Con)	J. T. Jones (Lab)	A. Taylor (Con)	C. E. B. Russell (Con)	T. R. Marr (Lab)	N. Meadowcroft (Con)
1913	J. C. Grime (Con)	G. Howarth (Lib)	A. Taylor (Con)	C. E. B. Russell (Con)	T. R. Marr (Lab)	N. Meadowcroft (Con)
November 1913	J. C. Grime (Con)	G. Howarth (Lib)	A. Taylor (Con)	C. B. Walker (Con)	T. R. Marr (Lab)	N. Meadowcroft (Con)
February 1914	J. C. Grime (Con)	O. R. Whittaker (Con)	A. Taylor (Con)	C. B. Walker (Con)	T. R. Marr (Lab)	N. Meadowcroft (Con)
1914	J. C. Grime (Con)	O. R. Whittaker (Con)	A. Taylor (Con)	C. B. Walker (Con)	T. R. Marr (Lab)	N. Meadowcroft (Con)
1919	A. Taylor (Con)	J. Milner (Lib)	J. C. Grime (Con)			
1920	A. Taylor (Con)	J. Milner (Lib)	J. C. Grime (Con)			
1921	A. Taylor (Con)	J. Milner (Lib)	J. C. Grime (Con)			
1922	A. Taylor (Con)	J. Milner (Lib)	J. C. Grime (Con)			
1923	A. Taylor (Con)	J. Milner (Lib)	J. C. Grime (Con)			
1924	A. Taylor (Con)	R. Matthews (Lab)	J. C. Grime (Con)			
1925	T. M. Larrad (Lab)	R. Matthews (Lab)	J. C. Grime (Con)			
1926	T. M. Larrad (Lab)	R. Matthews (Lab)	W. Hallows (Lab)			
1927	T. M. Larrad (Lab)	R. Matthews (Lab)	W. Hallows (Lab)			
1928	S. Fitton (Con)	R. Matthews (Lab)	W. Hallows (Lab)			
1929	S. Fitton (Con)	R. Matthews (Lab)	W. Hallows (Lab)			
1930	S. Fitton (Con)	R. Matthews (Lab)	W. Hallows (Lab)			
1931	S. Fitton (Con)	R. Matthews (Lab)	W. Hallows (Lab)			
1932	S. Fitton (Con)	R. Matthews (Lab)	W. Hallows (Lab)			
November 1932	S. Fitton (Con)	L. M. Lever (Lab)	W. Hallows (Lab)			
1933	S. Fitton (Con)	L. M. Lever (Lab)	W. Hallows (Lab)			
1934	E. Griffiths (Lab)	L. M. Lever (Lab)	W. Hallows (Lab)			
1935	E. Griffiths (Lab)	L. M. Lever (Lab)	W. Hallows (Lab)			
1936	E. Griffiths (Lab)	L. M. Lever (Lab)	W. Hallows (Lab)			
1937	H. J. Delargy (Lab)	L. M. Lever (Lab)	W. Hallows (Lab)			
October 1938	H. J. Delargy (Lab)	L. M. Lever (Lab)	W. Hallows (Ind. Lab)			
1938	H. J. Delargy (Lab)	L. M. Lever (Lab)	M. Knight (Lab)			
1945	H. J. Delargy (Lab)	L. M. Lever (Lab)	M. Knight (Lab)			
1946	W. Murray (Lab)	L. M. Lever (Lab)	M. Knight (Lab)			
1947	W. Murray (Lab)	L. M. Lever (Lab)	M. Knight (Lab)			
1949	W. Murray (Lab)	C. Blackwell (Lab)	M. Knight (Lab)			
1950	W. Murray (Lab)	C. Blackwell (Lab)	M. Knight (Lab)			
1951	W. Murray (Lab)	C. Blackwell (Lab)	M. Knight (Lab)			
1952	W. Murray (Lab)	C. Blackwell (Lab)	M. Knight (Lab)			
1953	W. Murray (Lab)	C. Blackwell (Lab)	M. Knight (Lab)			
1954	W. Murray (Lab)	C. Blackwell (Lab)	M. Knight (Lab)			
1955	W. Murray (Lab)	C. Blackwell (Lab)	M. Knight (Lab)			
1956	W. Murray (Lab)	C. Blackwell (Lab)	E. Crank (Lab)			
1957	W. Murray (Lab)	C. Blackwell (Lab)	E. Crank (Lab)			
1958	W. Murray (Lab)	C. Blackwell (Lab)	E. Crank (Lab)			
1959	W. Murray (Lab)	C. Blackwell (Lab)	E. Crank (Lab)			
1960	W. Murray (Lab)	C. Blackwell (Lab)	E. Crank (Lab)			
1961	W. Murray (Lab)	C. Blackwell (Lab)	E. Crank (Lab)			
1962	W. Murray (Lab)	C. Blackwell (Lab)	E. Crank (Lab)			
1963	W. Murray (Lab)	C. Blackwell (Lab)	E. Crank (Lab)			
1964	E. Donoghue (Lab)	C. Blackwell (Lab)	E. Crank (Lab)			
1965	E. Donoghue (Lab)	C. Blackwell (Lab)	E. Crank (Lab)			
June 1965	E. Donoghue (Lab)	R. Latham (Lab)	E. Crank (Lab)			
1966	E. Donoghue (Lab)	R. Latham (Lab)	E. Crank (Lab)			
1967	E. Donoghue (Lab)	R. Latham (Lab)	E. Crank (Lab)			
1968	E. Donoghue (Lab)	R. Latham (Lab)	E. Crank (Lab)			
1969	E. Donoghue (Lab)	R. Latham (Lab)	E. Crank (Lab)			
1970	E. Donoghue (Lab)	R. Latham (Lab)	E. Crank (Lab)			

== Elections ==
=== Elections in 1830s ===
==== December 1838 ====
1838 (6 vacancies)
Party	Candidate	Votes	%	±%
Liberal	Henry Day	368	73.0	
Liberal	Edmund Dodgshon	328	65.1	
Liberal	William Howarth	324	64.3	
Liberal	James Hampson	319	63.3	
Liberal	Archibald Prentice	301	59.7	
Liberal	C. J. S. Walker	299	59.3	
Radical	James Wroe	221	43.8	
Radical	John Broadie	184	36.5	
Radical	James Redfern	179	35.5	
Radical	William Grimshaw Seed	171	33.9	
Radical	William Willis	165	32.7	
Radical	William Croft	162	32.1	
Majority		78	15.5	
Turnout		504		
Liberal win (new seat)				
Liberal win (new seat)				
Liberal win (new seat)				
Liberal win (new seat)				
Liberal win (new seat)				
Liberal win (new seat)				

==== May 1839 (by-election) ====
By-election: 16 May 1839
Party	Candidate	Votes	%	±%
Liberal	John Swindells	uncontested		
Liberal hold		Swing		

==== November 1839 ====
1839
Party	Candidate	Votes	%	±%
Liberal	John Swindells*	331	56.2	−16.8
Liberal	Archibald Prentice*	311	52.8	−20.2
Radical	James Wroe	270	45.8	+2.0
Radical	James Scholefield	266	45.2	+1.4
Majority		41	7.0	−8.5
Turnout		589		
Liberal hold		Swing		
Liberal hold		Swing		

=== Elections in 1840s ===
==== November 1840 ====
1840
Party	Candidate	Votes	%	±%
Liberal	Thomas Dodgshon	uncontested		
Liberal	James Hampson*	uncontested		
Liberal hold		Swing		
Liberal hold		Swing		

==== November 1841 ====
1841
Party	Candidate	Votes	%	±%
Liberal	Henry Day*	uncontested		
Liberal	William Hanley	uncontested		
Liberal hold		Swing		
Liberal hold		Swing		

==== November 1842 ====
1842
Party	Candidate	Votes	%	±%
Liberal	George Robertson	uncontested		
Liberal	John Swindells*	uncontested		
Liberal hold		Swing		
Liberal hold		Swing		

==== November 1843 ====
1843
Party	Candidate	Votes	%	±%
Liberal	James Hampson*	uncontested		
Liberal	Archibald Prentice*	uncontested		
Liberal hold		Swing		
Liberal hold		Swing		

==== November 1844 ====
1844
Party	Candidate	Votes	%	±%
Conservative	Thomas Lewis Williams	241	60.1	N/A
Conservative	George Peel	230	57.4	N/A
Liberal	John Woolfall	153	38.2	N/A
Liberal	William Howarth	146	36.4	N/A
Radical	John Hewitt	32	8.0	N/A
Majority		77	19.2	N/A
Turnout		401		
Conservative gain from Liberal		Swing		
Conservative gain from Liberal		Swing		

==== November 1845 ====
1845
Party	Candidate	Votes	%	±%
Conservative	John Howard	214	51.6	−8.5
Liberal	John Swindells*	213	51.3	+13.1
Conservative	Matthew Kennedy	206	49.6	−10.5
Liberal	George Robertson*	187	45.1	+6.9
Majority		7	1.7	
Turnout		415		
Conservative gain from Liberal		Swing		
Liberal hold		Swing		

=== Elections in 1870s ===
==== November 1872 ====
1872
Party	Candidate	Votes	%	±%
Conservative	A. Woodward*	2,982	54.7	
Conservative	W. G. Bennett	2,742	50.3	
Liberal	C. Stewart*	2,586	47.5	
Majority		156	2.8	
Turnout		5,448		
Conservative hold		Swing		
Conservative gain from Liberal		Swing		

==== November 1873 ====
1873
Party	Candidate	Votes	%	±%
Liberal	C. Stewart	3,117	54.0	+6.5
Liberal	T. Bright	2,928	50.7	+3.2
Conservative	T. Greenwood*	2,802	48.5	−6.2
Conservative	J. Grantham	2,703	46.8	−7.9
Majority		126	2.2	
Turnout		5,776		
Liberal gain from Conservative		Swing		
Liberal gain from Conservative		Swing		

==== November 1874 ====
1874
Party	Candidate	Votes	%	±%
Conservative	H. Shaw*	uncontested		
Liberal	W. Smith*	uncontested		
Conservative hold		Swing		
Liberal hold		Swing		

==== November 1875 ====
1875
Party	Candidate	Votes	%	±%
Liberal	C. Rowley	2,906	52.1	N/A
Liberal	G. Howarth	2,805	50.3	N/A
Conservative	W. G. Bennett*	2,725	48.9	N/A
Conservative	W. H. Hughes	2,715	48.7	N/A
Majority		80	1.4	N/A
Turnout		5,575		
Liberal gain from Conservative		Swing		
Liberal gain from Conservative		Swing		

==== November 1876 ====
1876
Party	Candidate	Votes	%	±%
Liberal	C. Stewart*	2,913	50.9	−1.2
Liberal	T. Bright*	2,895	50.6	−1.5
Conservative	T. Greenwood	2,643	46.2	−2.7
Conservative	W. G. Bennett	2,564	44.8	−3.9
Majority		252	4.4	+3.0
Turnout		5,719		
Liberal hold		Swing		
Liberal hold		Swing		

==== November 1877 ====
1877
Party	Candidate	Votes	%	±%
Conservative	H. Shaw*	uncontested		
Liberal	W. Smith*	uncontested		
Conservative hold		Swing		
Liberal hold		Swing		

==== November 1878 ====
1878
Party	Candidate	Votes	%	±%
Liberal	G. Howarth*	uncontested		
Liberal	C. Rowley*	uncontested		
Liberal hold		Swing		
Liberal hold		Swing		

==== November 1879 ====
1879
Party	Candidate	Votes	%	±%
Liberal	T. Bright*	uncontested		
Liberal	C. Stewart*	uncontested		
Liberal hold		Swing		
Liberal hold		Swing		

=== Elections in 1880s ===
==== November 1880 ====
1880
Party	Candidate	Votes	%	±%
Conservative	H. Shaw*	uncontested		
Liberal	W. Smith*	uncontested		
Conservative hold		Swing		
Liberal hold		Swing		

==== November 1881 ====
1881
Party	Candidate	Votes	%	±%
Liberal	G. Howarth*	uncontested		
Liberal	C. Rowley*	uncontested		
Liberal hold		Swing		
Liberal hold		Swing		

==== November 1882 ====
1882
Party	Candidate	Votes	%	±%
Liberal	T. Bright*	uncontested		
Liberal	C. Stewart*	uncontested		
Liberal hold		Swing		
Liberal hold		Swing		

==== November 1883 ====
1883
Party	Candidate	Votes	%	±%
Liberal	A. McDougall	uncontested		
Conservative	H. Shaw*	uncontested		
Liberal hold		Swing		
Conservative hold		Swing		

==== November 1884 ====
1884
Party	Candidate	Votes	%	±%
Conservative	J. Woodhouse	2,326	59.8	N/A
Conservative	J. Swindells	2,253	57.9	N/A
Liberal	W. Birkbeck	1,611	41.4	N/A
Liberal	H. C. Pingstone	1,594	41.0	N/A
Majority		642	16.5	N/A
Turnout		3,892		
Conservative gain from Liberal		Swing		
Conservative gain from Liberal		Swing		

==== November 1885 ====
1885
Party	Candidate	Votes	%	±%
Conservative	J. Grantham*	uncontested		
Liberal	H. C. Pingstone	uncontested		
Conservative hold		Swing		
Liberal hold		Swing		

==== November 1885 (by-election) ====
By-election: 25 November 1885
Party	Candidate	Votes	%	±%
Conservative	S. Redfern	1,999	61.0	N/A
Independent	T. Nolan	1,277	39.0	N/A
Majority		723	22.0	N/A
Turnout		3,276		
Conservative hold		Swing		

==== November 1886 ====
1886
Party	Candidate	Votes	%	±%
Liberal	R. Lloyd	2,433	51.6	N/A
Liberal	M. Haworth	2,413	51.2	N/A
Conservative	S. Redfern*	2,332	49.4	N/A
Conservative	J. N. Ogden	2,255	47.8	N/A
Majority		81	1.8	N/A
Turnout		4,717		
Liberal gain from Conservative		Swing		
Liberal hold		Swing		

==== November 1887 ====
1887
Party	Candidate	Votes	%	±%
Liberal	H. Aldred	2,695	54.6	+3.0
Liberal	J. B. Fullerton	2,582	52.3	+0.7
Conservative	S. Redfern*	2,346	47.5	−1.9
Conservative	J. Swindells*	2,257	45.7	−3.7
Majority		236	4.8	+3.0
Turnout		4,940		
Liberal gain from Conservative		Swing		
Liberal gain from Conservative		Swing		

==== November 1888 ====
1888
Party	Candidate	Votes	%	±%
Conservative	J. Grantham*	uncontested		
Liberal Unionist	H. C. Pingstone*	uncontested		
Conservative hold		Swing		
Liberal Unionist hold		Swing		

==== November 1889 ====
1889
Party	Candidate	Votes	%	±%
Liberal	R. Lloyd*	2,453	53.5	N/A
Liberal	W. Birkbeck*	2,443	53.3	N/A
Conservative	J. Burgess	2,210	48.2	N/A
Conservative	J. Taylor	2,075	45.2	N/A
Majority		223	4.8	N/A
Turnout		4,586		
Liberal hold		Swing		
Liberal hold		Swing		

=== Elections in 1890s ===
==== November 1890 ====
1890
Party	Candidate	Votes	%	±%
Liberal	H. Aldred*	uncontested		
Liberal	J. B. Fullerton*	uncontested		
Liberal hold		Swing		
Liberal hold		Swing		

==== November 1891 ====
1891
Party	Candidate	Votes	%	±%
Conservative	J. Grantham*	uncontested		
Liberal Unionist	H. C. Pingstone*	uncontested		
Conservative hold		Swing		
Liberal Unionist hold		Swing		

==== November 1892 ====
1892
Party	Candidate	Votes	%	±%
Liberal	W. Birkbeck*	2,000	66.6	N/A
Liberal	R. Lloyd*	1,860	61.9	N/A
Ind. Labour Party	J. Ritson	1,073	35.7	N/A
Majority		787	26.2	N/A
Turnout		3,003		
Liberal hold		Swing		
Liberal hold		Swing		

==== November 1893 ====
1893
Party	Candidate	Votes	%	±%
Liberal	H. Aldred*	1,930	39.1	−27.5
Conservative	W. Holland	1,916	38.8	N/A
Liberal	J. B. Fullerton*	1,784	36.1	−30.5
Conservative	T. Hobson	1,541	31.2	N/A
Ind. Labour Party	J. Ritson	1,356	27.4	−8.3
Majority		132	2.7	
Turnout		4,941		
Liberal hold		Swing		
Conservative gain from Liberal		Swing		

==== June 1894 (by-election) ====
By-election: 21 June 1894
Party	Candidate	Votes	%	±%
Conservative	J. N. Ogden	1,690	42.7	+3.9
Liberal	F. Toomey	1,497	37.8	−1.3
Ind. Labour Party	J. Ritson	769	19.5	−7.9
Majority		193	4.9	+2.2
Turnout		3,956		
Conservative hold		Swing		

==== November 1894 ====
1894
Party	Candidate	Votes	%	±%
Conservative	J. N. Ogden*	1,950	38.5	−0.3
Liberal	D. Boyle	1,938	39.3	−0.8
Liberal	E. M. Powell	1,921	38.0	−1.1
Liberal Unionist	H. C. Pingstone*	1,789	35.3	N/A
Ind. Labour Party	J. Billam	1,261	24.9	−2.5
Majority		17	0.3	
Turnout		5,061		
Conservative hold		Swing		
Liberal gain from Liberal Unionist		Swing		

==== November 1895 ====
1895
Party	Candidate	Votes	%	±%
Liberal	W. Birkbeck*	2,086	60.2	+20.9
Liberal	R. Lloyd*	1,909	55.1	+15.2
Conservative	N. Meadowcroft	1,530	44.2	+5.7
Conservative	J. Barratt	1,402	40.5	+2.0
Majority		379	10.9	+10.6
Turnout		3,464		
Liberal hold		Swing		
Liberal hold		Swing		

==== November 1896 ====
1896
Party	Candidate	Votes	%	±%
Liberal	R. Bishop	2,524	70.3	+10.1
Conservative	W. Holland*	2,329	64.9	+20.7
Ind. Labour Party	G. G Beresford	1,162	32.4	N/A
Majority		1,167	32.5	
Turnout		3,589		
Liberal hold		Swing		
Conservative hold		Swing		

==== November 1897 ====
1897
Party	Candidate	Votes	%	±%
Liberal	D. Boyle*	3,219	61.8	−8.5
Liberal	J. Simpson	2,683	51.5	−18.8
Conservative	J. Grime	2,510	48.2	−16.2
Conservative	J. N. Ogden*	2,008	38.5	−26.4
Majority		173	3.2	
Turnout		5,210		
Liberal hold		Swing		
Liberal gain from Conservative		Swing		

==== November 1898 ====
1898
Party	Candidate	Votes	%	±%
Conservative	J. Grime	2,413	56.9	+8.7
Liberal	W. Birkbeck*	2,145	50.6	−11.2
Conservative	R. G. McCormick	1,984	46.8	−1.4
Liberal	R. Lloyd*	1,935	45.6	−16.2
Majority		161	3.8	+0.6
Turnout		4,239		
Conservative gain from Liberal		Swing		
Liberal hold		Swing		

==== November 1899 ====
1899
Party	Candidate	Votes	%	±%
Liberal	R. Bishop*	2,505	59.3	+8.7
Liberal	M. Grimshaw	2,162	51.2	+0.6
Conservative	W. Holland*	1,897	44.9	−12.0
Conservative	I. Barnes	1,885	44.6	−12.3
Majority		265	6.3	+2.5
Turnout		4,225		
Liberal hold		Swing		
Liberal gain from Conservative		Swing		

=== Elections in 1900s ===
==== November 1900 ====
1900
Party	Candidate	Votes	%	±%
Liberal	D. Boyle*	2,917	63.3	+4.0
Liberal	J. Simpson*	2,914	63.2	+3.9
Conservative	E. G. Simpson	1,708	37.0	−7.9
Conservative	F. B. Smith	1,679	36.4	−8.5
Majority		1,206	26.2	+19.9
Turnout		4,610		
Liberal hold		Swing		
Liberal hold		Swing		

==== December 1900 (by-election) ====
By-election: 11 December 1900
Party	Candidate	Votes	%	±%
Liberal	G. Howarth	uncontested		
Liberal hold		Swing		

==== November 1901 ====
1901
Party	Candidate	Votes	%	±%
Conservative	J. Grime*	uncontested		
Liberal	G. Howarth*	uncontested		
Conservative hold		Swing		
Liberal hold		Swing		

==== November 1902 ====
1902
Party	Candidate	Votes	%	±%
Conservative	N. Meadowcroft	2,602	53.3	N/A
Liberal	R. Bishop*	2,368	48.5	N/A
Liberal	M. Grimshaw*	2,183	44.8	N/A
Majority		185	3.8	N/A
Turnout		4,878		
Conservative gain from Liberal		Swing		
Liberal hold		Swing		

==== December 1902 (by-election) ====
By-election: 1 December 1902
Party	Candidate	Votes	%	±%
Conservative	W. B. Broadhead	2,109	50.3	−3.0
Liberal	M. Grimshaw	2,080	49.7	+1.2
Majority		29	0.6	
Turnout		4,189		
Conservative gain from Liberal		Swing		

==== November 1903 ====
1903
Party	Candidate	Votes	%	±%
Liberal	D. Boyle*	2,817	58.3	+9.8
Liberal	J. Simpson*	2,526	52.2	+3.7
Conservative	J. Burgess	2,163	44.7	−8.6
Majority		363	7.5	+3.7
Turnout		4,835		
Liberal hold		Swing		
Liberal hold		Swing		

==== November 1904 ====
1904
Party	Candidate	Votes	%	±%
Conservative	J. Grime*	uncontested		
Liberal	G. Howarth*	uncontested		
Conservative hold		Swing		
Liberal hold		Swing		

==== November 1905 ====
1905
Party	Candidate	Votes	%	±%
Conservative	N. Meadowcroft*	1,978	53.0	N/A
Labour	T. R. Marr	1,952	52.3	N/A
Liberal	J. Sheldon	1,816	48.7	N/A
Conservative	W. B. Broadhead*	1,711	45.9	N/A
Majority		136	3.6	N/A
Turnout		3,729		
Conservative hold		Swing		
Labour gain from Conservative		Swing		

==== November 1906 ====
1906
Party	Candidate	Votes	%	±%
Conservative	J. Wallwork	2,517	58.2	+5.2
Liberal	D. Boyle*	2,109	48.8	+0.1
Liberal	J. Simpson*	1,505	34.8	−13.9
Majority		604	14.0	
Turnout		4,324		
Conservative gain from Liberal		Swing		
Liberal hold		Swing		

==== November 1907 ====
1907
Party	Candidate	Votes	%	±%
Conservative	J. Grime*	2,460	65.7	+7.5
Liberal	G. Howarth*	1,502	40.1	−8.7
Labour	M. Atherton	1,069	28.5	N/A
Majority		433	11.6	−2.4
Turnout		3,746		
Conservative hold		Swing		
Liberal hold		Swing		

==== November 1908 ====
1908
Party	Candidate	Votes	%	±%
Conservative	N. Meadowcroft*	2,341	63.6	−2.1
Labour	T. R. Marr*	1,374	37.4	+8.9
Independent	J. Sheldon	1,298	35.3	N/A
Majority		76	2.1	
Turnout		3,677		
Conservative hold		Swing		
Labour hold		Swing		

==== November 1908 (by-election) ====
By-election: 24 November 1908
Party	Candidate	Votes	%	±%
Conservative	J. W. J. Cremlyn	2,059	59.8	−3.8
Liberal	J. Masterson	1,162	33.8	N/A
Independent	G. Mason	220	6.4	N/A
Majority		897	26.0	
Turnout		3,441		
Conservative gain from Liberal		Swing		

==== November 1909 ====
1909
Party	Candidate	Votes	%	±%
Conservative	A. Taylor	2,505	71.7	+8.1
Conservative	T. Wilson	1,865	53.4	−10.2
Labour	J. T. Jones	1,427	40.8	+3.4
Labour	J. French	1,193	34.1	−3.3
Majority		438	12.6	
Turnout		3,495		
Conservative hold		Swing		
Conservative hold		Swing		

=== Elections in 1910s ===
==== November 1910 ====
1910
Party	Candidate	Votes	%	±%
Conservative	J. Grime*	2,297	73.7	+2.0
Labour	J. T. Jones	1,401	44.9	+4.1
Liberal	G. Howarth*	1,135	36.4	N/A
Majority		266	8.5	
Turnout		3,117		
Conservative hold		Swing		
Labour gain from Liberal		Swing		

==== November 1911 ====
1911
Party	Candidate	Votes	%	±%
Conservative	N. Meadowcroft*	1,883	63.8	−9.9
Labour	T. R. Marr*	1,599	54.2	+9.3
Conservative	T. Fishwick	1,452	49.2	−24.5
Independent	C. F. Connolly	785	26.6	N/A
Independent	G. Mason	114	3.9	N/A
Labour	W. Newby	65	2.2	−42.7
Majority		147	5.0	−3.5
Turnout		2,950		
Conservative hold		Swing		
Labour hold		Swing		

==== November 1911 (by-election) ====
By-election: 21 November 1911
Party	Candidate	Votes	%	±%
Conservative	J. C. Grime	2,018	64.4	+0.6
Irish Nationalist	C. F. Connolly	1,053	33.6	N/A
Labour	A. Adshead	63	2.0	−52.2
Majority		965	30.8	
Turnout		3,134	54.1	
Conservative hold		Swing		

==== November 1912 ====
1912
Party	Candidate	Votes	%	±%
Conservative	A. Taylor*	2,412	65.6	+1.8
Conservative	C. E. B. Russell	2,122	57.7	−6.1
Liberal	T. P. Fyans	1,408	38.3	N/A
Majority		714	19.4	
Turnout		3,675		
Conservative hold		Swing		
Conservative hold		Swing		

==== November 1913 ====
1913
Party	Candidate	Votes	%	±%
Conservative	J. C. Grime*	2,336	78.4	+12.8
Liberal	G. Howarth	1,481	49.7	+11.4
Labour	J. T. Jones*	1,071	35.9	N/A
Majority		410	13.8	
Turnout		2,980		
Conservative hold		Swing		
Liberal gain from Labour		Swing		

==== November 1913 (by-election) ====
By-election: 21 November 1913
Party	Candidate	Votes	%	±%
Conservative	C. B. Walker	1,755	59.0	−19.4
Labour	F. Lowe	1,218	41.0	+5.1
Majority		537	18.0	
Turnout		2,973	49.8	
Conservative hold		Swing		

==== February 1914 (by-election) ====
By-election: 3 February 1914
Party	Candidate	Votes	%	±%
Conservative	O. R. Whittaker	1,240	53.2	−25.2
Labour	F. Lowe	1,019	43.7	+7.8
British Socialist Party	F. W. Sanderson	73	3.1	N/A
Majority		221	9.5	
Turnout		2,332		
Conservative gain from Liberal		Swing		

==== November 1914 ====
1914
Party	Candidate	Votes	%	±%
Conservative	N. Meadowcroft*	uncontested		
Labour	T. R. Marr*	uncontested		
Conservative hold		Swing		
Labour hold		Swing		

==== November 1919 ====
1919 (3 vacancies; new boundaries)
Party	Candidate	Votes	%	±%
Conservative	A. Taylor*	2,515	80.7	
Liberal	J. Milner	2,102	67.5	
Conservative	J. C. Grime*	2,037	65.4	
Conservative	C. B. Walker*	1,455	46.7	
Women's Party	E. Jones Davies	1,238	39.7	
Majority		582	18.7	
Turnout		3,116	32.8	
Conservative win (new seat)				
Liberal win (new seat)				
Conservative win (new seat)				

=== Elections in 1920s ===
==== November 1920 ====
1920
Party	Candidate	Votes	%	±%
Conservative	J. C. Grime*	3,039	60.1	−5.3
Labour	T. Cunningham	2,017	39.9	N/A
Majority		1,022	20.2	+1.5
Turnout		5,056	53.2	+20.4
Conservative hold		Swing		

==== November 1921 ====
1921
Party	Candidate	Votes	%	±%
Liberal	J. Milner*	2,054	52.1	N/A
Conservative	O. R. Whittaker	1,886	47.9	−12.7
Majority		168	4.2	
Turnout		3,940	42.2	−11.0
Liberal hold		Swing		

==== November 1922 ====
1922
Party	Candidate	Votes	%	±%
Conservative	A. Taylor*	3,457	62.3	+14.4
Labour	E. J. Hookway	2,090	37.7	N/A
Majority		1,367	24.6	
Turnout		5,547	58.5	+16.3
Conservative hold		Swing		

==== November 1923 ====
1923
Party	Candidate	Votes	%	±%
Conservative	J. C. Grime*	3,372	58.3	−4.0
Labour	R. Matthews	2,407	41.7	+4.0
Majority		965	16.6	−8.0
Turnout		5,779		
Conservative hold		Swing		

==== November 1924 ====
1924
Party	Candidate	Votes	%	±%
Labour	R. Matthews	2,855	52.4	+10.7
Liberal	J. Milner*	2,593	47.6	N/A
Majority		262	4.8	
Turnout		5,448		
Labour gain from Liberal		Swing		

==== November 1925 ====
1925
Party	Candidate	Votes	%	±%
Labour	T. M. Larrad	3,223	52.0	−0.4
Conservative	J. Milner*	2,975	48.0	N/A
Majority		248	4.0	−0.8
Turnout		6,198	62.1	
Labour gain from Conservative		Swing		

==== November 1926 ====
1926
Party	Candidate	Votes	%	±%
Labour	W. Hallows	3,500	52.0	0
Conservative	J. C. Grime*	3,182	47.3	−0.7
Residents	J. A. P. Holmes	51	0.8	N/A
Majority		318	4.7	+0.7
Turnout		6,733	66.9	+4.8
Labour gain from Conservative		Swing		

==== November 1927 ====
1927
Party	Candidate	Votes	%	±%
Labour	R. Matthews*	3,365	56.5	+4.5
Conservative	F. Earley	2,594	43.5	−3.8
Majority		771	13.0	+8.3
Turnout		5,959	58.8	−8.1
Labour hold		Swing		

==== November 1928 ====
1928
Party	Candidate	Votes	%	±%
Conservative	S. Fitton	3,504	53.7	+10.2
Labour	T. M. Larrad*	3,025	46.3	−10.2
Majority		479	7.4	
Turnout		6,529	65.0	+6.2
Conservative gain from Labour		Swing		

==== November 1929 ====
1929
Party	Candidate	Votes	%	±%
Labour	W. Hallows*	3,157	57.3	+21.0
Conservative	S. Holmes	2,353	42.7	−21.0
Majority		804	15.0	
Turnout		5,510	50.4	−14.6
Labour hold		Swing		

=== Elections in 1930s ===
==== November 1930 ====
1930
Party	Candidate	Votes	%	±%
Labour	R. Matthews*	3,047	55.6	−1.6
Conservative	B. Walker	2,436	44.4	+1.7
Majority		611	11.2	−3.8
Turnout		5,483		
Labour hold		Swing		

==== November 1931 ====
1931
Party	Candidate	Votes	%	±%
Conservative	S. Fitton*	3,750	51.5	+7.1
Labour	L. M. Lever	3,528	48.5	−7.1
Majority		222	3.0	
Turnout		7,278	67.9	
Conservative hold		Swing		

==== November 1932 ====
1932
Party	Candidate	Votes	%	±%
Labour	W. Hallows*	3,986	63.3	+14.8
Conservative	H. Sumner	2,309	36.7	−14.8
Majority		1,677	26.6	
Turnout		6,295		
Labour hold		Swing		

==== November 1932 (by-election) ====
By-election: 8 November 1932
Party	Candidate	Votes	%	±%
Labour	L. M. Lever	4,206	65.3	2.0
Conservative	H. Sumner	2,235	34.7	−2.0
Majority		1,971	30.6	+4.0
Turnout		6,441		
Labour hold		Swing		

==== November 1933 ====
1933
Party	Candidate	Votes	%	±%
Labour	L. M. Lever*	4,033	73.0	+9.7
Conservative	A. Crossley	1,494	27.0	−9.7
Majority		2,539	46.0	+19.4
Turnout		5,527		
Labour hold		Swing		

==== November 1934 ====
1934
Party	Candidate	Votes	%	±%
Labour	E. Griffiths	3,457	64.1	−8.9
Conservative	S. Fitton*	1,936	35.9	+8.9
Majority		1,521	28.2	−17.8
Turnout		5,393		
Labour gain from Conservative		Swing		

==== November 1935 ====
1935
Party	Candidate	Votes	%	±%
Labour	W. Hallows*	uncontested		
Labour hold		Swing		

==== November 1936 ====
1936
Party	Candidate	Votes	%	±%
Labour	L. M. Lever*	3,286	70.2	N/A
Conservative	F. Blumberg	1,392	29.8	N/A
Majority		1,894	40.4	N/A
Turnout		4,678		
Labour hold		Swing		

==== November 1937 ====
1937
Party	Candidate	Votes	%	±%
Labour	H. J. Delargy	2,634	67.5	−2.7
Conservative	M. Sekian	1,271	32.5	+2.7
Majority		1,363	35.0	−5.4
Turnout		3,905		
Labour hold		Swing		

==== November 1938 ====
1938
Party	Candidate	Votes	%	±%
Labour	M. Knight	1,462	35.4	−32.1
Independent Labour	W. Hallows*	1,418	34.3	N/A
Conservative	B. H. Breeze	1,253	30.3	−2.2
Majority		44	1.1	−33.9
Turnout		4,133		
Labour gain from Independent Labour		Swing		

=== Elections in 1940s ===
==== November 1945 ====
1945
Party	Candidate	Votes	%	±%
Labour	L. M. Lever*	3,011	88.5	+53.1
Independent	J. A. Gannon	393	11.5	N/A
Majority		2,618	76.9	+75.8
Turnout		3,404	39.4	
Labour hold		Swing		

==== November 1946 ====
1946
Party	Candidate	Votes	%	±%
Labour	W. Murray	2,050	71.9	−16.6
Conservative	T. Smith	801	28.1	N/A
Majority		1,249	43.8	−33.1
Turnout		2,851		
Labour hold		Swing		

==== November 1947 ====
1947
Party	Candidate	Votes	%	±%
Labour	M. Knight*	2,350	58.3	−13.6
Conservative	A. Nixon	1,682	41.7	+13.6
Majority		668	16.6	−27.2
Turnout		4,032		
Labour hold		Swing		

==== May 1949 ====
1949
Party	Candidate	Votes	%	±%
Labour	C. Blackwell	2,463	57.6	−0.7
Conservative	D. Edwards	1,812	42.4	+0.7
Majority		651	15.2	−1.4
Turnout		4,275		
Labour hold		Swing		

=== Elections in 1950s ===
==== May 1950 ====
1950 (new boundaries)
Party	Candidate	Votes	%	±%
Labour	W. Murray*	2,748	58.4	
Conservative	D. J. Edwards	1,954	41.6	
Majority		794	16.8	
Turnout		4,702		
Labour hold		Swing		

==== May 1951 ====
1951
Party	Candidate	Votes	%	±%
Labour	M. Knight*	2,456	55.6	−2.8
Conservative	J. M. Connolly	1,850	41.9	+0.3
Independent	F. Dowling	113	2.5	N/A
Majority		606	13.7	−3.1
Turnout		4,419		
Labour hold		Swing		

==== May 1952 ====
1952
Party	Candidate	Votes	%	±%
Labour	C. Blackwell*	3,173	66.6	+11.0
Conservative	E. Griffiths	1,432	30.0	−11.9
Independent	N. Robinson	162	3.4	+0.9
Majority		1,741	36.6	+22.9
Turnout		4,767		
Labour hold		Swing		

==== May 1953 ====
1953
Party	Candidate	Votes	%	±%
Labour	W. Murray*	2,580	65.8	−0.8
Conservative	E. Griffiths	1,339	34.2	+4.2
Majority		1,241	31.6	−5.0
Turnout		3,919		
Labour hold		Swing		

==== May 1954 ====
1954
Party	Candidate	Votes	%	±%
Labour	M. Knight*	2,565	74.3	+8.5
Conservative	K. Corless	889	25.7	−8.5
Majority		1,676	48.6	+17.0
Turnout		3,454		
Labour hold		Swing		

==== May 1955 ====
1955
Party	Candidate	Votes	%	±%
Labour	C. Blackwell*	1,957	65.5	−8.8
Conservative	K. Corless	1,029	34.5	+8.8
Majority		928	31.0	−17.6
Turnout		2,986		
Labour hold		Swing		

==== May 1956 ====
1956 (2 vacancies)
Party	Candidate	Votes	%	±%
Labour	W. Murray*	1,535	71.2	+5.7
Labour	E. Crank	1,450	68.0	+2.5
Conservative	K. Corless	639	30.0	−4.5
Majority		811	38.0	+7.0
Turnout		2,132		
Labour hold		Swing		
Labour hold		Swing		

==== May 1957 ====
1957
Party	Candidate	Votes	%	±%
Labour	E. Crank*	1,526	71.6	+0.4
Conservative	A. Johnson	606	28.4	−1.6
Majority		920	43.2	+5.2
Turnout		2,132		
Labour hold		Swing		

==== May 1958 ====
1958
Party	Candidate	Votes	%	±%
Labour	C. Blackwell*	1,471	77.7	+6.1
Conservative	L. Hampson	421	22.3	−6.1
Majority		1,050	55.4	+12.2
Turnout		1,892		
Labour hold		Swing		

==== May 1959 ====
1959
Party	Candidate	Votes	%	±%
Labour	W. Murray*	1,251	76.0	−1.7
Conservative	M. Buckley	396	24.0	+1.7
Majority		855	52.0	−3.4
Turnout		1,647		
Labour hold		Swing		

=== Elections in 1960s ===
==== May 1960 ====
1960
Party	Candidate	Votes	%	±%
Labour	E. Crank*	886	70.7	−5.3
Conservative	F. Hargreaves	368	29.3	+5.3
Majority		518	41.4	−10.6
Turnout		1,254		
Labour hold		Swing		

==== May 1961 ====
1961
Party	Candidate	Votes	%	±%
Labour	C. Blackwell*	1,238	73.2	+2.5
Conservative	F. Hargreaves	454	26.8	−2.5
Majority		784	46.4	+5.0
Turnout		1,692		
Labour hold		Swing		

==== May 1962 ====
1962
Party	Candidate	Votes	%	±%
Labour	W. Murray*	1,238	80.9	+7.7
Conservative	D. C. Cooper	203	13.3	−13.5
Union Movement	J. J. Boyle	88	5.8	N/A
Majority		1,035	67.7	+21.3
Turnout		1,529		
Labour hold		Swing		

==== May 1963 ====
1963
Party	Candidate	Votes	%	±%
Labour	E. Crank*	1,245	82.2	+1.3
Conservative	C. J. Catarall	270	17.8	+4.5
Majority		975	64.4	−3.3
Turnout		1,515		
Labour hold		Swing		

==== May 1964 ====
1964 (2 vacancies)
Party	Candidate	Votes	%	±%
Labour	C. Blackwell*	1,134	78.3	−3.9
Labour	E. Donoghue	1,096	75.7	−6.5
Conservative	P. Thornley	333	23.0	+5.2
Majority		763	52.7	−11.7
Turnout		1,448		
Labour hold		Swing		
Labour hold		Swing		

==== May 1965 ====
1965
Party	Candidate	Votes	%	±%
Labour	E. Donoghue*	845	72.2	−6.1
Conservative	T. E. Murphy	326	27.8	+4.8
Majority		519	44.4	−8.3
Turnout		1,171		
Labour hold		Swing		

==== June 1965 (by-election) ====
By-election: 24 June 1965
Party	Candidate	Votes	%	±%
Labour	R. Latham	1,306	59.3	−12.9
Conservative	T. E. Murphy	898	40.7	+12.9
Majority		408	18.6	−25.8
Turnout		2,204		
Labour hold		Swing		

==== May 1966 ====
1966
Party	Candidate	Votes	%	±%
Labour	E. Crank*	970	74.8	+2.6
Conservative	F. K. Miles	326	25.2	−2.6
Majority		644	49.6	+5.2
Turnout		1,296		
Labour hold		Swing		

==== May 1967 ====
1967
Party	Candidate	Votes	%	±%
Labour	R. Latham*	904	56.0	−18.8
Conservative	J. B. Chapman	711	44.0	+18.8
Majority		193	12.0	−37.6
Turnout		1,615		
Labour hold		Swing		

==== May 1968 ====
1968
Party	Candidate	Votes	%	±%
Labour	E. Donaghue*	903	58.1	+2.1
Conservative	A. Hawkins	650	41.9	−2.1
Majority		253	16.2	+4.2
Turnout		1,553		
Labour hold		Swing		

==== May 1969 ====
1969
Party	Candidate	Votes	%	±%
Labour	E. Crank*	997	66.2	+8.1
Conservative	R. R. E. Sproston	508	33.8	−8.1
Majority		489	32.4	+16.2
Turnout		1,505		
Labour hold		Swing		

=== Elections in 1970s ===
==== May 1970 ====
1970
Party	Candidate	Votes	%	±%
Labour	R. Latham*	1,325	76.8	+10.6
Conservative	R. E. Pysden	400	23.2	−10.6
Majority		925	53.6	+21.2
Turnout		1,725		
Labour hold		Swing		

== See also ==
- Manchester City Council
- Manchester City Council elections
