= John Edward Taylor =

British journalist and publisher (1791–1844)

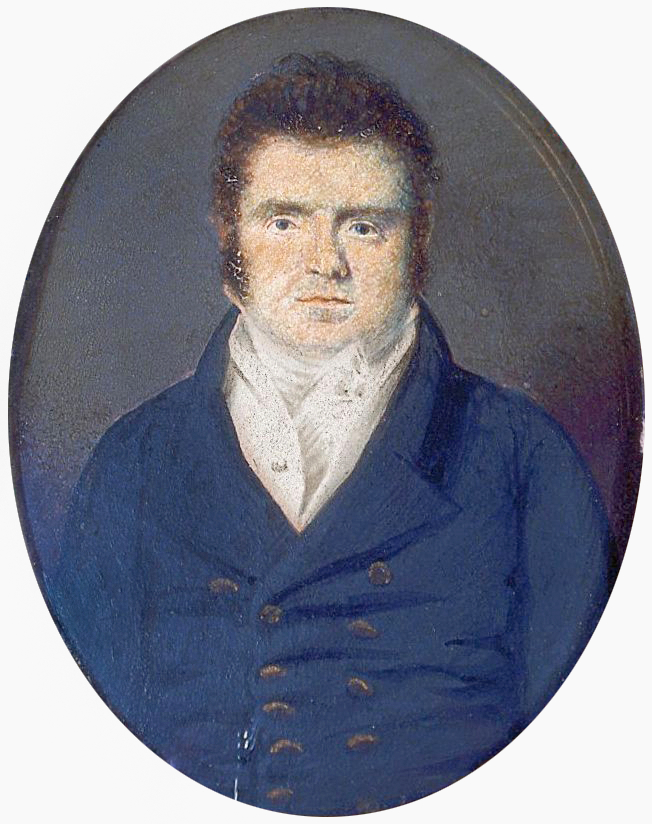
- Born: 11 September 1791; Ilminster, Somerset, England
- Died: 6 January 1844 (aged 52); Cheetham, Manchester, England
- Occupations: Editor and publisher Business tycoon
- Family: Mary Scott (mother), Stanley Jevons (son-in-law)

John Edward Taylor (11 September 1791 – 6 January 1844) was an English business tycoon, editor, publisher and member of The Portico Library, who was the founder of the Manchester Guardian newspaper in 1821. It was renamed in 1959 The Guardian.

== Personal life ==
Taylor was born at Ilminster, Somerset, England, to Mary Scott, the poet, and John Taylor, a Unitarian minister who moved after his wife's death to Manchester with his son to run a school there. John Edward was educated at his father's school and at Daventry Academy. He was apprenticed to a cotton manufacturer in Manchester and later became a successful merchant; Taylor "derived much of his wealth from Manchester’s cotton industry, an industry that relied on firms such as Taylor’s trading with cotton plantations in the Americas that had enslaved millions of Black people".

He was elected to membership of the Manchester Literary and Philosophical Society on 18 April 1828.

His children by his first wife and first cousin Sophia Russell Taylor (née Scott) included a son named after himself and a daughter, Harriet Ann Taylor, who in 1867 married the economist and logician Stanley Jevons.

== Membership of the Little Circle ==
A moderate supporter of reform, from 1815 Taylor was a member of a group of Nonconformist Liberals, meeting in the Manchester home of John Potter, termed the Little Circle. Other members of the group included: Joseph Brotherton (preacher); Archibald Prentice (later editor of the Manchester Times); John Shuttleworth (industrialist and municipal reformer); Absalom Watkin (parliamentary reformer and anti corn law campaigner); William Cowdray Jnr (editor of the Manchester Gazette); Thomas Potter (later first mayor of Manchester) and Richard Potter (later MP for Wigan).

After the death of John Potter, the Potter brothers formed a second Little Circle group, to begin a campaign for parliamentary reform. This called for the better proportional representation in the Houses of Parliament from the rotten boroughs towards the fast-growing industrialised towns of Birmingham, Leeds, Manchester and Salford. After the petition raised on behalf of the group by Absalom Watkin, Parliament passed the Reform Act 1832.

== Manchester Guardian ==
Taylor witnessed the Peterloo massacre in 1819, but was unimpressed by its leaders, writing:

They have appealed not to the reason but to the passions and the suffering of their abused and credulous fellow-countrymen, from whose ill-requited industry they extort for themselves the means of a plentiful and comfortable existence

However, the radical press in Manchester, particularly Manchester Observer supported the protests, and it was not until the Observer was closed by successive police prosecutions that the road was clear for a newspaper closer to Taylor's liberal-minded mill-owning friends.

In 1821, the members of the Little Circle excluding Cowdroy backed John Edward Taylor in founding the Manchester Guardian, published by law only once a week, which Taylor continued to edit until his death.

== Death ==
John Edward Taylor is buried in the Rusholme Road Cemetery (also known as the Dissenters Burial Ground and now Gartside Gardens, in Chorlton-on-Medlock), alongside his first wife Sophia Russell Scott.

== Legacy ==
His younger son, also John Edward Taylor (though usually known as Edward) (1830–1905), became a co-owner of the Manchester Guardian in 1852 and sole owner four years later. He was also editor of the paper from 1861 to 1872. He bought the Manchester Evening News from its founder Mitchell Henry in 1868 and was owner, then co-owner, until his death. He had no children; after his death, the Evening News passed into the hands of his nephews in the Allen family, while the Guardian was sold to its editor, his cousin C. P. Scott.

At least two grandsons, Charles Peter Allen and Arthur Acland Allen, became MPs.

A John Edward Taylor Professorship of English Literature exists at the University of Manchester.

Media offices
Preceded by Jeremiah Garnett	Editor of The Manchester Guardian; 1861 - 1872	Succeeded by C. P. Scott
