= Buile Hill Park =

Park in Salford, Greater Manchester

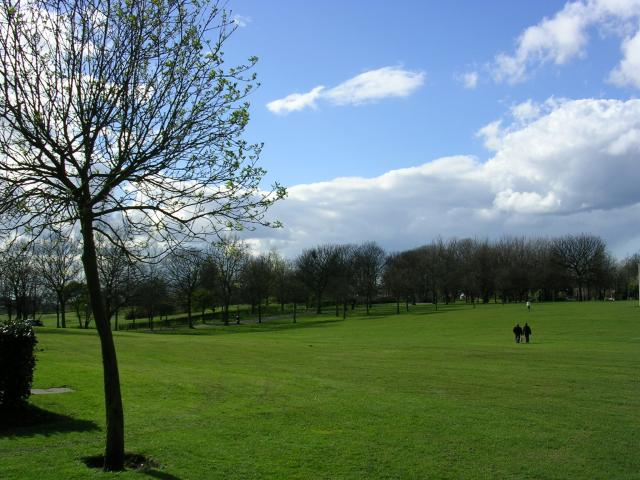
- Interactive map of Buile Hill Park
- Location: Salford, Greater Manchester, England
- Coordinates: 53°29′30″N 2°18′37″W
- Area: 35 hectares (86 acres)
- Created: 1902, expanded in 1903 to incorporate Seedley Park
- Designation: Grade II

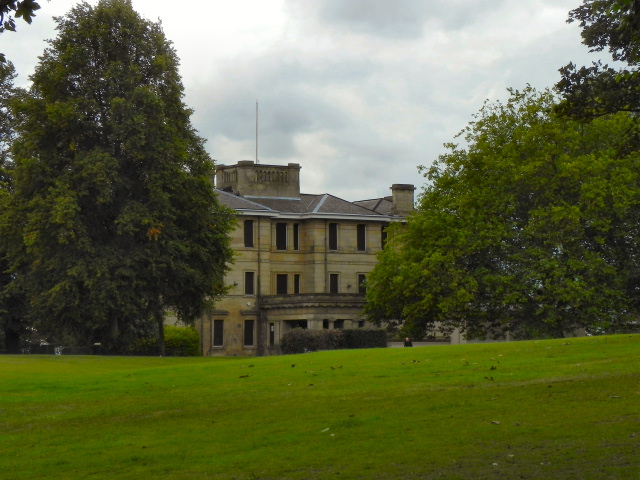
Buile Hill Mansion

Buile Hill Park is a Grade II listed public park in Salford, Greater Manchester, England. Covering 35 hectares (86 acres) it is the largest public park in the city, as well as the second oldest after Peel Park. The park and mansion are owned by Salford City Council. The Friends of Buile Hill Park is a non-profit society which contributes to activities in the park and how it is managed.

== History ==
The park incorporates Seedley Park (opened in 1876) and the grounds of three houses: Buile Hill Mansion (opened as a public park in 1903), Springfield Villa (added in 1927) and Hart Hill house (purchased in 1924 and opened in 1938).

=== Elizabethan era ===
In 1590, victims of the plague were buried in a pit in Hart Hill Meadow, which had been bought by the local authorities. Hart Hill is one of the areas that makes up the modern park, and is found near the junction of Eccles Old Road and Weaste Lane.

=== Georgian era ===
Buile Hill Mansion was built between 1825 and 1827 for Sir Thomas Potter, and was designed by architect Sir Charles Barry.

Potter's father, John Potter of Tadcaster (1728-1802), was firstly a draper. All his children were born in his Tadcaster shop, including Thomas in 1774. John Potter also took on a farm at Wighill then rented another one at Wingate Hill from Sir Walter Vavasour. His sons William and Richard opened a warehouse at No. 2, Cannon Street, Manchester in 1802, which Thomas joined later on 1 January 1803, forming the firm William, Thomas and Richard Potter. William left the firm in 1806. Thomas and Richard Potter formed a small band of free traders and reformers which lasted for more than a quarter of a century. They used to meet in Thomas and Richard's "plotting parlour" situated at the back of their Cannon Street warehouse.

In 1825, Sir Thomas Potter commissioned Sir Charles Barry to build him a mansion at Buile Hill. This is the only known house where Barry used Greek Revival architecture. This was completed in 1827.

Sir Thomas was elected first Mayor of Manchester in 1838 and was re-elected in 1839. He was knighted on 1 July 1840 and died on 20 March 1845 at Buile Hill. His widow, Lady Potter, née Esther Bayley, continued to live at Buile Hill until her death there on 19 June 1852. Their son Thomas Bayley Potter inherited the house and was still running the family business, trading as Messrs Potter & Taylor, in 1865, the year in which he became M.P. for Rochdale after the death of Richard Cobden.

In 1877, Thomas Bayley Potter sold Buile Hill to John Marsland Bennett, timber merchant and local landowner, who had been Mayor of Manchester from 1863-1865.

=== Edwardian era ===
Salford Corporation purchased the Buile Hill estate in 1902 for £20,000. A further £7,000 was allocated for conversion to a public park under the supervision of the Parks Superintendent, A. Wilsher (Salford Reporter, 25 July 1903). Local residents subscribed £2,500 towards the project.

Buile Hill Park was opened on 22 July 1903 by the mayor of Salford, Alderman Stephens, and was subsequently joined to Seedley Park by the closure of the 'Dog Entry' path which divided them.

In 1906, the former Buile Hill House opened to the public as a natural history museum.

In 1906, the tennis courts opened, followed in 1934 by the 18 hole pitch and putt course. In 1938, a cafe was opened in the former Buile Hill estate conservatory.

=== Wartime ===
During both world wars, Buile Hill was used as a military base. In the First World War it became the site of an anti-Zeppelin gun base, while in the Second World War it became home to a barrage balloon attachment. Resultantly, in 1940 the German Luftwaffe dropped a bomb on Buile Hill.

After the end of the war, and an amount of refurbishment, the park reopened to the public in 1948.

=== Post-war era to present day ===
In 1963, a garden for the blind opened, and in 1972 Pets Corner.

In 1975, the Lancashire Museum of Mining opened in Buile Hill Mansion.

The museum closed in 2000, after which the house was proposed to be renovated as a conference centre. However, it remained empty from 2000 to 2026. Planning permission was granted to John Wilkinson to turn it into a country hotel in 2008, which received negative feedback from locals and heritage groups. However, the £700,000 purchase fee was never paid to the council, and the permission expired in 2014. Since then several companies have proposed to turn it into a hotel.

A two-storey derelict outbuilding at the park caught fire in October 2016.

=== Famous visitors ===
People noted to have visited the park include Pendlebury artist L.S. Lowry, a local rent collector, and author Frances Hodgson Burnett who wrote her classic children's novel The Secret Garden during one of her many visits to the estate house.
