= John Shuttleworth (industrialist) =

British businessman (1786–1864)

John Shuttleworth (1786 – 26 April 1864) was an English political activist and campaigner for parliamentary reform in nineteenth century Manchester.

== Life ==
Shuttleworth was born in Manchester. He became a cotton dealer there, and was for a time a business partner of John Edward Taylor.

In 1814 Shuttleworth was a supporter of the Lancasterian school in Manchester; and in 1815 he spoke against the Corn Laws in the year of their introduction at a Manchester meeting. In the following years he was part of the "small determined band" or Little Circle that discussed economics, with Taylor, Archibald Prentice, Absalom Watkin and others. The Manchester Guardian was founded in 1821, and in 1823 Taylor gave up his partnership with Shuttleworth, dealing in cotton, twist and weft, to become its full-time editor. In 1824 the Circle took control of the Manchester Gazette, with Prentice becoming its editor. In 1828 Prentice and the Circle's vehicle shifted to the Manchester Times.

In 1821 Shuttleworth provided support to Rowland Detrosier, finding him work in the factory of the cotton spinner Benjamin Naylor.

He was elected to membership of the Manchester Literary and Philosophical Society on 30 October 1835

Shuttleworth was a Unitarian, a member of the Cross Street Chapel congregation of William Gaskell.
