= Rowland Detrosier =

British politician

Rowland Detrosier, also Rowley Barnes, (c. 1800 – 23 November 1834) was an English autodidact, radical politician, preacher and educator, particularly associated with Manchester.

== Early life ==
Detrosier's parents were Manchester merchant Robert Norris and a French woman named Detrosier. He was born in London but was abandoned. He was then adopted by Charles Barnes, a Swedenborgian tailor who raised him in Hulme, Manchester. Barnes treated him as his own son and named him Rowley.

Before he started work aged nine, Detrosier had received only informal education, including that from the Manchester Benevolent Vegetarian Institute. He worked in a variety of menial jobs and married aged nineteen but managed to teach himself something of French, Latin, mathematics, astronomy, physics, chemistry, botany, and geology. His appetite for learning reduced Detrosier to dire financial straits by 1821 and he was only rescued by the patronage of John Shuttleworth, who found him a more secure and responsible job as a clerk and salesman. At this time, he also discovered his birth parentage.

== Lecturer and preacher ==
Now, Detrosier had even more scope for education. He had lectured on science at Swedenborgian Sunday Schools since he was sixteen and he now travelled widely advocating adult education for working class people. Detrosier was a religious follower of Joseph Brotherton and Brotherton recruited him to preach at the Brinksway Chapel, Stockport where he gained a huge following. In 1827, he was inspired to publish A Form of Public Worship on the Principles of Pure Deism but his deism was too radical for Brotherton who expelled him from his sect.

== Radical ==
In March 1829, Detrosier led a break-away from the Manchester Mechanics' Institute, which he considered to be undemocratic, and established the New Mechanics' Institution. John Doherty sought his help in establishing trade unions but Detrosier was no socialist, believing that democracy posed real dangers unless individual moral development preceded political freedom.

Detrosier attracted the further patronage of Francis Place who established him as a full-time lecturer. Shuttleworth arranged for the 1831 publication of On the Necessity of an Extension of Moral and Political Instruction among the Working Classes and his work attracted the attention of Jeremy Bentham and Anne Isabella Byron, Baroness Byron. In 1831, Detrosier became secretary of the National Political Union whereby he became friends with John Stuart Mill and met Thomas Carlyle, Gustave d'Eichtal, George Birkbeck, and John Arthur Roebuck. Detrosier's new position in the liberal political establishment led him to work with health campaigner Thomas Southwood Smith.

Detrosier lectured on meteorology and pneumatics at the London Mechanics' Institute but was dismissed when he acted as interpreter for Gregorio Fontana and Gioacchino Prati's campaign in England in 1833. However, he found a new sponsor in Robert Mordan and Detrosier made a living lecturing and writing. In 1834, he contracted a common cold and died at his home in London. He left his body to science.

== Bibliography ==
- Kargon, R. H. (1977). Science in Victorian Manchester: Enterprise and Expertise. Baltimore: Johns Hopkins University Press. pp. 22–23. ISBN 0-8018-1969-5.
- Lee, M. (2004) "Detrosier, Rowland (1800?–1834)", Oxford Dictionary of National Biography, Oxford University Press, accessed 10 August 2007 (subscription, Wikipedia Library access or UK public library membership required)
- Styler, W. E. (1949). "Rowland Detrosier". Adult Education. 21: 133–8.
- Williams, G. A. (1965). Rowland Detrosier: A Working Class Infidel, 1800–34. St. Anthony's P. ISBN 0-900701-33-1.
