= Manchester Gazette =

- Owner(s): 1795–1814: William Cowdroy Snr; 1814–1824: William Cowdroy Jnr; 1824–1828:Archibald Prentice
- Founder: William Cowdry Snr
- Publisher: 1795–1814: William Cowdroy Snr; 1814–1824: William Cowdroy Jnr; 1824–1828:Archibald Prentice
- Editor: 1795–1814: William Cowdroy Snr; 1814–1824: William Cowdroy Jnr; 1824–1828:Archibald Prentice
- Founded: 1795
- Political alignment: Conformist non-Tory glish
- Headquarters: Manchester

The Manchester Gazette was a conformist non-Tory newspaper based in Manchester, England.

Founded by William Cowdroy (previously editor of the Chester Chronicle) in 1795, the newspaper was written and printed by him and his four sons. Although considered of poor quality, it sold because it was the only non-Tory newspaper in Manchester.

After the death of William Snr in 1814, his son William Jnr became the new editor. Selling only 250 copies weekly, Cowdroy engaged his non-conformist friends of the first Little Circle to contribute articles. Archibald Prentice, John Shuttleworth and John Edward Taylor all became regular columnists, and by 1819 the Gazette was selling over 1,000 copies a week.

The Gazette had been highly critical of the treatment of the Blanketeers in March 1817, to the extent that it was in return criticised for 'highly libellous' statements, but felt itself vindicated when charges against the alleged ringleaders were dropped in September 1817. In 1819, during the days leading up to the Peterloo massacre, the Gazette compared the authorities' behaviour favourably with that seen in 1817, but did not endorse it:

Upon the present occasion, Government have acted with much greater propriety than in 1817 … but a wise policy would endeavour, rather by temperate and conciliatory conduct, to detach the people at large from those who have assumed the station of their leaders, than to maintain a hollow and insecure tranquillity by the exhibition of military force.

Whilst favouring Reform, the Gazette was highly critical of radicals who it said "live by ranting and railing against abuses" and of their use of mass meetings:

.. the violent resolutions generally passed there – the intemperate harangues of the travelling speechmakers – the very questionable character of many, if not most of these persons – … all these are things which do infinite mischief – which utterly precludes moderate men from wishing them success – and throw all the timid into the ranks of their opponents.

After Peterloo, the first reports to reach London were those of Gazette reporters: its more outspokenly radical contemporary the Manchester Observer had been involved in the organisation of the St Peter's Field meeting; the Observer reporter had been accommodated on the hustings and was consequently arrested with the rest of the hustings party and hence unable to file a report. The subsequent report in the Gazette was (like the account sent to London by its reporters) highly critical of the magistrates, and of their actions. The Gazette said that despite extensive inquiries no witnesses had been found who had heard the Riot Act being read, and therefore it was dubious if the actions were legal. Reporting the first anniversary of Peterloo, it wrote

The anniversary of the 16th of August was observed in many places in this district by Mourning Processions, and by the singing of hymns suited to the occasion. We trust that before the completion of another twelvemonth, the stain, which the melancholy catastrophe of that day last year has impressed upon the page of our annals, will be effaced, and that THO' LATE, JUSTICE WILL AT LENGTH OVERTAKE THE AUTHORS OF THE OUTRAGE

In 1821, the other members of the first Little Circle, dissatisfied with Cowdroy's politics (which they considered insufficiently radical) helped John Edward Taylor (previously a cotton merchant) set up the Manchester Guardian, which he edited for the rest of his life and for which they all wrote. Shortly afterwards, the Manchester Observer, which had responded to Peterloo in less carefully measured language than the Gazette ceased publication, worn down by repeated prosecutions for seditious libel (and the loss of a number of straightforward libel cases). The Observer recommended its readers to transfer their custom to the Guardian

In 1822, the younger Cowdroy died, and ownership of the newspaper passed to his wife. In 1824, after circulation had been struggling for a period, Richard Potter and John Shuttleworth assisted the then editor Archibald Prentice to raise the £1,600 required to buy the Gazette from Cowdroy's wife. Prentice made the Gazette more Radical than the Guardian, calling for repeal of the Corn Law and of the Combination Acts, arguing that the existing Poor Laws were not leading to an increase in pauperism or in poor rates, and that a Poor Law for Ireland would moderate the flow of destitute Irish into England (and specifically Manchester). In 1825, the Manchester Courier reported the trial of an Irish labourer charged with stealing a copy of the Gazette from a pub, describing the paper as "admirably adapted to the capabilities of Irish hodmen and the mass of the canaille who constitute its readership". Prentice struggled against the now established reformist agenda of the Guardian, and in 1828 went bankrupt forcing sale of the Gazette which closed in May 1829, the Manchester Advertiser offering the poor pun that "The Gazette was in its best days always poorly, owing, in great part, we believe, to some original constitutional infirmity..."

In October 1828, Prentice began publication of a new paper; the Manchester Times: "The Manchester Gazette, which I conducted for four years has passed from me into the hands of persons who are strangers to the town, its feelings, and its interests, and I am on the point of establishing a new Journal, to be named the Manchester Times". He later bought the title of the defunct Gazette, the Manchester Times becoming for a while the Manchester Times and Gazette
