= 1844 Manchester Borough Council election =

Local election in Manchester

- 1 November 1844

16 of 64 seats to Manchester Borough Council 33 seats needed for a majority
	First party	Second party
Party	Liberal	Conservative
Last election	17 seats, 90.3%	did not contest
Seats before	64	0
Seats won	13	3
Seats after	61	3
Seat change	▼3	N/A
Popular vote	558	796
Percentage	40.3%	57.4%
Swing	▼59.7%	N/A
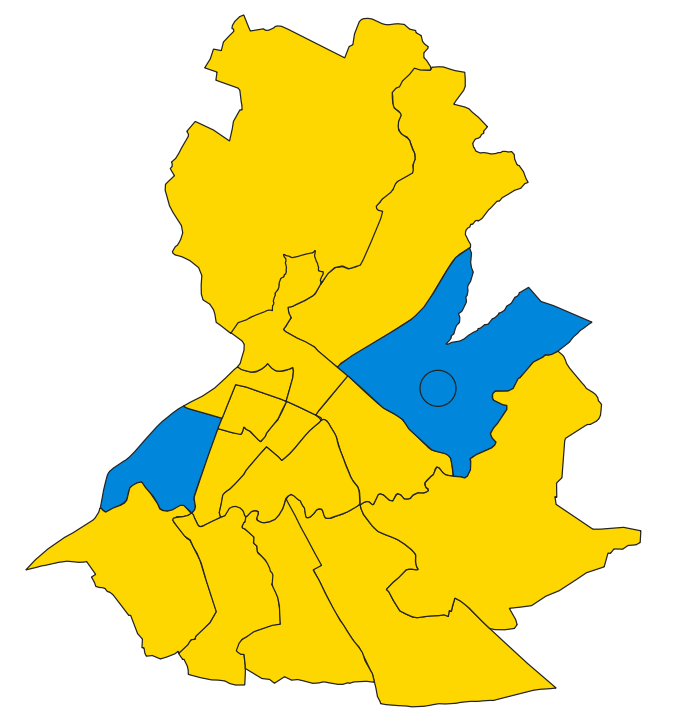
- Map of results of 1844 election
Leader of the Council before election
Liberal
Leader of the Council after election
Liberal

Elections to Manchester Borough Council were held on Friday, 1 November 1844. One third of the councillors seats were up for election, with each successful candidate to serve a three-year term of office. The Conservative anti-corporators contested municipal elections for the first time, winning three seats.

The Liberal incorporators retained overall control of the council.

== Election result ==
Party	Votes		Seats			Full Council	
Liberal Party	558 (40.3%)	▼59.7	13 (81.3%)	13 / 16	▼3	61 (95.3%)	61 / 64
Conservative Party	796 (57.4%)	N/A	3 (18.7%)	3 / 16	N/A	3 (4.7%)	3 / 64
Radical	32 (2.3%)	N/A	0 (0.0%)	0 / 16	N/A	0 (0.0%)	0 / 64

=== Full council ===
↓
61	3

=== Aldermen ===
↓
16

=== Councillors ===
↓
45	3

== Ward results ==
=== All Saints' ===
All Saints'
Party	Candidate	Votes	%	±%
Liberal	Sidney Potter	uncontested		
Liberal hold		Swing		

=== Ardwick ===
Ardwick
Party	Candidate	Votes	%	±%
Liberal	Henry Lees	uncontested		
Liberal hold		Swing		

=== Cheetham ===
Cheetham
Party	Candidate	Votes	%	±%
Liberal	Thomas Diggles*	uncontested		
Liberal hold		Swing		

=== Collegiate Church ===
Collegiate Church
Party	Candidate	Votes	%	±%
Liberal	Joseph Sutcliffe	uncontested		
Liberal hold		Swing		

=== Exchange ===
Exchange
Party	Candidate	Votes	%	±%
Liberal	Thomas Goadsby*	uncontested		
Conservative	William Gibb	no votes		
Liberal hold		Swing		

=== Medlock Street ===
Medlock Street
Party	Candidate	Votes	%	±%
Liberal	John Chapman*	uncontested		
Liberal hold		Swing		

=== New Cross ===
New Cross
Party	Candidate	Votes	%	±%
Conservative	Thomas Lewis Williams	241	60.1	N/A
Conservative	George Peel	230	57.4	N/A
Liberal	John Woolfall	153	38.2	N/A
Liberal	William Howarth	146	36.4	N/A
Radical	John Hewitt	32	8.0	N/A
Majority		77	19.2	N/A
Turnout		401		
Conservative gain from Liberal		Swing		
Conservative gain from Liberal		Swing		

=== Oxford ===
Oxford
Party	Candidate	Votes	%	±%
Liberal	Thomas Gatenby*	uncontested		
Liberal hold		Swing		

=== St. Ann's ===
St. Ann's
Party	Candidate	Votes	%	±%
Liberal	John Shawcross	uncontested		
Liberal hold		Swing		

=== St. Clement's ===
St. Clement's
Party	Candidate	Votes	%	±%
Liberal	Robert George Stracey*	uncontested		
Liberal hold		Swing		

=== St. George's ===
St. George's
Party	Candidate	Votes	%	±%
Liberal	Frederick Watson	uncontested		
Liberal hold		Swing		

=== St. James' ===
St. James'
Party	Candidate	Votes	%	±%
Liberal	David Ainsworth*	uncontested		
Liberal hold		Swing		

=== St. John's ===
St. John's
Party	Candidate	Votes	%	±%
Conservative	John Woollam	151	65.9	N/A
Liberal	John Simpson	78	34.1	N/A
Majority		73	31.8	N/A
Turnout		229		
Conservative gain from Liberal		Swing		

=== St. Luke's ===
St. Luke's
Party	Candidate	Votes	%	±%
Liberal	John Mayson*	uncontested		
Liberal hold		Swing		

=== St. Michael's ===
St. Michael's
Party	Candidate	Votes	%	±%
Liberal	George Wilson*	181	51.0	N/A
Conservative	Charles Ashmore	174	49.0	N/A
Majority		7	2.0	N/A
Turnout		355		
Liberal hold		Swing		

== Aldermanic election ==
=== Aldermanic election, 9 November 1844 ===
At the meeting of the council on 9 November 1844, the terms of office of eight aldermen expired.

The following eight were elected by the council as alderman on 9 November 1844 for a term of six years.

Party	Alderman	Ward	Term expires
Liberal	James Bancroft	St. Michael's	1850
Liberal	James Kershaw*	Collegiate Church	1850
Liberal	John Mayson	All Saints'	1850
Liberal	William Neild*	St. Clement's	1850
Liberal	Frederick Phillips	Medlock Street	1850
Liberal	Sir Thomas Potter*	St. James'	1850
Liberal	C. J. S. Walker*	New Cross	1850
Liberal	William Benjamin Watkins	Ardwick	1850

=== Aldermanic election, 29 March 1845 ===
Caused by the death on 20 March 1845 of Alderman Sir Thomas Potter (Liberal, elected as an alderman by the council on 15 December 1838).

In his place, John Potter (Liberal, never a councillor) was elected as an alderman by the council on 29 March 1845.

Party	Alderman	Ward	Term expires
Liberal	John Potter	St. James'	1850
