= Manchester Observer =

Former newspaper in Manchester, England

- Founder(s): John Knight, John Saxton, James Wroe
- Editor: James Wroe
- Founded: 1818
- Ceased publication: 1821
- Political alignment: Non-conformist Liberal
- Headquarters: Manchester

The Manchester Observer was a short-lived non-conformist Liberal newspaper based in Manchester, England. Its radical agenda led to an invitation to Henry "Orator" Hunt to speak at a public meeting in Manchester, which subsequently led to the Peterloo Massacre and the shutdown of the newspaper.

== Background ==
By 1819, the allocation of Parliamentary constituencies did not reflect the distribution of population. The major urban centres of Manchester, Salford, Bolton, Blackburn, Rochdale, Ashton-under-Lyne, Oldham and Stockport, with a combined population of almost one million, were represented only by their county MPs; and very few inhabitants had the vote. Lancashire (in which all the above other than Stockport lay) was represented by two members of parliament (MPs), with voting restricted to the adult male owners of freehold land valued at 40 shillings or more—the equivalent of about £80 as of 2008—and votes could only be cast at the county town of Lancaster, by a public spoken declaration at the hustings. Stockport fell within the county constituency of Cheshire, with the same franchise, but with the hustings held at Chester. Many MPs were returned by "rotten boroughs" (Old Sarum in Wiltshire, with one voter, elected two MPs, as did Dunwich in Suffolk, which by the early 19th century had almost completely disappeared into the sea.) or "closed boroughs" (with more voters, but dependent on a local magnate). More than half of all MPs were elected by boroughs under the control of a total of just 154 proprietors who therefore had a hugely disproportionate influence on the membership of the Parliament of the United Kingdom. These inequalities in political representation led to calls for reform.

== Publication ==
The newspaper was formed by a group of radicals that included John Knight, John Saxton and James Wroe. It pioneered a popularist form of articles, with an editorialship agenda aimed at the growing literate working-class. Within twelve months it was selling 4,000 copies per week to its local audience.

Its style resulted in sales outside its core geography, and by late 1819 it was being sold in most of the booming industrialised cities—Birmingham, Leeds, London, Salford—that were calling for non-conformist reform of the Houses of Parliament. Hunt stated:

The Manchester Observer is the only newspaper in England that I know, fairly and honestly devoted to such reform as would give the people their whole rights.

The articles within the non-conformist agenda, combined with a racy-popularist style, often resulted in the principal journalists—T. J. Evans, John Saxton and James Wroe—constantly being sued for libel. When found guilty, particularly for writing articles critical of Parliament's structure, they were often jailed. This, however, only managed to raise circulation.

But, despite its popularity, association with its radical agenda was seen as bad for sales by traditionalist conformist-Tory business people, and hence advertising revenue was low. Resultantly, with often only one of its 24 columns filled by adverts, the Observer was always in financial difficulties.

== Peterloo Massacre ==
At the start of 1819, Joseph Johnson, John Knight and James Wroe all of the Manchester Observer formed the Patriotic Union Society (PUS). All the leading radicals and reformists in Manchester joined the organisation, including members of the Little Circle. The objective of the PUS was to obtain parliamentary reform.

PUS decided to invite Henry "Orator" Hunt and Major John Cartwright to speak at a public meeting in Manchester, about the national agenda of Parliamentary reform, and the local agenda to gain two MPs for Manchester and one for Salford. To avoid the police or courts banning the meeting, PUS stated on all its materials as did the Observer in articles and editorial that it was "a meeting of the county of Lancashire, than of Manchester alone."

Following the massacre, Wroe as then editor of the Observer was the first journalist to describe the incident at the Peterloo Massacre, taking his headline from the Battle of Waterloo that had taken place only four years before. Wroe subsequently wrote pamphlets entitled "The Peterloo Massacre: A Faithful Narrative of the Events". Priced at 2d each, they sold out each print run for 14 weeks, having a large national circulation. Saxton, having been on the hustings with Hunt, was arrested and imprisoned. He stood trial with Hunt at York Assizes, but his defence that he was present as a reporter, not as a participant in the meeting, let alone a member of the hustings party, was successful.

On 28 August the Observer printed an article claiming that Manchester Royal Infirmary had been emptied of patients, including one whose leg had been amputated the previous day, before the massacre to prepare to receive the wounded, and that all the surgeons had been summoned to attend on 16th. This was held to be evidence that "something was previously arranged". The Board of the infirmary vigorously denied this. The only amputee discharged on 16th had been in the hospital for 6 weeks since his amputation.

== Closure by repeated prosecution ==
The Liverpool government instigated repeated prosecutions of the Manchester Observer and those associated with it. Vendors of the Manchester Observer were prosecuted for seditious libel, and a total of fifteen charges of seditious libel were brought against Wroe, his wife and his two brothers. Publication of the Observer was temporarily suspended in February 1820, when Wroe relinquished ownership of the copyright, but resumed under the last proprietor of the Manchester Observer (Thomas John Evans). On trial Wroe was found guilty on two specimen charges, all the other charges against him, against his wife and his brothers being allowed to lie, provided the publication of libels ceased. On one charge he was sentenced to six months imprisonment and fined £100; on the other he was given a further six months, and bound over to keep the peace for two years, to give a surety of £200 and to find two other sureties of £50 each. The specimen charges related not to anything in the Observer, but to articles in Sherwin's Weekly Political Register, which Wroe had sold.

The sentences were said to have been reduced because of the distressed state of the Wroes: his successor Evans was subsequently (June 1821) convicted on one charge of seditious libel (and one of libel on a private individual) by the Observer, imprisoned for eighteen months and bound over for three years in the sum of £400, two other sureties of £200 to be found. By then the 11 members of the first Little Circle excluding William Cowdroy Jnr. of the Manchester Gazette had helped a then cotton merchant John Edward Taylor found The Manchester Guardian (Taylor was editor of the Guardian until his death, following a liberal agenda, and the Little Circle members wrote for it); the Manchester Observer had ceased publication, its final editorial recommending its readers to read the recently founded Manchester Guardian:

I would respectfully suggest that the Manchester Guardian, combining principles of complete independence, and zealous attachment to the cause of reform, with active and spirited management, is a journal in every way worthy of your confidence and support.
