= Archibald Prentice =

Scottish journalist

Archibald Prentice (1792–1857) was a Scottish journalist, known as a radical reformer and temperance campaigner.

== Life ==
The son of Archibald Prentice of Covington Mains in the Upper Ward of Lanarkshire, and Helen, daughter of John Stoddart of The Bank, a farm in the parish of Carnwath, he was born in November 1792. After a scanty education, he was apprenticed at age 12 to a baker in Edinburgh; but then the following summer (1805) to a woollen-draper in the Lawnmarket. Here he remained for three years, then moved to Glasgow as a clerk in the warehouse of Thomas Grahame, brother of James Grahame the poet. Two years later he was appointed traveller to the house in England, and in 1815 Grahame, acting on his advice, moved his business from Glasgow to Manchester, and at the same time brought Prentice into partnership in the firm.

He was elected to membership of the Manchester Literary and Philosophical Society on 22 January 1819

== Journalism ==
Prentice took an interest in politics, and contributed to Cowdroy's Gazette, a weekly. In May 1821 the Manchester Guardian was founded as an organ of radical opinion. Some, including Prentice, found John Edward Taylor as editor insufficiently advanced; Prentice purchased Cowdroy's Gazette to start an alternative paper. In June 1824, the first number of the renamed Manchester Gazette appeared under his editorship.

The year 1826 saw a commercial depression, and Prentice found himself unable to keep the paper afloat. The Gazette was then incorporated with the Manchester Times and he was appointed sole manager of the new paper, the first number of which appeared on 17 October 1828. His handling the paper was controversial, and on 14 July 1831 an action for libel was brought against him by one Captain Grimshawe, of whom he had said that he gave indecent toasts at public dinners. On indictment Prentice was acquitted, and was presented with a silver snuff-box.

His newspaper ventures were to prove unsuccessful. Biographer Paul Ziegler says that

Although his newspapers turned a profit in their early years, his single-minded use of them for reformist causes, to the exclusion of lighter and more attractive features, drove down circulation, and his propagandizing alienated many. This partly explains the Manchester Gazette's failure in 1828 and the subsequent inability of the Manchester Times to compete with John Bright's more moderate Manchester Examiner.

== Corn law activist ==
Towards the close of 1836 an anti-corn-law association was started in London by Joseph Hume and other parliamentary radicals; Prentice suggested that the centre of agitation should be transferred to Manchester. On 24 September 1838 prominent Manchester merchants met him at the York Hotel, and the result was the foundation of the Anti-Corn-Law League. For the next eight years he devoted himself to the propagation of free trade principles. His paper came to be an organ for the advancement of the movement. Prentice recruited Abraham Walter Paulton as the League's first lecturer.

George Wilson came to play a role as moderator of the radical tactics of Prentice, who did not hold a prominent official position in the League, and who fell out with Richard Cobden. A company was formed in 1845 to run another radical paper, the Manchester Examiner, at the initiative of William McKerrow. The new venture had a major impact on the Manchester Times; and in 1847 Prentice sold out his stake in the paper. In the following year the two publications became the Manchester Examiner and Times. John Childs regarded Prentice as unfairly treated, as a committed activist.

== Later life ==
Prentice visited the United States in 1848. On his return he obtained an appointment in the Manchester gas office, and continued to write. An advocate of temperance principles, he became latterly an ardent apostle of total abstinence, and on the formation of the Manchester Temperance League in 1857, he became treasurer. One of his last lectures was on the bacchanalian songs of Robert Burns.

Prentice became paralysed, on 22 December 1857, and died two days later in his sixty-seventh year.

== Works ==
Prentice published Tour in the United States, in a cheap form in order to promote emigration. He edited in 1822 The Life of Alexander Reid, a Scotish [sic] Covenanter, and was the author of Historical Sketches and Personal Recollections of Manchester, published in 1851, and A History of the Anti-Corn-Law League, London, 1853.

== Family ==
Prentice married, on 3 June 1819, Jane, daughter of James Thomson of Oatridge, near Linlithgow. She survived him many years, and was buried by his side in the Rusholme Road cemetery, Manchester.
