= Manchester Times =

Former newspaper published in Manchester, England

The Manchester Times was a weekly newspaper published in Manchester, England, from 1828 to 1922. It was known for its free trade radicalism.

From 1828 to 1847, the newspaper was edited by Archibald Prentice, a political radical and advocate of free trade. After swallowing the Manchester Gazette, the paper took the title Manchester Times and Gazette in 1831. In 1835 the paper published a series of letters by Richard Cobden, and Prentice subsequently made it a mouthpiece for the Anti–Corn Law League.

In 1849, the paper merged with the Manchester Examiner, recently founded as a radical competitor after a falling-out between Prentice and Cobden, and became the Manchester Examiner and Times. The Examiner had been founded by the young Edward Watkin, whose father was noted for his involvement in the Anti–Corn Law League. Briefly known as the Manchester Weekly Examiner & Times in 1856–57, the paper settled down under the title Manchester Weekly Times and Examiner (or simply Manchester Weekly Times) in 1858.

The newspaper's last issue appeared on 22 July 1922.

The 3,973 issues of the Manchester Times, published between 1828 and 1900, are available to read in digitised form at the British Newspaper Archive.
