= 1957 Manchester City Council election =

Local election in Manchester, England

- 9 May 1957

38 of 152 seats to Manchester City Council 77 seats needed for a majority
	First party	Second party	Third party
Party	Labour	Conservative	Liberal
Last election	28 seats, 53.1%	14 seats, 43.0%	0 seats, 3.1%
Seats before	88	61	3
Seats won	24	14	0
Seats after	89	60	3
Seat change	▲1	▼1	Steady
Popular vote	85,104	65,947	6,653
Percentage	53.7%	41.6%	4.2%
Swing	▲0.6%	▼1.4%	▲1.1%
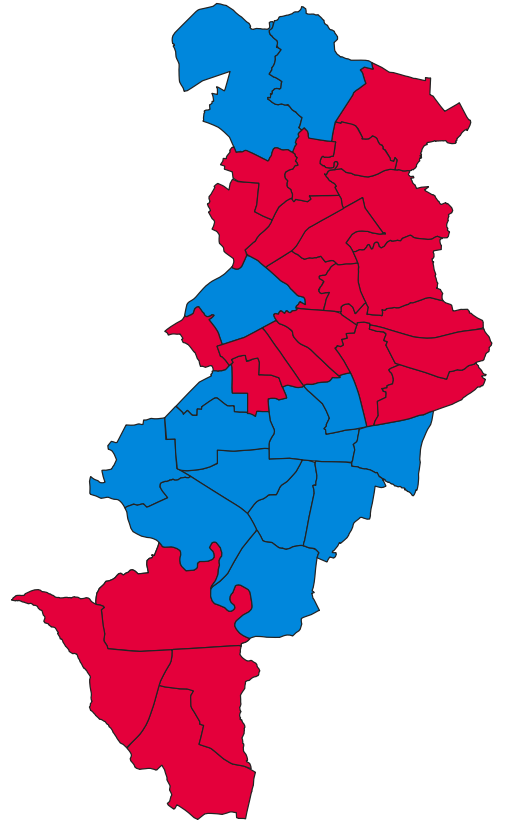
- Map of results of 1957 election
Leader of the Council before election
Labour
Leader of the Council after election
Labour

Elections to Manchester City Council were held on Thursday, 9 May 1957. One third of the councillors seats were up for election, with each successful candidate to serve a three-year term of office. The Labour Party retained overall control of the council.

== Election result ==
Party	Votes		Seats			Full Council	
Labour Party	85,104 (53.7%)	▲0.6	24 (63.1%)	24 / 38	▲1	89 (58.6%)	89 / 152
Conservative Party	65,947 (41.6%)	▼1.4	14 (36.8%)	14 / 38	▼1	60 (39.5%)	60 / 152
Liberal Party	6,653 (4.2%)	▲1.1	0 (0.0%)	0 / 38	Steady	3 (2.0%)	3 / 152
Independent	493 (0.3%)	Steady	0 (0.0%)	0 / 38	Steady	0 (0.0%)	0 / 152
Communist	332 (0.2%)	▼0.3	0 (0.0%)	0 / 38	Steady	0 (0.0%)	0 / 152

=== Full council ===
↓
89	3	60

=== Aldermen ===
↓
21	3	14

=== Councillors ===
↓
68	46

== Ward results ==
=== Alexandra Park ===
Alexandra Park
Party	Candidate	Votes	%	±%
Conservative	N. Thompson	3,107	53.9	−6.1
Liberal	G. E. Sharpe	1,487	25.8	+3.2
Labour	A. A. Dandy	1,166	20.3	+2.9
Majority		1,620	28.1	−9.3
Turnout		5,760		
Conservative hold		Swing		

=== All Saints' ===
All Saints'
Party	Candidate	Votes	%	±%
Labour	F. Hatton*	2,224	70.8	+6.5
Conservative	W. J. Geddes	917	29.2	−8.1
Majority		1,307	41.6	+17.8
Turnout		3,141		
Labour hold		Swing		

=== Ardwick ===
Ardwick
Party	Candidate	Votes	%	±%
Labour	F. Taylor*	2,461	70.4	+7.2
Conservative	G. Jackson	1,033	29.6	−7.2
Majority		1,428	40.8	+14.4
Turnout		3,494		
Labour hold		Swing		

=== Baguley ===
Baguley
Party	Candidate	Votes	%	±%
Labour	J. Stuart-Cole*	3,485	60.0	+0.8
Conservative	R. J. Payne	2,325	40.0	−0.8
Majority		1,160	20.0	+1.6
Turnout		5,810		
Labour hold		Swing		

=== Barlow Moor ===
Barlow Moor
Party	Candidate	Votes	%	±%
Conservative	H. Harker*	1,727	57.8	−2.9
Labour	S. E. Tucker	1,263	42.2	+2.0
Majority		464	15.6	−4.0
Turnout		2,990		
Conservative hold		Swing		

=== Benchill ===
Benchill
Party	Candidate	Votes	%	±%
Labour	R. L. Griffiths*	2,710	58.6	+0.7
Conservative	E. Birley	1,911	41.4	+2.4
Majority		799	17.2	+1.0
Turnout		4,621		
Labour hold		Swing		

=== Beswick ===
Beswick
Party	Candidate	Votes	%	±%
Labour	T. W. Farrell*	3,013	84.8	+7.6
Conservative	W. M. Hall	541	15.2	−9.9
Majority		2,472	69.6	+22.1
Turnout		3,554		
Labour hold		Swing		

=== Blackley ===
Blackley
Party	Candidate	Votes	%	±%
Conservative	P. Chadwick*	3,301	56.2	−3.1
Labour	A. J. Fahey	2,571	43.8	+3.1
Majority		730	12.4	−6.2
Turnout		5,872		
Conservative hold		Swing		

=== Bradford ===
Bradford
Party	Candidate	Votes	%	±%
Labour	J. Taylor*	3,776	81.8	+6.6
Conservative	A. P. Osborn	841	18.2	−6.6
Majority		2,935	63.6	+13.2
Turnout		4,617		
Labour hold		Swing		

=== Burnage ===
Burnage
Party	Candidate	Votes	%	±%
Conservative	D. J. Edwards*	3,000	55.4	−5.5
Labour	W. S. Spink	2,414	44.6	+5.5
Majority		586	10.8	−11.0
Turnout		5,414		
Conservative hold		Swing		

=== Cheetham ===
Cheetham
Party	Candidate	Votes	%	±%
Labour	R. B. Prain*	1,883	51.0	+0.7
Liberal	S. Needoff	1,807	49.0	+14.9
Majority		76	2.0	−14.2
Turnout		3,690		
Labour hold		Swing		

=== Chorlton-cum-Hardy ===
Chorlton-cum-Hardy
Party	Candidate	Votes	%	±%
Conservative	S. Ralphs*	3,168	73.0	−10.1
Labour	R. P. Greenwood	1,169	27.0	+10.1
Majority		1,999	46.0	−20.2
Turnout		4,337		
Conservative hold		Swing		

=== Collegiate Church ===
Collegiate Church
Party	Candidate	Votes	%	±%
Labour	R. Finkel*	1,613	85.3	+5.9
Conservative	F. Hargreaves	189	10.0	−2.6
Communist	M. I. Druck	90	4.7	−3.3
Majority		1,424	75.3	+8.5
Turnout		1,892		
Labour hold		Swing		

=== Crumpsall ===
Crumpsall
Party	Candidate	Votes	%	±%
Conservative	E. Mawdsley*	3,162	53.2	−3.5
Labour	K. Franklin	2,785	46.8	+3.5
Majority		377	6.4	−7.0
Turnout		5,947		
Conservative hold		Swing		

=== Didsbury ===
Didsbury
Party	Candidate	Votes	%	±%
Conservative	W. White*	2,633	53.3	−3.2
Liberal	M. MacInerney	1,802	35.8	+2.9
Labour	J. Platt	629	12.5	+0.9
Majority		831	16.1	−6.5
Turnout		5,064		
Conservative hold		Swing		

=== Gorton North ===
Gorton North
Party	Candidate	Votes	%	±%
Labour	P. Roddy*	3,567	75.7	+3.6
Conservative	B. H. Farrow	1,142	24.3	−3.6
Majority		2,425	51.4	+7.2
Turnout		4,709		
Labour hold		Swing		

=== Gorton South ===
Gorton South
Party	Candidate	Votes	%	±%
Labour	E. Kirkman*	2,229	68.3	−0.4
Conservative	T. Brownrigg	1,033	31.7	+0.4
Majority		1,196	36.6	−0.8
Turnout		3,262		
Labour hold		Swing		

=== Harpurhey ===
Harpurhey
Party	Candidate	Votes	%	±%
Labour	A. O'Toole*	2,702	64.2	+6.2
Conservative	J. C. Brearley	1,504	35.8	−6.2
Majority		1,198	28.4	+12.4
Turnout		4,206		
Labour hold		Swing		

=== Hugh Oldham ===
Hugh Oldham
Party	Candidate	Votes	%	±%
Labour	S. Humphris*	2,476	85.9	+13.1
Conservative	J. Jones	303	10.5	−9.9
Communist	E. Cohen	103	3.6	−3.2
Majority		2,173	75.4	+23.0
Turnout		2,882		
Labour hold		Swing		

=== Levenshulme ===
Levenshulme
Party	Candidate	Votes	%	±%
Conservative	O. Lodge*	2,748	64.1	−1.2
Labour	D. Barker	1,536	35.9	+1.2
Majority		1,212	28.2	−2.4
Turnout		4,284		
Conservative hold		Swing		

=== Lightbowne ===
Lightbowne
Party	Candidate	Votes	%	±%
Labour	G. Halstead	2,889	43.0	+3.9
Conservative	D. Piggott*	2,852	42.5	−7.9
Liberal	F. N. Wedlock	973	14.5	+4.0
Majority		37	0.5	
Turnout		6,714		
Labour gain from Conservative		Swing		

=== Longsight ===
Longsight
Party	Candidate	Votes	%	±%
Conservative	F. J. Dunn*	2,217	52.9	−4.1
Labour	J. Davis	1,977	47.1	+4.1
Majority		240	5.8	−8.2
Turnout		4,194		
Conservative hold		Swing		

=== Miles Platting ===
Miles Platting
Party	Candidate	Votes	%	±%
Labour	J. H. F. Eccles*	1,809	69.5	+0.2
Conservative	M. V. Sparks	794	30.5	−0.2
Majority		1,015	39.0	+0.4
Turnout		2,603		
Labour hold		Swing		

=== Moss Side East ===
Moss Side East
Party	Candidate	Votes	%	±%
Labour	E. Dell*	2,266	61.6	+5.9
Conservative	H. Boff	1,415	38.4	−3.9
Majority		851	23.2	+9.8
Turnout		3,681		
Labour hold		Swing		

=== Moss Side West ===
Moss Side West
Party	Candidate	Votes	%	±%
Conservative	L. Lescure	2,242	45.8	+0.6
Labour	K. Pollitt*	2,163	44.2	−1.1
Independent	G. J. Playford	493	10.0	+0.5
Majority		79	1.6	
Turnout		4,898		
Conservative gain from Labour		Swing		

=== Moston ===
Moston
Party	Candidate	Votes	%	±%
Labour	R. Latham*	3,490	54.5	+0.9
Conservative	R. B. Crompton	2,908	45.5	−0.9
Majority		582	9.0	+1.8
Turnout		6,398		
Labour hold		Swing		

=== New Cross ===
New Cross
Party	Candidate	Votes	%	±%
Labour	E. Crank*	1,526	71.6	+0.4
Conservative	A. Johnson	606	28.4	−1.6
Majority		920	43.2	+5.2
Turnout		2,132		
Labour hold		Swing		

=== Newton Heath ===
Newton Heath
Party	Candidate	Votes	%	±%
Labour	W. Binns*	2,698	71.8	+2.3
Conservative	E. Collingwood	1,062	28.2	−2.3
Majority		1,636	43.6	+4.6
Turnout		3,760		
Labour hold		Swing		

=== Northenden ===
Northenden
Party	Candidate	Votes	%	±%
Labour	J. S. Goldstone	3,424	52.2	+0.6
Conservative	C. G. Tilley	3,135	47.8	−0.6
Majority		289	4.4	+1.2
Turnout		6,559		
Labour gain from Conservative		Swing		

=== Old Moat ===
Old Moat
Party	Candidate	Votes	%	±%
Conservative	C. A. Earley*	1,832	50.2	−6.1
Labour	H. Conway	1,237	33.9	+5.8
Liberal	R. H. Hargreaves	584	15.9	+0.3
Majority		595	16.3	−11.9
Turnout		3,653		
Conservative hold		Swing		

=== Openshaw ===
Openshaw
Party	Candidate	Votes	%	±%
Labour	S. Jolly*	3,452	74.7	+3.0
Conservative	E. D. Lowe	1,032	22.3	−1.9
Communist	J. Hodgson	139	3.0	−1.1
Majority		2,420	52.4	+4.9
Turnout		3,623		
Labour hold		Swing		

=== Rusholme ===
Rusholme
Party	Candidate	Votes	%	±%
Conservative	A. T. Barratt*	2,835	66.5	−2.8
Labour	A. H. Green	1,426	33.5	+2.8
Majority		1,409	33.0	−5.6
Turnout		4,261		
Conservative hold		Swing		

=== St. George's ===
St. George's
Party	Candidate	Votes	%	±%
Labour	K. Collis*	1,995	71.8	−2.3
Conservative	J. Logan	783	28.2	+2.3
Majority		1,212	43.6	−4.6
Turnout		2,778		
Labour hold		Swing		

=== St. Luke's ===
St. Luke's
Party	Candidate	Votes	%	±%
Labour	J. Conway*	2,240	55.6	−2.2
Conservative	W. Crabtree	1,792	44.4	+2.2
Majority		448	11.2	−4.4
Turnout		4,032		
Labour hold		Swing		

=== St. Mark's ===
St. Mark's
Party	Candidate	Votes	%	±%
Labour	B. Conlan*	2,621	73.3	+7.4
Conservative	R. Jones	954	26.7	−7.4
Majority		1,667	46.6	+14.8
Turnout		3,575		
Labour hold		Swing		

=== St. Peter's ===
St. Peter's
Party	Candidate	Votes	%	±%
Conservative	N. Beer*	1,344	71.5	−0.1
Labour	C. E. Bedgood	535	28.5	+0.1
Majority		809	43.0	−0.2
Turnout		1,879		
Conservative hold		Swing		

=== Withington ===
Withington
Party	Candidate	Votes	%	±%
Conservative	W. A. Stovell*	2,522	74.9	+3.4
Labour	A. Haslam	844	25.1	−3.4
Majority		1,678	49.8	+6.8
Turnout		3,366		
Conservative hold		Swing		

=== Woodhouse Park ===
Woodhouse Park
Party	Candidate	Votes	%	±%
Labour	C. H. Hall*	3,840	78.7	−0.7
Conservative	F. W. Harrison	1,037	21.3	+0.7
Majority		2,803	57.4	−1.4
Turnout		4,877		
Labour hold		Swing		

== Aldermanic elections ==
=== Aldermanic election, 4 September 1957 ===
Caused by the death on 10 August 1957 of Alderman George Sutton Grindley (Conservative, elected as an alderman by the council on 6 January 1937).

In his place, Councillor Eveline Hill M.P. (Conservative, Didsbury, elected 2 November 1936) was elected as an alderman by the council on 4 September 1957.

Party	Alderman	Ward	Term expires
Conservative	Eveline Hill M.P.	Openshaw	1961

=== Aldermanic election, 8 January 1958 ===
Caused by the resignation on 11 December 1957 of Alderman John Edward Burgess (Conservative, elected as an alderman by the council on 25 May 1949).

In his place, Councillor Lionel Biggs (Conservative, Burnage, elected 19 November 1936) was elected as an alderman by the council on 8 January 1958.

Party	Alderman	Ward	Term expires
Conservative	Lionel Biggs	Didsbury	1961

=== Aldermanic election, 19 February 1958 ===
Caused by the resignation on 19 February 1958 of Alderman Harry Frankland (Labour, elected as an alderman by the council on 31 March 1953).

In his place, Councillor Arthur Donovan (Labour, Hugh Oldham, elected 1 March 1944) was elected as an alderman by the council on 19 February 1958.

Party	Alderman	Ward	Term expires
Labour	Arthur Donovan	Cheetham	1961

== By-elections between 1957 and 1958 ==
=== Didsbury, 17 October 1957 ===
Caused by the election as an alderman of Councillor Eveline Hill M.P. (Conservative, Didsbury, elected 2 November 1936) on 4 September 1957 following the death on 10 August 1957 of Alderman George Sutton Grindley (Conservative, elected as an alderman by the council on 6 January 1937).

Didsbury
Party	Candidate	Votes	%	±%
Liberal	M. MacInerney	2,216	48.0	+12.2
Conservative	W. A. Murray	1,995	43.2	−10.1
Labour	J. Platt	408	8.8	−3.7
Majority		221	4.8	
Turnout		4,619		
Liberal gain from Conservative		Swing		

=== Blackley, 20 February 1958 ===
Caused by the death of Councillor Percy Chadwick (Conservative, Blackley, elected 1 November 1947; previously 1944-45) on 2 December 1957.

Blackley
Party	Candidate	Votes	%	±%
Labour	A. J. Fahey	2,813	54.7	+10.9
Conservative	W. Burrows	2,326	45.3	−10.9
Majority		487	9.4	
Turnout		5,139		
Labour gain from Conservative		Swing		
