= 1954 Manchester City Council election =

Local election in Manchester, England

- 13 May 1954

43 of 152 seats to Manchester City Council 77 seats needed for a majority
	First party	Second party	Third party
Party	Labour	Conservative	Liberal
Last election	21 seats, 50.9%	15 seats, 47.2%	0 seats, 1.2%
Seats before	74	65	4
Seats won	28	15	0
Seats after	88	60	4
Seat change	▲12	▼5	Steady
Popular vote	120,036	98,835	3,753
Percentage	53.8%	44.3%	1.7%
Swing	▲2.9%	▼2.9%	▲0.5%
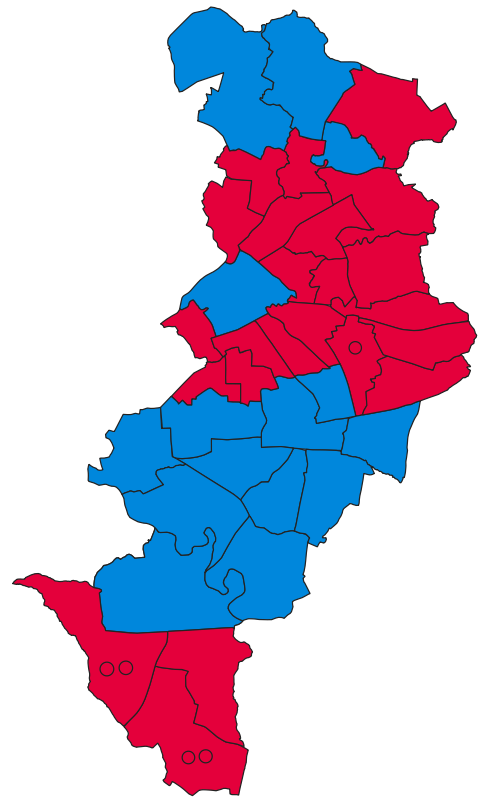
- Map of results of 1954 election
Leader of the Council before election
Labour
Leader of the Council after election
Labour

Elections to Manchester City Council were held on Thursday, 13 May 1954. One third of the councillors seats were up for election, with each successful candidate to serve a three-year term of office. The Wythenshawe ward had been split into three, and two new wards (Baguley and Woodhouse Park) elected all of their councillors for the first time.

The Labour Party retained overall control of the council.

== Election result ==
Party	Votes		Seats			Full Council	
Labour Party	120,036 (53.8%)	▲2.9	28 (65.1%)	28 / 43	▲12	88 (57.9%)	88 / 152
Conservative Party	98,835 (44.3%)	▼2.9	15 (34.9%)	15 / 43	▼5	60 (39.5%)	60 / 152
Liberal Party	3,753 (1.7%)	▲0.5	0 (0.0%)	0 / 43	Steady	4 (2.6%)	4 / 152
Communist	562 (0.3%)	▲0.1	0 (0.0%)	0 / 43	Steady	0 (0.0%)	0 / 152

=== Full council ===
↓
88	4	60

=== Aldermen ===
↓
18	4	16

=== Councillors ===
↓
70	44

== Ward results ==
=== Alexandra Park ===
Alexandra Park
Party	Candidate	Votes	%	±%
Conservative	T. E. Bird*	4,113	74.1	−1.8
Labour	H. Jenkins	1,439	25.9	+1.8
Majority		2,674	48.2	−3.6
Turnout		5,552		
Conservative hold		Swing		

=== All Saints' ===
All Saints'
Party	Candidate	Votes	%	±%
Labour	F. Hatton	2,854	63.0	+1.8
Conservative	C. A. Earley*	1,676	37.0	−1.8
Majority		1,178	26.0	+3.6
Turnout		4,530		
Labour gain from Conservative		Swing		

=== Ardwick ===
Ardwick
Party	Candidate	Votes	%	±%
Labour	F. Taylor	3,569	58.6	−2.3
Conservative	P. Buckley*	2,526	41.4	+2.3
Majority		1,043	17.2	−4.6
Turnout		6,095		
Labour gain from Conservative		Swing		

=== Baguley ===
Baguley (three vacancies)
Party	Candidate	Votes	%	±%
Labour	J. Stuart-Cole	3,267	56.6	
Labour	W. Gallacher	3,242	56.2	
Labour	H. Jenkins	3,172	55.0	
Conservative	H. T. Fairclough	2,559	44.4	
Conservative	N. P. Robinson	2,548	44.2	
Conservative	A. Charlton	2,518	43.6	
Majority		613	10.6	
Turnout		5,769		
Labour win (new seat)				
Labour win (new seat)				
Labour win (new seat)				

=== Barlow Moor ===
Barlow Moor
Party	Candidate	Votes	%	±%
Conservative	H. Harker*	2,386	61.7	−1.6
Labour	E. Mellor	1,479	38.3	+1.6
Majority		907	23.4	−3.2
Turnout		3,868		
Conservative hold		Swing		

=== Benchill ===
Benchill (formerly Wythenshawe)
Party	Candidate	Votes	%	±%
Labour	W. Frost*	3,115	57.2	−6.1
Conservative	A. Williamson	2,206	40.5	+6.7
Communist	G. Taylor	125	2.3	N/A
Majority		909	16.7	−12.8
Turnout		5,446		
Labour hold		Swing		

=== Beswick ===
Beswick
Party	Candidate	Votes	%	±%
Labour	T. W. Farrell*	3,471	78.2	+1.8
Conservative	H. Broderick	969	21.8	−1.8
Majority		2,502	56.4	+3.6
Turnout		4,440		
Labour hold		Swing		

=== Blackley ===
Blackley
Party	Candidate	Votes	%	±%
Conservative	P. Chadwick*	4,142	58.3	+2.1
Labour	W. Lister	2,960	41.7	−2.1
Majority		1,182	16.6	+4.2
Turnout		7,102		
Conservative hold		Swing		

=== Bradford ===
Bradford
Party	Candidate	Votes	%	±%
Labour	E. E. Beavan*	3,917	71.9	+0.3
Conservative	F. H. Robinson	1,530	28.1	−0.3
Majority		2,387	43.8	+0.6
Turnout		5,447		
Labour hold		Swing		

=== Burnage ===
Burnage
Party	Candidate	Votes	%	±%
Conservative	D. J. Edwards*	3,666	56.2	−2.9
Labour	D. Supree	2,855	43.8	+2.9
Majority		811	12.4	−5.8
Turnout		6,521		
Conservative hold		Swing		

=== Cheetham ===
Cheetham
Party	Candidate	Votes	%	±%
Labour	R. B. Prain*	2,102	50.2	+1.3
Liberal	S. Needoff	1,172	28.0	+9.4
Conservative	A. Niman	916	21.8	−10.7
Majority		930	22.2	+5.8
Turnout		4,190		
Labour hold		Swing		

=== Chorlton-cum-Hardy ===
Chorlton-cum-Hardy
Party	Candidate	Votes	%	±%
Conservative	S. Ralphs	3,675	77.3	−2.0
Labour	M. E. Morley	1,079	22.7	+2.0
Majority		2,596	54.6	−4.0
Turnout		4,754		
Conservative hold		Swing		

=== Collegiate Church ===
Collegiate Church
Party	Candidate	Votes	%	±%
Labour	R. Finkel*	2,473	76.2	−1.9
Conservative	R. E. Talbot	630	19.4	+2.7
Communist	M. I. Druck	143	4.4	−0.8
Majority		1,843	56.8	−4.6
Turnout		3,246		
Labour hold		Swing		

=== Crumpsall ===
Crumpsall
Party	Candidate	Votes	%	±%
Conservative	E. Mawdsley*	3,782	53.1	−5.4
Labour	J. P. Jennings	3,336	46.9	+5.4
Majority		446	6.2	−10.8
Turnout		7,118		
Conservative hold		Swing		

=== Didsbury ===
Didsbury
Party	Candidate	Votes	%	±%
Conservative	W. White*	3,150	62.7	−17.2
Liberal	E. Noble	1,146	22.8	N/A
Labour	S. Carter	727	14.5	−5.6
Majority		2,004	39.9	−19.9
Turnout		5,023		
Conservative hold		Swing		

=== Gorton North ===
Gorton North
Party	Candidate	Votes	%	±%
Labour	P. Roddy*	4,139	73.0	+2.7
Conservative	C. N. Clark	1,385	24.4	−2.6
Communist	J. Kay	145	2.6	−0.1
Majority		2,753	48.6	+5.3
Turnout		5,669		
Labour hold		Swing		

=== Gorton South ===
Gorton South
Party	Candidate	Votes	%	±%
Labour	E. Kirkman*	2,578	69.3	+4.7
Conservative	L. J. Naden	1,141	30.7	−4.7
Majority		1,437	38.6	+9.4
Turnout		3,719		
Labour hold		Swing		

=== Harpurhey ===
Harpurhey
Party	Candidate	Votes	%	±%
Labour	A. O'Toole	3,389	51.3	−3.1
Conservative	J. Chatterton*	3,214	48.7	+3.1
Majority		175	2.6	−6.2
Turnout		6,603		
Labour gain from Conservative		Swing		

=== Hugh Oldham ===
Hugh Oldham (formerly Newtown)
Party	Candidate	Votes	%	±%
Labour	S. Humphries	3,162	76.8	−0.2
Conservative	A. Gregory	955	23.2	+0.2
Majority		2,207	53.6	−0.4
Turnout		4,117		
Labour gain from Independent Labour		Swing		

=== Levenshulme ===
Levenshulme
Party	Candidate	Votes	%	±%
Conservative	O. Lodge*	3,134	53.2	+5.2
Labour	H. J. Wimbury	1,908	32.4	−4.2
Liberal	E. Quiligotti	852	14.4	−1.0
Majority		1,226	20.8	+9.4
Turnout		5,894		
Conservative hold		Swing		

=== Lightbowne ===
Lightbowne
Party	Candidate	Votes	%	±%
Conservative	D. Piggott*	3,840	48.4	−7.7
Labour	G. Halstead	3,508	44.2	+0.3
Liberal	F. N. Wedlock	583	7.4	N/A
Majority		332	4.2	−8.0
Turnout		7,931		
Conservative hold		Swing		

=== Longsight ===
Longsight
Party	Candidate	Votes	%	±%
Conservative	F. J. Dunn	2,880	57.4	+2.3
Labour	J. Davis	2,136	42.6	+6.8
Majority		744	14.8	−5.5
Turnout		5,016		
Conservative hold		Swing		

=== Miles Platting ===
Miles Platting
Party	Candidate	Votes	%	±%
Labour	J. H. F. Eccles*	2,449	68.4	−1.9
Conservative	E. Pelham	1,131	31.6	+1.9
Majority		1,318	36.8	−3.8
Turnout		3,580		
Labour hold		Swing		

=== Moss Side East ===
Moss Side East
Party	Candidate	Votes	%	±%
Labour	E. Dell*	2,489	60.3	+11.7
Conservative	M. V. Sparks	1,640	39.7	−1.2
Majority		849	20.6	+12.9
Turnout		4,129		
Labour hold		Swing		

=== Moss Side West ===
Moss Side West
Party	Candidate	Votes	%	±%
Labour	K. Pollitt	2,693	50.6	+0.4
Conservative	A. R. Smith*	2,626	49.4	−0.4
Majority		67	1.2	+0.8
Turnout		5,319		
Labour gain from Conservative		Swing		

=== Moston ===
Moston
Party	Candidate	Votes	%	±%
Labour	R. Latham	4,075	55.3	+2.2
Conservative	M. Dunn*	3,297	44.7	−2.2
Majority		778	10.6	+4.4
Turnout		7,372		
Labour gain from Conservative		Swing		

=== New Cross ===
New Cross
Party	Candidate	Votes	%	±%
Labour	M. Knight*	2,565	74.3	+8.5
Conservative	K. Corless	889	25.7	−8.5
Majority		1,676	48.6	+17.0
Turnout		3,454		
Labour hold		Swing		

=== Newton Heath ===
Newton Heath
Party	Candidate	Votes	%	±%
Labour	W. Binns*	2,936	68.1	+1.3
Conservative	W. H. Priestnall	1,377	31.9	−1.3
Majority		1,559	36.2	+2.6
Turnout		4,313		
Labour hold		Swing		

=== Northenden ===
Northenden
Party	Candidate	Votes	%	±%
Conservative	L. Jacobs*	3,251	50.3	−10.1
Labour	N. Morris	3,208	49.7	+10.1
Majority		43	0.6	−20.2
Turnout		6,459		
Conservative hold		Swing		

=== Old Moat ===
Old Moat
Party	Candidate	Votes	%	±%
Conservative	W. R. Swan*	2,983	63.3	−0.3
Labour	E. V. Hughes	1,731	36.7	+0.3
Majority		1,252	26.6	−0.6
Turnout		4,713		
Conservative hold		Swing		

=== Openshaw ===
Openshaw
Party	Candidate	Votes	%	±%
Labour	S. Jolly*	4,202	72.1	+1.5
Conservative	E. Fitzsimons	1,475	25.3	−4.1
Communist	F. Dean	149	2.6	N/A
Majority		2,727	46.8	+5.6
Turnout		5,826		
Labour hold		Swing		

=== Rusholme ===
Rusholme
Party	Candidate	Votes	%	±%
Conservative	A. T. Barratt*	3,419	70.3	+0.3
Labour	A. H. Green	1,443	29.7	−0.3
Majority		1,976	40.6	+0.6
Turnout		4,862		
Conservative hold		Swing		

=== St. George's ===
St. George's
Party	Candidate	Votes	%	±%
Labour	K. Collis*	3,235	71.3	+6.3
Conservative	J. Livesey	1,300	28.7	−6.3
Majority		1,935	42.6	+12.6
Turnout		4,535		
Labour hold		Swing		

=== St. Luke's ===
St. Luke's
Party	Candidate	Votes	%	±%
Labour	J. Conway*	2,940	53.4	+2.9
Conservative	W. E. A. Yates	2,570	46.6	−2.9
Majority		370	6.8	+5.8
Turnout		5,510		
Labour hold		Swing		

=== St. Mark's ===
St. Mark's (2 vacancies)
Party	Candidate	Votes	%	±%
Labour	B. Conlan	3,905	67.2	−0.2
Labour	L. Drury	3,891	67.0	−0.4
Conservative	E. A. Leggett	1,930	32.6	+0.6
Conservative	W. H. Fleetwood	1,895	32.6	0
Majority		1,961	33.7	−1.1
Turnout		5,811		
Labour hold		Swing		
Labour hold		Swing		

=== St. Peter's ===
St. Peter's
Party	Candidate	Votes	%	±%
Conservative	N. Beer*	1,909	69.8	+6.3
Labour	H. W. Bliss	825	30.2	−6.3
Majority		1,084	39.6	+12.6
Turnout		2,734		
Conservative hold		Swing		

=== Withington ===
Withington
Party	Candidate	Votes	%	±%
Conservative	W. A. Stovell*	3,256	80.9	+0.5
Labour	F. O'Rourke	771	19.1	−0.5
Majority		2,485	61.8	+1.0
Turnout		4,588		
Conservative hold		Swing		

=== Woodhouse Park ===
Woodhouse Park (three vacancies)
Party	Candidate	Votes	%	±%
Labour	C. H. Hall	3,633	72.0	
Labour	H. Waddicor	3,586	71.0	
Labour	W. Smith	3,582	70.9	
Conservative	C. L. Hughes	1,463	29.0	
Conservative	A. E. Hoodith	1,442	28.6	
Conservative	W. McKean	1,441	28.5	
Majority		2,119	41.9	
Turnout		5,049		
Labour win (new seat)				
Labour win (new seat)				
Labour win (new seat)				

== Aldermanic elections ==
=== Aldermanic election, 26 May 1954 ===
Caused by the creation of Baguley and Woodhouse Park wards on 13 May 1954, requiring the election of two aldermen by the council.

The following two were elected as aldermen by the council on 26 May 1954.

Party	Alderman	Ward	Term expires
Labour	Emily Beavan	Woodhouse Park	1955
Labour	William Chadwick	Baguley	1958

=== Aldermanic election, 2 February 1955 ===
Caused by the death on 16 January 1955 of Alderman Sir William Kay (Conservative, elected as an alderman by the council on 3 March 1915).

In his place, Councillor John Sutton (Labour, Gorton South, elected 2 July 1936) was elected as an alderman by the council on 2 February 1955.

Party	Alderman	Ward	Term expires
Labour	John Sutton	Rusholme	1955

== By-elections between 1954 and 1955 ==
=== By-elections, 15 July 1954 ===
Two by-elections were held on 15 July 1954 to fill vacancies that were created by the appointment of aldermen on 26 May 1954.

==== Bradford ====
Caused by the election as an alderman of Councillor Emily Beavan (Labour, Bradford, elected 23 January 1936) on 26 May 1954, following the creation of Woodhouse Park ward on 13 May 1954, requiring the election of an alderman by the council.

Bradford
Party	Candidate	Votes	%	±%
Labour	J. Taylor	3,724	76.9	+5.0
Conservative	F. H. Robinson	1,118	23.1	−5.0
Majority		2,606	53.8	+10.0
Turnout		4,842		
Labour hold		Swing		

==== Miles Platting ====
Caused by the election as an alderman of Councillor William Chadwick (Labour, Miles Platting, elected 1 November 1934) on 26 May 1954, following the creation of Baguley ward on 13 May 1954, requiring the election of an alderman by the council.

Miles Platting
Party	Candidate	Votes	%	±%
Labour	C. R. Morris	1,829	64.2	−4.2
Conservative	E. Pelham	1,021	35.8	+4.2
Majority		808	28.4	−8.4
Turnout		2,850		
Labour hold		Swing		

=== Gorton South, 24 March 1955 ===
Caused by the election as an alderman of Councillor John Sutton (Labour, Gorton South, elected 2 July 1936) on 2 February 1955, following the death on 16 January 1955 of Alderman Sir William Kay (Conservative, elected as an alderman by the council on 3 March 1915).

Gorton South
Party	Candidate	Votes	%	±%
Labour	H. Wimbury	1,993	56.1	−13.2
Conservative	S. Watt	1,560	43.9	+13.2
Majority		433	12.2	−26.4
Turnout		3,553		
Labour hold		Swing		
