= Moss Side East =

- Ward
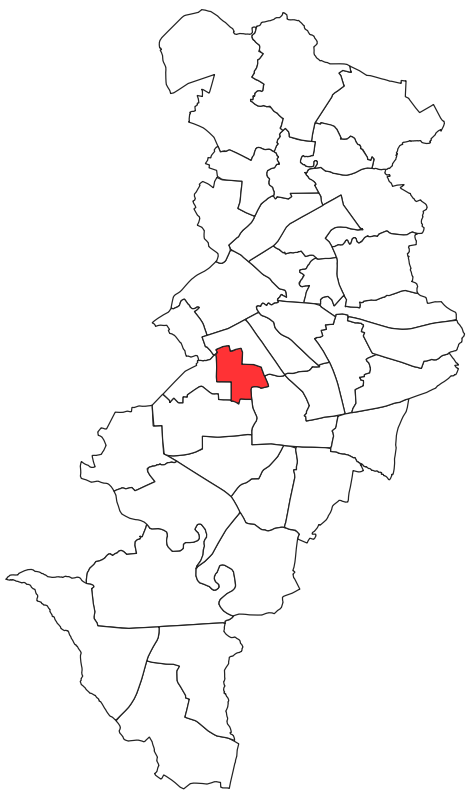
- Moss Side East ward (1954) within Manchester

- Coat of arms
- Country: United Kingdom
- Constituent country: England
- Region: North West England
- County borough: Manchester
- Created: November 1904
- Named for: Moss Side

Government
  - Type: Unicameral
  - Body: Manchester City Council
- UK Parliamentary Constituency: Manchester Moss Side

Moss Side East was an electoral division of Manchester City Council which was represented from 1904 until 1971. It covered Moss Side and a part of Chorlton-on-Medlock.

== Overview ==
Moss Side East ward was created in 1904, as a result of the Manchester Extension Scheme 1904, which transferred the urban districts of Moss Side and Withington to the Manchester corporation. Initially, the ward covered that part of the former Moss Side Urban District to the east of Princess Road. In 1919, the Greenheys area was transferred to the ward from the All Saints' ward while an area to the west of Broadfield Road was transferred from the ward to the Moss Side West ward, these boundaries were largely unaffected by a further boundary revision in 1950. The ward was abolished in 1971, and its remaining area was divided between the new Lloyd Street and Moss Side wards.

From its creation until 1918, the ward formed part of the Manchester South Parliamentary constituency. From 1918 until its abolition, it was part of the Manchester Moss Side Parliamentary constituency.

== Councillors ==
| Election | Councillor | Councillor | Councillor |
|---|---|---|---|
| 1904 | J. Stevenson (Ind) | W. T. Dagnall (Con) | J. Bowie (Lib) |
| 1905 | J. Stevenson (Ind) | W. T. Dagnall (Con) | J. Bowie (Lib) |
| 1906 | J. Stevenson (Ind) | W. T. Dagnall (Con) | J. Bowie (Lib) |
| 1907 | J. Wynne (Lib) | W. T. Dagnall (Con) | J. Bowie (Lib) |
| 1908 | J. Wynne (Lib) | W. T. Dagnall (Con) | J. Bowie (Lib) |
| 1909 | J. Wynne (Lib) | W. T. Dagnall (Con) | J. Bowie (Lib) |
| 1910 | J. Wynne (Lib) | W. T. Dagnall (Con) | J. Bowie (Lib) |
| 1911 | J. Wynne (Lib) | W. T. Dagnall (Con) | J. Bowie (Lib) |
| 1912 | J. Wynne (Lib) | W. T. Dagnall (Con) | J. Bowie (Lib) |
| 1913 | C. Howard (Con) | W. T. Dagnall (Con) | J. Bowie (Lib) |
| 1914 | C. Howard (Con) | W. T. Dagnall (Con) | J. Bowie (Lib) |
| 1919 | C. Howard (Con) | E. Hales (Ind) | J. Bowie (Lib) |
| March 1920 | C. Howard (Con) | E. Hales (Ind) | C. B. Howie (Ind) |
| 1920 | J. C. Brister (Con) | E. Hales (Ind) | C. B. Howie (Ind) |
| 1921 | J. C. Brister (Con) | E. Hales (Ind) | W. Millward (Con) |
| 1922 | J. C. Brister (Con) | E. Hales (Ind) | W. Millward (Con) |
| 1923 | R. E. T. Allen (Lib) | E. Hales (Ind) | W. Millward (Con) |
| 1924 | R. E. T. Allen (Lib) | E. Hales (Ind) | J. B. Zimmern (Lib) |
| 1925 | R. E. T. Allen (Lib) | E. Hales (Ind) | J. B. Zimmern (Lib) |
| 1926 | S. B. Watts (Con) | E. Hales (Ind) | J. B. Zimmern (Lib) |
| 1927 | S. B. Watts (Con) | E. Hales (Ind) | J. B. Zimmern (Lib) |
| November 1927 | W. Barton (Lib) | E. Hales (Ind) | J. B. Zimmern (Lib) |
| 1928 | W. Barton (Lib) | E. Hales (Ind) | J. B. Zimmern (Lib) |
| 1929 | J. N. Wallace (Lab) | E. Hales (Ind) | J. B. Zimmern (Lib) |
| 1930 | J. N. Wallace (Lab) | E. Hales (Ind) | H. A. E. Ramsden (Con) |
| 1931 | J. N. Wallace (Lab) | H. Strange (Con) | H. A. E. Ramsden (Con) |
| 1932 | G. Craven (Con) | H. Strange (Con) | H. A. E. Ramsden (Con) |
| 1933 | G. Craven (Con) | H. Strange (Con) | H. A. E. Ramsden (Con) |
| May 1934 | J. E. Pheasey (Con) | H. Strange (Con) | H. A. E. Ramsden (Con) |
| 1934 | J. E. Pheasey (Con) | H. Strange (Con) | H. A. E. Ramsden (Con) |
| 1935 | J. E. Pheasey (Con) | H. Strange (Con) | H. A. E. Ramsden (Con) |
| 1936 | J. E. Pheasey (Con) | H. Strange (Con) | H. A. E. Ramsden (Con) |
| 1937 | J. E. Pheasey (Con) | A. R. Edwards (Res) | H. A. E. Ramsden (Con) |
| 1938 | J. E. Pheasey (Con) | A. R. Edwards (Res) | H. A. E. Ramsden (Con) |
| 1945 | J. E. Pheasey (Con) | A. R. Edwards (Res) | T. Knowles (Lab) |
| 1946 | J. E. Pheasey (Con) | W. A. Downward (Lab) | T. Knowles (Lab) |
| March 1947 | J. E. Pheasey (Con) | W. A. Downward (Lab) | H. A. E. Ramsden (Con) |
| 1947 | J. E. Pheasey (Con) | W. A. Downward (Lab) | H. A. E. Ramsden (Con) |
| 1949 | J. E. Pheasey (Con) | W. A. Downward (Lab) | C. Cuffin (Con) |
| 1950 | J. E. Pheasey (Con) | G. J. Playford (Con) | C. Cuffin (Con) |
| 1951 | J. E. Pheasey (Con) | G. J. Playford (Con) | C. Cuffin (Con) |
| 1952 | J. E. Pheasey (Con) | G. J. Playford (Con) | W. A. Downward (Lab) |
| 1953 | J. E. Pheasey (Con) | P. V. Wood (Lab) | W. A. Downward (Lab) |
| July 1953 | E. Dell (Lab) | P. V. Wood (Lab) | W. A. Downward (Lab) |
| 1954 | E. Dell (Lab) | P. V. Wood (Lab) | W. A. Downward (Lab) |
| 1955 | E. Dell (Lab) | P. V. Wood (Lab) | W. R. Swan (Con) |
| 1956 | E. Dell (Lab) | W. A. Downward (Lab) | W. R. Swan (Con) |
| 1957 | E. Dell (Lab) | W. A. Downward (Lab) | W. R. Swan (Con) |
| 1958 | E. Dell (Lab) | W. A. Downward (Lab) | C. E. Bedgood (Lab) |
| 1959 | E. Dell (Lab) | W. A. Downward (Lab) | C. E. Bedgood (Lab) |
| 1960 | J. Lang (Con) | W. A. Downward (Lab) | C. E. Bedgood (Lab) |
| 1961 | J. Lang (Con) | W. A. Downward (Lab) | P. Whitby (Con) |
| 1962 | J. Lang (Con) | W. A. Downward (Lab) | P. Whitby (Con) |
| 1963 | A. J. Bateman (Lab) | W. A. Downward (Lab) | P. Whitby (Con) |
| 1964 | A. J. Bateman (Lab) | W. A. Downward (Lab) | H. P. D. Paget (Lab) |
| 1965 | A. J. Bateman (Lab) | W. A. Downward (Lab) | H. P. D. Paget (Lab) |
| 1966 | A. J. Bateman (Lab) | W. A. Downward (Lab) | H. P. D. Paget (Lab) |
| 1967 | A. J. Bateman (Lab) | W. A. Downward (Lab) | S. Mottram (Con) |
| 1968 | A. J. Bateman (Lab) | J. F. Ridley (Con) | S. Mottram (Con) |
| 1969 | P. M. Nixon (Con) | J. F. Ridley (Con) | S. Mottram (Con) |
| 1970 | P. M. Nixon (Con) | J. F. Ridley (Con) | H. P. D. Paget (Lab) |

== Elections ==
=== Elections in 1900s ===
==== November 1904 ====
1904 (3 vacancies)
| Party | Candidate | Votes | % | ±% |
|---|---|---|---|---|
| Independent | J. Stevenson | 811 | 64.1 | |
| Conservative | W. T. Dagnall | 634 | 50.1 | |
| Liberal | J. Bowie | 590 | 46.6 | |
| Liberal | J. Wynne | 584 | 46.1 | |
| Conservative | A. Gresty | 573 | 45.3 | |
| Majority | | 6 | 0.5 | |
| Turnout | | 1,266 | | |
| Independent win (new seat) | | | | |
| Conservative win (new seat) | | | | |
| Liberal win (new seat) | | | | |

==== November 1905 ====
1905
| Party | Candidate | Votes | % | ±% |
|---|---|---|---|---|
| Liberal | J. Bowie* | uncontested | | |
| Liberal hold | | Swing | | |

==== November 1906 ====
1906
| Party | Candidate | Votes | % | ±% |
|---|---|---|---|---|
| Conservative | W. T. Dagnall* | 1,057 | 62.3 | N/A |
| Liberal | C. Green | 639 | 37.7 | N/A |
| Majority | | 418 | 24.6 | N/A |
| Turnout | | 1,696 | | |
| Conservative hold | | Swing | | |

==== November 1907 ====
1907
| Party | Candidate | Votes | % | ±% |
|---|---|---|---|---|
| Liberal | J. Wynne | 904 | 53.4 | +15.7 |
| Independent | C. Green | 788 | 46.6 | N/A |
| Majority | | 116 | 6.8 | |
| Turnout | | 1,692 | | |
| Liberal gain from Independent | | Swing | | |

==== November 1908 ====
1908
| Party | Candidate | Votes | % | ±% |
|---|---|---|---|---|
| Liberal | J. Bowie* | 1,025 | 54.8 | +1.4 |
| Conservative | W. E. Harvey | 845 | 45.2 | N/A |
| Majority | | 180 | 9.6 | +2.8 |
| Turnout | | 1,870 | | |
| Liberal hold | | Swing | | |

==== November 1909 ====
1909
| Party | Candidate | Votes | % | ±% |
|---|---|---|---|---|
| Conservative | W. T. Dagnall* | 947 | 51.6 | +6.4 |
| Liberal | F. Thomas | 889 | 48.4 | −6.4 |
| Majority | | 58 | 3.2 | |
| Turnout | | 1,836 | | |
| Conservative hold | | Swing | | |

=== Elections in 1910s ===
==== November 1910 ====
1910
| Party | Candidate | Votes | % | ±% |
|---|---|---|---|---|
| Liberal | J. Wynne* | 932 | 54.6 | +6.2 |
| Independent | W. Stanway | 774 | 45.4 | N/A |
| Majority | | 158 | 9.2 | |
| Turnout | | 1,706 | | |
| Liberal hold | | Swing | | |

==== November 1911 ====
1911
| Party | Candidate | Votes | % | ±% |
|---|---|---|---|---|
| Liberal | J. Bowie* | 921 | 52.4 | −2.2 |
| Conservative | A. W. Hildreth | 838 | 47.6 | N/A |
| Majority | | 83 | 4.8 | −4.4 |
| Turnout | | 1,759 | | |
| Liberal hold | | Swing | | |

==== November 1912 ====
1912
| Party | Candidate | Votes | % | ±% |
|---|---|---|---|---|
| Conservative | W. T. Dagnall* | 910 | 51.1 | +3.5 |
| English League for the Taxation of Land Values | A. H. Weller | 870 | 48.9 | N/A |
| Majority | | 40 | 2.2 | |
| Turnout | | 1,780 | | |
| Conservative hold | | Swing | | |

==== November 1913 ====
1913
| Party | Candidate | Votes | % | ±% |
|---|---|---|---|---|
| Conservative | C. Howard | 1,101 | 51.9 | +0.8 |
| Liberal | J. Wynne* | 1,021 | 48.1 | N/A |
| Majority | | 80 | 3.8 | +1.6 |
| Turnout | | 2,122 | | |
| Conservative gain from Liberal | | Swing | | |

==== November 1914 ====
1914
| Party | Candidate | Votes | % | ±% |
|---|---|---|---|---|
| Liberal | J. Bowie* | uncontested | | |
| Liberal hold | | Swing | | |

==== November 1919 ====
1919 (new boundaries)
| Party | Candidate | Votes | % | ±% |
|---|---|---|---|---|
| Independent | E. Hales | 1,953 | 68.6 | |
| Conservative | F. W. W. Breakell* | 895 | 31.4 | |
| Majority | | 1,058 | 37.2 | |
| Turnout | | 2,848 | 37.5 | |
| Independent gain from Conservative | | Swing | | |

=== Elections in 1920s ===
==== March 1920 (by-election) ====
By-election: 30 March 1920
| Party | Candidate | Votes | % | ±% |
|---|---|---|---|---|
| Independent | C. B. Howie | 1,201 | 62.7 | −5.9 |
| Conservative | J. C. Brister | 713 | 37.3 | +5.9 |
| Majority | | 488 | 25.4 | −11.8 |
| Turnout | | 1,914 | 25.2 | −12.3 |
| Independent gain from Liberal | | Swing | | |

==== November 1920 ====
1920
| Party | Candidate | Votes | % | ±% |
|---|---|---|---|---|
| Conservative | J. C. Brister | 1,468 | 44.3 | +12.9 |
| Labour | E. J. Hookway | 1,349 | 40.7 | N/A |
| Liberal | E. Barker | 499 | 15.0 | N/A |
| Majority | | 119 | 3.6 | |
| Turnout | | 3,316 | 32.6 | −4.9 |
| Conservative hold | | Swing | | |

==== November 1921 ====
1921
| Party | Candidate | Votes | % | ±% |
|---|---|---|---|---|
| Conservative | W. Millward | 2,008 | 51.0 | +6.7 |
| Independent | D. S. Bloomfield | 1,813 | 46.0 | N/A |
| Independent | A. R. Edwards | 120 | 3.0 | N/A |
| Majority | | 195 | 5.0 | +1.4 |
| Turnout | | 3,941 | 51.5 | +18.9 |
| Conservative gain from Independent | | Swing | | |

==== November 1922 ====
1922
| Party | Candidate | Votes | % | ±% |
|---|---|---|---|---|
| Independent | E. Hales* | 2,437 | 58.8 | N/A |
| Conservative | R. S. Banks | 1,711 | 41.2 | −9.8 |
| Majority | | 728 | 17.6 | |
| Turnout | | 4,148 | 53.3 | +1.8 |
| Independent hold | | Swing | | |

==== November 1923 ====
1923
| Party | Candidate | Votes | % | ±% |
|---|---|---|---|---|
| Liberal | R. E. T. Allen | 1,821 | 46.5 | N/A |
| Conservative | H. Dale | 1,219 | 31.1 | −10.1 |
| Labour | G. H. Harris | 877 | 22.4 | N/A |
| Majority | | 602 | 15.4 | |
| Turnout | | 3,917 | | |
| Liberal gain from Conservative | | Swing | | |

==== November 1924 ====
1924
| Party | Candidate | Votes | % | ±% |
|---|---|---|---|---|
| Liberal | J. B. Zimmern | 1,791 | 50.7 | +4.2 |
| Conservative | J. C. Brister | 1,647 | 46.6 | +15.5 |
| Independent | A. R. Edwards | 94 | 2.7 | N/A |
| Majority | | 144 | 4.1 | −11.3 |
| Turnout | | 3,532 | | |
| Liberal gain from Conservative | | Swing | | |

==== November 1925 ====
1925
| Party | Candidate | Votes | % | ±% |
|---|---|---|---|---|
| Independent | E. Hales* | 2,032 | 49.0 | N/A |
| Conservative | R. McDowell | 2,009 | 48.5 | +1.9 |
| Residents | A. R. Edwards | 87 | 2.1 | −0.6 |
| Residents | A. M. Edwards | 17 | 0.4 | −2.3 |
| Majority | | 23 | 0.5 | |
| Turnout | | 4,145 | 50.9 | |
| Independent hold | | Swing | | |

==== November 1926 ====
1926
| Party | Candidate | Votes | % | ±% |
|---|---|---|---|---|
| Conservative | S. B. Watts | 1,551 | 46.7 | −1.8 |
| Liberal | H. Entwistle | 1,521 | 45.8 | N/A |
| Prohibitionist | J. Rochford | 160 | 4.8 | N/A |
| Residents | A. R. Edwards | 86 | 2.6 | +0.5 |
| Majority | | 30 | 0.9 | |
| Turnout | | 3,318 | 40.8 | −10.1 |
| Conservative gain from Liberal | | Swing | | |

==== November 1927 ====
1927
| Party | Candidate | Votes | % | ±% |
|---|---|---|---|---|
| Liberal | J. B. Zimmern* | 2,203 | 59.3 | +13.5 |
| Conservative | H. Coe | 1,402 | 37.7 | −9.0 |
| Residents | A. R. Edwards | 113 | 3.0 | +0.4 |
| Majority | | 801 | 21.5 | |
| Turnout | | 3,718 | 46.4 | +5.6 |
| Liberal hold | | Swing | | |

==== November 1927 (by-election) ====
By-election: 29 November 1927
| Party | Candidate | Votes | % | ±% |
|---|---|---|---|---|
| Liberal | W. Barton | 1,486 | 37.9 | −21.4 |
| Conservative | A. E. B. Alexander | 1,273 | 32.5 | −5.2 |
| Labour Co-op | T. Anderson | 1,132 | 28.9 | N/A |
| Residents | A. R. Edwards | 31 | 0.8 | −2.2 |
| Majority | | 213 | 5.4 | −16.1 |
| Turnout | | 3,922 | 49.0 | +2.6 |
| Liberal gain from Conservative | | Swing | | |

==== November 1928 ====
1928
| Party | Candidate | Votes | % | ±% |
|---|---|---|---|---|
| Independent | E. Hales* | 1,815 | 47.8 | N/A |
| Conservative | R. Ridyard | 1,373 | 36.2 | −1.5 |
| Labour | J. Owen | 571 | 15.0 | N/A |
| Residents | A. R. Edwards | 36 | 0.9 | −2.1 |
| Majority | | 442 | 11.6 | |
| Turnout | | 3,795 | 48.6 | +2.2 |
| Independent hold | | Swing | | |

==== November 1929 ====
1929
| Party | Candidate | Votes | % | ±% |
|---|---|---|---|---|
| Labour | J. N. Wallace | 955 | 36.0 | +21.0 |
| Conservative | A. H. Townend | 950 | 35.8 | −0.4 |
| Liberal | R. Caradoc Roberts | 731 | 27.6 | N/A |
| Residents | A. R. Edwards | 17 | 0.6 | −0.3 |
| Majority | | 5 | 0.2 | |
| Turnout | | 2,653 | 31.3 | −17.3 |
| Labour gain from Liberal | | Swing | | |

=== Elections in 1930s ===
==== November 1930 ====
1930
| Party | Candidate | Votes | % | ±% |
|---|---|---|---|---|
| Conservative | H. A. E. Ramsden | 1,825 | 52.3 | +16.5 |
| Liberal | C. Gandy | 1,068 | 30.6 | +3.0 |
| Labour | T. J. Feigherey | 584 | 16.7 | −19.3 |
| Residents | A. M. Edwards | 14 | 0.4 | −0.2 |
| Majority | | 757 | 21.7 | |
| Turnout | | 3,491 | | |
| Conservative gain from Liberal | | Swing | | |

==== November 1931 ====
1931
| Party | Candidate | Votes | % | ±% |
|---|---|---|---|---|
| Conservative | H. Strange | 2,734 | 92.6 | +40.3 |
| Residents | A. R. Edwards | 218 | 7.4 | +7.0 |
| Majority | | 2,516 | 85.2 | +63.5 |
| Turnout | | 2,952 | 33.9 | |
| Conservative gain from Independent | | Swing | | |

==== November 1932 ====
1932
| Party | Candidate | Votes | % | ±% |
|---|---|---|---|---|
| Conservative | G. Craven | 1,500 | 54.8 | −37.8 |
| Labour | A. O'Donnell | 1,130 | 41.3 | N/A |
| Residents | A. R. Edwards | 109 | 4.0 | −3.4 |
| Majority | | 370 | 13.5 | −71.7 |
| Turnout | | 2,739 | | |
| Conservative gain from Labour | | Swing | | |

==== November 1933 ====
1933
| Party | Candidate | Votes | % | ±% |
|---|---|---|---|---|
| Conservative | H. A. E. Ramsden* | 1,300 | 50.4 | −4.4 |
| Labour | A. O'Donnell | 1,186 | 46.0 | +4.7 |
| Residents | A. R. Edwards | 93 | 3.6 | −0.4 |
| Majority | | 114 | 4.4 | −9.1 |
| Turnout | | 2,579 | | |
| Conservative hold | | Swing | | |

==== May 1934 (by-election) ====
By-election: 15 May 1934
| Party | Candidate | Votes | % | ±% |
|---|---|---|---|---|
| Conservative | J. E. Pheasey | 882 | 53.2 | +2.8 |
| Labour | A. O'Donnell | 723 | 43.6 | −2.4 |
| Residents | A. R. Edwards | 53 | 3.2 | −0.4 |
| Majority | | 159 | 9.6 | +5.2 |
| Turnout | | 1,658 | | |
| Conservative hold | | Swing | | |

==== November 1934 ====
1934
| Party | Candidate | Votes | % | ±% |
|---|---|---|---|---|
| Conservative | H. Strange* | 1,227 | 45.6 | −4.8 |
| Labour | A. O'Donnell | 1,161 | 43.2 | −2.8 |
| Residents | A. R. Edwards | 300 | 11.2 | +7.6 |
| Majority | | 66 | 2.4 | −2.0 |
| Turnout | | 2,688 | | |
| Conservative hold | | Swing | | |

==== November 1935 ====
1935
| Party | Candidate | Votes | % | ±% |
|---|---|---|---|---|
| Conservative | J. E. Pheasey* | 1,442 | 49.9 | +4.3 |
| Labour | W. Gallacher | 979 | 33.9 | −9.3 |
| Residents | A. R. Edwards | 472 | 16.2 | +5.0 |
| Majority | | 463 | 16.0 | +13.6 |
| Turnout | | 2,892 | | |
| Conservative hold | | Swing | | |

==== November 1936 ====
1936
| Party | Candidate | Votes | % | ±% |
|---|---|---|---|---|
| Conservative | H. A. E. Ramsden* | 1,265 | 40.0 | −9.9 |
| Labour | W. Griffiths | 986 | 31.2 | −2.7 |
| Residents | A. R. Edwards | 914 | 28.8 | +12.6 |
| Majority | | 279 | 8.8 | −7.2 |
| Turnout | | 3,165 | | |
| Conservative hold | | Swing | | |

==== November 1937 ====
1937
| Party | Candidate | Votes | % | ±% |
|---|---|---|---|---|
| Residents | A. R. Edwards | 1,248 | 36.0 | +7.2 |
| Conservative | H. Strange* | 1,165 | 33.6 | −6.4 |
| Labour | W. Griffiths | 1,057 | 30.4 | −0.8 |
| Majority | | 83 | 2.4 | |
| Turnout | | 3,470 | | |
| Residents gain from Conservative | | Swing | | |

==== November 1938 ====
1938
| Party | Candidate | Votes | % | ±% |
|---|---|---|---|---|
| Conservative | J. E. Pheasey* | 1,240 | 37.7 | +4.1 |
| Labour | W. Griffiths | 1,164 | 35.4 | +5.0 |
| Residents | A. M. Edwards | 884 | 26.9 | −9.1 |
| Majority | | 76 | 2.3 | |
| Turnout | | 3,288 | | |
| Conservative hold | | Swing | | |

=== Elections in 1940s ===
==== November 1945 ====
1945
| Party | Candidate | Votes | % | ±% |
|---|---|---|---|---|
| Labour | T. Knowles | 1,914 | 51.4 | +16.0 |
| Conservative | H. A. E. Ramsden* | 1,389 | 37.3 | −0.4 |
| Residents | A. M. Edwards | 423 | 11.3 | −15.6 |
| Majority | | 525 | 14.1 | |
| Turnout | | 3,726 | 31.7 | |
| Labour gain from Conservative | | Swing | | |

==== November 1946 ====
1946
| Party | Candidate | Votes | % | ±% |
|---|---|---|---|---|
| Labour | W. A. Downward | 1,757 | 39.5 | −11.9 |
| Conservative | H. A. E. Ramsden | 1,569 | 35.3 | −2.0 |
| Residents | A. R. Edwards* | 1,124 | 25.4 | +14.1 |
| Majority | | 188 | 4.2 | −9.9 |
| Turnout | | 4,450 | | |
| Labour gain from Residents | | Swing | | |

==== March 1947 (by-election) ====
By-election: 13 March 1947
| Party | Candidate | Votes | % | ±% |
|---|---|---|---|---|
| Conservative | H. A. E. Ramsden | 1,654 | 51.2 | +15.9 |
| Labour | J. W. Upton | 1,059 | 32.8 | −6.7 |
| Residents | A. R. Edwards | 376 | 11.6 | −13.8 |
| Liberal | J. E. Moore | 139 | 4.4 | N/A |
| Majority | | 595 | 18.4 | |
| Turnout | | 4,450 | | |
| Conservative gain from Labour | | Swing | | |

==== November 1947 ====
1947
| Party | Candidate | Votes | % | ±% |
|---|---|---|---|---|
| Conservative | J. E. Pheasey* | 3,249 | 53.3 | +18.0 |
| Labour | A. McAdam | 2,476 | 40.6 | +1.1 |
| Liberal | R. Frere | 369 | 6.1 | N/A |
| Majority | | 773 | 12.7 | |
| Turnout | | 6,094 | | |
| Conservative hold | | Swing | | |

==== May 1949 ====
1949
| Party | Candidate | Votes | % | ±% |
|---|---|---|---|---|
| Conservative | C. Cuffin | 2,857 | 53.0 | −0.3 |
| Labour | A. McAdam | 2,421 | 44.9 | +4.3 |
| Communist | L. Johnson | 108 | 2.1 | N/A |
| Majority | | 436 | 8.1 | −4.6 |
| Turnout | | 5,386 | | |
| Conservative hold | | Swing | | |

=== Elections in 1950s ===
==== May 1950 ====
1950 (new boundaries)
| Party | Candidate | Votes | % | ±% |
|---|---|---|---|---|
| Conservative | G. J. Playford | 2,724 | 53.2 | |
| Labour | D. Molloy | 2,273 | 44.4 | |
| Communist | L. B. Johnson | 125 | 2.4 | |
| Majority | | 451 | 8.8 | |
| Turnout | | 5,122 | | |
| Conservative gain from Labour | | Swing | | |

==== May 1951 ====
1951
| Party | Candidate | Votes | % | ±% |
|---|---|---|---|---|
| Conservative | J. E. Pheasey* | 3,086 | 63.5 | +10.3 |
| Labour | W. A. Downward | 1,775 | 36.5 | −7.9 |
| Majority | | 1,311 | 27.0 | +18.2 |
| Turnout | | 4,861 | | |
| Conservative hold | | Swing | | |

==== May 1952 ====
1952
| Party | Candidate | Votes | % | ±% |
|---|---|---|---|---|
| Labour | W. A. Downward | 3,597 | 59.0 | +22.5 |
| Conservative | C. Cuffin* | 2,498 | 41.0 | −22.5 |
| Majority | | 1,099 | 18.0 | |
| Turnout | | 6,095 | | |
| Labour gain from Conservative | | Swing | | |

==== May 1953 ====
1953
| Party | Candidate | Votes | % | ±% |
|---|---|---|---|---|
| Labour | P. V. Wood | 2,661 | 48.6 | −10.4 |
| Conservative | G. J. Playford* | 2,235 | 40.9 | −0.1 |
| Independent | C. Cuffin | 575 | 10.5 | N/A |
| Majority | | 426 | 7.7 | −10.3 |
| Turnout | | 5,471 | | |
| Labour gain from Conservative | | Swing | | |

==== July 1953 (by-election) ====
By-election: 2 July 1953
| Party | Candidate | Votes | % | ±% |
|---|---|---|---|---|
| Labour | E. Dell | 2,629 | 51.5 | +2.9 |
| Conservative | G. J. Playford | 2,107 | 41.3 | +0.4 |
| Independent | C. Cuffin | 424 | 8.2 | −2.3 |
| Majority | | 522 | 10.2 | +2.5 |
| Turnout | | 5,160 | | |
| Labour gain from Conservative | | Swing | | |

==== May 1954 ====
1954
| Party | Candidate | Votes | % | ±% |
|---|---|---|---|---|
| Labour | E. Dell* | 2,489 | 60.3 | +11.7 |
| Conservative | M. V. Sparks | 1,640 | 39.7 | −1.2 |
| Majority | | 849 | 20.6 | +12.9 |
| Turnout | | 4,129 | | |
| Labour hold | | Swing | | |

==== May 1955 ====
1955
| Party | Candidate | Votes | % | ±% |
|---|---|---|---|---|
| Conservative | W. R. Swan* | 2,604 | 52.8 | +13.1 |
| Labour | W. A. Downward* | 2,222 | 45.1 | −15.1 |
| Communist | L. B. Johnson | 106 | 2.1 | N/A |
| Majority | | 382 | 7.7 | |
| Turnout | | 4,932 | | |
| Conservative gain from Labour | | Swing | | |

==== May 1956 ====
1956
| Party | Candidate | Votes | % | ±% |
|---|---|---|---|---|
| Labour | W. A. Downward | 2,538 | 55.7 | +10.6 |
| Conservative | L. V. Roy | 1,927 | 42.3 | −10.5 |
| Communist | L. B. Johnson | 92 | 2.0 | −0.1 |
| Majority | | 611 | 13.4 | |
| Turnout | | 4,557 | | |
| Labour hold | | Swing | | |

==== May 1957 ====
1957
| Party | Candidate | Votes | % | ±% |
|---|---|---|---|---|
| Labour | E. Dell* | 2,266 | 61.6 | +5.9 |
| Conservative | H. Boff | 1,415 | 38.4 | −3.9 |
| Majority | | 851 | 23.2 | +9.8 |
| Turnout | | 3,681 | | |
| Labour hold | | Swing | | |

==== May 1958 ====
1958
| Party | Candidate | Votes | % | ±% |
|---|---|---|---|---|
| Labour | C. E. Bedgood | 2,022 | 59.7 | −1.9 |
| Conservative | H. Boff | 1,240 | 36.6 | −1.8 |
| Communist | T. Wright | 127 | 3.7 | N/A |
| Majority | | 782 | 23.1 | −0.1 |
| Turnout | | 3,389 | | |
| Labour gain from Conservative | | Swing | | |

==== May 1959 ====
1959
| Party | Candidate | Votes | % | ±% |
|---|---|---|---|---|
| Labour | W. A. Downward* | 2,080 | 53.4 | −6.3 |
| Conservative | J. Lang | 1,681 | 43.1 | +6.5 |
| Communist | T. Wright | 136 | 3.5 | −0.2 |
| Majority | | 399 | 10.2 | −12.9 |
| Turnout | | 3,897 | | |
| Labour hold | | Swing | | |

=== Elections in 1960s ===
==== May 1960 ====
1960
| Party | Candidate | Votes | % | ±% |
|---|---|---|---|---|
| Conservative | J. Lang | 1,343 | 39.2 | −3.9 |
| Labour | E. Dell* | 1,290 | 37.7 | −15.7 |
| Ratepayers | J. E. Pheasey | 724 | 21.1 | N/A |
| Communist | T. J. Wright | 66 | 1.9 | −1.6 |
| Majority | | 53 | 1.5 | |
| Turnout | | 3,423 | | |
| Conservative gain from Labour | | Swing | | |

==== May 1961 ====
1961
| Party | Candidate | Votes | % | ±% |
|---|---|---|---|---|
| Conservative | P. Whitby | 1,799 | 55.0 | +15.8 |
| Labour | E. C. Bedgood* | 1,470 | 45.0 | +7.3 |
| Majority | | 329 | 10.0 | +8.5 |
| Turnout | | 3,269 | | |
| Conservative gain from Labour | | Swing | | |

==== May 1962 ====
1962
| Party | Candidate | Votes | % | ±% |
|---|---|---|---|---|
| Labour | W. A. Downward* | 1,763 | 47.0 | +2.0 |
| Conservative | A. H. Burlin | 1,600 | 42.7 | −12.3 |
| Ratepayers | G. J. Playford | 208 | 5.5 | N/A |
| Union Movement | M. E. Hesketh | 119 | 3.2 | N/A |
| Communist | L. B. Johnson | 60 | 1.6 | N/A |
| Majority | | 163 | 4.3 | −5.7 |
| Turnout | | 3,750 | | |
| Labour hold | | Swing | | |

==== May 1963 ====
1963
| Party | Candidate | Votes | % | ±% |
|---|---|---|---|---|
| Labour | A. J. Bateman | 1,889 | 51.7 | +4.7 |
| Conservative | J. Lang* | 1,391 | 38.1 | −4.6 |
| Liberal | J. B. Delafallie | 371 | 10.2 | N/A |
| Majority | | 498 | 13.6 | +9.3 |
| Turnout | | 3,651 | | |
| Labour gain from Conservative | | Swing | | |

==== May 1964 ====
1964
| Party | Candidate | Votes | % | ±% |
|---|---|---|---|---|
| Labour | H. P. D. Paget | 1,740 | 53.1 | +1.4 |
| Conservative | P. Whitby* | 1,298 | 39.5 | +1.5 |
| Liberal | M. A. G. Hatton | 243 | 7.4 | −2.8 |
| Majority | | 442 | 13.1 | −0.1 |
| Turnout | | 3,281 | | |
| Labour gain from Conservative | | Swing | | |

==== May 1965 ====
1965
| Party | Candidate | Votes | % | ±% |
|---|---|---|---|---|
| Labour | W. A. Downward* | 1,458 | 47.5 | −5.6 |
| Conservative | S. Mottram | 1,419 | 46.2 | +6.7 |
| Liberal | M. A. G. Hatton | 194 | 6.3 | −1.1 |
| Majority | | 39 | 1.3 | −11.8 |
| Turnout | | 3,071 | | |
| Labour hold | | Swing | | |

==== May 1966 ====
1966
| Party | Candidate | Votes | % | ±% |
|---|---|---|---|---|
| Labour | A. J. Bateman* | 1,275 | 55.2 | +7.7 |
| Conservative | S. Mottram | 1,036 | 44.8 | −1.4 |
| Majority | | 239 | 10.4 | +9.1 |
| Turnout | | 2,311 | | |
| Labour hold | | Swing | | |

==== May 1967 ====
1967
| Party | Candidate | Votes | % | ±% |
|---|---|---|---|---|
| Conservative | S. Mottram | 1,353 | 59.6 | +14.8 |
| Labour | H. P. D. Paget* | 919 | 40.4 | −14.8 |
| Majority | | 434 | 19.2 | |
| Turnout | | 2,272 | | |
| Conservative gain from Labour | | Swing | | |

==== May 1968 ====
1968
| Party | Candidate | Votes | % | ±% |
|---|---|---|---|---|
| Conservative | J. F. Ridley | 1,382 | 55.8 | −3.8 |
| Labour | W. A. Downward* | 938 | 37.9 | −2.5 |
| Liberal | M. Howard | 157 | 6.3 | N/A |
| Majority | | 444 | 17.9 | −1.3 |
| Turnout | | 2,477 | | |
| Conservative gain from Labour | | Swing | | |

==== May 1969 ====
1969
| Party | Candidate | Votes | % | ±% |
|---|---|---|---|---|
| Conservative | P. M. Nixon | 1,457 | 59.7 | +3.9 |
| Labour | A. J. Bateman* | 985 | 40.3 | +2.4 |
| Majority | | 472 | 19.4 | +1.5 |
| Turnout | | 2,442 | | |
| Conservative gain from Labour | | Swing | | |

=== Elections in 1970s ===
==== May 1970 ====
1970
| Party | Candidate | Votes | % | ±% |
|---|---|---|---|---|
| Labour | H. P. D. Paget | 1,587 | 55.9 | +15.6 |
| Conservative | S. Mottram* | 1,221 | 43.0 | −16.7 |
| Residents | C. N. Henry | 33 | 1.1 | N/A |
| Majority | | 366 | 12.9 | |
| Turnout | | 2,841 | | |
| Labour gain from Conservative | | Swing | | |

== See also ==
- Manchester City Council
- Manchester City Council elections
