= Miles Platting (ward) =

- Ward
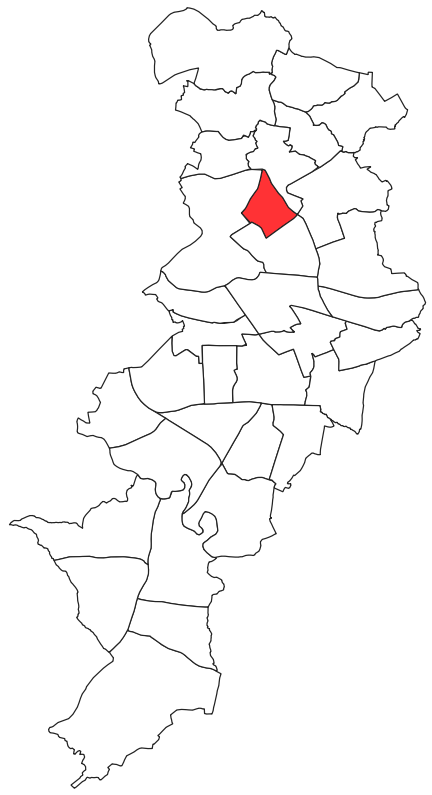
- Miles Platting ward (1973) within Manchester

- Coat of arms
- Country: United Kingdom
- Constituent country: England
- Region: North West England
- County: Greater Manchester
- Metropolitan borough: Manchester
- Created: November 1890
- Named for: Miles Platting

Government
  - Type: Unicameral
  - Body: Manchester City Council
- UK Parliamentary Constituency: Manchester Central

Miles Platting was an electoral division of Manchester City Council which was represented from 1890 until 1982. It covered the Miles Platting area of North Manchester.

== Overview ==
Miles Platting ward was created in 1890, as a result of the Manchester Extension Scheme 1890, which transferred the townships of Blackley, Crumpsall, Moston, Newton, Openshaw, and parts of Gorton to the Manchester corporation. Initially, it covered the western portion of the former Newton township. City-wide boundary revisions in 1919 transferred that part of the ward to the north of Oldham Road to the new Collyhurst ward, before a further boundary revision in 1950 extended the ward's eastern boundary to Ten Acres Lane. Another revision in 1971 transferred part of the former Hugh Oldham ward to the east of Rochdale Road to the ward. The ward was abolished in 1982, and its remaining area was transferred to the new Central ward.

From its creation until 1918, the ward was split between the Manchester North and Manchester North East Parliamentary constituencies. From 1918 until 1950, it was part of the Manchester Platting Parliamentary constituency. From 1950 until 1955 it was part of the Manchester Clayton Parliamentary constituency. From 1955 until 1974, it was part of the Manchester Cheetham Parliamentary constituency. From 1974 until its abolition, it was part of the Manchester Central Parliamentary constituency.

== Councillors ==
Election	Councillor	Councillor	Councillor
1890	H. Morgan (Con)	J. Bowes (Lib)	H. Tetlow (Con)
1891	H. Morgan (Con)	J. Bowes (Lib)	H. Tetlow (Con)
1892	H. Morgan (Con)	J. Bowes (Lib)	H. Tetlow (Con)
1893	H. Morgan (Con)	J. Bowes (Lib)	H. Tetlow (Con)
1894	H. Morgan (Con)	J. Bowes (Lib)	S. Dixon (Con)
1895	H. Morgan (Con)	J. Bowes (Lib)	S. Dixon (Con)
1896	T. Milnes (Con)	J. Bowes (Lib)	S. Dixon (Con)
1897	T. Milnes (Con)	J. Bowes (Lib)	S. Dixon (Con)
1898	T. Milnes (Con)	J. Bowes (Lib)	S. Dixon (Con)
1899	T. Milnes (Con)	J. Bowes (Lib)	S. Dixon (Con)
1900	T. Milnes (Con)	J. Bowes (Lib)	S. Dixon (Con)
1901	T. Milnes (Con)	J. Bowes (Lib)	S. Dixon (Con)
1902	H. Heenan (Con)	J. Bowes (Lib)	S. Dixon (Con)
1903	H. Heenan (Con)	J. Bowes (Lib)	S. Dixon (Con)
November 1903	H. Heenan (Con)	J. Kemp (Lib)	S. Dixon (Con)
1904	H. Heenan (Con)	J. Kemp (Lib)	S. Dixon (Con)
1905	J. E. Gilchrist (Lab)	J. Kemp (Lib)	S. Dixon (Con)
1906	J. E. Gilchrist (Lab)	J. Kemp (Lib)	S. Dixon (Con)
1907	J. E. Gilchrist (Lab)	J. Kemp (Lib)	S. Dixon (Con)
1908	J. Hamnett (Con)	J. Kemp (Lib)	S. Dixon (Con)
February 1909	J. Hamnett (Con)	J. Kemp (Lib)	R. Chesters (Con)
1909	J. Hamnett (Con)	J. Kemp (Lib)	R. Chesters (Con)
1910	J. Hamnett (Con)	J. Kemp (Lib)	R. Chesters (Con)
1911	J. Fogarty (Lab)	J. Kemp (Lib)	R. Chesters (Con)
1912	J. Fogarty (Lab)	J. Kemp (Lib)	R. Chesters (Con)
1913	J. Fogarty (Lab)	J. Kemp (Lib)	R. Chesters (Con)
1914	J. Fogarty (Lab)	J. Kemp (Lib)	R. Chesters (Con)
May 1919	J. Fogarty (Lab)	A. James (Lab)	R. Chesters (Con)
1919	J. Fogarty (Lab)	A. James (Lab)	C. E. Wood (Lab)
1920	J. Fogarty (Lab)	A. James (Lab)	C. E. Wood (Lab)
1921	S. Bloor (Con)	A. James (Lab)	C. E. Wood (Lab)
1922	S. Bloor (Con)	A. James (Lab)	J. Travis (Con)
1923	S. Bloor (Con)	A. James (Lab)	J. Travis (Con)
1924	S. Bloor (Con)	A. James (Lab)	J. Travis (Con)
1925	S. Bloor (Con)	A. James (Lab)	D. Taylor (Lab)
1926	S. Bloor (Con)	A. James (Lab)	D. Taylor (Lab)
1927	C. E. Wood (Lab)	A. James (Lab)	D. Taylor (Lab)
1928	C. E. Wood (Lab)	A. James (Lab)	D. Taylor (Lab)
1929	C. E. Wood (Lab)	A. James (Lab)	D. Taylor (Lab)
1930	C. E. Wood (Lab)	A. James (Lab)	D. Taylor (Lab)
1931	C. E. Wood (Lab)	A. James (Lab)	J. Vickers (Con)
1932	C. E. Wood (Lab)	A. James (Lab)	J. Vickers (Con)
1933	C. E. Wood (Lab)	A. James (Lab)	J. Vickers (Con)
1934	C. E. Wood (Lab)	A. James (Lab)	W. C. Chadwick (Lab)
September 1935	F. C. Mason (Lab)	A. James (Lab)	W. C. Chadwick (Lab)
1935	F. C. Mason (Lab)	E. J. Howarth (Lab)	W. C. Chadwick (Lab)
1936	F. C. Mason (Lab)	E. J. Howarth (Lab)	W. C. Chadwick (Lab)
1937	F. C. Mason (Lab)	E. J. Howarth (Lab)	W. C. Chadwick (Lab)
1938	F. C. Mason (Lab)	E. J. Howarth (Lab)	W. C. Chadwick (Lab)
1945	W. F. Irvine (Lab)	E. J. Howarth (Lab)	W. C. Chadwick (Lab)
1946	W. F. Irvine (Lab)	E. J. Howarth (Lab)	W. C. Chadwick (Lab)
1947	W. F. Irvine (Lab)	E. J. Howarth (Lab)	W. C. Chadwick (Lab)
February 1948	H. Quinney (Lab)	E. J. Howarth (Lab)	W. C. Chadwick (Lab)
1949	H. Quinney (Lab)	E. J. Howarth (Lab)	W. C. Chadwick (Lab)
December 1949	H. Quinney (Lab)	L. M. Lever (Lab)	W. C. Chadwick (Lab)
1950	H. Quinney (Lab)	L. M. Lever (Lab)	W. C. Chadwick (Lab)
1951	H. Quinney (Lab)	J. H. F. Eccles (Lab)	W. C. Chadwick (Lab)
1952	H. Quinney (Lab)	J. H. F. Eccles (Lab)	W. C. Chadwick (Lab)
August 1952	A. Stevenson (Lab)	J. H. F. Eccles (Lab)	W. C. Chadwick (Lab)
1953	A. Stevenson (Lab)	J. H. F. Eccles (Lab)	W. C. Chadwick (Lab)
1954	A. Stevenson (Lab)	J. H. F. Eccles (Lab)	W. C. Chadwick (Lab)
July 1954	A. Stevenson (Lab)	J. H. F. Eccles (Lab)	C. R. Morris (Lab)
1955	A. Stevenson (Lab)	J. H. F. Eccles (Lab)	C. R. Morris (Lab)
1956	A. Stevenson (Lab)	J. H. F. Eccles (Lab)	C. R. Morris (Lab)
1957	A. Stevenson (Lab)	J. H. F. Eccles (Lab)	C. R. Morris (Lab)
1958	R. P. Hughes (Lab)	J. H. F. Eccles (Lab)	C. R. Morris (Lab)
1959	R. P. Hughes (Lab)	J. H. F. Eccles (Lab)	C. R. Morris (Lab)
1960	R. P. Hughes (Lab)	E. V. Hughes (Lab)	C. R. Morris (Lab)
1961	R. P. Hughes (Lab)	E. V. Hughes (Lab)	C. R. Morris (Lab)
1962	R. P. Hughes (Lab)	E. V. Hughes (Lab)	C. R. Morris (Lab)
1963	R. P. Hughes (Lab)	E. V. Hughes (Lab)	C. R. Morris (Lab)
1964	H. W. Bliss (Lab)	E. V. Hughes (Lab)	J. S. Goldstone (Lab)
1965	H. W. Bliss (Lab)	E. V. Hughes (Lab)	J. S. Goldstone (Lab)
1966	H. W. Bliss (Lab)	E. V. Hughes (Lab)	J. S. Goldstone (Lab)
1967	G. Fildes (Con)	E. V. Hughes (Lab)	J. S. Goldstone (Lab)
1968	G. Fildes (Con)	E. V. Hughes (Lab)	F. W. Lever (Con)
October 1968	G. Fildes (Con)	J. S. Goldstone (Lab)	F. W. Lever (Con)
1969	G. Fildes (Con)	J. S. Goldstone (Lab)	F. W. Lever (Con)
1970	D. Healey (Lab)	J. S. Goldstone (Lab)	F. W. Lever (Con)
1971	E. Donoghue (Lab)	E. Crank (Lab)	R. Latham (Lab)
1972	E. Donoghue (Lab)	E. Crank (Lab)	R. Latham (Lab)
1973	E. Crank (Lab)	R. Latham (Lab)	E. Donoghue (Lab)
1975	E. Crank (Lab)	R. Latham (Lab)	E. Donoghue (Lab)
1976	E. Crank (Lab)	R. Latham (Lab)	E. Donoghue (Lab)
1978	G. Conquest (Lab)	R. Latham (Lab)	E. Donoghue (Lab)
1979	G. Conquest (Lab)	R. Latham (Lab)	P. Conquest (Lab)
1980	G. Conquest (Lab)	R. Latham (Lab)	P. Conquest (Lab)

== Elections ==
=== Elections in 1890s ===
==== November 1890 ====
1890 (3 vacancies)
Party	Candidate	Votes	%	±%
Conservative	H. Morgan	uncontested		
Liberal	J. Bowes	uncontested		
Conservative	H. Tetlow	uncontested		
Conservative win (new seat)				
Liberal win (new seat)				
Conservative win (new seat)				

==== November 1891 ====
1891
Party	Candidate	Votes	%	±%
Conservative	H. Tetlow*	uncontested		
Conservative hold		Swing		

==== November 1892 ====
1892
Party	Candidate	Votes	%	±%
Liberal	J. Bowes*	uncontested		
Liberal hold		Swing		

==== November 1893 ====
1893
Party	Candidate	Votes	%	±%
Conservative	H. Morgan*	1,126	57.7	N/A
Ind. Labour Party	J. Billam	826	42.3	N/A
Majority		300	15.4	N/A
Turnout		1,952		
Conservative hold		Swing		

==== November 1894 ====
1894
Party	Candidate	Votes	%	±%
Conservative	S. Dixon	1,083	49.7	−8.0
Ind. Labour Party	H. Henshall	607	27.9	−14.4
Liberal	E. McGee	488	22.4	N/A
Majority		476	21.9	+6.5
Turnout		2,178		
Conservative hold		Swing		

==== November 1895 ====
1895
Party	Candidate	Votes	%	±%
Liberal	J. Bowes*	995	47.0	+24.6
Conservative	T. Milnes	882	41.7	−8.0
Ind. Labour Party	T. Cook	238	11.3	−16.6
Majority		113	5.3	
Turnout		2,115		
Liberal hold		Swing		

==== November 1896 ====
1896
Party	Candidate	Votes	%	±%
Conservative	T. Milnes	1,065	51.3	+9.6
Lib-Lab	G. D. Kelley	1,013	48.7	+1.7
Majority		52	2.6	
Turnout		2,078		
Conservative hold		Swing		

==== November 1897 ====
1897
Party	Candidate	Votes	%	±%
Conservative	S. Dixon*	uncontested		
Conservative hold		Swing		

==== November 1898 ====
1898
Party	Candidate	Votes	%	±%
Liberal	J. Bowes*	uncontested		
Liberal hold		Swing		

==== November 1899 ====
1899
Party	Candidate	Votes	%	±%
Conservative	T. Milnes*	uncontested		
Conservative hold		Swing		

=== Elections in 1900s ===
==== November 1900 ====
1900
Party	Candidate	Votes	%	±%
Conservative	S. Dixon*	uncontested		
Conservative hold		Swing		

==== November 1901 ====
1901
Party	Candidate	Votes	%	±%
Liberal	J. Bowes*	uncontested		
Liberal hold		Swing		

==== November 1902 ====
1902
Party	Candidate	Votes	%	±%
Conservative	H. Heenan*	uncontested		
Conservative hold		Swing		

==== November 1903 ====
1903
Party	Candidate	Votes	%	±%
Conservative	S. Dixon*	1,201	57.0	N/A
Independent	G. Stephenson	907	43.0	N/A
Majority		294	14.0	N/A
Turnout		2,108		
Conservative hold		Swing		

==== November 1903 (by-election) ====
By-election: 18 November 1903
Party	Candidate	Votes	%	±%
Liberal	J. Kemp	1,357	62.2	N/A
Independent	G. Stephenson	824	37.8	−5.2
Majority		533	24.4	
Turnout		2,181		
Liberal hold		Swing		

==== November 1904 ====
1904
Party	Candidate	Votes	%	±%
Liberal	J. Kemp*	1,148	55.5	N/A
Labour	J. E. Gilchrist	919	44.5	N/A
Majority		229	11.0	
Turnout		2,067		
Liberal hold		Swing		

==== November 1905 ====
1905
Party	Candidate	Votes	%	±%
Labour	J. E. Gilchrist	1,097	56.7	+12.2
Conservative	H. Heenan*	838	43.3	N/A
Majority		259	13.4	
Turnout		1,935		
Labour gain from Conservative		Swing		

==== November 1906 ====
1906
Party	Candidate	Votes	%	±%
Conservative	S. Dixon*	1,294	56.6	+13.3
Labour	F. Lowe	992	43.4	−13.3
Majority		302	13.2	
Turnout		2,286		
Conservative hold		Swing		

==== November 1907 ====
1907
Party	Candidate	Votes	%	±%
Liberal	J. Kemp*	uncontested		
Liberal hold		Swing		

==== November 1908 ====
1908
Party	Candidate	Votes	%	±%
Conservative	J. Hamnett	1,433	56.8	N/A
Labour	J. E. Gilchrist*	1,091	43.2	N/A
Majority		342	13.6	N/A
Turnout		2,524		
Conservative gain from Labour		Swing		

==== February 1909 (by-election) ====
By-election: 3 February 1909
Party	Candidate	Votes	%	±%
Conservative	R. Chesters	981	44.7	−12.1
Labour	J. E. Gilchrist	859	39.1	−4.1
Liberal	C. Thorpe	357	16.2	N/A
Majority		122	5.6	−8.0
Turnout		2,197		
Conservative hold		Swing		

==== November 1909 ====
1909
Party	Candidate	Votes	%	±%
Conservative	R. Chesters*	1,388	54.3	−2.5
Labour	J. E. Gilchrist	1,168	45.7	+2.5
Majority		220	8.6	−5.0
Turnout		2,556		
Conservative hold		Swing		

=== Elections in 1910s ===
==== November 1910 ====
1910
Party	Candidate	Votes	%	±%
Liberal	J. Kemp*	1,238	85.4	N/A
Conservative	G. Stephenson	212	14.6	−39.7
Majority		1,026	70.8	
Turnout		1,450		
Liberal hold		Swing		

==== November 1911 ====
1911
Party	Candidate	Votes	%	±%
Labour	J. Fogarty	1,412	52.9	N/A
Conservative	J. Hamnett*	1,259	47.1	+32.5
Majority		153	5.8	
Turnout		2,671		
Labour gain from Conservative		Swing		

==== November 1912 ====
1912
Party	Candidate	Votes	%	±%
Conservative	R. Chesters*	1,531	58.8	+11.7
Labour	H. H. Laurie	1,073	41.2	−11.7
Majority		458	17.6	
Turnout		2,604		
Conservative hold		Swing		

==== November 1913 ====
1913
Party	Candidate	Votes	%	±%
Liberal	J. Kemp*	uncontested		
Liberal hold		Swing		

==== November 1914 ====
1914
Party	Candidate	Votes	%	±%
Labour	J. Fogarty*	uncontested		
Labour hold		Swing		

==== May 1919 (by-election) ====
By-election: 6 May 1919
Party	Candidate	Votes	%	±%
Labour	A. James	3,097	70.7	
Conservative	W. Hartley	746	17.0	
Liberal	J. Hart	540	12.3	
Majority		2,351	53.7	
Turnout		4,383		
Labour gain from Liberal		Swing		

==== November 1919 ====
1919 (new boundaries)
Party	Candidate	Votes	%	±%
Labour	C. E. Wood	uncontested		
Labour gain from Conservative		Swing		

=== Elections in 1920s ===
==== November 1920 ====
1920
Party	Candidate	Votes	%	±%
Labour	A. James*	2,992	59.3	N/A
Conservative	S. Bloor	2,050	40.7	N/A
Majority		942	18.6	N/A
Turnout		5,042	52.4	N/A
Labour hold		Swing		

==== November 1921 ====
1921
Party	Candidate	Votes	%	±%
Conservative	S. Bloor	3,281	55.7	+15.0
Labour	J. Fogarty*	2,607	44.3	−15.0
Majority		674	11.4	
Turnout		5,888	61.6	+9.2
Conservative gain from Labour		Swing		

==== November 1922 ====
1922
Party	Candidate	Votes	%	±%
Conservative	J. Travis	3,041	46.9	−8.8
Labour	C. E. Wood*	2,719	42.0	−2.3
Liberal	H. Pinnington	718	11.1	N/A
Majority		322	4.9	−6.5
Turnout		6,478	67.2	+5.6
Conservative gain from Labour		Swing		

==== November 1923 ====
1923
Party	Candidate	Votes	%	±%
Labour	A. James*	3,383	57.1	+15.1
Conservative	T. McRoy	2,538	42.9	−4.0
Majority		845	14.2	
Turnout		5,921		
Labour hold		Swing		

==== November 1924 ====
1924
Party	Candidate	Votes	%	±%
Conservative	S. Bloor*	3,463	50.1	+7.2
Labour	D. Taylor	3,459	49.9	−7.2
Majority		4	0.2	
Turnout		6,922		
Conservative hold		Swing		

==== November 1925 ====
1925
Party	Candidate	Votes	%	±%
Labour	D. Taylor	3,939	53.4	+3.5
Conservative	J. Travis*	3,436	46.6	−3.5
Majority		503	6.8	
Turnout		7,375	72.0	
Labour gain from Conservative		Swing		

==== November 1926 ====
1926
Party	Candidate	Votes	%	±%
Labour	A. James*	4,148	61.0	+7.6
Conservative	A. Shepherd	2,653	39.0	−7.6
Majority		1,495	22.0	+15.2
Turnout		6,801	65.6	−6.4
Labour hold		Swing		

==== November 1927 ====
1927
Party	Candidate	Votes	%	±%
Labour	C. E. Wood	3,667	55.6	−5.4
Conservative	S. Bloor*	2,933	44.4	+5.4
Majority		734	11.2	−10.8
Turnout		6,600	64.4	−1.2
Labour gain from Conservative		Swing		

==== November 1928 ====
1928
Party	Candidate	Votes	%	±%
Labour	D. Taylor*	3,751	55.3	−0.3
Conservative	S. Bloor	2,997	44.2	−0.2
Residents	A. R. Edwards	34	0.5	N/A
Majority		754	11.1	−0.1
Turnout		5,772	66.1	+1.7
Labour hold		Swing		

==== November 1929 ====
1929
Party	Candidate	Votes	%	±%
Labour	A. James*	3,621	64.7	+9.4
Conservative	S. Bloor	1,954	34.9	−9.3
Residents	A. R. Edwards	18	0.4	−0.1
Majority		1,667	29.8	+18.7
Turnout		5,593	50.2	−15.9
Labour hold		Swing		

=== Elections in 1930s ===
==== November 1930 ====
1930
Party	Candidate	Votes	%	±%
Labour	C. E. Wood*	2,778	54.0	−10.7
Conservative	A. Hodgson	2,371	46.0	+11.1
Majority		407	8.0	−21.8
Turnout		5,149		
Labour hold		Swing		

==== November 1931 ====
1931
Party	Candidate	Votes	%	±%
Conservative	J. Vickers	3,422	53.1	+7.1
Labour	W. Lewis	3,023	46.9	−7.1
Majority		399	6.2	
Turnout		6,445	59.5	
Conservative gain from Labour		Swing		

==== November 1932 ====
1932
Party	Candidate	Votes	%	±%
Labour	A. James*	4,287	67.4	+20.5
Conservative	C. B. Walker	2,074	32.6	−20.5
Majority		2,213	34.8	
Turnout		6,361		
Labour hold		Swing		

==== November 1933 ====
1933
Party	Candidate	Votes	%	±%
Labour	C. E. Wood*	3,639	67.0	−0.4
Conservative	R. Jackson	1,790	33.0	+0.4
Majority		1,849	34.0	−0.8
Turnout		5,429		
Labour hold		Swing		

==== November 1934 ====
1934
Party	Candidate	Votes	%	±%
Labour	W. C. Chadwick	3,720	66.8	−0.2
Conservative	J. Vickers*	1,846	33.2	+0.2
Majority		1,874	33.6	−0.4
Turnout		5,566		
Labour gain from Conservative		Swing		

==== September 1935 (by-election) ====
By-election: 19 September 1935
Party	Candidate	Votes	%	±%
Labour	F. C. Mason	uncontested		
Labour hold		Swing		

==== November 1935 ====
1935
Party	Candidate	Votes	%	±%
Labour	E. J. Howarth	3,136	63.1	−3.7
Conservative	L. Turner	1,834	36.9	+3.7
Majority		1,302	26.2	−7.4
Turnout		4,970		
Labour hold		Swing		

==== November 1936 ====
1936
Party	Candidate	Votes	%	±%
Labour	F. C. Mason*	uncontested		
Labour hold		Swing		

==== November 1937 ====
1937
Party	Candidate	Votes	%	±%
Labour	W. C. Chadwick*	uncontested		
Labour hold		Swing		

==== November 1938 ====
1938
Party	Candidate	Votes	%	±%
Labour	E. J. Howarth*	2,349	52.6	N/A
Conservative	T. A. Harrop	2,114	47.4	N/A
Majority		235	5.2	N/A
Turnout		4,463		
Labour hold		Swing		

=== Elections in 1940s ===
==== November 1945 ====
1945
Party	Candidate	Votes	%	±%
Labour	W. F. Irvine*	2,627	64.3	+11.7
Conservative	A. H. Ball	1,461	35.7	−11.7
Majority		1,166	28.6	+23.4
Turnout		4,088	39.8	
Labour hold		Swing		

==== November 1946 ====
1946
Party	Candidate	Votes	%	±%
Labour	W. C. Chadwick*	2,973	60.4	−3.9
Conservative	W. L. Goodfellow	1,948	39.6	+3.9
Majority		1,025	20.8	−7.8
Turnout		4,921		
Labour hold		Swing		

==== November 1947 ====
1947
Party	Candidate	Votes	%	±%
Labour	E. J. Howarth*	3,357	57.2	−3.2
Conservative	J. Priestley	2,512	42.8	+3.2
Majority		845	14.4	−6.4
Turnout		5,869		
Labour hold		Swing		

==== February 1948 (by-election) ====
By-election: 5 February 1948
Party	Candidate	Votes	%	±%
Labour	H. Quinney	2,628	52.4	−4.8
Conservative	J. Priestley	2,390	47.6	+4.8
Majority		238	4.8	−9.6
Turnout		5,018		
Labour hold		Swing		

==== May 1949 ====
1949
Party	Candidate	Votes	%	±%
Labour	H. Quinney*	3,242	58.6	+1.4
Conservative	J. Priestley	2,290	41.4	−1.4
Majority		952	17.2	+2.8
Turnout		5,532		
Labour hold		Swing		

==== December 1949 (by-election) ====
By-election: 15 December 1949
Party	Candidate	Votes	%	±%
Labour	L. M. Lever	2,783	61.6	+3.0
Conservative	F. E. Doran	1,732	38.4	−3.0
Majority		1,051	23.2	+6.0
Turnout		4,515		
Labour hold		Swing		

=== Elections in 1950s ===
==== May 1950 ====
1950 (new boundaries)
Party	Candidate	Votes	%	±%
Labour	W. C. Chadwick*	2,949	62.7	
Conservative	J. D. Cheetham	1,755	37.3	
Majority		1,194	25.4	
Turnout		4,704		
Labour hold		Swing		

==== May 1951 ====
1951
Party	Candidate	Votes	%	±%
Labour	J. H. F. Eccles	2,445	56.6	−6.1
Conservative	E. D. Houseley	1,873	43.4	+6.1
Majority		572	13.2	−12.2
Turnout		4,318		
Labour hold		Swing		

==== May 1952 ====
1952
Party	Candidate	Votes	%	±%
Labour	H. Quinney*	3,881	72.9	+16.3
Conservative	E. D. Houseley	1,443	27.1	−16.3
Majority		2,438	45.8	+32.6
Turnout		5,324		
Labour hold		Swing		

==== August 1952 (by-election) ====
By-election: 28 August 1952
Party	Candidate	Votes	%	±%
Labour	A. Stevenson	2,789	68.6	−4.3
Conservative	M. V. Sparks	1,276	31.4	+4.3
Majority		1,513	37.2	−8.6
Turnout		4,065		
Labour hold		Swing		

==== May 1953 ====
1953
Party	Candidate	Votes	%	±%
Labour	W. C. Chadwick*	2,840	70.3	−2.6
Conservative	M. V. Sparks	1,200	29.7	+2.6
Majority		1,640	40.6	−5.2
Turnout		4,040		
Labour hold		Swing		

==== May 1954 ====
1954
Party	Candidate	Votes	%	±%
Labour	J. H. F. Eccles*	2,449	68.4	−1.9
Conservative	E. Pelham	1,131	31.6	+1.9
Majority		1,318	36.8	−3.8
Turnout		3,580		
Labour hold		Swing		

==== July 1954 (by-election) ====
By-election: 15 July 1954
Party	Candidate	Votes	%	±%
Labour	C. R. Morris	1,829	64.2	−4.2
Conservative	E. Pelham	1,021	35.8	+4.2
Majority		808	28.4	−8.4
Turnout		2,850		
Labour hold		Swing		

==== May 1955 ====
1955
Party	Candidate	Votes	%	±%
Labour	A. Stevenson*	2,179	60.4	−8.0
Conservative	A. Gilbert	1,426	39.6	+8.0
Majority		753	20.8	−16.0
Turnout		3,605		
Labour hold		Swing		

==== May 1956 ====
1956
Party	Candidate	Votes	%	±%
Labour	C. R. Morris*	1,878	69.3	+8.9
Conservative	T. E. Downes	832	30.7	−8.9
Majority		1,046	38.6	+17.8
Turnout		2,710		
Labour hold		Swing		

==== May 1957 ====
1957
Party	Candidate	Votes	%	±%
Labour	J. H. F. Eccles*	1,809	69.5	+0.2
Conservative	M. V. Sparks	794	30.5	−0.2
Majority		1,015	39.0	+0.4
Turnout		2,603		
Labour hold		Swing		

==== May 1958 ====
1958
Party	Candidate	Votes	%	±%
Labour	R. P. Hughes	1,888	73.1	+3.6
Conservative	A. Gilbert	693	26.9	−3.6
Majority		1,195	46.2	+7.2
Turnout		2,581		
Labour hold		Swing		

==== May 1959 ====
1959
Party	Candidate	Votes	%	±%
Labour	C. R. Morris*	1,716	67.0	−6.1
Conservative	J. Hall	847	33.0	+6.1
Majority		869	34.0	−12.2
Turnout		2,563		
Labour hold		Swing		

=== Elections in 1960s ===
==== May 1960 ====
1960
Party	Candidate	Votes	%	±%
Labour	E. V. Hughes	1,288	57.3	−9.7
Conservative	J. D. Cheetham	960	42.7	+9.7
Majority		328	14.6	−19.4
Turnout		2,248		
Labour hold		Swing		

==== May 1961 ====
1961
Party	Candidate	Votes	%	±%
Labour	R. P. Hughes*	1,552	60.3	+3.0
Conservative	J. D. Cheetham	1,022	39.7	−3.0
Majority		530	20.6	+6.0
Turnout		2,574		
Labour hold		Swing		

==== May 1962 ====
1962
Party	Candidate	Votes	%	±%
Labour	C. R. Morris*	1,803	65.6	+5.3
Conservative	J. H. Tresman	872	31.8	−8.1
Union Movement	C. D. Draffin	71	2.6	N/A
Majority		931	33.8	+13.2
Turnout		2,746		
Labour hold		Swing		

==== May 1963 ====
1963
Party	Candidate	Votes	%	±%
Labour	E. V. Hughes*	1,780	69.3	+3.7
Conservative	J. H. Tresman	788	30.7	−1.1
Majority		992	38.6	+4.8
Turnout		2,568		
Labour hold		Swing		

==== May 1964 ====
1964 (2 vacancies)
Party	Candidate	Votes	%	±%
Labour	H. W. Bliss	1,392	64.2	−5.1
Labour	J. S. Goldstone	1,364	62.9	−6.4
Conservative	G. Fildes	792	36.5	+5.8
Conservative	C. Warburton	787	36.3	+5.6
Majority		572	26.4	−12.2
Turnout		2,168		
Labour hold		Swing		

==== May 1965 ====
1965
Party	Candidate	Votes	%	±%
Labour	J. S. Goldstone*	920	52.2	−12.0
Conservative	G. Fildes	793	45.0	+8.5
Communist	B. Panter	51	2.8	N/A
Majority		127	7.2	−19.2
Turnout		1,764		
Labour hold		Swing		

==== May 1966 ====
1966
Party	Candidate	Votes	%	±%
Labour	E. V. Hughes*	820	56.8	+4.6
Conservative	G. Fildes	623	43.2	−1.8
Majority		197	13.6	+6.4
Turnout		1,443		
Labour hold		Swing		

==== May 1967 ====
1967
Party	Candidate	Votes	%	±%
Conservative	G. Fildes	952	54.7	+11.2
Labour	H. W. Bliss*	788	45.3	−11.5
Majority		164	9.4	
Turnout		1,740		
Conservative gain from Labour		Swing		

==== May 1968 ====
1968
Party	Candidate	Votes	%	±%
Conservative	F. W. Lever	983	52.5	−2.2
Labour	J. S. Goldstone*	888	47.5	+2.2
Majority		95	5.0	−4.4
Turnout		1,871		
Conservative gain from Labour		Swing		

==== October 1968 (by-election) ====
By-election: 24 October 1968
Party	Candidate	Votes	%	±%
Labour	J. S. Goldstone	1,124	58.2	+10.7
Conservative	J. Priestley	806	41.8	−10.7
Majority		318	16.4	
Turnout		1,930		
Labour hold		Swing		

==== May 1969 ====
1969
Party	Candidate	Votes	%	±%
Labour	J. S. Goldstone*	1,484	63.3	+15.8
Conservative	E. Smith	860	36.7	−15.8
Majority		624	26.6	+21.6
Turnout		2,344		
Labour hold		Swing		

=== Elections in 1970s ===
==== May 1970 ====
1970
Party	Candidate	Votes	%	±%
Labour	D. Healey	1,455	63.2	−0.1
Conservative	G. Fildes*	829	36.0	−0.7
Residents	G. McKenzie-Jones	18	0.8	N/A
Majority		626	27.2	+0.6
Turnout		2,302		
Labour gain from Conservative		Swing		

==== May 1971 ====
1971 (3 vacancies; new boundaries)
Party	Candidate	Votes	%	±%
Labour	E. Donoghue*	2,732	90.6	
Labour	E. Crank*	2,731	90.6	
Labour	R. Latham*	2,618	86.9	
Conservative	D. Porter	292	9.7	
Conservative	P. J. Sturrock	238	7.9	
Conservative	A. R. Whittle	225	7.5	
Communist	R. G. A. Cole	205	6.8	
Majority		2,326	77.2	
Turnout		3,014		
Labour win (new seat)				
Labour win (new seat)				
Labour win (new seat)				

==== May 1972 ====
1972
Party	Candidate	Votes	%	±%
Labour	R. Latham*	1,829	85.7	−4.9
Conservative	D. Porter	305	14.3	+4.6
Majority		1,524	71.4	−5.8
Turnout		2,134		
Labour hold		Swing		

==== May 1973 ====
1973 (3 vacancies; reorganisation)
Party	Candidate	Votes	%	±%
Labour	E. Crank*	1,240	72.6	−13.1
Labour	R. Latham*	1,209	70.7	−15.0
Labour	E. Donoghue*	1,194	69.9	−15.8
Anti-Immigration	M. R. Goucher	368	21.5	N/A
Conservative	A. Chappell	219	12.8	−1.5
Conservative	H. Lee	214	12.5	−1.8
Conservative	M. Howells	182	10.6	−3.7
Majority		826	48.3	−23.1
Turnout		1,709		
Labour hold		Swing		
Labour hold		Swing		
Labour hold		Swing		

==== May 1975 ====
1975
Party	Candidate	Votes	%	±%
Labour	E. Donoghue*	973	72.3	+4.5
Conservative	A. Chappell	372	27.7	+15.7
Majority		601	44.7	−11.2
Turnout		1,345		
Labour hold		Swing	-5.6	

==== May 1976 ====
1976
Party	Candidate	Votes	%	±%
Labour	R. Latham*	1,715	79.3	+7.0
Conservative	A. E. Halliday	448	20.7	−7.0
Majority		1,267	58.6	+13.9
Turnout		2,163		
Labour hold		Swing	+7.0	

==== May 1978 ====
1978
Party	Candidate	Votes	%	±%
Labour	G. Conquest	1,417	76.3	−3.0
Conservative	A. E. Halliday	337	18.1	−2.6
National Front	N. T. G. Wallace	103	5.5	+5.5
Majority		1,080	58.2	−0.4
Turnout		1,857	24.0	
Labour hold		Swing	-0.2	

==== May 1979 ====
1979
Party	Candidate	Votes	%	±%
Labour	P. Conquest	3,193	76.8	+0.5
Conservative	J. Cartland	737	17.7	−0.4
Liberal	J. A. Turrell	228	5.5	+5.5
Majority		2,456	59.1	+0.9
Turnout		4,158	62.0	+38.0
Labour hold		Swing	+0.4	

=== Elections in 1980s ===
==== May 1980 ====
1980
Party	Candidate	Votes	%	±%
Labour	R. Latham*	1,905	90.3	+13.5
Conservative	A. E. Halliday	148	7.0	−10.7
Liberal	P. Bailey	57	2.7	−2.8
Majority		1,757	83.3	+24.2
Turnout		2,110	31.1	−30.9
Labour hold		Swing	+12.1	

== See also ==
- Manchester City Council
- Manchester City Council elections
