= 1949 Manchester City Council election =

Local election in Manchester, England

- 12 May 1949

36 of 144 seats to Manchester City Council 73 seats needed for a majority
	First party	Second party	Third party
Party	Conservative	Labour	Liberal
Last election	23 seats, 52.7%	13 seats, 41.9%	0 seats, 4.5%
Seats before	66	70	8
Seats won	19	17	0
Seats after	72	64	8
Seat change	▲6	▼6	Steady
Popular vote	127,390	116,147	12,946
Percentage	49.1%	44.8%	5.0%
Swing	▼3.6%	▲2.9%	▲0.5%
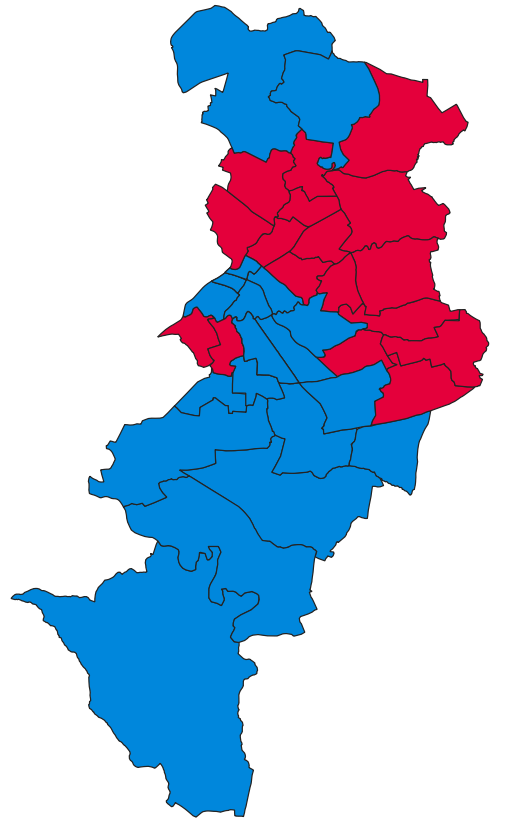
- Map of results of 1949 election
Leader of the Council before election
No overall control
Leader of the Council after election
No overall control

Elections to Manchester City Council were held on Thursday, 12 May 1949. One third of the councillors seats were up for election, with each successful candidate to serve a three-year term of office. The council remained under no overall control.

== Election result ==
Party	Votes		Seats			Full Council	
Conservative Party	127,390 (49.1%)	▼3.6	19 (52.8%)	19 / 36	▲6	72 (50.0%)	72 / 144
Labour Party	116,147 (44.8%)	▲2.9	17 (47.2%)	17 / 36	▼6	64 (44.4%)	64 / 144
Liberal Party	12,946 (5.0%)	▲0.5	0 (0.0%)	0 / 36	Steady	8 (5.6%)	8 / 144
Communist	1,910 (0.7%)	▼0.1	0 (0.0%)	0 / 36	Steady	0 (0.0%)	0 / 144
Independent Conservative	719 (0.3%)	N/A	0 (0.0%)	0 / 36	N/A	0 (0.0%)	0 / 144
Independent	89 (0.0%)	Steady	0 (0.0%)	0 / 36	Steady	0 (0.0%)	0 / 144

=== Full council ===
↓
64	8	72

=== Aldermen ===
↓
16	7	13

=== Councillors ===
↓
48	1	59

== Ward results ==
=== All Saints' ===
All Saints'
Party	Candidate	Votes	%	±%
Conservative	N. G. Westbrook	2,117	53.8	−1.7
Labour	F. Evans*	1,820	46.2	+1.7
Majority		297	7.6	−3.4
Turnout		3,937		
Conservative gain from Labour		Swing		

=== Ardwick ===
Ardwick
Party	Candidate	Votes	%	±%
Conservative	T. Dobbins	3,583	50.5	−4.5
Labour	V. Wilson	3,507	49.5	+4.5
Majority		76	1.0	−9.0
Turnout		7,090		
Conservative hold		Swing		

=== Beswick ===
Beswick
Party	Candidate	Votes	%	±%
Labour	W. Winstanley*	5,166	63.7	+5.7
Conservative	W. Morgan	2,803	34.5	−7.5
Communist	T. Royle	146	1.8	N/A
Majority		2,363	29.2	+13.2
Turnout		8,115		
Labour hold		Swing		

=== Blackley ===
Blackley
Party	Candidate	Votes	%	±%
Conservative	J. Hart	5,765	46.1	−5.3
Labour	E. Cruse*	5,077	40.6	+1.0
Liberal	R. Frere	1,537	12.3	+3.3
Communist	M. Cohen	133	1.0	N/A
Majority		688	5.5	−6.3
Turnout		12,512		
Conservative gain from Labour		Swing		

=== Bradford ===
Bradford
Party	Candidate	Votes	%	±%
Labour	R. Malcolm*	5,448	62.7	+6.5
Conservative	A. Gilbert	3,237	37.3	−6.5
Majority		2,211	25.4	+13.0
Turnout		8,685		
Labour hold		Swing		

=== Cheetham ===
Cheetham
Party	Candidate	Votes	%	±%
Labour	H. Goldstone*	3,082	40.3	−4.2
Conservative	N. Lee	2,337	30.6	−8.6
Liberal	S. Needoff	1,959	25.6	+13.6
Communist	M. I. Druck	262	3.5	−0.8
Majority		745	9.8	+4.5
Turnout		7,640		
Labour hold		Swing		

=== Chorlton-cum-Hardy ===
Chorlton-cum-Hardy
Party	Candidate	Votes	%	±%
Conservative	M. S. Whittaker*	10,552	75.0	+9.2
Labour	W. M. Parkinson	3,522	25.0	+1.5
Majority		7,030	50.0	+7.7
Turnout		14,074		
Conservative hold		Swing		

=== Collegiate Church ===
Collegiate Church
Party	Candidate	Votes	%	±%
Labour	B. S. Langton*	1,963	67.0	+20.2
Conservative	J. Brennan	969	33.0	−12.8
Majority		994	34.0	+33.0
Turnout		2,932		
Labour hold		Swing		

=== Collyhurst ===
Collyhurst
Party	Candidate	Votes	%	±%
Labour	R. Malcolm*	2,424	60.4	+6.4
Conservative	W. H. Turney	1,543	38.4	−4.5
Communist	J. B. Cross	47	1.2	−1.9
Majority		881	22.0	+10.9
Turnout		4,014		
Labour hold		Swing		

=== Crumpsall ===
Crumpsall
Party	Candidate	Votes	%	±%
Conservative	N. H. McDowall	4,682	46.4	−9.0
Labour	J. P. Jennings	3,801	37.7	+11.1
Liberal	F. Merryweather	1,609	15.9	+1.0
Majority		881	8.7	−20.1
Turnout		10,092		
Conservative gain from Labour		Swing		

=== Didsbury ===
Didsbury
Party	Candidate	Votes	%	±%
Conservative	E. Hill*	7,363	62.8	−0.9
Labour	L. Fern	2,436	20.8	−0.4
Liberal	G. Escott	1,753	15.0	+2.0
Communist	F. Dean	170	1.5	−0.6
Majority		4,927	42.0	−0.5
Turnout		11,722		
Conservative hold		Swing		

=== Exchange ===
Exchange
Party	Candidate	Votes	%	±%
Conservative	T. E. Bird*	uncontested		
Conservative hold		Swing		

=== Gorton North ===
Gorton North
Party	Candidate	Votes	%	±%
Labour	F. Lord*	5,442	58.5	+2.9
Conservative	A. Leach	3,632	39.1	−5.3
Communist	A. Wilde	225	2.4	N/A
Majority		1,810	19.4	+8.2
Turnout		9,299		
Labour hold		Swing		

=== Gorton South ===
Gorton South
Party	Candidate	Votes	%	±%
Labour	E. A. Yarwood	5,675	58.8	+1.1
Conservative	G. Lancaster	3,978	41.2	−1.1
Majority		1,697	17.6	+2.2
Turnout		9,653		
Labour hold		Swing		

=== Harpurhey ===
Harpurhey
Party	Candidate	Votes	%	±%
Labour	H. P. J. Hinderer*	3,719	51.5	+4.9
Conservative	H. King	3,496	48.5	−3.1
Majority		223	3.0	
Turnout		7,215		
Labour hold		Swing		

=== Levenshulme ===
Levenshulme
Party	Candidate	Votes	%	±%
Conservative	J. Bowes*	4,747	55.1	+4.5
Labour	F. Hatton	2,829	32.9	+0.2
Liberal	W. Fleetwood	1,032	12.0	−4.7
Majority		1,918	22.2	+4.3
Turnout		8,608		
Conservative hold		Swing		

=== Longsight ===
Longsight
Party	Candidate	Votes	%	±%
Conservative	J. G. Hopkins*	5,945	57.7	−2.8
Labour	A. Lees	3,666	35.6	−3.9
Liberal	C. T. Ashton	691	6.7	N/A
Majority		2,279	22.1	+1.1
Turnout		10,302		
Conservative hold		Swing		

=== Medlock Street ===
Medlock Street
Party	Candidate	Votes	%	±%
Labour	A. Littlemore*	2,395	51.4	+6.2
Conservative	J. McGrath*	2,182	46.8	−3.6
Communist	G. Chandler	85	1.8	−1.5
Majority		213	4.6	
Turnout		4,662		
Labour hold		Swing		

=== Miles Platting ===
Miles Platting
Party	Candidate	Votes	%	±%
Labour	H. Quinney*	3,242	58.6	+1.4
Conservative	J. Priestley	2,290	41.4	−1.4
Majority		952	17.2	+2.8
Turnout		5,532		
Labour hold		Swing		

=== Moss Side East ===
Moss Side East
Party	Candidate	Votes	%	±%
Conservative	C. Cuffin	2,857	53.0	−0.3
Labour	A. McAdam	2,421	44.9	+4.3
Communist	L. Johnson	108	2.1	N/A
Majority		436	8.1	−4.6
Turnout		5,386		
Conservative hold		Swing		

=== Moss Side West ===
Moss Side West
Party	Candidate	Votes	%	±%
Conservative	W. H. Cox	3,310	45.4	−11.7
Labour	D. Molloy*	2,701	37.0	−1.0
Ind. Conservative	G. J Playford	719	9.9	N/A
Liberal	J. T. Chapman	567	7.8	+2.9
Majority		709	8.4	−10.7
Turnout		7,297		
Conservative gain from Labour		Swing		

=== Moston ===
Moston
Party	Candidate	Votes	%	±%
Labour	C. C. Lamb*	6,376	49.7	+6.2
Conservative	W. C. Carruthers	6,206	48.4	−0.5
Communist	C. Dalton	240	1.9	N/A
Majority		170	1.3	
Turnout		12,822		
Labour hold		Swing		

=== New Cross ===
New Cross
Party	Candidate	Votes	%	±%
Labour	C. Blackwell	2,463	57.6	−0.7
Conservative	D. Edwards	1,812	42.4	+0.7
Majority		651	15.2	−1.4
Turnout		4,275		
Labour hold		Swing		

=== Newton Heath ===
Newton Heath
Party	Candidate	Votes	%	±%
Labour	A. Logan*	4,969	56.5	+3.9
Conservative	E. Hatch	3,833	43.5	−3.9
Majority		1,136	13.0	+7.8
Turnout		8,802		
Labour hold		Swing		

=== Openshaw ===
Openshaw
Party	Candidate	Votes	%	±%
Labour	L. Thomas*	4,694	61.5	+3.1
Conservative	W. R. Swan	2,819	36.9	−1.0
Communist	S. Wild	122	1.6	−2.1
Majority		1,875	24.6	+4.1
Turnout		7,635		
Labour hold		Swing		

=== Oxford ===
Oxford
Party	Candidate	Votes	%	±%
Conservative	G. B. Cary*	uncontested		
Conservative hold		Swing		

=== Rusholme ===
Rusholme
Party	Candidate	Votes	%	±%
Conservative	H. Stockdale*	5,533	64.9	−3.8
Labour	C. Lynon	2,358	27.7	−3.6
Liberal	G. Bateman	636	7.4	N/A
Majority		3,175	37.2	−0.2
Turnout		8,527		
Conservative hold		Swing		

=== St. Ann's ===
St. Ann's
Party	Candidate	Votes	%	±%
Conservative	W. J. Pegge*	uncontested		
Conservative hold		Swing		

=== St. Clement's ===
St. Clement's
Party	Candidate	Votes	%	±%
Conservative	J. L. Cobon	353	75.8	+8.1
Labour	W. Binns	113	24.2	+7.6
Majority		240	51.6	+0.5
Turnout		466		
Conservative hold		Swing		

=== St. George's ===
St. George's
Party	Candidate	Votes	%	±%
Labour	R. E. Thomas*	2,702	51.2	+4.6
Conservative	F. Hyde	2,484	47.1	−6.3
Independent	J. Gillespie	89	1.7	N/A
Majority		218	4.1	
Turnout		5,275		
Labour hold		Swing		

=== St. John's ===
St. John's
Party	Candidate	Votes	%	±%
Conservative	J. E. Burgess*	uncontested		
Conservative hold		Swing		

=== St. Luke's ===
St. Luke's
Party	Candidate	Votes	%	±%
Conservative	J. F. Martin	3,495	55.9	−3.0
Labour	W. Massey	2,756	44.1	+3.0
Majority		739	11.8	−6.0
Turnout		6,251		
Conservative gain from Labour		Swing		

=== St. Mark's ===
St. Mark's
Party	Candidate	Votes	%	±%
Labour	T. M. Larrad*	4,146	58.7	+2.7
Conservative	W. Sharp	2,912	41.3	−2.7
Majority		1,234	17.4	+5.4
Turnout		7,058		
Labour hold		Swing		

=== St. Michael's ===
St. Michael's
Party	Candidate	Votes	%	±%
Labour	A. Donovan*	2,052	66.4	−0.9
Conservative	S. J. G. Cobb	1,040	33.6	+0.9
Majority		1,012	32.8	−1.8
Turnout		3,092		
Labour hold		Swing		

=== Withington ===
Withington
Party	Candidate	Votes	%	±%
Conservative	G. Lord*	10,713	56.8	−4.9
Labour	J. W. Upton	5,539	39.4	−0.6
Liberal	A. J. Higson	2,608	13.8	+5.5
Majority		5,174	27.4	−4.3
Turnout		18,860		
Conservative hold		Swing		

=== Wythenshawe ===
Wythenshawe
Party	Candidate	Votes	%	±%
Conservative	S. Ralphs	8,802	50.7	−2.3
Labour	W. Frost*	7,643	44.0	−0.4
Liberal	R. T. Taylor	554	3.2	N/A
Communist	G. Taylor	372	2.1	−0.5
Majority		1,159	6.7	−1.9
Turnout		17,371		
Conservative gain from Labour		Swing		

== Aldermanic elections ==
=== Aldermanic election, 25 May 1949 ===
At the meeting of the council on 25 May 1949, the terms of office of eighteen aldermen expired.

The following eighteen were elected as aldermen by the council on 25 May 1949 for a term of six years.

Party	Alderman	Ward	Term expires
Conservative	James Edward Burgess	Didsbury	1955
Labour	Andrew Cathcart*	Medlock Street	1955
Conservative	S. P. Dawson*	Newton Heath	1955
Liberal	Mary Gibbons*	St. Clement's	1955
Labour	Frank Gregson*	Withington	1955
Conservative	George Sutton Grindley*	Gorton North	1955
Labour	Elijah John Hart*	New Cross	1955
Labour	Stanley Hitchbun*	St. George's	1955
Conservative	William Phillip Jackson*	St. John's	1955
Labour	Alfred James*	Beswick	1955
Conservative	Mary Latchford Kingsmill Jones*	Wythenshawe	1955
Conservative	Sir William Kay*	Rusholme	1955
Labour	William Oldfield M.P.*	All Saints'	1955
Labour	Wright Robinson*	Blackley	1955
Labour	Harry Thorneycroft M.P.*	Bradford	1955
Labour	Thomas Walker*	Oxford	1955
Conservative	C. A. Wood*	Crumpsall	1955
Conservative	Samuel Woollam*	Chorlton-cum-Hardy	1955

=== Aldermanic election, 2 November 1949 ===
Caused by the death on 6 October 1949 of Alderman Mary Gibbons (Liberal, elected as an alderman by the council on 7 March 1945).

In his place, Councillor Prof. Frank Edward Tylecote (Conservative, St. John's, elected 19 May 1931) was elected as an alderman by the council on 2 November 1949.

Party	Alderman	Ward	Term expires
Conservative	Prof. Frank Edward Tylecote	St. Clement's	1955

=== Aldermanic elections, 7 December 1949 ===
Caused by the death on 3 November 1949 of Alderman Robert Griffith Edwards (Liberal, elected as an alderman by the council on 4 December 1940).

In his place, Councillor Hugh Lee (Liberal, Blackley, elected 2 November 1931; previously 1919-21) was elected as an alderman by the council on 7 December 1949.

Party	Alderman	Ward	Term expires
Liberal	Hugh Lee	St. Luke's	1952

Caused by the death on 21 November 1949 of Alderman Andrew Cathcart (Labour, elected as an alderman by the council on 5 June 1946).

In his place, Councillor Douglas Gosling (Conservative, Moss Side West, elected 19 January 1932) was elected as an alderman by the council on 7 December 1949.

Party	Alderman	Ward	Term expires
Conservative	Douglas Gosling	Medlock Street	1955

== By-elections between 1949 and 1950 ==
=== St. John's, 28 June 1949 ===
Caused by the election as an alderman of Councillor James Edward Burgess (Conservative, St. John's, elected 30 May 1930) on 25 May 1949, following the defeat on 25 May 1949 of Alderman Leslie Lever (Labour, elected as an alderman by the council on 2 March 1949).

St. John's
Party	Candidate	Votes	%	±%
Conservative	J. McGrath	631	67.8	N/A
Labour	P. Roddy	299	32.2	N/A
Majority		332	35.6	N/A
Turnout		930		
Conservative hold		Swing		

=== Exchange, 7 September 1949 ===
Caused by the death of Councillor Thomas Higson (Conservative, Exchange, elected 28 February 1933) on 3 August 1949.

Exchange
Party	Candidate	Votes	%	±%
Conservative	T. C. Hewlett	uncontested		
Conservative hold		Swing		

=== Chorlton-cum-Hardy, 24 November 1949 ===
Caused by the resignation of Councillor Richard Turley (Conservative, Chorlton-cum-Hardy, elected 9 November 1939) on 2 November 1949.

Chorlton-cum-Hardy
Party	Candidate	Votes	%	±%
Conservative	A. Wood	8,606	68.8	−6.2
Labour	W. M. Parkinson	2,516	20.1	−4.9
Liberal	J. T. Chapman	1,386	11.1	N/A
Majority		6,090	48.7	−1.3
Turnout		12,508		
Conservative hold		Swing		

=== Miles Platting, 15 December 1949 ===
Caused by the death of Councillor E. J. Howarth (Labour, Miles Platting, elected 1 November 1935) on 19 October 1949.

Miles Platting
Party	Candidate	Votes	%	±%
Labour	L. M. Lever	2,783	61.6	+3.0
Conservative	F. E. Doran	1,732	38.4	−3.0
Majority		1,051	23.2	+6.0
Turnout		4,515		
Labour hold		Swing		
