= 1908 Manchester City Council election =

Local election in Manchester

- 2 November 1908

31 of 124 seats to Manchester City Council 63 seats needed for a majority
	First party	Second party	Third party
Party	Conservative	Liberal	Labour
Last election	17 seats, 46.2%	8 seats, 21.8%	2 seats, 21.9%
Seats before	60	47	11
Seats won	18	8	2
Seats after	65	43	8
Seat change	▲5	▼4	▼3
Popular vote	25,506	14,273	15,963
Percentage	39.5%	22.1%	24.7%
Swing	▼6.7%	▲0.3%	▲2.8%
	Fourth party
Party	Independent
Last election	4 seats, 10.1%
Seats before	6
Seats won	3
Seats after	8
Seat change	▲2
Popular vote	8,829
Percentage	13.7%
Swing	▲3.6%
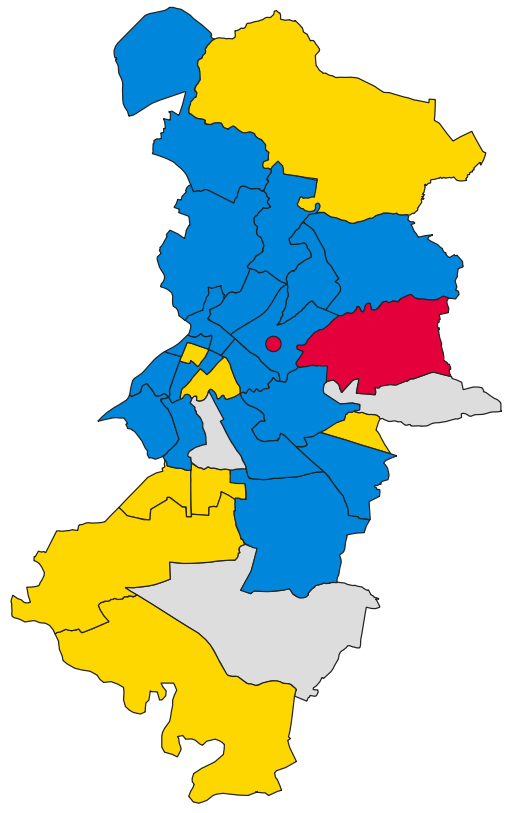
- Map of results of 1908 election
Leader of the Council before election
No overall control
Leader of the Council after election
Conservative

Elections to Manchester City Council were held on Monday, 2 November 1908. One third of the councillors seats were up for election, with each successful candidate to serve a three-year term of office. The Conservative Party gained overall control of the council from no overall control.

== Election result ==
Party	Votes		Seats			Full Council	
Conservative Party	25,506 (39.5%)	▼6.7	18 (58.1%)	18 / 31	▲5	65 (52.4%)	65 / 124
Liberal Party	14,274 (22.1%)	▲0.3	8 (25.8%)	8 / 31	▼4	43 (34.7%)	43 / 124
Labour Party	15,963 (24.7%)	▲2.8	2 (6.5%)	2 / 31	▼3	8 (6.5%)	8 / 124
Independent	8,829 (13.7%)	▲3.6	4 (9.7%)	4 / 31	▲2	8 (6.5%)	8 / 124

=== Full council ===
↓
8	43	8	65

=== Aldermen ===
↓
20	11

=== Councillors ===
↓
8	23	8	54

== Ward results ==
=== All Saints' ===
All Saints'
Party	Candidate	Votes	%	±%
Independent	E. Pierce	1,088	56.1	−3.0
Liberal	W. B. Pritchard*	851	43.9	N/A
Majority		237	12.2	−6.0
Turnout		1,939		
Independent gain from Liberal		Swing		

=== Ardwick ===
Ardwick
Party	Candidate	Votes	%	±%
Conservative	J. Stewart*	2,055	51.5	−5.4
Labour	T. Lowth	1,935	48.5	+7.7
Majority		120	3.0	−13.1
Turnout		3,990		
Conservative hold		Swing		

=== Blackley and Moston ===
Blackley and Moston
Party	Candidate	Votes	%	±%
Liberal	G. Bennett*	1,686	38.0	N/A
Conservative	J. R. Coutts	1,406	31.6	N/A
Labour	W. Phillips	1,353	30.4	N/A
Majority		280	6.4	N/A
Turnout		4,445		
Liberal hold		Swing		

=== Bradford ===
Bradford
Party	Candidate	Votes	%	±%
Labour	J. Billam*	3,080	53.0	N/A
Independent	G. B. Hertz	2,733	47.0	N/A
Majority		347	6.0	N/A
Turnout		5,813		
Labour hold		Swing		

=== Cheetham ===
Cheetham
Party	Candidate	Votes	%	±%
Conservative	H. E. Howell*	1,719	52.7	N/A
Liberal	J. J. Kendall	1,441	44.2	N/A
Labour	M. Barritz	100	3.1	N/A
Majority		278	8.5	N/A
Turnout		3,260		
Conservative hold		Swing		

=== Chorlton-cum-Hardy ===
Chorlton-cum-Hardy
Party	Candidate	Votes	%	±%
Liberal	H. Kemp*	uncontested		
Liberal hold		Swing		

=== Collegiate Church ===
Collegiate Church
Party	Candidate	Votes	%	±%
Conservative	J. Lowry*	uncontested		
Conservative hold		Swing		

=== Crumpsall ===
Crumpsall
Party	Candidate	Votes	%	±%
Conservative	F. J. Robertshaw*	uncontested		
Conservative hold		Swing		

=== Didsbury ===
Didsbury
Party	Candidate	Votes	%	±%
Liberal	J. Swarbrick	715	54.4	N/A
Conservative	C. S. Edwards	599	45.6	N/A
Majority		116	8.8	N/A
Turnout		1,314		
Liberal hold		Swing		

=== Exchange ===
Exchange
Party	Candidate	Votes	%	±%
Conservative	T. Smethurst*	385	51.1	N/A
Liberal	P. Earley	369	48.9	+2.2
Majority		16	2.2	
Turnout		754		
Conservative hold		Swing		

=== Harpurhey ===
Harpurhey
Party	Candidate	Votes	%	±%
Conservative	W. Holden*	2,844	54.8	+18.4
Labour	J. Fogarty	2,343	45.2	+0.6
Majority		501	9.6	
Turnout		5,187		
Conservative hold		Swing		

=== Longsight ===
Longsight
Party	Candidate	Votes	%	±%
Conservative	A. Jennison	1,260	48.9	+16.1
Liberal	O. Heggs*	790	30.6	−13.2
Labour	A. E. Wachter	528	20.5	−2.9
Majority		470	18.3	
Turnout		2,578		
Conservative gain from Liberal		Swing		

=== Medlock Street ===
Medlock Street
Party	Candidate	Votes	%	±%
Conservative	S. Woollam	1,254	46.6	N/A
Independent	J. D. Pennington*	761	28.3	N/A
Labour	J. D. Jubb	675	25.1	N/A
Majority		493	18.3	N/A
Turnout		2,690		
Conservative gain from Independent		Swing		

=== Miles Platting ===
Miles Platting
Party	Candidate	Votes	%	±%
Conservative	J. Hamnett	1,433	56.8	N/A
Labour	J. E. Gilchrist*	1,091	43.2	N/A
Majority		342	13.6	N/A
Turnout		2,524		
Conservative gain from Labour		Swing		

=== Moss Side East ===
Moss Side East
Party	Candidate	Votes	%	±%
Liberal	J. Bowie*	1,025	54.8	+1.4
Conservative	W. E. Harvey	845	45.2	N/A
Majority		180	9.6	+2.8
Turnout		1,870		
Liberal hold		Swing		

=== Moss Side West ===
Moss Side West
Party	Candidate	Votes	%	±%
Liberal	W. Rowlands	963	50.6	N/A
Conservative	J. W. J. Cremlyn	941	49.4	N/A
Majority		22	1.2	N/A
Turnout		1,904		
Liberal hold		Swing		

=== New Cross ===
New Cross
Party	Candidate	Votes	%	±%
Conservative	N. Meadowcroft*	2,341	63.6	−2.1
Labour	T. R. Marr*	1,374	37.4	+8.9
Independent	J. Sheldon	1,298	35.3	N/A
Majority		76	2.1	
Turnout		3,677		
Conservative hold		Swing		
Labour hold		Swing		

=== Newton Heath ===
Newton Heath
Party	Candidate	Votes	%	±%
Conservative	J. A. Moston	1,598	61.1	−2.8
Labour	R. Robinson	1,018	38.9	+2.8
Majority		580	22.2	−5.6
Turnout		2,616		
Conservative gain from Labour		Swing		

=== Openshaw ===
Openshaw
Party	Candidate	Votes	%	±%
Independent	F. S. Fletcher	2,189	55.1	+1.1
Labour	E. J. Hart*	1,787	44.9	−1.1
Majority		402	10.2	+2.2
Turnout		3,976		
Independent gain from Labour		Swing		

=== Oxford ===
Oxford
Party	Candidate	Votes	%	±%
Liberal	A. Burgon*	416	60.5	N/A
Conservative	A. R. Besso	272	39.5	N/A
Majority		144	21.0	N/A
Turnout		688		
Liberal hold		Swing		

=== Rusholme ===
Rusholme
Party	Candidate	Votes	%	±%
Conservative	W. F. Lane-Scott*	uncontested		
Conservative hold		Swing		

=== St. Ann's ===
St. Ann's
Party	Candidate	Votes	%	±%
Liberal	A. Porter	587	50.1	+7.3
Conservative	G. King	585	49.9	+3.9
Majority		2	0.2	−3.0
Turnout		1,172		
Liberal hold		Swing		

=== St. Clement's ===
St. Clement's
Party	Candidate	Votes	%	±%
Conservative	J. B. Langley	417	53.2	N/A
Liberal	G. F. Burditt*	367	46.8	N/A
Majority		50	6.4	N/A
Turnout		784		
Conservative gain from Liberal		Swing		

=== St. George's ===
St. George's
Party	Candidate	Votes	%	±%
Conservative	A. Craven*	1,640	52.2	−22.1
Liberal	G. Oddy	1,504	47.8	+22.1
Majority		136	4.4	−44.2
Turnout		3,144		
Conservative hold		Swing		

=== St. James' ===
St. James'
Party	Candidate	Votes	%	±%
Conservative	S. W. Royse*	364	59.6	−2.5
Liberal	C. W. Naismith	247	40.4	+2.5
Majority		117	19.2	−5.0
Turnout		611		
Conservative hold		Swing		

=== St. John's ===
St. John's
Party	Candidate	Votes	%	±%
Conservative	T. Watmough*	uncontested		
Conservative hold		Swing		

=== St. Luke's ===
St. Luke's
Party	Candidate	Votes	%	±%
Conservative	T. H. Hinchcliffe	1,545	52.8	N/A
Liberal	H. Marsden*	1,381	47.2	N/A
Majority		164	5.6	N/A
Turnout		2,926		
Conservative gain from Liberal		Swing		

=== St. Mark's ===
St. Mark's
Party	Candidate	Votes	%	±%
Liberal	J. Allison*	915	57.4	N/A
Labour	G. Hall	679	42.6	+8.3
Majority		236	14.8	
Turnout		1,594		
Liberal hold		Swing		

=== St. Michael's ===
St. Michael's
Party	Candidate	Votes	%	±%
Conservative	C. C. Singleton	1,337	56.8	+2.4
Liberal	W. May	1,017	43.2	−2.4
Majority		320	13.6	+4.8
Turnout		2,354		
Conservative hold		Swing		

=== Withington ===
Withington
Party	Candidate	Votes	%	±%
Independent	M. Ashton	760	53.3	N/A
Conservative	R. R. Shaw	666	46.7	−6.4
Majority		94	6.6	
Turnout		1,426		
Independent gain from Conservative		Swing		

== Aldermanic elections ==
=== Aldermanic election, 9 November 1908 ===
Caused by the resignation on 28 October 1908 of Alderman James Rushworth (Liberal, elected as an alderman by the council on 9 November 1892).

In his place, Councillor Daniel Boyle (Liberal, New Cross, elected 1 November 1894) was elected as an alderman by the council on 9 November 1908.

Party	Alderman	Ward	Term expires
Liberal	Daniel Boyle	St. Luke's	1910

=== Aldermanic election, 20 January 1909 ===
Caused by the death on 9 January 1909 of Alderman Sir James Wilson Southern (Liberal, elected as an alderman by the council on 6 January 1897).

In his place, Councillor Samuel Dixon (Conservative, Miles Platting, elected 1 November 1894) was elected as an alderman by the council on 20 January 1909.

Party	Alderman	Ward	Term expires
Conservative	Samuel Dixon	Ardwick	1913

=== Aldermanic election, 6 October 1909 ===
Caused by the death on 26 September 1909 of Alderman Joseph Thompson (Liberal, elected as an alderman by the council on 16 July 1879).

In his place, Councillor Thomas Hassall (Conservative, St. Clement's, elected 1 November 1895) was elected as an alderman by the council on 6 October 1909.

Party	Alderman	Ward	Term expires
Conservative	Thomas Hassall		1913

== By-elections between 1908 and 1909 ==
=== New Cross, 24 November 1908 ===
Caused by the election as an alderman of Councillor Daniel Boyle (Liberal, New Cross, elected 1 November 1894) on 9 November 1908 following the resignation on 28 October 1908 of Alderman James Rushworth (Liberal, elected as an alderman by the council on 9 November 1892).

New Cross
Party	Candidate	Votes	%	±%
Conservative	J. W. J. Cremlyn	2,059	59.8	−3.8
Liberal	J. Masterson	1,162	33.8	N/A
Independent	G. Mason	220	6.4	N/A
Majority		897	26.0	
Turnout		3,441		
Conservative gain from Liberal		Swing		

=== Cheetham, 27 November 1908 ===
Caused by the death of Councillor John Williams (Conservative, Cheetham, elected 1 November 1901) on 10 November 1908.

Cheetham
Party	Candidate	Votes	%	±%
Liberal	J. J. Kendall	1,774	56.8	+12.6
Conservative	R. E. Boardman	1,351	43.2	−9.5
Majority		423	13.6	
Turnout		3,125		
Liberal gain from Conservative		Swing		

=== Miles Platting, 3 February 1909 ===
Caused by the election as an alderman of Councillor Samuel Dixon (Conservative, Miles Platting, elected 1 November 1894) on 20 January 1909 following the death on 9 January 1909 of Alderman Sir James Wilson Southern (Liberal, elected as an alderman by the council on 6 January 1897).

Miles Platting
Party	Candidate	Votes	%	±%
Conservative	R. Chesters	981	44.7	−12.1
Labour	J. E. Gilchrist	859	39.1	−4.1
Liberal	C. Thorpe	357	16.2	N/A
Majority		122	5.6	−8.0
Turnout		2,197		
Conservative hold		Swing		

=== St. Clement's, 11 October 1909 ===
Caused by the election as an alderman of Councillor Thomas Hassall (Conservative, St. Clement's, elected 1 November 1895) on 6 October 1909 following the death on 26 September 1909 of Alderman Joseph Thompson (Liberal, elected as an alderman by the council on 16 July 1879).

St. Clement's
Party	Candidate	Votes	%	±%
Conservative	G. B. Kershaw	uncontested		
Conservative hold		Swing		
