= Edmund Dell =

British politician and businessman

The Right Honourable Edmund Dell
- Dell in 1969 by Godfrey Argent

Secretary of State for Trade
- In office 8 April 1976 – 11 November 1978
- Prime Minister: James Callaghan
- Preceded by: Peter Shore
- Succeeded by: John Smith

Member of Parliament for Birkenhead
- In office 15 October 1964 – 7 April 1979
- Preceded by: Percy Collick
- Succeeded by: Frank Field

Personal details
- Born: 15 August 1921 London, England
- Died: 31 October 1999 (aged 78) London, England
- Party: Liberal Democrats (after 1988)
- Other political affiliations: Labour (until 1981); SDP (1981–1988)
- Spouse: Susanne Gottschalk (m. 1963)
- Education: Queen's College, Oxford

Edmund Emanuel Dell (15 August 1921 – c. 31 October 1999 (Note: Sources disagree on Dell's date of death. His entry in the Oxford Dictionary of National Biography, which cites his death certificate, says he died on 31 October 1999. A death date of 28 October 1999 is given by The Guardian and on Parliament's website. His obituaries in The Times and The Independent give a date of 1 November 1999.)) was a British politician and businessman. He was a Labour MP and minister in the 1960s and 1970s, but after leaving parliament, joined the Social Democratic Party and its eventual successor, the Liberal Democrats.

== Early life ==
Dell was born in Hackney, London, in 1921, the son of a Jewish manufacturer. In the Second World War he served in the Royal Artillery, reaching the rank of lieutenant. He was educated at Dame Alice Owen's School and Queen's College, Oxford where he was a member of the Communist Party, as his future ministerial colleague Denis Healey had been before the war. He graduated with first class honours in Modern History in 1947.

== Early career and politics ==
Dell began work for Imperial Chemical Industries (ICI) in Manchester as an overseas sales manager, specialising in Latin American trade and eventually rose to Vice President of the Plastics Division. However, he began to find himself in the difficult position of balancing a career in business with Labour politics. He was elected to Manchester City Council in 1953, and served for seven years.

== Political career ==
=== Labour party ===
Dell stood unsuccessfully for Parliament in 1955 in Middleton and Prestwich. He was dissuaded from standing for Parliament in 1959 by ICI, on the grounds that it would make promotion to the highest ranks of the company difficult. However, he eventually gave in to the temptation of national politics, and was elected to Parliament as the Labour Member of Parliament for Birkenhead in 1964. He served as Parliamentary private secretary to Jack Diamond, then as Parliamentary Under-Secretary of State at the Ministry of Technology under Tony Benn in 1966 and the Department of Economic Affairs under Peter Shore in 1967. The following year, he was promoted to Minister of State for Trade. Switched to the Department of Employment in 1969, he was made a Privy Councillor in 1970.

Dell was one of the 69 rebel Labour MPs who sided with the Conservative government and voted for Britain's entry into the European Communities in 1971. He subsequently refused to take a frontbench role while in opposition and served as Chairman of the Public Accounts Committee. When Harold Wilson returned to 10 Downing Street as prime minister in 1974, Dell became Paymaster General, then Secretary of State for Trade and President of the Board of Trade between 1976 and 1978 in James Callaghan's government. He was tipped to become Chancellor of the Exchequer but resigned his seat, increasingly disillusioned by Labour's drift to the Left as he moved sharply to the Right. He had always been much more oriented toward free-market capitalism than his comrades in the Labour Party, and grew increasingly uncomfortable in a party that was growing increasingly dominated by advocates of a planned economy and corporatism.

=== SDP and Liberal Democrats ===
Dell joined the new Social Democratic Party and, following its merger with the Liberal Party in 1988, he was a member of the Liberal Democrats. He served as a trustee of both the SDP and the Liberal Democrats and served as one of SDP's three representatives during emergency negotiations with the Liberals in January 1988 when it appeared the two parties' merger might fall through after the failed launch by David Steel and Bob Maclennan of the joint manifesto, Voices and Choices.

== Post-Parliament life ==
After Parliament, Dell had a career in business as chairman of Guinness Peat, founding chairman of Channel 4 and as a director of Shell Trading. In 1991-2 he was president of the London Chamber of Commerce and Industry. In 1996, he wrote The Chancellors: A History of Chancellors of the Exchequer 1945–90. His book, A Strange Eventful History, Democratic Socialism in Britain was published posthumously in 2000. It was a summation of his critique of the Labour Party's long history being attached to what he saw as "much Keynesianism and too much of the detritus of socialism." Although he had voted for Labour in 1992 and 1997, he still thought that New Labour ultimately "will not fully have entered the modern world until it learns to love capitalism with all its warts." He was especially angry with both parties in 1950–51 for refusing to join the European Community at an early stage when it could have a powerful voice. He said it represented, "the British abdication of leadership in Europe."

== Personal life and death ==
In 1963, Dell married Susanne Gottschalk. The couple lived in Hampstead Garden Suburb.

Dell died from cancer at a hospice facility in Finchley in 1999, at the age of 78.

== Notes ==
Parliament of the United Kingdom
Preceded by Percy Collick	Member of Parliament for Birkenhead; 1964–1979	Succeeded by Frank Field
Political offices
Preceded by Maurice Macmillan	Paymaster General; 1974–1976	Succeeded by Shirley Williams
Preceded by Peter Shore	Secretary of State for Trade; 1976–1978	Succeeded by John Smith
Media offices
New office	Chairman of Channel 4; 1982–1987	Succeeded by Richard Attenborough
