= Jack Eccles (trade unionist) =

British trade unionist

Jack Fleming Eccles CBE (9 February 1922 – January 2010) was a British trade unionist.

Eccles was born in Heaton Moor and grew up in Chorlton, then studied at the University of Manchester. During World War II, he served with the 14th Army in Burma. In 1948, he took employment as an organiser with the National Union of General and Municipal Workers. His family had a long history in the union, with his grandfather Fleming Eccles and father Tom Eccles both having played leading roles. Eccles also served as a Labour Party member of Manchester City Council. In 1966, he became the Lancashire regional secretary of the union.

In 1973, Eccles joined the council of the Trades Union Congress, and in the 1980 Birthday Honours, he was awarded the CBE. He served as President of the TUC in 1985, during which time he opposed the UK miners strike. He retired the following year.

Trade union offices
Preceded by Ray Buckton	President of the Trades Union Congress; 1985	Succeeded by Ken Gill
