= 1914 Manchester City Council election =

Local election in Manchester

- 2 November 1914

35 of 140 seats on Manchester City Council 71 seats needed for a majority
	First party	Second party	Third party
Party	Conservative	Liberal	Labour
Last election	17 seats, 44.2%	11 seats, 29.2%	6 seats, 19.1%
Seats before	75	42	15
Seats won	15	11	6
Seats after	75	42	15
Seat change	Steady	Steady	Steady
	Fourth party
Party	Independent
Last election	1 seats, 6.0%
Seats before	8
Seats won	3
Seats after	8
Seat change	Steady
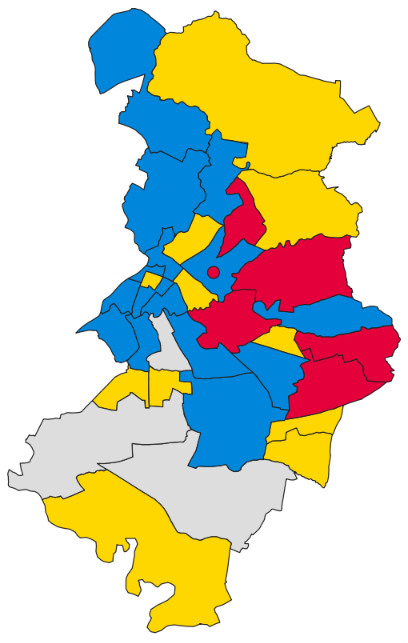
- Map of results of 1914 election
Leader of the Council before election
Conservative
Leader of the Council after election
Conservative

Elections to Manchester City Council were scheduled to be held on Monday, 2 November 1914. One third of the councillors seats were up for election, with each successful candidate to serve a three-year term of office.

However, due to the outbreak of the First World War none of the seats were contested.

Annual local elections were suspended from 1915 to 1919. Under the Elections and Registration Act 1915 the term of office of all members of the council was extended by one year and casual vacancies among members of the council were filled by the choice of the council rather than by election. Subsequent Parliament and Local Elections Acts of 1916, 1917, and 1918 each further extended the term of office of all members of the council by a year.

The Conservative Party retained overall control of the council.

== Election result ==
Party	Seats			Full Council	
Conservative Party	15 (42.9%)	15 / 35	Steady	75 (53.6%)	75 / 140
Liberal Party	11 (31.4%)	11 / 35	Steady	42 (30.0%)	42 / 140
Labour Party	6 (17.1%)	6 / 35	Steady	15 (10.7%)	15 / 140
Independent	3 (8.6%)	3 / 35	Steady	8 (5.7%)	8 / 140

=== Full council ===
↓
15	42	8	75

=== Aldermen ===
↓
16	1	18

=== Councillors ===
↓
15	26	7	57

== Ward results ==
=== All Saints' ===
All Saints'
Party	Candidate	Votes	%	±%
Independent	E. Pierce*	uncontested		
Independent hold		Swing		

=== Ardwick ===
Ardwick
Party	Candidate	Votes	%	±%
Labour	J. M. McLachlan*	uncontested		
Labour hold		Swing		

=== Blackley and Moston ===
Blackley and Moston
Party	Candidate	Votes	%	±%
Liberal	T. S. Williams*	uncontested		
Liberal hold		Swing		

=== Bradford ===
Bradford
Party	Candidate	Votes	%	±%
Labour	J. Billam*	uncontested		
Labour hold		Swing		

=== Cheetham ===
Cheetham
Party	Candidate	Votes	%	±%
Conservative	A. Whitworth*	uncontested		
Conservative hold		Swing		

=== Chorlton-cum-Hardy ===
Chorlton-cum-Hardy
Party	Candidate	Votes	%	±%
Independent	J. Redford*	uncontested		
Independent hold		Swing		

=== Collegiate Church ===
Collegiate Church
Party	Candidate	Votes	%	±%
Conservative	T. R. Hewlett*	uncontested		
Conservative hold		Swing		

=== Crumpsall ===
Crumpsall
Party	Candidate	Votes	%	±%
Conservative	F. J. Robertshaw*	uncontested		
Conservative hold		Swing		

=== Didsbury ===
Didsbury
Party	Candidate	Votes	%	±%
Liberal	J. Swarbrick*	uncontested		
Liberal hold		Swing		

=== Exchange ===
Exchange
Party	Candidate	Votes	%	±%
Conservative	G. Westcott*	uncontested		
Conservative hold		Swing		

=== Gorton North ===
Gorton North
Party	Candidate	Votes	%	±%
Labour	J. P. Greenall*	uncontested		
Labour hold		Swing		

=== Gorton South ===
Gorton South
Party	Candidate	Votes	%	±%
Labour	S. Hague*	uncontested		
Labour hold		Swing		

=== Harpurhey ===
Harpurhey
Party	Candidate	Votes	%	±%
Conservative	W. Holden*	uncontested		
Conservative hold		Swing		

=== Levenshulme North ===
Levenshulme North
Party	Candidate	Votes	%	±%
Liberal	R. S. Harper*	uncontested		
Liberal hold		Swing		

=== Levenshulme South ===
Levenshulme South
Party	Candidate	Votes	%	±%
Liberal	M. E. Mitchell*	uncontested		
Liberal hold		Swing		

=== Longsight ===
Longsight
Party	Candidate	Votes	%	±%
Conservative	A. Jennison*	uncontested		
Conservative hold		Swing		

=== Medlock Street ===
Medlock Street
Party	Candidate	Votes	%	±%
Conservative	S. Woollam*	uncontested		
Conservative hold		Swing		

=== Miles Platting ===
Miles Platting
Party	Candidate	Votes	%	±%
Labour	J. Fogarty*	uncontested		
Labour hold		Swing		

=== Moss Side East ===
Moss Side East
Party	Candidate	Votes	%	±%
Liberal	J. Bowie*	uncontested		
Liberal hold		Swing		

=== Moss Side West ===
Moss Side West
Party	Candidate	Votes	%	±%
Liberal	W. Rowlands*	uncontested		
Liberal hold		Swing		

=== New Cross ===
New Cross
Party	Candidate	Votes	%	±%
Conservative	N. Meadowcroft*	uncontested		
Labour	T. R. Marr*	uncontested		
Conservative hold		Swing		
Labour hold		Swing		

=== Newton Heath ===
Newton Heath
Party	Candidate	Votes	%	±%
Liberal	C. W. Godbert*	uncontested		
Liberal hold		Swing		

=== Openshaw ===
Openshaw
Party	Candidate	Votes	%	±%
Conservative	H. D. Judson*	uncontested		
Conservative hold		Swing		

=== Oxford ===
Oxford
Party	Candidate	Votes	%	±%
Conservative	W. B. Midgley*	uncontested		
Conservative hold		Swing		

=== Rusholme ===
Rusholme
Party	Candidate	Votes	%	±%
Conservative	W. F. Lane-Scott*	uncontested		
Conservative hold		Swing		

=== St. Ann's ===
St. Ann's
Party	Candidate	Votes	%	±%
Liberal	A. Porter*	uncontested		
Liberal hold		Swing		

=== St. Clement's ===
St. Clement's
Party	Candidate	Votes	%	±%
Liberal	W. Melland*	uncontested		
Liberal hold		Swing		

=== St. George's ===
St. George's
Party	Candidate	Votes	%	±%
Conservative	J. H. Swales*	uncontested		
Conservative hold		Swing		

=== St. James' ===
St. James'
Party	Candidate	Votes	%	±%
Conservative	S. W. Royse*	uncontested		
Conservative hold		Swing		

=== St. John's ===
St. John's
Party	Candidate	Votes	%	±%
Conservative	J. Bayliss*	uncontested		
Conservative hold		Swing		

=== St. Luke's ===
St. Luke's
Party	Candidate	Votes	%	±%
Conservative	T. H. Hinchcliffe*	uncontested		
Conservative hold		Swing		

=== St. Mark's ===
St. Mark's
Party	Candidate	Votes	%	±%
Liberal	J. Allison*	uncontested		
Liberal hold		Swing		

=== St. Michael's ===
St. Michael's
Party	Candidate	Votes	%	±%
Liberal	C. Egan*	uncontested		
Liberal hold		Swing		

=== Withington ===
Withington
Party	Candidate	Votes	%	±%
Independent	M. Ashton*	uncontested		
Independent hold		Swing		

== Aldermanic elections ==
=== Aldermanic election, 3 March 1915 ===
Caused by the death on 1 February 1915 of Alderman John Royle (Liberal, elected as an alderman by the council on 8 April 1908).

In his place, Councillor William Kay (Conservative, St. George's, elected 1 November 1901) was elected as an alderman by the council on 3 March 1915.

Party	Alderman	Ward	Term expires
Conservative	William Kay	St. George's	1919

=== Aldermanic election, 4 August 1915 ===
Caused by the death on 21 July 1915 of Alderman W. H. Wainwright (Liberal, elected as an alderman by the council on 17 May 1905).

In his place, Councillor Dr. A. W. Chapman (Conservative, Medlock Street, elected 25 November 1901) was elected as an alderman by the council on 4 August 1915.

Party	Alderman	Ward	Term expires
Conservative	Dr. A. W. Chapman	Medlock Steet	1922

=== Aldermanic election, 9 February 1916 ===
Caused by the death on 24 January 1916 of the Lord Mayor, Alderman Arthur Copeland (Conservative, elected as an alderman by the council on 15 February 1899).

In his place, Councillor John Allison (Liberal, St. Mark's, elected 27 January 1902) was elected as an alderman by the council on 9 February 1916.

Party	Alderman	Ward	Term expires
Liberal	John Allison	St. James'	1922

=== Aldermanic election, 7 June 1916 ===
Caused by the death on 23 May 1916 of Alderman John Ward (Liberal, elected as an alderman by the council on 13 April 1904).

In his place, Councillor James Johnston (Labour, Blackley & Moston, elected 28 July 1902; previously 1898–1901) was elected as an alderman by the council on 7 June 1916.

Party	Alderman	Ward	Term expires
Labour	James Johnston	St. John's	1922

=== Aldermanic election, 4 October 1916 ===
Caused by the death on 23 September 1916 of Alderman John Harrop (Liberal, elected as an alderman by the council on 22 February 1911).

In his place, Councillor Nathan Meadowcroft (Conservative, New Cross, elected 1 November 1902) was elected as an alderman by the council on 4 October 1916.

Party	Alderman	Ward	Term expires
Conservative	Nathan Meadowcroft	St. Clement's	1919

=== Aldermanic election, 10 January 1917 ===
Caused by the death on 16 December 1916 of Alderman Thomas Hassall (Conservative, elected as an alderman by the council on 6 October 1909).

In his place, Councillor William Holden (Conservative, Harpurhey, elected 1 November 1902) was elected as an alderman by the council on 10 January 1917.

Party	Alderman	Ward	Term expires
Conservative	William Holden		1919

=== Aldermanic election, 7 February 1917 ===
Caused by the resignation on 7 February 1917 of Alderman Daniel Boyle (Liberal, elected as an alderman by the council on 9 November 1908).

In his place, Councillor J. Herbert Thewlis (Liberal, St. Luke's, elected 19 May 1903) was elected as an alderman by the council on 7 February 1917.

Party	Alderman	Ward	Term expires
Liberal	J. Herbert Thewlis	St. Luke's	1919

=== Aldermanic election, 20 June 1917 ===
Caused by the death on 21 May 1917 of Alderman J. Herbert Thewlis (Liberal, elected as an alderman by the council on 7 February 1917).

In his place, Councillor William Lane-Scott (Conservative, Rusholme, elected 16 June 1903) was elected as an alderman by the council on 20 June 1917.

Party	Alderman	Ward	Term expires
Conservative	William Lane-Scott	St. Luke's	1919

=== Aldermanic election, 1 August 1917 ===
Caused by the death on 9 July 1917 of Alderman William Holden (Conservative, elected as an alderman by the council on 10 January 1917).

In his place, Councillor John Makeague (Conservative, Exchange, elected 2 November 1903) was elected as an alderman by the council on 1 August 1917.

Party	Alderman	Ward	Term expires
Conservative	John Makeague		1919

=== Aldermanic election, 31 October 1917 ===
Caused by the resignation on 3 October 1917 of Alderman W. T. Rothwell (Conservative, elected as an alderman by the council on 25 October 1905).

In his place, Councillor Sir Charles Behrens (Liberal, Oxford, elected 2 November 1903) was elected as an alderman by the council on 31 October 1917.

Party	Alderman	Ward	Term expires
Liberal	Charles Behrens	Oxford	1922

=== Aldermanic election, 2 October 1918 ===
Caused by the death on 17 September 1918 of Alderman George Howarth (Liberal, elected as an alderman by the council on 21 January 1914).

In his place, Councillor William Jackson (Labour, Harpurhey, elected 2 November 1907; previously 1903-06) was elected as an alderman by the council on 2 October 1918.

Party	Alderman	Ward	Term expires
Labour	William Jackson	Blackley & Moston	1919

=== Aldermanic election, 8 January 1919 ===
Caused by the death on 7 December 1918 of Alderman John Robert Wilson (Conservative, elected as an alderman by the council on 25 October 1905).

In his place, Councillor Tom Cook (Independent Labour, Openshaw, elected 2 November 1903) was elected as an alderman by the council on 8 January 1919.

Party	Alderman	Ward	Term expires
Independent Labour	Tom Cook	Openshaw	1919

=== Aldermanic election, 16 April 1919 ===
Caused by the death on 29 March 1919 of the Lord Mayor, Alderman John Makeague (Conservative, elected as an alderman by the council on 1 August 1917).

In his place, Councillor James Kemp (Liberal, Miles Platting, elected 18 November 1903) was elected as an alderman by the council on 16 April 1919.

Party	Alderman	Ward	Term expires
Liberal	James Kemp		1919

=== Aldermanic elections, 7 May 1919 ===
Caused by the death on 14 April 1919 of Alderman John Allison (Liberal, elected as an alderman by the council on 9 February 1916).

In his place, Councillor Tom Fox (Labour, Bradford, elected 16 February 1904) was elected as an alderman by the council on 7 May 1919.

Party	Alderman	Ward	Term expires
Labour	Tom Fox	Bradford	1919

Caused by the death on 20 April 1919 of Alderman James Kemp (Liberal, elected as an alderman by the council on 16 April 1919).

In his place, Councillor Harry Derwent Simpson (Conservative, Withington, elected 1 November 1904) was elected as an alderman by the council on 7 May 1919.

Party	Alderman	Ward	Term expires
Conservative	Harry Derwent Simpson		1922

=== Aldermanic election, 15 October 1919 ===
Caused by the death on 29 September 1919 of Alderman Sir Daniel McCabe (Liberal, elected as an alderman by the council on 9 April 1902).

In his place, Councillor William Thomas Dagnall (Conservative, Moss Side East, elected 1 November 1904) was elected as an alderman by the council on 15 October 1919.

Party	Alderman	Ward	Term expires
Conservative	William Thomas Dagnall	St. Michael's	1922

== By-elections between 1914 and 1915 ==
=== St. George's, 16 March 1915 ===
Caused by the election as an alderman of Councillor William Kay (Conservative, St. George's, elected 1 November 1901) on 3 March 1915, following the death on 1 February 1915 of Alderman John Royle (Liberal, elected as an alderman by the council on 8 April 1908).

St. George's
Party	Candidate	Votes	%	±%
Conservative	L. D. Kirkpatrick	uncontested		
Conservative hold		Swing		

== Appointment of Councillors between 1915 and 1918 ==
=== Appointments, 4 August 1915 ===
==== Bradford ====
Caused by the death of Councillor Joseph Billam (Labour, Bradford, elected 2 November 1905) on 19 July 1915.

Bradford, 4 August 1915
Party	Former Councillor	Appointed Replacement	Term expires
Labour	Joseph Billam	Joseph Binns	1921

==== Medlock Street ====
Caused by the election as an alderman of Councillor Dr. A. W. Chapman (Conservative, Medlock Street, elected 25 November 1901) on 4 August 1915 following the death on 1 February 1915 of Alderman W. H. Wainwright (Liberal, elected as an alderman by the council on 17 May 1905).

Medlock Street, 4 August 1915
Party	Former Councillor	Appointed Replacement	Term expires
Conservative	Dr. A. W. Chapman	William Godfrey Lecomber	1919

=== St. Mark's, 9 February 1916 ===
Caused by the election as an alderman of Councillor John Allison (Liberal, St. Mark's, elected 27 January 1902) on 9 February 1916 following the death on 24 January 1916 of the Lord Mayor, Alderman Arthur Copeland (Conservative, elected as an alderman by the council on 15 February 1899).

St. Mark's, 9 February 1916
Party	Former Councillor	Appointed Replacement	Term expires
Liberal	John Allison	George Jennison	1921

=== Blackley & Moston, 7 June 1916 ===
Caused by the election as an alderman of Councillor James Johnston (Labour, Blackley & Moston, elected 28 July 1902; previously 1897–1901) on 7 June 1916 following the death on 23 May 1916 of Alderman John Ward (Liberal, elected as an alderman by the council on 13 May 1904).

Blackley & Moston, 7 June 1916
Party	Former Councillor	Appointed Replacement	Term expires
Labour	James Johnston	William Richard Mellor	1919

=== New Cross, 4 October 1916 ===
Caused by the election as an alderman of Councillor Nathan Meadowcroft (Conservative, New Cross, elected 1 November 1902) on 4 October 1916 following the death on 23 September 1916 of Alderman John Harrop (Liberal, elected as an alderman by the council on 22 February 1911).

New Cross, 4 October 1916
Party	Former Councillor	Appointed Replacement	Term expires
Conservative	Nathan Meadowcroft	Thomas W. H. Preston	1919

=== Harpurhey, 10 January 1917 ===
Caused by the election as an alderman of Councillor William Holden (Conservative, Harpurhey, elected 1 November 1902) on 10 January 1917 following the death on 16 December 1916 of Alderman Thomas Hassall (Conservative, elected as an alderman by the council on 6 October 1909).

Harpurhey, 10 January 1917
Party	Former Councillor	Appointed Replacement	Term expires
Conservative	William Holden	William Gilgryst	1921

=== St. Lukes's, 7 February 1917 ===
Caused by the election as an alderman of Councillor J. Herbert Thewlis (Liberal, St. Luke's, elected 19 May 1903) on 7 February 1917 following the resignation on 7 February 1917 of Alderman Daniel Boyle (Liberal, elected as an alderman by the council on 9 November 1908).

St. Luke's, 7 February 1917
Party	Former Councillor	Appointed Replacement	Term expires
Liberal	J. Herbert Thewlis	Caroline Herford	1920

=== Rusholme, 20 June 1917 ===
Caused by the election as an alderman of Councillor William Lane-Scott (Conservative, Rusholme, elected 16 June 1903) on 20 June 1917 following the death on 21 May 1917 of Alderman J. Herbert Thewlis (Liberal, elected as an alderman by the council on 7 February 1917).

Rusholme, 20 June 1917
Party	Former Councillor	Appointed Replacement	Term expires
Conservative	William Lane-Scott	John Parkinson	1921

=== Exchange, 1 August 1917 ===
Caused by the election as an alderman of Councillor John Makeague (Conservative, Exchange, elected 2 November 1903) following the death on 9 July 1917 of Alderman William Holden (Conservative, elected as an alderman by the council on 10 January 1917).

Exchange, 1 August 1917
Party	Former Councillor	Appointed Replacement	Term expires
Conservative	John Makeague	Gilbert Hardcastle	1920

=== Oxford, 31 October 1917 ===
Caused by the election as an alderman of Councillor Sir Charles Behrens (Liberal, Oxford, elected 2 November 1903) on 31 October 1917 following the resignation on 3 October 1917 of Alderman W. T. Rothwell (Conservative, elected as an alderman by the council on 25 October 1905).

Oxford, 31 October 1917
Party	Former Councillor	Appointed Replacement	Term expires
Liberal	Charles Behrens	Robert Noton Barclay	1919

=== Collegiate Church, 6 March 1918 ===
Caused by the death of Councillor Robert Taylor (Conservative, Collegiate Church, elected 1 November 1912) on 19 July 1915.

Collegiate Church, 6 March 1918
Party	Former Councillor	Appointed Replacement	Term expires
Conservative	Robert Taylor	John Elliott	1919

=== Ardwick, 4 September 1918 ===
Caused by the death in action of Councillor Dr. Kingsmill Jones (Conservative, Ardwick, elected 1 November 1913) on 2 August 1918.

Ardwick, 4 September 1918
Party	Former Councillor	Appointed Replacement	Term expires
Conservative	Dr. Kingsmill Jones	Albert Edward Burns Alexander	1920

== By-elections between 1918 and 1919 ==
=== Harpurhey, 16 October 1918 ===
Caused by the election as an alderman of Councillor William Jackson (Labour, Harpurhey, elected 2 Nov 1907; previously 1903-06) on 2 October 1918 following the death on 17 September 1918 of Alderman George Howarth (Liberal, elected as an alderman by the council on 21 January 1914).

The by-election was the first contested election of a member of Manchester City Council since the outbreak of the First World War.

Harpurhey
Party	Candidate	Votes	%	±%
NFDDSS	J. Whelan	1,068	61.0	
Labour	F. Eccles	684	39.0	
Majority		384	22.0	
Turnout		1,752		
NFDDSS gain from Labour		Swing		

=== Openshaw, 21 January 1919 ===
Caused by the election as an alderman of Councillor Tom Cook (Independent Labour, Openshaw, elected 2 November 1903) on 8 January 1919 following the death on 7 December 1918 of Alderman John Robert Wilson (Conservative, elected as an alderman by the council on 25 October 1905).

Openshaw
Party	Candidate	Votes	%	±%
Labour	J. Toole	1,428	76.0	
Conservative	C. A. Toyn	452	24.0	
Majority		976	52.0	
Turnout		1,880		
Labour gain from Independent Labour		Swing		

=== Miles Platting, 6 May 1919 ===
Caused by the election as an alderman of Councillor James Kemp (Liberal, Miles Platting, elected 18 November 1903) on 16 April 1919 following the death on 29 March 1919 of the Lord Mayor, Alderman John Makeague (Conservative, elected as an alderman by the council on 1 August 1917).

Miles Platting
Party	Candidate	Votes	%	±%
Labour	A. James	3,097	70.7	
Conservative	W. Hartley	746	17.0	
Liberal	J. Hart	540	12.3	
Majority		2,351	53.7	
Turnout		4,383		
Labour gain from Liberal		Swing		

=== By-elections, 28 May 1919 ===
Two by-elections were held on 28 May 1919 to fill vacancies that were created by the appointment of aldermen on 6 June 1928.

==== Bradford ====
Caused by the election as an alderman of Councillor Tom Fox (Labour, Bradford, elected 16 February 1904) on 7 May 1919 following the death on 14 April 1919 of Alderman John Allison (Liberal, elected as an alderman by the council on 9 February 1916).

Bradford
Party	Candidate	Votes	%	±%
Labour	E. J. Hart	2,330	56.3	
Conservative	F. Cornwall	1,809	43.7	
Majority		521	12.6	
Turnout		4,139		
Labour hold		Swing		

==== Withington ====
Caused by the election as an alderman of Councillor Harry Derwent Simpson (Conservative, Withington, elected 1 November 1904) on 7 May 1919 following the death on 20 April 1919 of Alderman James Kemp (Liberal, elected as an alderman by the council on 16 April 1919).

Withington
Party	Candidate	Votes	%	±%
Independent	L. F. Massey	1,130	55.1	
Conservative	R. R. Shaw	556	27.1	
Labour	R. C. Wallhead	364	17.8	
Majority		574	28.0	
Turnout		2,050		
Independent gain from Conservative		Swing		
