= 1911 Manchester City Council election =

Local election in Manchester

- 1 November 1911

35 of 140 seats to Manchester City Council 71 seats needed for a majority
	First party	Second party	Third party
Party	Conservative	Liberal	Labour
Last election	19 seats, 38.5%	9 seats, 25.1%	7 seats, 25.6%
Seats before	73	45	14
Seats won	15	11	6
Seats after	71	46	16
Seat change	▼2	▲1	▲2
Popular vote	30,065	15,526	17,693
Percentage	45.7%	23.6%	26.9%
Swing	▲7.2%	▼1.5%	▲1.3%
	Fourth party
Party	Independent
Last election	0 seats, 10.7%
Seats before	8
Seats won	3
Seats after	7
Seat change	▼1
Popular vote	2,304
Percentage	3.7%
Swing	▼7.0%
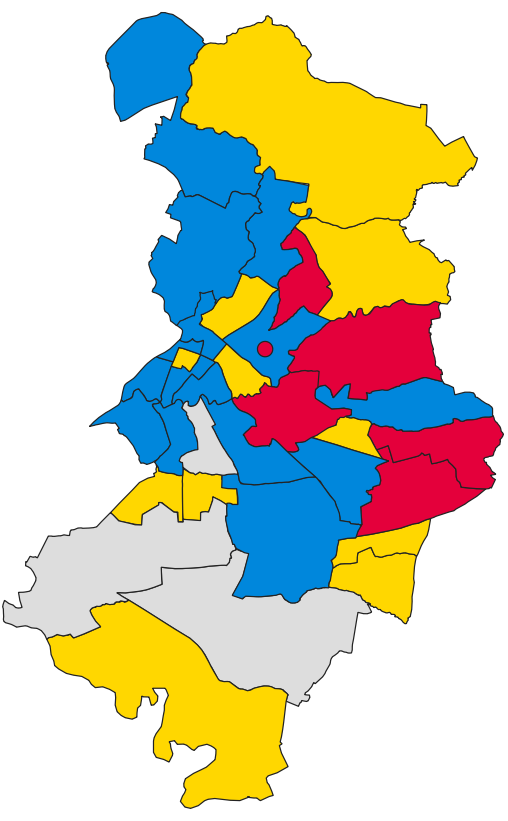
- Map of results of 1911 election
Leader of the Council before election
Conservative
Leader of the Council after election
Conservative

Elections to Manchester City Council were held on Wednesday, 1 November 1911. One third of the councillors seats were up for election, with each successful candidate to serve a three-year term of office. The Conservative Party retained overall control of the council.

== Election result ==
Party	Votes		Seats			Full Council	
Conservative Party	30,065 (45.7%)	▲7.2	15 (42.9%)	15 / 35	▼2	71 (50.7%)	71 / 140
Liberal Party	15,526 (23.6%)	▼1.5	11 (31.4%)	11 / 35	▲1	46 (32.9%)	46 / 140
Labour Party	17,693 (26.9%)	▲1.3	6 (17.1%)	6 / 35	▲2	16 (11.4%)	16 / 140
Independent	2,403 (3.7%)	▼7.0	3 (8.6%)	3 / 35	▼1	7 (5.0%)	7 / 140
British Socialist Party	148 (0.2%)	N/A	0 (0.0%)	0 / 35	N/A	0 (0.0%)	0 / 140

=== Full council ===
↓
16	46	7	71

=== Aldermen ===
↓
17	1	17

=== Councillors ===
↓
16	29	6	54

== Ward results ==
=== All Saints' ===
All Saints'
Party	Candidate	Votes	%	±%
Independent	E. Pierce*	uncontested		
Independent hold		Swing		

=== Ardwick ===
Ardwick
Party	Candidate	Votes	%	±%
Labour	J. M. McLachlan	1,974	51.4	+17.5
Conservative	A. Hailwood*	1,867	48.6	+13.5
Majority		107	2.8	
Turnout		3,841		
Labour gain from Conservative		Swing		

=== Blackley and Moston ===
Blackley and Moston
Party	Candidate	Votes	%	±%
Liberal	G. Bennett*	2,324	67.4	N/A
Labour	F. Eccles	1,126	32.6	−19.4
Majority		1,198	34.8	
Turnout		3,450		
Liberal hold		Swing		

=== Bradford ===
Bradford
Party	Candidate	Votes	%	±%
Labour	J. Billam*	3,178	57.5	+1.5
Conservative	G. W. Pendlebury	2,346	42.5	−1.5
Majority		832	15.0	+3.0
Turnout		5,524		
Labour hold		Swing		

=== Cheetham ===
Cheetham
Party	Candidate	Votes	%	±%
Conservative	A. Whitworth*	1,616	59.7	N/A
Liberal	R. Lewis	1,089	40.3	N/A
Majority		527	19.4	N/A
Turnout		2,705		
Conservative hold		Swing		

=== Chorlton-cum-Hardy ===
Chorlton-cum-Hardy
Party	Candidate	Votes	%	±%
Independent	J. Redford*	1,504	60.2	N/A
Conservative	P. Macbeth	996	39.8	N/A
Majority		508	20.4	N/A
Turnout		2,500		
Independent hold		Swing		

=== Collegiate Church ===
Collegiate Church
Party	Candidate	Votes	%	±%
Conservative	J. Lowry*	uncontested		
Conservative hold		Swing		

=== Crumpsall ===
Crumpsall
Party	Candidate	Votes	%	±%
Conservative	F. J. Robertshaw*	719	62.6	+8.8
Labour	P. L. Martin	429	37.4	N/A
Majority		290	25.2	+17.6
Turnout		1,148		
Conservative hold		Swing		

=== Didsbury ===
Didsbury
Party	Candidate	Votes	%	±%
Liberal	J. Swarbrick*	786	54.9	N/A
Conservative	P. Potter	645	45.1	N/A
Majority		141	9.8	N/A
Turnout		1,431		
Liberal hold		Swing		

=== Exchange ===
Exchange
Party	Candidate	Votes	%	±%
Conservative	G. Westcott	402	52.0	+2.7
Liberal	W. D. Batty*	371	48.0	−2.7
Majority		31	4.0	
Turnout		773		
Conservative gain from Liberal		Swing		

=== Gorton North ===
Gorton North
Party	Candidate	Votes	%	±%
Labour	J. P. Greenall*	1,317	59.2	+5.4
Conservative	R. G. Murray	906	40.8	−5.4
Majority		411	18.4	+10.8
Turnout		2,223		
Labour hold		Swing		

=== Gorton South ===
Gorton South
Party	Candidate	Votes	%	±%
Labour	S. Hague*	1,031	60.4	+4.3
Conservative	J. A. Lofts	676	39.6	N/A
Majority		355	20.8	+8.6
Turnout		1,707		
Labour hold		Swing		

=== Harpurhey ===
Harpurhey
Party	Candidate	Votes	%	±%
Conservative	W. Holden*	2,523	55.2	+7.7
Labour	R. Bebbington	2,048	44.8	−7.7
Majority		475	10.4	
Turnout		4,571		
Conservative hold		Swing		

=== Levenshulme North ===
Levenshulme North
Party	Candidate	Votes	%	±%
Liberal	R. S. Harper*	874	66.1	+25.5
Conservative	G. H. Floyd	449	33.9	−25.5
Majority		425	32.2	
Turnout		1,323		
Liberal hold		Swing		

=== Levenshulme South ===
Levenshulme South
Party	Candidate	Votes	%	±%
Liberal	M. E. Mitchell	788	52.6	+4.3
Conservative	H. M. Emery	709	47.4	−4.3
Majority		79	5.2	
Turnout		1,497		
Liberal hold		Swing		

=== Longsight ===
Longsight
Party	Candidate	Votes	%	±%
Conservative	A. Jennison*	1,299	54.3	+11.3
Labour	R. J. Davies	1,092	45.7	+25.4
Majority		207	8.6	+2.3
Turnout		2,391		
Conservative hold		Swing		

=== Medlock Street ===
Medlock Street
Party	Candidate	Votes	%	±%
Conservative	S. Woollam*	1,558	59.1	−0.1
Liberal	K. T. S. Dockray	1,080	40.9	+3.9
Majority		478	18.2	−4.0
Turnout		2,638		
Conservative hold		Swing		

=== Miles Platting ===
Miles Platting
Party	Candidate	Votes	%	±%
Labour	J. Fogarty	1,412	52.9	N/A
Conservative	J. Hamnett*	1,259	47.1	+32.5
Majority		153	5.8	
Turnout		2,671		
Labour gain from Conservative		Swing		

=== Moss Side East ===
Moss Side East
Party	Candidate	Votes	%	±%
Liberal	J. Bowie*	921	52.4	−2.2
Conservative	A. W. Hildreth	838	47.6	N/A
Majority		83	4.8	−4.4
Turnout		1,759		
Liberal hold		Swing		

=== Moss Side West ===
Moss Side West
Party	Candidate	Votes	%	±%
Liberal	W. Rowlands*	769	61.1	N/A
Conservative	W. Stanway	489	38.9	N/A
Majority		280	22.2	N/A
Turnout		1,258		
Liberal hold		Swing		

=== New Cross ===
New Cross
Party	Candidate	Votes	%	±%
Conservative	N. Meadowcroft*	1,883	63.8	−9.9
Labour	T. R. Marr*	1,599	54.2	+9.3
Conservative	T. Fishwick	1,452	49.2	−24.5
Independent	C. F. Connolly	785	26.6	N/A
Independent	G. Mason	114	3.9	N/A
Labour	W. Newby	65	2.2	−42.7
Majority		147	5.0	−3.5
Turnout		2,950		
Conservative hold		Swing		
Labour hold		Swing		

=== Newton Heath ===
Newton Heath
Party	Candidate	Votes	%	±%
Liberal	C. W. Godbert	1,417	50.9	N/A
Conservative	J. A. Moston*	1,367	49.1	N/A
Majority		50	1.8	N/A
Turnout		2,784		
Liberal gain from Conservative		Swing		

=== Openshaw ===
Openshaw
Party	Candidate	Votes	%	±%
Conservative	H. D. Judson	1,754	49.7	N/A
Labour	H. H. Laurie	1,628	46.1	−3.9
British Socialist Party	R. Whitehead	148	4.2	N/A
Majority		126	3.6	
Turnout		3,530		
Conservative gain from Independent		Swing		

=== Oxford ===
Oxford
Party	Candidate	Votes	%	±%
Conservative	W. B. Midgley	408	59.0	N/A
Liberal	A. Burgon*	284	41.0	N/A
Majority		124	18.0	N/A
Turnout		692		
Conservative gain from Liberal		Swing		

=== Rusholme ===
Rusholme
Party	Candidate	Votes	%	±%
Conservative	W. F. Lane-Scott*	uncontested		
Conservative hold		Swing		

=== St. Ann's ===
St. Ann's
Party	Candidate	Votes	%	±%
Liberal	A. Porter*	630	54.5	N/A
Conservative	J. M. Elliott	525	45.5	N/A
Majority		105	9.0	N/A
Turnout		1,155		
Liberal hold		Swing		

=== St. Clement's ===
St. Clement's
Party	Candidate	Votes	%	±%
Liberal	W. Melland	611	54.7	+0.9
Conservative	J. B. Langley*	505	45.3	−0.9
Majority		106	9.4	+1.8
Turnout		1,116		
Liberal gain from Conservative		Swing		

=== St. George's ===
St. George's
Party	Candidate	Votes	%	±%
Conservative	J. H. Swales*	uncontested		
Conservative hold		Swing		

=== St. James' ===
St. James'
Party	Candidate	Votes	%	±%
Conservative	S. W. Royse*	uncontested		
Conservative hold		Swing		

=== St. John's ===
St. John's
Party	Candidate	Votes	%	±%
Conservative	T. Watmough*	403	51.5	−12.9
Liberal	W. Robinow	380	48.5	+12.9
Majority		23	3.0	−25.8
Turnout		783		
Conservative hold		Swing		

=== St. Luke's ===
St. Luke's
Party	Candidate	Votes	%	±%
Conservative	T. H. Hinchcliffe*	1,391	54.1	N/A
Liberal	E. B. A. Jones	1,182	45.9	−6.1
Majority		209	8.2	
Turnout		2,573		
Conservative hold		Swing		

=== St. Mark's ===
St. Mark's
Party	Candidate	Votes	%	±%
Liberal	J. Allison*	816	50.7	N/A
Labour	A. Legge	794	49.3	N/A
Majority		22	1.4	N/A
Turnout		1,610		
Liberal hold		Swing		

=== St. Michael's ===
St. Michael's
Party	Candidate	Votes	%	±%
Liberal	C. Egan	1,204	52.7	+8.9
Conservative	C. J. Holland	1,080	47.3	−8.9
Majority		124	5.4	
Turnout		2,284		
Liberal gain from Conservative		Swing		

=== Withington ===
Withington
Party	Candidate	Votes	%	±%
Independent	M. Ashton*	uncontested		
Independent hold		Swing		

== Aldermanic elections ==
=== Aldermanic election, 9 November 1911 ===
Caused by the death on 25 October 1911 of Alderman Robert Gibson (Liberal, elected as an alderman by the council on 6 September 1893).

In his place, Councillor Sir Thomas Thornhill Shann (Conservative, St. James', elected 1 November 1897) was elected as an alderman by the council on 9 November 1911.

Party	Alderman	Ward	Term expires
Conservative	Sir Thomas Thornhill Shann		1913

=== Aldermanic election, 1 May 1912 ===
Caused by the death on 16 April 1912 of Alderman Sir Bosdin Leech (Liberal, elected as an alderman by the council on 2 September 1891).

In his place, Councillor John Jones (Conservative, Longsight, elected 1 November 1897) was elected as an alderman by the council on 1 May 1912.

Party	Alderman	Ward	Term expires
Conservative	John Jones	Longsight	1913

== By-elections between 1911 and 1912 ==
=== By-elections, 21 November 1911 ===
Two by-elections were held on 21 November 1911 to fill vacancies which had arisen in the city council.

==== New Cross ====
Caused by the death of Councillor Joseph Grime (Conservative, New Cross, elected 1 November 1898) on 4 November 1911.

New Cross
Party	Candidate	Votes	%	±%
Conservative	J. C. Grime	2,018	64.4	+0.6
Irish Nationalist	C. F. Connolly	1,053	33.6	N/A
Labour	A. Adshead	63	2.0	−52.2
Majority		965	30.8	
Turnout		3,134	54.1	
Conservative hold		Swing		

==== St. James' ====
Caused by the election as an alderman of Councillor Sir Thomas Thornhill Shann (Conservative, St. James', elected 1 November 1897) on 9 November 1911 following the death on 25 October 1911 of Alderman Robert Gibson (Liberal, elected as an alderman by the council on 6 September 1893).

St. James'
Party	Candidate	Votes	%	±%
Conservative	J. Hislop	365	59.0	N/A
Liberal	K. T. S. Dockray	254	41.0	N/A
Majority		111	18.0	N/A
Turnout		619	70.4	
Conservative hold		Swing		

=== Longsight, 14 May 1912 ===
Caused by the election as an alderman of Councillor John Jones (Conservative, Longsight, elected 1 November 1897) on 1 May 1912 following the death on 16 April 1912 of Alderman Sir Bosdin Leech (Liberal, elected as an alderman by the council on 2 September 1891).

Longsight
Party	Candidate	Votes	%	±%
Conservative	W. Cundiff	985	55.2	+0.9
Labour	R. J. Davies	801	44.8	−0.9
Majority		184	10.4	+1.8
Turnout		1,786		
Conservative hold		Swing		

=== Bradford, 31 July 1912 ===
Caused by the death of Councillor Thomas Lawless Morris (Liberal, Bradford, elected 8 November 1910) on 13 July 1912.

Bradford
Party	Candidate	Votes	%	±%
Conservative	G. W. Pendlebury	2,302	57.1	+14.6
Labour	W. Davies	1,732	42.9	−14.6
Majority		570	14.2	
Turnout		4,034		
Conservative gain from Liberal		Swing		
