= 1909 Manchester City Council election =

Local election in Manchester

- 1 November 1909

43 of 140 seats to Manchester City Council 71 seats needed for a majority
	First party	Second party	Third party
Party	Conservative	Liberal	Labour
Last election	18 seats, 39.5%	8 seats, 22.1%	2 seats, 24.7%
Seats before	67	41	8
Seats won	23	11	6
Seats after	74	46	10
Seat change	▲5	▲3	▲2
Popular vote	32,280	12,750	20,829
Percentage	46.3%	18.3%	29.9%
Swing	▲6.8%	▼3.8%	▲5.2%
	Fourth party
Party	Independent
Last election	3 seats, 13.7%
Seats before	8
Seats won	3
Seats after	10
Seat change	▲2
Popular vote	3,812
Percentage	5.5%
Swing	▼8.2%
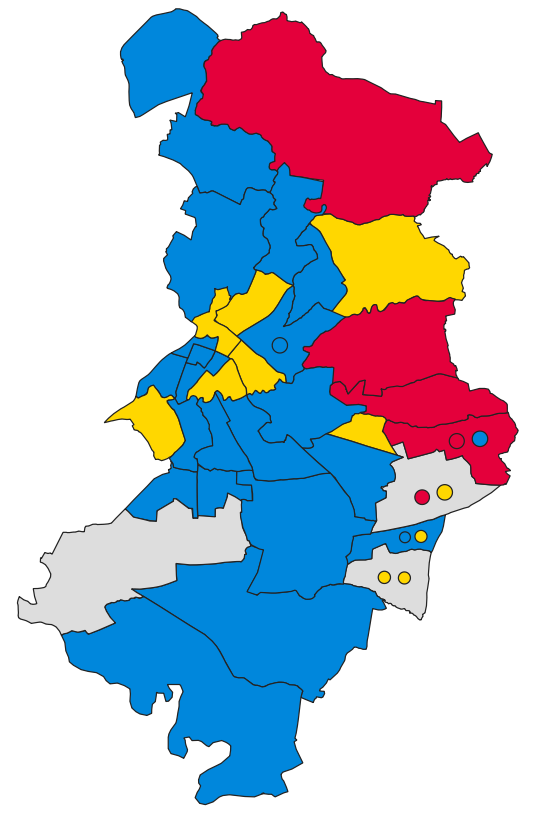
- Map of results of 1909 election
Leader of the Council before election
Conservative
Leader of the Council after election
Conservative

Elections to Manchester City Council were held on Monday, 1 November 1909. One third of the councillors seats were up for election, with each successful candidate to serve a three-year term of office. Owing to the extension of the city's boundaries, four new wards (Gorton North, Gorton South, Levenshulme North, and Levenshulme South) elected all of their councillors for the first time.

The Conservative Party retained overall control of the council.

== Election result ==
Party	Votes		Seats			Full Council	
Conservative Party	32,280 (46.3%)	▲6.8	23 (53.5%)	23 / 43	▲5	74 (52.9%)	74 / 140
Liberal Party	12,750 (18.3%)	▼3.8	11 (25.6%)	11 / 43	▲3	46 (32.9%)	46 / 140
Labour Party	20,829 (29.9%)	▲5.2	6 (14.0%)	6 / 43	▲2	10 (7.1%)	10 / 140
Independent	3,812 (5.5%)	▼8.2	3 (7.0%)	3 / 43	▲2	10 (7.1%)	10 / 140

=== Full council ===
↓
10	46	10	74

=== Aldermen ===
↓
20	15

=== Councillors ===
↓
10	26	10	59

== Ward results ==
=== All Saints' ===
All Saints'
Party	Candidate	Votes	%	±%
Conservative	C. Hornby*	768	71.0	N/A
Independent	J. E. Hutchinson	314	29.0	−27.1
Majority		454	42.0	
Turnout		1,082		
Conservative hold		Swing		

=== Ardwick ===
Ardwick
Party	Candidate	Votes	%	±%
Conservative	J. E. Chapman	2,023	50.5	−1.0
Labour	J. Doyle*	1,982	49.5	+1.0
Majority		41	1.0	−2.0
Turnout		4,005		
Conservative gain from Labour		Swing		

=== Blackley and Moston ===
Blackley and Moston
Party	Candidate	Votes	%	±%
Labour	J. Johnston*	2,083	52.4	+22.0
Conservative	J. W. J. Cremlyn	1,895	47.6	+16.0
Majority		188	4.8	
Turnout		3,978		
Labour hold		Swing		

=== Bradford ===
Bradford
Party	Candidate	Votes	%	±%
Labour	J. E. Sutton*	uncontested		
Labour hold		Swing		

=== Cheetham ===
Cheetham
Party	Candidate	Votes	%	±%
Conservative	C. A. Wood*	1,627	53.0	+0.3
Liberal	E. M. Powell	1,440	47.0	+2.8
Majority		187	6.0	−1.5
Turnout		3,067		
Conservative hold		Swing		

=== Chorlton-cum-Hardy ===
Chorlton-cum-Hardy
Party	Candidate	Votes	%	±%
Independent	E. Farrar*	uncontested		
Independent hold		Swing		

=== Collegiate Church ===
Collegiate Church
Party	Candidate	Votes	%	±%
Liberal	E. Barker	489	53.2	N/A
Conservative	C. F. Poyser*	431	46.8	N/A
Majority		58	6.4	N/A
Turnout		920		
Liberal gain from Conservative		Swing		

=== Crumpsall ===
Crumpsall
Party	Candidate	Votes	%	±%
Conservative	F. Todd*	908	70.0	N/A
Labour	J. A. McGee	390	30.0	N/A
Majority		518	40.0	N/A
Turnout		1,298		
Conservative hold		Swing		

=== Didsbury ===
Didsbury
Party	Candidate	Votes	%	±%
Conservative	W. Booth	729	58.3	+12.7
Independent	J. Redford	522	41.7	N/A
Majority		207	16.6	
Turnout		1,251		
Conservative hold		Swing		

=== Exchange ===
Exchange
Party	Candidate	Votes	%	±%
Conservative	J. Makeague*	uncontested		
Conservative hold		Swing		

=== Gorton North ===
Gorton North (3 vacancies)
Party	Candidate	Votes	%	±%
Labour	T. Higginson	1,192	53.3	
Labour	J. P. Greenall	1,133	50.7	
Conservative	J. A. Lofts	1,108	49.6	
Labour	W. Davy	1,103	49.3	
Conservative	J. Pollitt	1,098	49.1	
Liberal	M. Bushell	1,072	47.9	
Majority		5	0.3	
Turnout		2,236		
Labour win (new seat)				
Labour win (new seat)				
Conservative win (new seat)				

=== Gorton South ===
Gorton South (3 vacancies)
Party	Candidate	Votes	%	±%
Independent	T. R. Day	1,181	63.6	
Labour	S. Hague	1,012	54.5	
Liberal	G. A. Genny	964	51.9	
Labour	T. Goddard	723	38.9	
Labour	W. Gregory	619	33.3	
Majority		241	13.0	
Turnout		1,858		
Independent win (new seat)				
Labour win (new seat)				
Liberal win (new seat)				

=== Harpurhey ===
Harpurhey
Party	Candidate	Votes	%	±%
Conservative	J. Hargreaves*	2,454	50.6	−4.2
Labour	J. Fogarty	2,399	49.4	+4.2
Majority		55	1.2	−8.4
Turnout		4,853		
Conservative hold		Swing		

=== Levenshulme North ===
Levenshulme North (3 vacancies)
Party	Candidate	Votes	%	±%
Conservative	R. A. D. Carter	730	62.8	
Conservative	R. Burtles	672	57.8	
Liberal	W. B. Pritchard	503	43.3	
Liberal	R. S. Harper	488	42.0	
Labour	G. F. Titt	391	33.6	
Majority		15	1.3	
Turnout		1,162		
Conservative win (new seat)				
Conservative win (new seat)				
Liberal win (new seat)				

=== Levenshulme South ===
Levenshulme South (3 vacancies)
Party	Candidate	Votes	%	±%
Independent	J. Harrison	669	58.2	
Liberal	M. E. Mitchell	592	51.5	
Liberal	J. Siddall	587	51.0	
Conservative	F. W. W. Breakell	567	49.3	
Conservative	F. Fenn	528	45.9	
Conservative	H. M. Emery	508	44.2	
Majority		20	1.7	
Turnout		1,150		
Independent win (new seat)				
Liberal win (new seat)				
Liberal win (new seat)				

=== Longsight ===
Longsight
Party	Candidate	Votes	%	±%
Conservative	J. Jones*	1,281	51.9	+3.0
Labour	G. Hall	658	26.7	+6.2
Liberal	W. Radcliffe	529	21.4	−9.2
Majority		623	25.2	+6.9
Turnout		2,468		
Conservative hold		Swing		

=== Medlock Street ===
Medlock Street
Party	Candidate	Votes	%	±%
Conservative	A. W. Chapman*	1,476	60.8	+14.2
Labour	F. Lowe	951	39.2	+14.1
Majority		525	21.6	+3.3
Turnout		2,427		
Conservative hold		Swing		

=== Miles Platting ===
Miles Platting
Party	Candidate	Votes	%	±%
Conservative	R. Chesters*	1,388	54.3	−2.5
Labour	J. E. Gilchrist	1,168	45.7	+2.5
Majority		220	8.6	−5.0
Turnout		2,556		
Conservative hold		Swing		

=== Moss Side East ===
Moss Side East
Party	Candidate	Votes	%	±%
Conservative	W. T. Dagnall*	947	51.6	+6.4
Liberal	F. Thomas	889	48.4	−6.4
Majority		58	3.2	
Turnout		1,836		
Conservative hold		Swing		

=== Moss Side West ===
Moss Side West
Party	Candidate	Votes	%	±%
Conservative	W. Flanagan*	uncontested		
Conservative hold		Swing		

=== New Cross ===
New Cross
Party	Candidate	Votes	%	±%
Conservative	A. Taylor	2,505	71.7	+8.1
Conservative	T. Wilson	1,865	53.4	−10.2
Labour	J. T. Jones	1,427	40.8	+3.4
Labour	J. French	1,193	34.1	−3.3
Majority		438	12.6	
Turnout		3,495		
Conservative hold		Swing		
Conservative hold		Swing		

=== Newton Heath ===
Newton Heath
Party	Candidate	Votes	%	±%
Liberal	W. Butterworth*	uncontested		
Liberal hold		Swing		

=== Openshaw ===
Openshaw
Party	Candidate	Votes	%	±%
Labour	T. Cook*	1,737	55.9	+11.0
Liberal	H. Marsden	1,369	44.1	N/A
Majority		368	11.8	
Turnout		3,106		
Labour hold		Swing		

=== Oxford ===
Oxford
Party	Candidate	Votes	%	±%
Liberal	C. Behrens*	uncontested		
Liberal hold		Swing		

=== Rusholme ===
Rusholme
Party	Candidate	Votes	%	±%
Conservative	G. K. Ashton*	1,739	60.7	N/A
Independent	W. Stanway	1,126	39.3	N/A
Majority		613	21.4	N/A
Turnout		2,865		
Conservative hold		Swing		

=== St. Ann's ===
St. Ann's
Party	Candidate	Votes	%	±%
Conservative	J. G. Litton	588	50.5	+0.6
Liberal	T. C. Abbott*	576	49.5	−0.6
Majority		12	1.0	
Turnout		1,164		
Conservative gain from Liberal		Swing		

=== St. Clement's ===
St. Clement's
Party	Candidate	Votes	%	±%
Liberal	J. Harrop*	uncontested		
Liberal hold		Swing		

=== St. George's ===
St. George's
Party	Candidate	Votes	%	±%
Liberal	G. Oddy	1,678	50.1	+2.3
Conservative	J. H. Swales*	1,673	49.9	−2.3
Majority		5	0.2	
Turnout		3,351		
Liberal gain from Conservative		Swing		

=== St. James' ===
St. James'
Party	Candidate	Votes	%	±%
Conservative	T. T. Shann*	uncontested		
Conservative hold		Swing		

=== St. John's ===
St. John's
Party	Candidate	Votes	%	±%
Conservative	H. W. Billam	501	59.9	N/A
Liberal	W. Barton*	335	40.1	N/A
Majority		166	19.8	N/A
Turnout		836		
Conservative gain from Liberal		Swing		

=== St. Luke's ===
St. Luke's
Party	Candidate	Votes	%	±%
Conservative	J. Johnson*	1,868	73.7	+20.9
Labour	A. Graham	668	26.3	N/A
Majority		1,200	47.4	+41.8
Turnout		2,536		
Conservative hold		Swing		

=== St. Mark's ===
St. Mark's
Party	Candidate	Votes	%	±%
Liberal	R. Turner*	1,239	75.5	+18.1
Conservative	C. H. Penketh	403	24.5	N/A
Majority		836	51.0	+36.2
Turnout		1,642		
Liberal hold		Swing		

=== St. Michael's ===
St. Michael's
Party	Candidate	Votes	%	±%
Liberal	T. Quinn Ruddin*	uncontested		
Liberal hold		Swing		

=== Withington ===
Withington
Party	Candidate	Votes	%	±%
Conservative	H. Derwent Simpson*	uncontested		
Conservative hold		Swing		

== Aldermanic elections ==
=== Aldermanic elections, 9 November 1909 ===
Caused by the resignation on 27 October 1909 of Alderman William Norquoy (Liberal, elected as an alderman by the council on 19 November 1902).

In his place, Councillor W. B. Pritchard (Liberal, Levenshulme North, elected 1 November 1909; previously 1895–1908) was elected as an alderman by the council on 9 November 1909.

Party	Alderman	Ward	Term expires
Liberal	W. B. Pritchard	Withington	1913

Caused by the creation of Gorton North, Gorton South, Levenshulme North, and Levenshulme South wards on 1 November 1909, requiring the election of four aldermen by the council.

The following four were elected as aldermen by the council on 9 November 1909.

Party	Alderman	Ward	Term expires
Conservative	Richard Burtles	Levenshulme North	1910
Conservative	R. A. D. Carter	Levenshulme South	1913
Liberal	Fred Pogson	Gorton North	1910
Liberal	William Walker	Gorton South	1913

=== Aldermanic election, 1 December 1909 ===
Caused by the death on 17 November 1909 of Alderman Alfred Evans (Liberal, elected as an alderman by the council on 5 October 1887).

In his place, Councillor Fletcher Moss (Independent, Didsbury, elected 1 November 1904; previously 1896–1903) was elected as an alderman by the council on 1 December 1909.

Party	Alderman	Ward	Term expires
Independent	Fletcher Moss	All Saints'	1910

=== Aldermanic election, 5 January 1910 ===
Caused by the death on 9 December 1909 of Alderman Alexander McDougall (Liberal, elected as an alderman by the council on 9 November 1895).

In his place, Councillor Thomas Smethurst (Conservative, Exchange, elected 2 November 1896) was elected as an alderman by the council on 5 January 1910.

Party	Alderman	Ward	Term expires
Conservative	Thomas Smethurst	Cheetham	1913

== By-elections between 1909 and 1910 ==
=== Levenshulme North, 24 November 1909 ===
Caused by the election as an alderman of Councillor W. B. Pritchard (Liberal, Levenshulme North, elected 1 November 1909; previously 1895–1908) on 9 November 1909 following the resignation on 27 October 1909 of Alderman William Norquoy (Liberal, elected as an alderman by the council on 19 November 1902); the election as an alderman of Councillor Richard Burtles (Conservative, Levenshulme North, elected 1 November 1909) on 9 November 1909, following the creation of Levenshulme North ward on 1 November 1909, requiring the election of an alderman by the council; and the election as an alderman of Councillor R. A. D. Carter (Conservative, Levenshulme North, elected 1 November 1909) on 9 November 1909, following the creation of Levenshulme South ward on 1 November 1909, requiring the election of an alderman by the council.

Levenshulme North (3 vacancies)
Party	Candidate	Votes	%	±%
Conservative	F. Fenn	622	52.9	−9.9
Liberal	R. S. Harper	608	51.7	+8.4
Conservative	L. Dobson	560	47.6	−15.2
Liberal	E. Oldham	504	42.9	−0.4
Independent	H. J. Bentley	273	23.2	N/A
Labour	J. E. Gilchrist	167	14.2	−19.4
Labour	G. Hall	132	11.2	−22.4
Labour	T. Goddard	114	9.7	−23.9
Majority		56	4.8	
Turnout		1,176		
Conservative hold		Swing		
Liberal gain from Conservative		Swing		
Conservative gain from Liberal		Swing		

=== Didsbury, 15 December 1909 ===
Caused by the election as an alderman of Councillor Fletcher Moss (Independent, Didsbury, elected 1 November 1904; previously 1896–1903) on 1 December 1909 following the death on 17 November 1909 of Alderman Alfred Evans (Liberal, elected as an alderman by the council on 5 October 1887).

Didsbury
Party	Candidate	Votes	%	±%
Liberal	J. W. Cook	722	56.7	N/A
Conservative	C. F. Poyser	551	43.3	−15.0
Majority		171	13.4	
Turnout		1,273		
Liberal gain from Independent		Swing		

=== Exchange, 13 January 1910 ===
Caused by the election as an alderman of Councillor Thomas Smethurst (Conservative, Exchange, elected 2 November 1896) on 5 January 1910 following the death on 9 December 1909 of Alderman Alexander McDougall (Liberal, elected as an alderman by the council on 9 November 1895).

Exchange
Party	Candidate	Votes	%	±%
Liberal	W. D. Batty	uncontested		
Liberal gain from Conservative		Swing		

=== Chorlton-cum-Hardy, 8 March 1910 ===
Caused by the death of Councillor Edward Farrar (Independent, Chorlton-cum-Hardy, elected 1 November 1904) on 16 February 1910.

Chorlton-cum-Hardy
Party	Candidate	Votes	%	±%
Liberal	A. Thomson	1,001	53.0	N/A
Conservative	T. J. Bushell	887	47.0	N/A
Majority		114	6.0	N/A
Turnout		1,888		
Liberal gain from Independent		Swing		

=== Crumpsall, 12 April 1910 ===
Caused by the death of Councillor George Frederick Howard Gibson (Conservative, Crumpsall, elected 7 May 1906) on 19 March 1910.

Crumpsall
Party	Candidate	Votes	%	±%
Independent	I. Platt	587	51.4	N/A
Conservative	H. Johns	554	48.6	−21.4
Majority		33	2.8	
Turnout		1,141		
Independent gain from Conservative		Swing		

=== St. George's, 19 September 1910 ===
Caused by the resignation of Councillor Austen Craven (Conservative, St. George's, elected 1 November 1902) on 8 September 1910.

St. George's
Party	Candidate	Votes	%	±%
Conservative	J. H. Swales	1,668	54.6	+4.7
Liberal	T. Kennaugh	1,389	45.4	−4.7
Majority		279	9.2	
Turnout		3,057		
Conservative hold		Swing		
