= Thomas Kerry =

Thomas Kerry may refer to:

- Thomas William Kerry (died 1967/68), British trade unionist
- Thomas Kerry (MP) (by 1533–1607), MP for Leominster

== See also ==
- Thomas Carey (disambiguation)
