= Levenshulme North (ward) =

- Ward
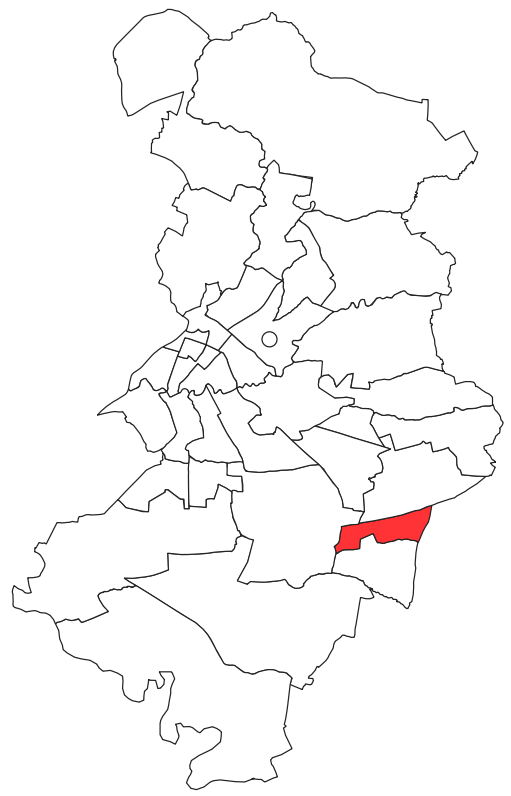
- Levenshulme North ward (1909) within Manchester

- Coat of arms
- Country: United Kingdom
- Constituent country: England
- Region: North West England
- County borough: Manchester
- Created: November 1909
- Named for: Levenshulme

Government
  - Type: Unicameral
  - Body: Manchester City Council
- UK Parliamentary Constituency: Gorton

Levenshulme North was an electoral division of Manchester City Council which was represented from 1909 until 1919. It covered part of Levenshulme in South Manchester.

== Overview ==
Levenshulme North ward was created in 1909, as a result of the Manchester Extension Scheme 1909, which transferred the urban districts of Gorton and Levenshulme to the Manchester corporation. Initially, the ward's boundaries corresponded with those of the North East and North West wards of the former Levenshulme Urban District. In 1919, the ward was abolished and merged with the Levenshulme South ward to form a single Levenshulme ward.

For the entirety of its existence, the ward formed part of the Gorton Parliamentary constituency.

== Councillors ==
Election	Councillor	Councillor	Councillor
1909	R. A. D. Carter (Con)	R. Burtles (Con)	W. B. Prichard (Lib)
November 1909	F. Fenn (Con)	R. S. Harper (Lib)	L. Dobson (Con)
1910	F. Fenn (Con)	R. S. Harper (Lib)	L. Dobson (Con)
1911	F. Fenn (Con)	R. S. Harper (Lib)	L. Dobson (Con)
1912	F. Fenn (Con)	R. S. Harper (Lib)	L. Dobson (Con)
1913	F. Fenn (Con)	R. S. Harper (Lib)	L. Dobson (Con)
1914	F. Fenn (Con)	R. S. Harper (Lib)	L. Dobson (Con)

== Elections ==
=== Elections in 1900s ===
==== November 1909 ====
1909 (3 vacancies)
Party	Candidate	Votes	%	±%
Conservative	R. A. D. Carter	730	62.8	
Conservative	R. Burtles	672	57.8	
Liberal	W. B. Pritchard	503	43.3	
Liberal	R. S. Harper	488	42.0	
Labour	G. F. Titt	391	33.6	
Majority		15	1.3	
Turnout		1,162		
Conservative win (new seat)				
Conservative win (new seat)				
Liberal win (new seat)				

==== November 1909 (by-election) ====
By-election: 24 November 1909 (3 vacancies)
Party	Candidate	Votes	%	±%
Conservative	F. Fenn	622	52.9	−9.9
Liberal	R. S. Harper	608	51.7	+8.4
Conservative	L. Dobson	560	47.6	−15.2
Liberal	E. Oldham	504	42.9	−0.4
Independent	H. J. Bentley	273	23.2	N/A
Labour	J. E. Gilchrist	167	14.2	−19.4
Labour	G. Hall	132	11.2	−22.4
Labour	T. Goddard	114	9.7	−23.9
Majority		56	4.8	
Turnout		1,176		
Conservative hold		Swing		
Liberal gain from Conservative		Swing		
Conservative gain from Liberal		Swing		

=== Elections in 1910s ===
==== November 1910 ====
1910
Party	Candidate	Votes	%	±%
Conservative	L. Dobson*	713	59.4	−3.4
Liberal	C. Peach	487	40.6	−2.7
Majority		226	18.8	
Turnout		1,200		
Conservative hold		Swing		

==== November 1911 ====
1911
Party	Candidate	Votes	%	±%
Liberal	R. S. Harper*	874	66.1	+25.5
Conservative	G. H. Floyd	449	33.9	−25.5
Majority		425	32.2	
Turnout		1,323		
Liberal hold		Swing		

==== November 1912 ====
1912
Party	Candidate	Votes	%	±%
Conservative	F. Fenn*	uncontested		
Conservative hold		Swing		

==== November 1913 ====
1913
Party	Candidate	Votes	%	±%
Conservative	L. Dobson*	uncontested		
Conservative hold		Swing		

==== November 1914 ====
1914
Party	Candidate	Votes	%	±%
Liberal	R. S. Harper*	uncontested		
Liberal hold		Swing		

== See also ==
- Manchester City Council
- Manchester City Council elections
