= 1913 Manchester City Council election =

Local election in Manchester

- 1 November 1913

35 of 140 seats to Manchester City Council 71 seats needed for a majority
| | First party | Second party | Third party |
|---|---|---|---|
| Party | Conservative | Liberal | Labour |
| Last election | 23 seats, 49.2% | 7 seats, 29.4% | 3 seats, 17.0% |
| Seats before | 78 | 39 | 16 |
| Seats won | 17 | 11 | 6 |
| Seats after | 76 | 41 | 15 |
| Seat change | ▼2 | ▲2 | ▼1 |
| Popular vote | 18,180 | 12,015 | 7,855 |
| Percentage | 44.2% | 29.2% | 19.1% |
| Swing | ▼5.0% | ▼0.2% | ▲2.1% |
| | Fourth party |
| Party | Independent |
| Last election | 3 seats, 0.9% |
| Seats before | 7 |
| Seats won | 1 |
| Seats after | 8 |
| Seat change | ▲1 |
| Popular vote | 2,457 |
| Percentage | 6.0% |
| Swing | ▲5.1% |
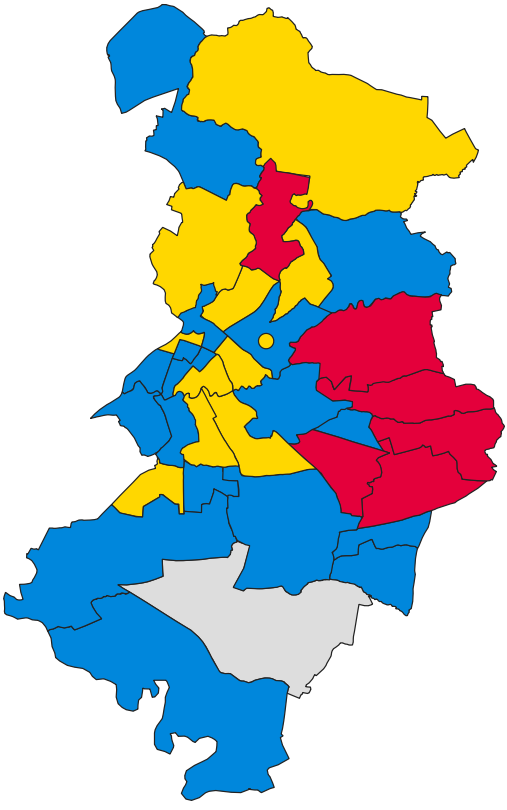
- Map of results of 1913 election
Leader of the Council before election
Conservative
Leader of the Council after election
Conservative

Elections to Manchester City Council were held on Saturday, 1 November 1913. One third of the councillors seats were up for election, with each successful candidate to serve a three-year term of office. The Conservative Party retained overall control of the council.

== Election result ==
| Party | Votes | | Seats | | | Full Council | |
| Conservative Party | 18,180 (44.2%) | ▼5.0 | 17 (48.6%) | 17 / 35 | ▼2 | 76 (54.3%) | 76 / 140 |
| Liberal Party | 12,015 (29.2%) | ▼0.2 | 11 (31.4%) | 11 / 35 | ▲2 | 41 (29.3%) | 41 / 140 |
| Labour Party | 7,855 (19.1%) | ▲2.1 | 6 (17.1%) | 6 / 35 | ▼1 | 15 (10.7%) | 15 / 140 |
| Independent | 2,457 (6.0%) | ▲5.1 | 1 (3.9%) | 1 / 35 | ▲1 | 8 (5.7%) | 8 / 140 |
| British Socialist Party | 642 (1.6%) | ▲0.2 | 0 (0.0%) | 0 / 35 | Steady | 0 (0.0%) | 0 / 140 |

=== Full council ===
↓
| 15 | 41 | 8 | 76 |

=== Aldermen ===
↓
| 14 | 1 | 20 |

=== Councillors ===
↓
| 15 | 27 | 7 | 58 |

== Ward results ==
=== All Saints' ===
All Saints'
| Party | Candidate | Votes | % | ±% |
|---|---|---|---|---|
| Liberal | M. J. O'Loughlin* | 837 | 59.4 | N/A |
| Independent | J. E. Hutchinson | 571 | 40.6 | N/A |
| Majority | | 266 | 18.8 | N/A |
| Turnout | | 1,408 | | |
| Liberal hold | | Swing | | |

=== Ardwick ===
Ardwick
| Party | Candidate | Votes | % | ±% |
|---|---|---|---|---|
| Conservative | K. W. Jones | uncontested | | |
| Conservative hold | | Swing | | |

=== Blackley and Moston ===
Blackley and Moston
| Party | Candidate | Votes | % | ±% |
|---|---|---|---|---|
| Liberal | A. Taylor | 1,537 | 38.8 | −10.8 |
| Conservative | T. McRoy | 1,320 | 33.3 | N/A |
| Labour | C. H. Brierley | 1,103 | 27.9 | −22.5 |
| Majority | | 217 | 5.5 | |
| Turnout | | 3,960 | | |
| Liberal gain from Labour | | Swing | | |

=== Bradford ===
Bradford
| Party | Candidate | Votes | % | ±% |
|---|---|---|---|---|
| Labour | T. Fox* | uncontested | | |
| Labour hold | | Swing | | |

=== Cheetham ===
Cheetham
| Party | Candidate | Votes | % | ±% |
|---|---|---|---|---|
| Liberal | J. J. Kendall* | uncontested | | |
| Liberal hold | | Swing | | |

=== Chorlton-cum-Hardy ===
Chorlton-cum-Hardy
| Party | Candidate | Votes | % | ±% |
|---|---|---|---|---|
| Conservative | J. Turner* | uncontested | | |
| Conservative hold | | Swing | | |

=== Collegiate Church ===
Collegiate Church
| Party | Candidate | Votes | % | ±% |
|---|---|---|---|---|
| Conservative | J. Hill* | 560 | 66.0 | +13.2 |
| Liberal | E. J. Bainbridge | 289 | 34.0 | −13.2 |
| Majority | | 271 | 32.0 | +26.4 |
| Turnout | | 849 | | |
| Conservative hold | | Swing | | |

=== Crumpsall ===
Crumpsall
| Party | Candidate | Votes | % | ±% |
|---|---|---|---|---|
| Conservative | H. Wood* | uncontested | | |
| Conservative hold | | Swing | | |

=== Didsbury ===
Didsbury
| Party | Candidate | Votes | % | ±% |
|---|---|---|---|---|
| Conservative | H. H. Bowden | 839 | 51.3 | N/A |
| Liberal | J. W. Cook* | 795 | 48.7 | N/A |
| Majority | | 44 | 2.6 | N/A |
| Turnout | | 1,634 | | |
| Conservative gain from Liberal | | Swing | | |

=== Exchange ===
Exchange
| Party | Candidate | Votes | % | ±% |
|---|---|---|---|---|
| Liberal | V. S. Wood* | uncontested | | |
| Liberal hold | | Swing | | |

=== Gorton North ===
Gorton North
| Party | Candidate | Votes | % | ±% |
|---|---|---|---|---|
| Labour | W. Davy* | 1,258 | 85.9 | N/A |
| Independent | J. Harold | 207 | 14.1 | N/A |
| Majority | | 1,051 | 71.8 | N/A |
| Turnout | | 1,465 | | |
| Labour hold | | Swing | | |

=== Gorton South ===
Gorton South
| Party | Candidate | Votes | % | ±% |
|---|---|---|---|---|
| Labour | R. J. Davies | 915 | 55.0 | N/A |
| Independent | J. Carpenter | 748 | 45.0 | N/A |
| Majority | | 167 | 10.0 | N/A |
| Turnout | | 1,663 | | |
| Labour hold | | Swing | | |

=== Harpurhey ===
Harpurhey
| Party | Candidate | Votes | % | ±% |
|---|---|---|---|---|
| Labour | W. T. Jackson* | uncontested | | |
| Labour hold | | Swing | | |

=== Levenshulme North ===
Levenshulme North
| Party | Candidate | Votes | % | ±% |
|---|---|---|---|---|
| Conservative | L. Dobson* | uncontested | | |
| Conservative hold | | Swing | | |

=== Levenshulme South ===
Levenshulme South
| Party | Candidate | Votes | % | ±% |
|---|---|---|---|---|
| Conservative | F. W. W. Breakell* | uncontested | | |
| Conservative hold | | Swing | | |

=== Longsight ===
Longsight
| Party | Candidate | Votes | % | ±% |
|---|---|---|---|---|
| Labour | E. Whiteley | 1,182 | 52.4 | +14.7 |
| Conservative | R. Bothwell | 1,073 | 47.6 | −14.7 |
| Majority | | 109 | 4.8 | |
| Turnout | | 2,255 | | |
| Labour gain from Conservative | | Swing | | |

=== Medlock Street ===
Medlock Street
| Party | Candidate | Votes | % | ±% |
|---|---|---|---|---|
| Conservative | W. J. Pine | 1,726 | 60.1 | N/A |
| Liberal | J. H. Dawson | 1,148 | 39.9 | N/A |
| Majority | | 578 | 20.2 | N/A |
| Turnout | | 2,874 | | |
| Conservative hold | | Swing | | |

=== Miles Platting ===
Miles Platting
| Party | Candidate | Votes | % | ±% |
|---|---|---|---|---|
| Liberal | J. Kemp* | uncontested | | |
| Liberal hold | | Swing | | |

=== Moss Side East ===
Moss Side East
| Party | Candidate | Votes | % | ±% |
|---|---|---|---|---|
| Conservative | C. Howard | 1,101 | 51.9 | +0.8 |
| Liberal | J. Wynne* | 1,021 | 48.1 | N/A |
| Majority | | 80 | 3.8 | +1.6 |
| Turnout | | 2,122 | | |
| Conservative gain from Liberal | | Swing | | |

=== Moss Side West ===
Moss Side West
| Party | Candidate | Votes | % | ±% |
|---|---|---|---|---|
| Liberal | J. Mathewson Watson | 1,077 | 51.8 | N/A |
| Conservative | J. H. Birley* | 1,002 | 48.2 | N/A |
| Majority | | 75 | 3.6 | N/A |
| Turnout | | 2,079 | | |
| Liberal gain from Conservative | | Swing | | |

=== New Cross ===
New Cross
| Party | Candidate | Votes | % | ±% |
|---|---|---|---|---|
| Conservative | J. C. Grime* | 2,336 | 78.4 | +12.8 |
| Liberal | G. Howarth | 1,481 | 49.7 | +11.4 |
| Labour | J. T. Jones* | 1,071 | 35.9 | N/A |
| Majority | | 410 | 13.8 | |
| Turnout | | 2,980 | | |
| Conservative hold | | Swing | | |
| Liberal gain from Labour | | Swing | | |

=== Newton Heath ===
Newton Heath
| Party | Candidate | Votes | % | ±% |
|---|---|---|---|---|
| Conservative | F. J. West* | uncontested | | |
| Conservative hold | | Swing | | |

=== Openshaw ===
Openshaw
| Party | Candidate | Votes | % | ±% |
|---|---|---|---|---|
| Labour | G. F. Titt* | 1,617 | 50.0 | −33.1 |
| Conservative | D. C. Goodman | 1,433 | 44.3 | N/A |
| British Socialist Party | W. Green | 183 | 5.7 | −11.2 |
| Majority | | 184 | 5.7 | −60.5 |
| Turnout | | 3,233 | | |
| Labour hold | | Swing | | |

=== Oxford ===
Oxford
| Party | Candidate | Votes | % | ±% |
|---|---|---|---|---|
| Liberal | W. Tattersall* | uncontested | | |
| Liberal hold | | Swing | | |

=== Rusholme ===
Rusholme
| Party | Candidate | Votes | % | ±% |
|---|---|---|---|---|
| Conservative | J. D. Chantler* | uncontested | | |
| Conservative hold | | Swing | | |

=== St. Ann's ===
St. Ann's
| Party | Candidate | Votes | % | ±% |
|---|---|---|---|---|
| Conservative | F. M. S. Grant | 578 | 52.9 | N/A |
| Liberal | W. Butterworth | 515 | 47.1 | N/A |
| Majority | | 63 | 5.8 | N/A |
| Turnout | | 1,093 | | |
| Conservative hold | | Swing | | |

=== St. Clement's ===
St. Clement's
| Party | Candidate | Votes | % | ±% |
|---|---|---|---|---|
| Liberal | T. C. Abbott* | uncontested | | |
| Liberal hold | | Swing | | |

=== St. George's ===
St. George's
| Party | Candidate | Votes | % | ±% |
|---|---|---|---|---|
| Conservative | W. Kay* | 1,510 | 76.7 | N/A |
| British Socialist Party | A. Mole | 459 | 23.3 | +2.6 |
| Majority | | 1,051 | 53.4 | |
| Turnout | | 1,969 | | |
| Conservative hold | | Swing | | |

=== St. James' ===
St. James'
| Party | Candidate | Votes | % | ±% |
|---|---|---|---|---|
| Conservative | A. H. Megson* | 311 | 50.8 | −0.4 |
| Liberal | W. Thomson | 301 | 49.2 | +0.4 |
| Majority | | 10 | 1.6 | −0.8 |
| Turnout | | 612 | | |
| Conservative hold | | Swing | | |

=== St. John's ===
St. John's
| Party | Candidate | Votes | % | ±% |
|---|---|---|---|---|
| Conservative | I. Hinchliffe* | uncontested | | |
| Conservative hold | | Swing | | |

=== St. Luke's ===
St. Luke's
| Party | Candidate | Votes | % | ±% |
|---|---|---|---|---|
| Liberal | J. H. Thewlis* | 1,667 | 54.2 | N/A |
| Conservative | A. E. B. Alexander | 1,407 | 45.8 | N/A |
| Majority | | 260 | 8.4 | N/A |
| Turnout | | 3,074 | | |
| Liberal hold | | Swing | | |

=== St. Mark's ===
St. Mark's
| Party | Candidate | Votes | % | ±% |
|---|---|---|---|---|
| Conservative | W. Chapman* | 991 | 58.3 | N/A |
| Labour | G. Hall | 709 | 41.7 | N/A |
| Majority | | 282 | 16.6 | N/A |
| Turnout | | 1,700 | | |
| Conservative hold | | Swing | | |

=== St. Michael's ===
St. Michael's
| Party | Candidate | Votes | % | ±% |
|---|---|---|---|---|
| Liberal | J. Reilly | 1,347 | 52.7 | +3.0 |
| Conservative | A. Hibbert* | 1,211 | 47.3 | −3.0 |
| Majority | | 136 | 5.4 | |
| Turnout | | 2,558 | | |
| Liberal gain from Conservative | | Swing | | |

=== Withington ===
Withington
| Party | Candidate | Votes | % | ±% |
|---|---|---|---|---|
| Independent | J. C. Jones | 931 | 54.3 | N/A |
| Conservative | R. R. Shaw | 782 | 45.7 | N/A |
| Majority | | 149 | 8.6 | N/A |
| Turnout | | 1,713 | | |
| Independent gain from Conservative | | Swing | | |

== Aldermanic elections ==
=== Aldermanic election, 10 November 1913 ===
At the meeting of the council on 10 November 1913, the terms of office of eighteen aldermen expired.

The following eighteen were elected as aldermen by the council on 10 November 1913 for a term of six years.

| Party | Alderman | Ward | Term expires |
|---|---|---|---|
| Conservative | G. K. Ashton* | Ardwick | 1919 |
| Conservative | R. A. D. Carter* | Levenshulme South | 1919 |
| Conservative | Samuel Dixon* | | 1919 |
| Conservative | James Fildes* | Openshaw | 1919 |
| Liberal | John Frowde* | Moss Side West | 1919 |
| Conservative | Thomas Hassall* | | 1919 |
| Conservative | Charles Jennison* | St. Ann's | 1919 |
| Conservative | John Jones* | Longsight | 1919 |
| Liberal | Daniel McCabe* | St. Michael's | 1919 |
| Conservative | W. T. Rothwell* | Oxford | 1919 |
| Conservative | Thomas Thornhill Shann* | | 1919 |
| Conservative | Thomas Smethurst* | Cheetham | 1919 |
| Conservative | John R. Smith* | Collegiate Church | 1919 |
| Liberal | Thomas Turnbull* | Withington | 1919 |
| Liberal | John Ward* | St. John's | 1919 |
| Liberal | W. H. Wainwright* | Medlock Street | 1919 |
| Liberal | William Walker* | Gorton South | 1919 |
| Conservative | Thomas Watmough | | 1919 |

=== Aldermanic election, 21 January 1914 ===
Caused by the resignation on 3 January 1914 of Alderman Sir William H. Vaudrey (Conservative, elected as an alderman by the council on 19 November 1902).

In his place, Councillor George Howarth (Liberal, New Cross, elected 1 November 1913; previously 1875-84, 1900-10, and 1910-12) was elected as an alderman by the council on 21 January 1914.

| Party | Alderman | Ward | Term expires |
|---|---|---|---|
| Liberal | George Howarth | Exchange | 1916 |

=== Aldermanic election, 20 May 1914 ===
Caused by the death on 2 May 1914 of Alderman Charles Jennison (Conservative, elected as an alderman by the council on 3 February 1904).

In his place, Councillor T. C. Abbott (Liberal, St. Clement's, elected 1 November 1910; previously 1890-96 and 1901-09) was elected as an alderman by the council on 20 May 1914.

| Party | Alderman | Ward | Term expires |
|---|---|---|---|
| Liberal | T. C. Abbott | St. Ann's | 1919 |

== By-elections between 1913 and 1914 ==
=== By-elections, 21 November 1913 ===
Three by-elections were held on 21 November 1913 to fill vacancies which had arisen in the city council.

==== Harpurhey ====
Caused by the resignation of Councillor John Hargreaves (Conservative, Harpurhey, elected 1 November 1906) on 10 November 1913.

Harpurhey
| Party | Candidate | Votes | % | ±% |
|---|---|---|---|---|
| Conservative | T. McRoy | 1,924 | 46.5 | N/A |
| Labour | R. Bebbington | 1,489 | 36.0 | N/A |
| Liberal | J. Bailey | 721 | 17.5 | N/A |
| Majority | | 435 | 10.5 | N/A |
| Turnout | | 4,134 | 53.5 | N/A |
| Conservative hold | | Swing | | |

==== New Cross ====
Caused by the resignation of Councillor C. E. B. Russell (Conservative, New Cross, elected 1 November 1912) on 10 November 1913.

New Cross
| Party | Candidate | Votes | % | ±% |
|---|---|---|---|---|
| Conservative | C. B. Walker | 1,755 | 59.0 | −19.4 |
| Labour | F. Lowe | 1,218 | 41.0 | +5.1 |
| Majority | | 537 | 18.0 | |
| Turnout | | 2,973 | 49.8 | |
| Conservative hold | | Swing | | |

==== St. John's ====
Caused by the election as an alderman of Councillor Thomas Watmough (Conservative, St. John's, elected 1 November 1899) on 10 November 1913, following the resignation on 10 November 1913 of Alderman John Richards (Conservative, elected as an alderman by the council on 20 October 1897).

St. John's
| Party | Candidate | Votes | % | ±% |
|---|---|---|---|---|
| Conservative | J. Bayliss | 339 | 51.3 | N/A |
| Liberal | H. Forth | 322 | 48.7 | N/A |
| Majority | | 17 | 2.6 | N/A |
| Turnout | | 661 | 69.2 | N/A |
| Conservative hold | | Swing | | |

=== New Cross, 3 February 1914 ===
Caused by the election as an alderman of Councillor George Howarth (Liberal, New Cross, elected 1 November 1913; previously 1875-84, 1900-10, and 1910-12) on 21 January 1914 following the resignation on 3 January 1914 of Alderman Sir William H. Vaudrey (Conservative, elected as an alderman by the council on 19 November 1902).

New Cross
| Party | Candidate | Votes | % | ±% |
|---|---|---|---|---|
| Conservative | O. R. Whittaker | 1,240 | 53.2 | −25.2 |
| Labour | F. Lowe | 1,019 | 43.7 | +7.8 |
| British Socialist Party | F. W. Sanderson | 73 | 3.1 | N/A |
| Majority | | 221 | 9.5 | |
| Turnout | | 2,332 | | |
| Conservative gain from Liberal | | Swing | | |

=== By-elections, 30 May 1914 ===
Two by-elections were held on 30 May 1914 to fill vacancies which had arisen in the city council.

==== Blackley and Moston ====
Caused by the death of Councillor George Bennett (Liberal, Blackley & Moston, elected 1 November 1902) on 11 May 1914.

Blackley and Moston
| Party | Candidate | Votes | % | ±% |
|---|---|---|---|---|
| Liberal | T. S. Williams | uncontested | | |
| Liberal hold | | Swing | | |

==== St. Clement's ====
Caused by the election as an alderman of Councillor T. C. Abbott (Liberal, St. Clement's, elected 1 November 1910; previously 1890-96 and 1901-09) on 20 May 1914 following the death on 2 May 1914 of Alderman Charles Jennison (Conservative, elected as an alderman by the council on 3 February 1904).

St. Clement's
| Party | Candidate | Votes | % | ±% |
|---|---|---|---|---|
| Liberal | W. Harrop | 563 | 58.2 | N/A |
| Conservative | E. S. Ball | 404 | 41.8 | N/A |
| Majority | | 159 | 16.4 | N/A |
| Turnout | | 967 | | |
| Liberal hold | | Swing | | |

=== Moss Side West, 12 October 1914 ===
Caused by the resignation of Councillor William Flanagan (Conservative, Moss Side West, elected 26 April 1907) on 7 October 1914.

Moss Side West
| Party | Candidate | Votes | % | ±% |
|---|---|---|---|---|
| Conservative | J. H. Birley | uncontested | | |
| Conservative hold | | Swing | | |
