= Thomas William Kerry =

British trade unionist

Thomas William Kerry (3 June 1883 – 13 October 1967) was a British trade unionist, who served as chair of the National Union of General and Municipal Workers (NUGMW).

Kerry was born in Norfolk on 2 June 1883. first began union activity when he was living in Lincoln, becoming the full-time local secretary for the National Union of General Workers. In 1923, he moved to Kingston upon Hull to become a district organiser for the union, working under district secretary R. H. Farrah, and he continued in this post when the union became part of the NUGMW.

In 1926, Kerry was elected to Hull City Council, representing the Labour Party in the West Central ward. He served as secretary of the Labour group on the council for much of the 1930s, and around the middle of the decade was appointed as an alderman. Through his position on the council, he served on numerous committees; he also served on the Joint Industrial Committee for the gas, flour milling, and water industries through his trade union work.

Farrah died in 1932, and Kerry replaced him as district secretary. In 1937, his district was enlarged to cover much of the Midlands, and in order to effectively administer it, he relocated to Nottingham. For the following year, he commuted back to Hull to attend council meetings, but he then stood down and focused on his union work.

In 1946, Kerry was elected as the chair of the NUGMW. He retired a few years later, and died in Nottingham on 13 October 1967, at the age of 84.

Trade union offices
Preceded by Fred Marshall	Chair of the National Union of General and Municipal Workers; 1946–1949	Succeeded by William E. Hopkin
