= R. H. Farrah =

British trade unionist and politician

Robert Henry Farrah (17 February 1863 – 17 February 1932) was a British trade unionist and politician.

Farrah undertook an apprentice as a lath renderer with the Hull and Barnsley Railway. He became interested in trade unionism, and joined the National Labour Federation (NLF). By 1893, the NLF was collapsing, and its Hull branches formed the Hull District Labour Federation, with Farrah as president. The union proved sustainable, increasing its membership, before in 1896 it merged into the National Union of Gas Workers and General Labourers.

Around this time, Farrah spent some time running his own business, and was based in a variety of cities, before returning to Hull. There, he joined the Labour Industrial Group, and won election to the School Board, and then to the Alexandra ward of Hull City Council.

Farrah maintained his contacts with the Gas Labourers' Union, serving on its national executive and general council. In 1911, he resigned from the council, to take up the full-time position of district secretary for the union, succeeding W. Hare.

At the 1918 United Kingdom general election, Farrah stood for the Labour Party in Kingston upon Hull East. The first Labour candidate for the seat, he took third place with 20.4% of the vote. He re-entered Hull City Council in 1926. He sat on a large number of committees, and advocated for the construction of a Humber Bridge. The Labour Party wished to put him forward as a candidate for Lord Mayor of Hull, but he refused, as his health was declining.

In 1924, the Gas Workers' Union became part of the National Union of General and Municipal Workers, but Farrah remained in post as district secretary. Even as his health worsened, he held the position, supported by district organiser T. W. Kerry. Farrah he died on his 69th birthday, in 1932.

Trade union offices
Preceded by W. Hare	Hull District Secretary of the National Union of Gas Workers and General Labourers; 1911–1924	Succeeded by Position abolished
Preceded by New position	Hull District Secretary of the National Union of General and Municipal Workers; 1924–1932	Succeeded by Thomas William Kerry
