= Thomas Cary =

Thomas Cary may refer to:

- Thomas Cary (North Carolina politician), deputy governor of the Province of Carolina 1705–1711, and leader of Cary's Rebellion
- Thomas Cary or Thomas Kerry (MP) for Leominster (UK Parliament constituency)
- Thomas Cary (publisher) of Quebec Mercury
- Thomas Cary, High Sheriff of Somerset, 1343–1353

== See also ==
- Thomas Carey (disambiguation)
