= Amalgamated Society of Gas Workers, Brickmakers and General Labourers =

Former trade union of the United Kingdom

- Merged into: National Union of General Workers
- Founded: 1889
- Dissolved: 1921
- Headquarters: 34 Ruskin Buildings, Corporation Street, Birmingham
- Location: United Kingdom
- Members: 17,240 (1915); 46,173 (1921)

The Amalgamated Society of Gas Workers, Brickmakers and General Labourers (ASGWBM&GL) was a trade union representing labourers in the United Kingdom, particularly in the Birmingham area.

The union was established in 1889, on the initiative of Eli Bloor and Allen Granger, leaders of established trade unions in Birmingham. By 1892, it had 2,846 members and began absorbing smaller unions, including the Bristol Iron Plate Trade Society in 1896, and the Birmingham Public Workers Labourers in 1897. Membership grew to 5,020 by 1897.

The Scottish Ploughmen, Carters and General Labourers Federal Union joined the society in 1900, but soon left due to confusion. The Frost Cog and Screw Makers Society merged in 1911. Membership continued to grow, reaching 17,240 when the Birmingham and District Municipal Employees' Association joined in 1915. That year, the union renamed itself the "Amalgamated Society of Gas, Municipal and General Workers".

In 1921, the union merged with the National Union of General Workers.

== General Secretaries ==
1889: Robert Toller
1907: Henry Simpson
