= Levenshulme South (ward) =

- Ward
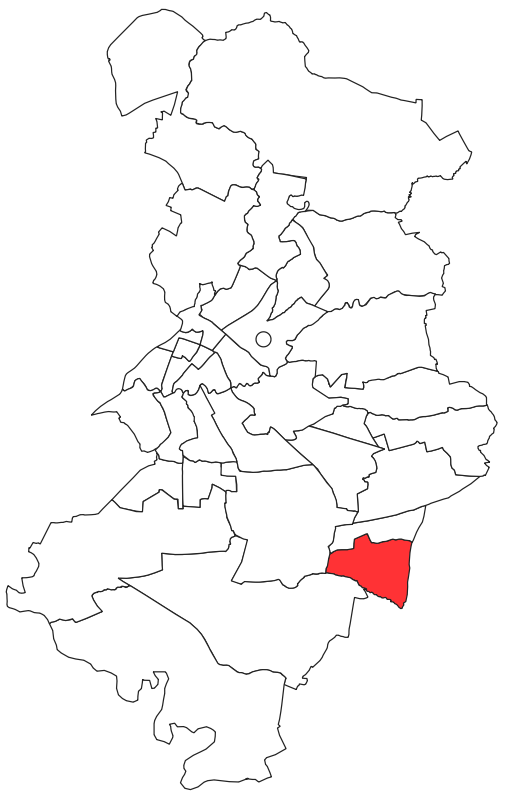
- Levenshulme South ward (1909) within Manchester

- Coat of arms
- Country: United Kingdom
- Constituent country: England
- Region: North West England
- County borough: Manchester
- Created: November 1909
- Named for: Levenshulme

Government
  - Type: Unicameral
  - Body: Manchester City Council
- UK Parliamentary Constituency: Gorton

Levenshulme South was an electoral division of Manchester City Council which was represented from 1909 until 1919. It covered part of Levenshulme in South Manchester.

== Overview ==
Levenshulme South ward was created in 1909, as a result of the Manchester Extension Scheme 1909, which transferred the urban districts of Gorton and Levenshulme to the Manchester corporation. Initially, the ward's boundaries corresponded with those of the South East and South West wards of the former Levenshulme Urban District. In 1919, the ward was abolished and merged with the Levenshulme North ward to form a single Levenshulme ward.

For the entirety of its existence, the ward formed part of the Gorton Parliamentary constituency.

== Councillors ==
Election	Councillor	Councillor	Councillor
1909	J. Harrison (Ind)	M. E. Mitchell (Lib)	J. Siddall (Lib)
1910	J. Harrison (Ind)	M. E. Mitchell (Lib)	F. W. W. Breakell (Con)
1911	J. Harrison (Ind)	M. E. Mitchell (Lib)	F. W. W. Breakell (Con)
1912	J. Harrison (Ind)	M. E. Mitchell (Lib)	F. W. W. Breakell (Con)
1913	J. Harrison (Ind)	M. E. Mitchell (Lib)	F. W. W. Breakell (Con)
1914	J. Harrison (Ind)	M. E. Mitchell (Lib)	F. W. W. Breakell (Con)

== Elections ==
=== Elections in 1900s ===
==== November 1909 ====
1909 (3 vacancies)
Party	Candidate	Votes	%	±%
Independent	J. Harrison	669	58.2	
Liberal	M. E. Mitchell	592	51.5	
Liberal	J. Siddall	587	51.0	
Conservative	F. W. W. Breakell	567	49.3	
Conservative	F. Fenn	528	45.9	
Conservative	H. M. Emery	508	44.2	
Majority		20	1.7	
Turnout		1,150		
Independent win (new seat)				
Liberal win (new seat)				
Liberal win (new seat)				

=== Elections in 1910s ===
==== November 1910 ====
1910
Party	Candidate	Votes	%	±%
Conservative	F. W. W. Breakell	692	51.7	+2.4
Liberal	J. Siddall*	646	48.3	−3.2
Majority		46	3.4	
Turnout		1,338		
Conservative gain from Liberal		Swing		

==== November 1911 ====
1911
Party	Candidate	Votes	%	±%
Liberal	M. E. Mitchell	788	52.6	+4.3
Conservative	H. M. Emery	709	47.4	−4.3
Majority		79	5.2	
Turnout		1,497		
Liberal hold		Swing		

==== November 1912 ====
1912
Party	Candidate	Votes	%	±%
Independent	J. Harrison*	uncontested		
Independent hold		Swing		

==== November 1913 ====
1913
Party	Candidate	Votes	%	±%
Conservative	F. W. W. Breakell*	uncontested		
Conservative hold		Swing		

==== November 1914 ====
1914
Party	Candidate	Votes	%	±%
Liberal	M. E. Mitchell*	uncontested		
Liberal hold		Swing		

== See also ==
- Manchester City Council
- Manchester City Council elections
