= 1910 Manchester City Council election =

Local election in Manchester

- 1 November 1910

35 of 140 seats to Manchester City Council 71 seats needed for a majority
	First party	Second party	Third party
Party	Conservative	Liberal	Labour
Last election	23 seats, 46.3%	11 seats, 18.3%	6 seats, 29.9%
Seats before	73	46	10
Seats won	19	9	7
Seats after	73	45	15
Seat change	Steady	▼1	▲5
Popular vote	21,156	13,797	14,070
Percentage	38.5%	25.1%	25.6%
Swing	▼7.8%	▲6.8%	▼4.3%
	Fourth party
Party	Independent
Last election	3 seats, 5.5%
Seats before	11
Seats won	0
Seats after	7
Seat change	▼4
Popular vote	5,861
Percentage	10.7%
Swing	▲5.2%
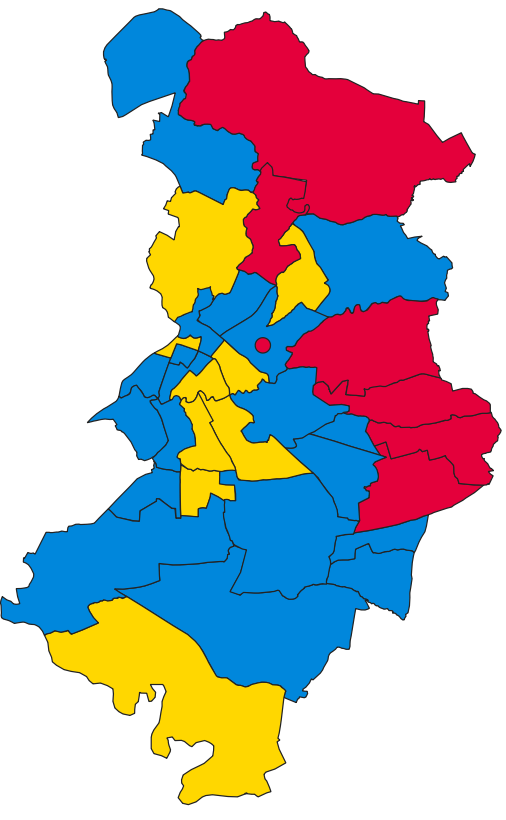
- Map of results of 1910 election
Leader of the Council before election
Conservative
Leader of the Council after election
Conservative

Elections to Manchester City Council were held on Tuesday, 1 November 1910. One third of the councillors seats were up for election, with each successful candidate to serve a three-year term of office. The Conservative Party retained overall control of the council.

== Election result ==
Party	Votes		Seats			Full Council	
Conservative Party	21,156 (38.5%)	▼7.8	19 (54.3%)	19 / 35	Steady	73 (52.1%)	73 / 140
Liberal Party	13,797 (25.1%)	▲6.8	9 (25.7%)	9 / 35	▼1	45 (32.1%)	45 / 140
Labour Party	14,070 (25.6%)	▼4.3	7 (20.0%)	7 / 35	▲5	15 (10.7%)	15 / 140
Independent	5,861 (10.7%)	▲5.2	0 (0.0%)	0 / 35	▼4	7 (5.0%)	7 / 140

=== Full council ===
↓
15	45	7	73

=== Aldermen ===
↓
18	1	16

=== Councillors ===
↓
15	27	6	57

== Ward results ==
=== All Saints' ===
All Saints'
Party	Candidate	Votes	%	±%
Liberal	M. J. O'Loughlin	731	52.2	N/A
Independent	J. E. Hutchinson	670	47.8	+18.8
Majority		61	4.4	
Turnout		1,401		
Liberal gain from Independent		Swing		

=== Ardwick ===
Ardwick
Party	Candidate	Votes	%	±%
Conservative	F. Sturgess	1,333	35.1	−15.4
Labour	J. M. McLachlan	1,288	33.9	−15.6
Liberal	F. Smith	1,176	31.0	N/A
Majority		45	1.2	+0.2
Turnout		3,797		
Conservative hold		Swing		

=== Blackley and Moston ===
Blackley and Moston
Party	Candidate	Votes	%	±%
Labour	W. Phillips	1,775	52.0	−0.4
Conservative	C. G. L. Skinner*	1,636	48.0	+0.4
Majority		139	4.0	−0.8
Turnout		3,411		
Labour gain from Conservative		Swing		

=== Bradford ===
Bradford
Party	Candidate	Votes	%	±%
Labour	T. Fox*	2,684	56.0	N/A
Conservative	G. W. Pendlebury	2,106	44.0	N/A
Majority		578	12.0	N/A
Turnout		4,790		
Labour hold		Swing		

=== Cheetham ===
Cheetham
Party	Candidate	Votes	%	±%
Liberal	J. J. Kendall*	uncontested		
Liberal hold		Swing		

=== Chorlton-cum-Hardy ===
Chorlton-cum-Hardy
Party	Candidate	Votes	%	±%
Conservative	J. Turner*	uncontested		
Conservative hold		Swing		

=== Collegiate Church ===
Collegiate Church
Party	Candidate	Votes	%	±%
Conservative	J. R. Smith*	uncontested		
Conservative hold		Swing		

=== Crumpsall ===
Crumpsall
Party	Candidate	Votes	%	±%
Conservative	H. Wood	788	53.8	−16.2
Independent	I. Platt*	676	46.2	N/A
Majority		112	7.6	−32.4
Turnout		1,464		
Conservative gain from Independent		Swing		

=== Didsbury ===
Didsbury
Party	Candidate	Votes	%	±%
Liberal	J. W. Cook*	uncontested		
Liberal hold		Swing		

=== Exchange ===
Exchange
Party	Candidate	Votes	%	±%
Liberal	V. S. Wood	346	50.7	N/A
Conservative	T. B. Grimshaw	337	49.3	N/A
Majority		9	1.4	N/A
Turnout		683		
Liberal gain from Independent		Swing		

=== Gorton North ===
Gorton North
Party	Candidate	Votes	%	±%
Labour	W. Davy	1,018	53.8	+0.5
Conservative	J. A. Lofts*	875	46.2	−3.4
Majority		143	7.6	
Turnout		1,893		
Labour gain from Conservative		Swing		

=== Gorton South ===
Gorton South
Party	Candidate	Votes	%	±%
Labour	T. Lowth	870	56.1	+1.6
Independent	M. Bushell	681	43.9	N/A
Majority		189	12.2	
Turnout		1,551		
Labour gain from Liberal		Swing		

=== Harpurhey ===
Harpurhey
Party	Candidate	Votes	%	±%
Labour	W. T. Jackson*	2,016	52.5	−3.1
Conservative	W. Gilgryst	1,822	47.5	−3.1
Majority		194	5.0	
Turnout		3,838		
Labour hold		Swing		

=== Levenshulme North ===
Levenshulme North
Party	Candidate	Votes	%	±%
Conservative	L. Dobson*	713	59.4	−3.4
Liberal	C. Peach	487	40.6	−2.7
Majority		226	18.8	
Turnout		1,200		
Conservative hold		Swing		

=== Levenshulme South ===
Levenshulme South
Party	Candidate	Votes	%	±%
Conservative	F. W. W. Breakell	692	51.7	+2.4
Liberal	J. Siddall*	646	48.3	−3.2
Majority		46	3.4	
Turnout		1,338		
Conservative gain from Liberal		Swing		

=== Longsight ===
Longsight
Party	Candidate	Votes	%	±%
Conservative	J. Wallwork	1,054	43.0	−8.9
Liberal	H. Hodkin*	900	36.7	+15.3
Labour	G. Hall	498	20.3	−6.4
Majority		154	6.3	−18.9
Turnout		2,452		
Conservative gain from Liberal		Swing		

=== Medlock Street ===
Medlock Street
Party	Candidate	Votes	%	±%
Conservative	W. G. Lecomber	1,526	59.2	−1.6
Liberal	K. T. S. Dockray	954	37.0	N/A
Independent	J. Kernahan	96	3.8	N/A
Majority		572	22.2	+0.6
Turnout		2,576		
Conservative hold		Swing		

=== Miles Platting ===
Miles Platting
Party	Candidate	Votes	%	±%
Liberal	J. Kemp*	1,238	85.4	N/A
Conservative	G. Stephenson	212	14.6	−39.7
Majority		1,026	70.8	
Turnout		1,450		
Liberal hold		Swing		

=== Moss Side East ===
Moss Side East
Party	Candidate	Votes	%	±%
Liberal	J. Wynne*	932	54.6	+6.2
Independent	W. Stanway	774	45.4	N/A
Majority		158	9.2	
Turnout		1,706		
Liberal hold		Swing		

=== Moss Side West ===
Moss Side West
Party	Candidate	Votes	%	±%
Conservative	J. H. Birley*	uncontested		
Conservative hold		Swing		

=== New Cross ===
New Cross
Party	Candidate	Votes	%	±%
Conservative	J. Grime*	2,297	73.7	+2.0
Labour	J. T. Jones	1,401	44.9	+4.1
Liberal	G. Howarth*	1,135	36.4	N/A
Majority		266	8.5	
Turnout		3,117		
Conservative hold		Swing		
Labour gain from Liberal		Swing		

=== Newton Heath ===
Newton Heath
Party	Candidate	Votes	%	±%
Conservative	F. J. West*	uncontested		
Conservative hold		Swing		

=== Openshaw ===
Openshaw
Party	Candidate	Votes	%	±%
Labour	G. F. Titt	1,482*	50.0	−5.9
Independent	J. Caminada*	1,482	50.0	N/A
Majority		0	0.0	−11.8
Turnout		3,106		
Labour gain from Independent		Swing		

* Two candidates having received 1,482 votes each, Titt was returned on the Alderman's casting vote

=== Oxford ===
Oxford
Party	Candidate	Votes	%	±%
Liberal	W. Tattersall	uncontested		
Liberal hold		Swing		

=== Rusholme ===
Rusholme
Party	Candidate	Votes	%	±%
Conservative	J. D. Chantler*	1,729	52.3	−8.4
Liberal	E. F. M. Susman	1,578	47.7	N/A
Majority		151	4.6	−16.8
Turnout		3,307		
Conservative hold		Swing		

=== St. Ann's ===
St. Ann's
Party	Candidate	Votes	%	±%
Conservative	J. Burgess*	uncontested		
Conservative hold		Swing		

=== St. Clement's ===
St. Clement's
Party	Candidate	Votes	%	±%
Liberal	T. C. Abbott	532	53.8	N/A
Conservative	W. E. Pownall	456	46.2	N/A
Majority		76	7.6	N/A
Turnout		988		
Liberal gain from Conservative		Swing		

=== St. George's ===
St. George's
Party	Candidate	Votes	%	±%
Conservative	W. Kay*	1,576	60.3	+10.4
Labour	F. Lowe	1,038	39.7	N/A
Majority		538	20.6	
Turnout		2,614		
Conservative hold		Swing		

=== St. James' ===
St. James'
Party	Candidate	Votes	%	±%
Conservative	A. H. Megson*	325	56.0	N/A
Liberal	W. Thomson	255	44.0	N/A
Majority		70	12.0	N/A
Turnout		580		
Conservative hold		Swing		

=== St. John's ===
St. John's
Party	Candidate	Votes	%	±%
Conservative	I. Hinchliffe	478	64.4	+4.5
Liberal	E. B. A. Jones	264	35.6	−4.5
Majority		214	28.8	+9.0
Turnout		742		
Conservative hold		Swing		

=== St. Luke's ===
St. Luke's
Party	Candidate	Votes	%	±%
Liberal	J. H. Thewlis*	1,607	52.0	N/A
Independent	H. M. Ross Clyne*	1,482	48.0	N/A
Majority		125	4.0	
Turnout		3,089		
Liberal hold		Swing		

=== St. Mark's ===
St. Mark's
Party	Candidate	Votes	%	±%
Conservative	W. Chapman*	uncontested		
Conservative hold		Swing		

=== St. Michael's ===
St. Michael's
Party	Candidate	Votes	%	±%
Conservative	A. Hibbert*	1,301	56.2	N/A
Liberal	C. Egan	1,016	43.8	N/A
Majority		285	12.4	N/A
Turnout		2,317		
Conservative hold		Swing		

=== Withington ===
Withington
Party	Candidate	Votes	%	±%
Conservative	S. Edwards*	uncontested		
Conservative hold		Swing		

== Aldermanic elections ==
=== Aldermanic election, 9 November 1910 ===
At the meeting of the council on 9 November 1910, the terms of office of seventeen aldermen expired.

The following seventeen were elected as aldermen by the council on 9 November 1910 for a term of six years.

Party	Alderman	Ward	Term expires
Liberal	William Birkbeck*	New Cross	1916
Liberal	James Bowes*	Miles Platting	1916
Liberal	Daniel Boyle*	St. Luke's	1916
Conservative	Henry Richard Box*	Moss Side East	1916
Conservative	Richard Burtles*	Levenshulme North	1916
Conservative	Arthur Copeland*	St. James'	1916
Liberal	Hermann Goldschmidt*		1916
Conservative	Walter Harwood*	Didsbury	1916
Conservative	Edward Holt*	Crumpsall	1916
Conservative	Christopher Hornby	All Saints'	1916
Independent	Fletcher Moss*		1916
Liberal	Fred Pogson*	Gorton North	1916
Liberal	Henry Plummer*	Rusholme	1916
Liberal	John Royle*	St. George's	1916
Liberal	William Trevor*	St. Clement's	1916
Conservative	Sir William H. Vaudrey*	Exchange	1916
Conservative	John Robert Wilson*		1916

=== Aldermanic election, 22 February 1911 ===
Caused by the death on 8 February 1911 of Alderman William Trevor (Liberal, elected as an alderman by the council on 1 February 1905).

In his place, Councillor John Harrop (Liberal, St. Clement's, elected 1 November 1897) was elected as an alderman by the council on 22 February 1911.

Party	Alderman	Ward	Term expires
Liberal	John Harrop	St. Clement's	1916

=== Aldermanic election, 14 June 1911 ===
Caused by the death on 28 May 1911 of Alderman Thomas Briggs (Conservative, elected as an alderman by the council on 9 November 1901).

In his place, Councillor G. K. Ashton (Conservative, Rusholme, elected 1 November 1897) was elected as an alderman by the council on 14 June 1911.

Party	Alderman	Ward	Term expires
Conservative	G. K. Ashton	Ardwick	1913

== By-elections between 1910 and 1911 ==
=== Bradford, 8 November 1910 ===
Caused by the resignation of Councillor John Edward Sutton M.P. (Labour, Bradford, elected 1 November 1894) on 26 October 1910.

Bradford
Party	Candidate	Votes	%	±%
Liberal	T. L. Morris	2,408	51.4	N/A
Labour	W. Davies	2,273	48.6	−7.4
Majority		135	2.8	
Turnout		4,681		
Liberal gain from Labour		Swing		

=== By-elections, 21 November 1910 ===
Two by-elections were held on 21 November 1910 to fill vacancies which had arisen in the city council.

==== All Saints' ====
Caused by the election as an alderman of Councillor Christopher Hornby (Conservative, All Saints', elected 1 November 1897) on 9 November 1910 following the resignation on 9 November 1910 of Alderman Walton Smith (Liberal, elected as an alderman by the council on 18 October 1883).

All Saints'
Party	Candidate	Votes	%	±%
Independent	H. M. Ross Clyne	984	64.4	+16.6
Liberal	W. Radcliffe	545	35.6	−16.6
Majority		439	28.8	
Turnout		1,529		
Independent gain from Conservative		Swing		

==== Chorlton-cum-Hardy ====
Caused by the resignation of Councillor Alexander Thomson (Liberal, Chorlton-cum-Hardy, elected 8 March 1910) on 9 November 1910.

Chorlton-cum-Hardy
Party	Candidate	Votes	%	±%
Liberal	G. Howarth*	1,206	67.1	N/A
Independent	W. Stanway	591	32.9	N/A
Majority		615	34.2	N/A
Turnout		1,797		
Liberal hold		Swing		

=== St. Michael's, 25 November 1910 ===
Caused by the death of Councillor Thomas Quinn Ruddin (Liberal, St. Michael's, elected 1 November 1897) on 10 November 1910.

St. Michael's
Party	Candidate	Votes	%	±%
Conservative	T. Boyle	1,032	48.7	−7.5
Liberal	C. Egan	1,021	48.2	+4.4
Labour	A. Ogden	67	3.1	N/A
Majority		11	0.5	−11.9
Turnout		2,120		
Conservative gain from Liberal		Swing		

=== St. Clement's, 8 March 1911 ===
Caused by the election as an alderman of Councillor John Harrop (Liberal, St. Clement's, elected 1 November 1897) on 22 February 1911 following the death on 8 February 1911 of Alderman William Trevor (Liberal, elected as an alderman by the council on 1 February 1905).

St. Clement's
Party	Candidate	Votes	%	±%
Liberal	J. H. Helm	583	54.8	+1.0
Conservative	W. E. Pownall	481	45.2	−1.0
Majority		102	9.6	+2.0
Turnout		1,064		
Liberal hold		Swing		

=== Rusholme, 27 June 1911 ===
Caused by the election as an alderman of Councillor G. K. Ashton (Conservative, Rusholme, elected 1 November 1897) on 14 June 1911 following the death on 28 May 1911 of Alderman Thomas Briggs (Conservative, elected as an alderman by the council on 9 November 1901).

Rusholme
Party	Candidate	Votes	%	±%
Liberal	E. F. M. Susman	1,772	56.0	+8.3
Conservative	C. Phillips	1,392	44.0	−8.3
Majority		380	12.0	
Turnout		3,164		
Liberal gain from Conservative		Swing		
