= 1912 Manchester City Council election =

Local election in Manchester

- 1 November 1912

35 of 140 seats to Manchester City Council 71 seats needed for a majority
| | First party | Second party | Third party |
|---|---|---|---|
| Party | Conservative | Liberal | Labour |
| Last election | 15 seats, 45.7% | 11 seats, 23.6% | 6 seats, 26.9% |
| Seats before | 75 | 42 | 16 |
| Seats won | 23 | 6 | 3 |
| Seats after | 77 | 40 | 16 |
| Seat change | ▲2 | ▼2 | Steady |
| Popular vote | 20,685 | 12,361 | 7,164 |
| Percentage | 49.2% | 29.4% | 17.0% |
| Swing | ▲3.5% | ▲5.8% | ▼9.9% |
| | Fourth party |
| Party | Independent |
| Last election | 3 seats, 3.7% |
| Seats before | 7 |
| Seats won | 3 |
| Seats after | 7 |
| Seat change | Steady |
| Popular vote | 364 |
| Percentage | 0.9% |
| Swing | ▼2.8% |
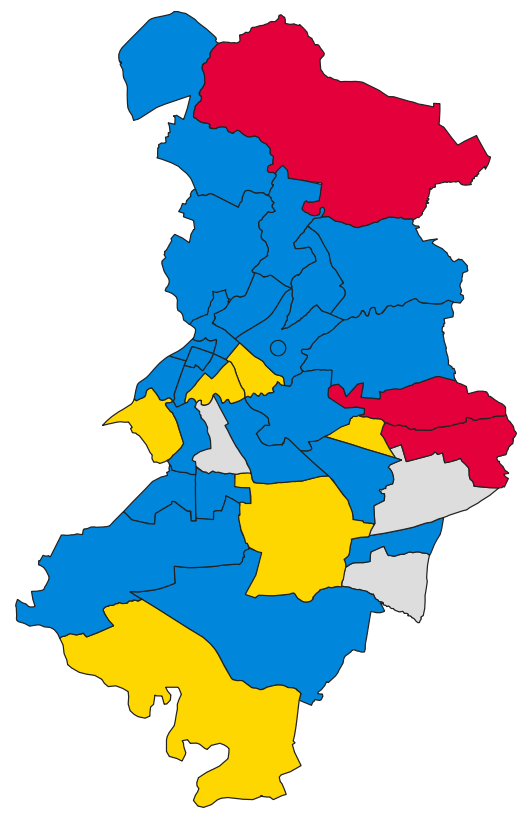
- Map of results of 1912 election
Leader of the Council before election
Conservative
Leader of the Council after election
Conservative

Elections to Manchester City Council were held on Friday, 1 November 1912. One third of the councillors seats were up for election, with each successful candidate to serve a three-year term of office. The Conservative Party retained overall control of the council.

== Election result ==
| Party | Votes | | Seats | | | Full Council | |
| Conservative Party | 20,685 (49.2%) | ▲3.5 | 23 (65.7%) | 23 / 35 | ▲2 | 77 (55.0%) | 77 / 140 |
| Liberal Party | 12,361 (29.4%) | ▲5.8 | 6 (17.1%) | 6 / 35 | ▼2 | 40 (28.6%) | 40 / 140 |
| Labour Party | 7,164 (17.0%) | ▼9.9 | 3 (8.6%) | 3 / 35 | Steady | 16 (11.4%) | 16 / 140 |
| Independent | 364 (0.9%) | ▼2.8 | 3 (8.6%) | 3 / 35 | Steady | 7 (5.0%) | 7 / 140 |
| English League for the Taxation of Land Values | 870 (2.1%) | N/A | 0 (0.0%) | 0 / 35 | N/A | 0 (0.0%) | 0 / 140 |
| British Socialist Party | 601 (1.4%) | ▲1.2 | 0 (0.0%) | 0 / 35 | Steady | 0 (0.0%) | 0 / 140 |

=== Full council ===
↓
| 16 | 40 | 7 | 77 |

=== Aldermen ===
↓
| 15 | 1 | 19 |

=== Councillors ===
↓
| 16 | 25 | 6 | 58 |

== Ward results ==
=== All Saints' ===
All Saints'
| Party | Candidate | Votes | % | ±% |
|---|---|---|---|---|
| Independent | H. M. Ross Clyne* | uncontested | | |
| Independent hold | | Swing | | |

=== Ardwick ===
Ardwick
| Party | Candidate | Votes | % | ±% |
|---|---|---|---|---|
| Conservative | J. E. Chapman | 2,015 | 57.8 | +9.2 |
| Labour | F. Lowe | 977 | 28.0 | −23.4 |
| Liberal | J. M. Bernstein | 494 | 14.2 | N/A |
| Majority | | 1,038 | 29.8 | |
| Turnout | | 3,486 | | |
| Conservative hold | | Swing | | |

=== Blackley and Moston ===
Blackley and Moston
| Party | Candidate | Votes | % | ±% |
|---|---|---|---|---|
| Labour | J. Johnston* | 1,786 | 50.4 | +17.8 |
| Liberal | A. Taylor | 1,755 | 49.6 | −17.8 |
| Majority | | 31 | 0.8 | |
| Turnout | | 3,541 | | |
| Labour hold | | Swing | | |

=== Bradford ===
Bradford
| Party | Candidate | Votes | % | ±% |
|---|---|---|---|---|
| Conservative | G. W. Pendlebury* | 2,837 | 68.9 | +26.4 |
| Liberal | W. Davies | 1,278 | 31.1 | N/A |
| Majority | | 1,609 | 39.2 | |
| Turnout | | 4,115 | | |
| Conservative hold | | Swing | | |

=== Cheetham ===
Cheetham
| Party | Candidate | Votes | % | ±% |
|---|---|---|---|---|
| Conservative | C. A. Wood* | uncontested | | |
| Conservative hold | | Swing | | |

=== Chorlton-cum-Hardy ===
Chorlton-cum-Hardy
| Party | Candidate | Votes | % | ±% |
|---|---|---|---|---|
| Conservative | J. C. Booth | 1,407 | 50.4 | +10.6 |
| Liberal | G. Howarth* | 1,383 | 49.6 | N/A |
| Majority | | 24 | 0.8 | |
| Turnout | | 2,790 | | |
| Conservative gain from Liberal | | Swing | | |

=== Collegiate Church ===
Collegiate Church
| Party | Candidate | Votes | % | ±% |
|---|---|---|---|---|
| Conservative | P. Taylor | 456 | 52.8 | N/A |
| Liberal | E. Barker* | 408 | 47.2 | N/A |
| Majority | | 48 | 5.6 | N/A |
| Turnout | | 864 | | |
| Conservative gain from Liberal | | Swing | | |

=== Crumpsall ===
Crumpsall
| Party | Candidate | Votes | % | ±% |
|---|---|---|---|---|
| Conservative | F. Todd* | uncontested | | |
| Conservative hold | | Swing | | |

=== Didsbury ===
Didsbury
| Party | Candidate | Votes | % | ±% |
|---|---|---|---|---|
| Liberal | E. D. Simon | uncontested | | |
| Liberal gain from Conservative | | Swing | | |

=== Exchange ===
Exchange
| Party | Candidate | Votes | % | ±% |
|---|---|---|---|---|
| Conservative | J. Makeague* | uncontested | | |
| Conservative hold | | Swing | | |

=== Gorton North ===
Gorton North
| Party | Candidate | Votes | % | ±% |
|---|---|---|---|---|
| Labour | T. Higginson* | uncontested | | |
| Labour hold | | Swing | | |

=== Gorton South ===
Gorton South
| Party | Candidate | Votes | % | ±% |
|---|---|---|---|---|
| Independent | T. R. Day* | uncontested | | |
| Independent hold | | Swing | | |

=== Harpurhey ===
Harpurhey
| Party | Candidate | Votes | % | ±% |
|---|---|---|---|---|
| Conservative | J. Hargreaves* | 1,913 | 44.2 | −11.0 |
| Labour | R. Bebbington | 1,374 | 31.7 | −13.1 |
| Liberal | C. Peach | 1,041 | 24.1 | N/A |
| Majority | | 539 | 12.5 | +2.1 |
| Turnout | | 4,328 | | |
| Conservative hold | | Swing | | |

=== Levenshulme North ===
Levenshulme North
| Party | Candidate | Votes | % | ±% |
|---|---|---|---|---|
| Conservative | F. Fenn* | uncontested | | |
| Conservative hold | | Swing | | |

=== Levenshulme South ===
Levenshulme South
| Party | Candidate | Votes | % | ±% |
|---|---|---|---|---|
| Independent | J. Harrison* | uncontested | | |
| Independent hold | | Swing | | |

=== Longsight ===
Longsight
| Party | Candidate | Votes | % | ±% |
|---|---|---|---|---|
| Conservative | W. Cundiff* | 1,120 | 62.3 | +8.0 |
| Labour | G. Hall | 679 | 37.7 | −8.0 |
| Majority | | 441 | 24.6 | +16.0 |
| Turnout | | 1,799 | | |
| Conservative hold | | Swing | | |

=== Medlock Street ===
Medlock Street
| Party | Candidate | Votes | % | ±% |
|---|---|---|---|---|
| Conservative | A. W. Chapman* | uncontested | | |
| Conservative hold | | Swing | | |

=== Miles Platting ===
Miles Platting
| Party | Candidate | Votes | % | ±% |
|---|---|---|---|---|
| Conservative | R. Chesters* | 1,531 | 58.8 | +11.7 |
| Labour | H. H. Laurie | 1,073 | 41.2 | −11.7 |
| Majority | | 458 | 17.6 | |
| Turnout | | 2,604 | | |
| Conservative hold | | Swing | | |

=== Moss Side East ===
Moss Side East
| Party | Candidate | Votes | % | ±% |
|---|---|---|---|---|
| Conservative | W. T. Dagnall* | 910 | 51.1 | +3.5 |
| English League for the Taxation of Land Values | A. H. Weller | 870 | 48.9 | N/A |
| Majority | | 40 | 2.2 | |
| Turnout | | 1,780 | | |
| Conservative hold | | Swing | | |

=== Moss Side West ===
Moss Side West
| Party | Candidate | Votes | % | ±% |
|---|---|---|---|---|
| Conservative | W. Flanagan* | uncontested | | |
| Conservative hold | | Swing | | |

=== New Cross ===
New Cross
| Party | Candidate | Votes | % | ±% |
|---|---|---|---|---|
| Conservative | A. Taylor* | 2,412 | 65.6 | +1.8 |
| Conservative | C. E. B. Russell | 2,122 | 57.7 | −6.1 |
| Liberal | T. P. Fyans | 1,408 | 38.3 | N/A |
| Majority | | 714 | 19.4 | |
| Turnout | | 3,675 | | |
| Conservative hold | | Swing | | |
| Conservative hold | | Swing | | |

=== Newton Heath ===
Newton Heath
| Party | Candidate | Votes | % | ±% |
|---|---|---|---|---|
| Conservative | J. A. Moston | 1,630 | 55.7 | +6.6 |
| Liberal | W. Butterworth* | 1,297 | 44.3 | −6.6 |
| Majority | | 333 | 11.4 | |
| Turnout | | 2,927 | | |
| Conservative gain from Liberal | | Swing | | |

=== Openshaw ===
Openshaw
| Party | Candidate | Votes | % | ±% |
|---|---|---|---|---|
| Labour | T. Cook* | 1,275 | 83.1 | +37.0 |
| British Socialist Party | W. Green | 260 | 16.9 | +12.7 |
| Majority | | 1,015 | 66.2 | |
| Turnout | | 1,535 | | |
| Labour hold | | Swing | | |

=== Oxford ===
Oxford
| Party | Candidate | Votes | % | ±% |
|---|---|---|---|---|
| Liberal | C. Behrens* | uncontested | | |
| Liberal hold | | Swing | | |

=== Rusholme ===
Rusholme
| Party | Candidate | Votes | % | ±% |
|---|---|---|---|---|
| Liberal | E. F. M. Susman* | uncontested | | |
| Liberal hold | | Swing | | |

=== St. Ann's ===
St. Ann's
| Party | Candidate | Votes | % | ±% |
|---|---|---|---|---|
| Conservative | J. G. Litton* | uncontested | | |
| Conservative hold | | Swing | | |

=== St. Clement's ===
St. Clement's
| Party | Candidate | Votes | % | ±% |
|---|---|---|---|---|
| Liberal | J. H. Helm* | 559 | 52.7 | −2.0 |
| Conservative | W. R. W. Murray | 501 | 47.3 | +2.0 |
| Majority | | 58 | 5.4 | −4.0 |
| Turnout | | 1,060 | | |
| Liberal hold | | Swing | | |

=== St. George's ===
St. George's
| Party | Candidate | Votes | % | ±% |
|---|---|---|---|---|
| Liberal | G. Oddy* | 1,310 | 79.3 | N/A |
| British Socialist Party | A. Mole | 341 | 20.7 | N/A |
| Majority | | 969 | 58.6 | N/A |
| Turnout | | 1,651 | | |
| Liberal hold | | Swing | | |

=== St. James' ===
St. James'
| Party | Candidate | Votes | % | ±% |
|---|---|---|---|---|
| Conservative | J. Hislop* | 319 | 51.2 | N/A |
| Liberal | W. Thomson | 304 | 48.8 | N/A |
| Majority | | 15 | 2.4 | N/A |
| Turnout | | 623 | | |
| Conservative hold | | Swing | | |

=== St. John's ===
St. John's
| Party | Candidate | Votes | % | ±% |
|---|---|---|---|---|
| Conservative | T. Foden | 376 | 50.8 | −0.7 |
| Independent | W. Robinow | 364 | 49.2 | N/A |
| Majority | | 12 | 1.6 | −1.4 |
| Turnout | | 740 | | |
| Conservative hold | | Swing | | |

=== St. Luke's ===
St. Luke's
| Party | Candidate | Votes | % | ±% |
|---|---|---|---|---|
| Conservative | J. Johnson* | uncontested | | |
| Conservative hold | | Swing | | |

=== St. Mark's ===
St. Mark's
| Party | Candidate | Votes | % | ±% |
|---|---|---|---|---|
| Liberal | R. Turner* | uncontested | | |
| Liberal hold | | Swing | | |

=== St. Michael's ===
St. Michael's
| Party | Candidate | Votes | % | ±% |
|---|---|---|---|---|
| Conservative | T. Boyle* | 1,136 | 50.3 | +3.0 |
| Liberal | J. Reilly | 1,124 | 49.7 | −3.0 |
| Majority | | 12 | 0.6 | |
| Turnout | | 2,260 | | |
| Conservative hold | | Swing | | |

=== Withington ===
Withington
| Party | Candidate | Votes | % | ±% |
|---|---|---|---|---|
| Conservative | H. Derwent Simpson* | uncontested | | |
| Conservative hold | | Swing | | |

== Aldermanic elections ==
=== Aldermanic election, 2 April 1913 ===
Caused by the death on 18 March 1913 of Alderman W. B. Pritchard (Liberal, elected as an alderman by the council on 9 November 1909).

In his place, Councillor John R. Smith (Conservative, Collegiate Church, elected 1 November 1898) was elected as an alderman by the council on 2 April 1913.

| Party | Alderman | Ward | Term expires |
|---|---|---|---|
| Conservative | John R. Smith | Collegiate Church | 1913 |

== By-elections between 1912 and 1913 ==
=== Collegiate Church, 23 January 1913 ===
Caused by the death of Councillor John Lowry (Conservative, Collegiate Church, elected 1 November 1899) on 6 January 1913.

Collegiate Church
| Party | Candidate | Votes | % | ±% |
|---|---|---|---|---|
| Conservative | T. R. Hewlett | 415 | 50.6 | −2.2 |
| Liberal | E. Barker | 405 | 49.4 | +2.2 |
| Majority | | 10 | 1.2 | −4.4 |
| Turnout | | 820 | | |
| Conservative hold | | Swing | | |

=== Collegiate Church, 15 April 1913 ===
Caused by the election as an alderman of Councillor J. R. Smith (Conservative, Collegiate Church, elected 1 November 1898) on 2 April 1913 following the death on 18 March 1913 of Alderman W. B. Pritchard (Liberal, elected as an alderman by the council on 9 November 1909).

Collegiate Church
| Party | Candidate | Votes | % | ±% |
|---|---|---|---|---|
| Conservative | J. Hill | 442 | 51.6 | −1.2 |
| Liberal | E. Barker | 415 | 48.4 | +1.2 |
| Majority | | 27 | 3.2 | −2.4 |
| Turnout | | 857 | | |
| Conservative hold | | Swing | | |
