= Thomas Carey =

Thomas or Tom Carey may refer to:

- Thomas Carey (Australian politician) (1830s–1884), Australian politician and surveyor
- Thomas Carey (baritone) (1931–2002), American opera singer
- Thomas Carey (cricketer) (1903–1966), American-born Irish cricketer and British colonial administrator
- Thomas Carey (English politician) (died 1634), second son of the 1st Earl of Monmouth, English Member of Parliament
- Thomas Godfrey Carey (1895–1902), Guernsey politician
- Tom Carey (footballer) (1941–2009), Australian rules footballer
- Tom Carey (shortstop) (1846–1906), 19th century baseball player
- Tom Carey (second baseman) (1906–1970), MLB infielder
- Tom Carey (rugby league), Australian rugby league player
- Tom Carey (NASCAR), NASCAR truck driver in 2000 NASCAR Craftsman Truck Series
- Tom Carey (sprinter), winner of the 60 yards at the 1946 USA Indoor Track and Field Championships
- Tom Carey, actor in Man in the Mirror: The Michael Jackson Story

== See also ==
- Thomas Cary (disambiguation)
- Thomas Kerry (disambiguation)
