= Hugh Lynas =

British trade unionist (1865–1938)

Hugh Lynas (1865 – 3 December 1938) was a British trade unionist.

== Biography ==
Born in 1865, in Glasgow, Lynas received just two years of elementary schooling. He became a labourer, and joined the National Union of Gasworkers and General Labourers. In March 1896, he was elected as secretary of its Sunderland District, this later becoming the union's Northern District. He was regarded as one of the union's most effective organisers, and by 1910 it had the third-highest membership of any in the union. In 1908, he persuaded the union to affiliated to the General Labourers' National Council. When the union merged into the new National Union of General and Municipal Workers, he retained his post, standing down in 1937.

Lynas served on the Sunderland School Board and Board of Guardians, and from 1919, was a magistrate. He died on 3 December 1938.

Trade union offices
Preceded by New position	Northern District Secretary of the National Union of General and Municipal Workers; 1924–1937	Succeeded by Jack Yarwood
