= John McKenzie (trade unionist) =

Scottish trade unionist (1885–1958)

John McKenzie (1885 – 1958) was a Scottish trade unionist.

McKenzie joined the National Union of Gasworkers and General Labourers and from 1910, he worked full-time for the union as a district organiser. In 1913, the union appointed him as its Scottish district secretary. He opposed the Red Clydeside movement, claiming that it was a conspiracy of craft unions, and that many people wished to work, but were prevented from doing so by mass pickets.

McKenzie retained the position when the union became part of the new National Union of General and Municipal Workers. He retired in 1946.

Trade union offices
Preceded by New position	Scottish District Secretary of the National Union of General and Municipal Workers; 1924–1946	Succeeded by William McGinniss
