= William E. Hopkin =

Welsh trade union leader

William Edward Hopkin (28 January 1888 – 23 September 1953) was a Welsh trade union leader.

Hopkin became active in the National Union of Gas Workers and General Labourers, and began working full-time for the union in 1911. He served with the Royal Navy during World War I, but returned to the union, and in 1920, was appointed as the secretary of its South Wales district. He remained in post when the union became part of the new National Union of General and Municipal Workers (NUGMW).

Hopkin served on the executive committee of the NUGMW until his retirement, and this included serving as chair of the union from 1949. He also served on the Welsh Regional Board for Industry and the executive of the South Wales Regional Council of Labour. In 1949, he was part of a Trades Union Congress delegation to the United States, tasked with studying methods of industrial production there.

In 1947, Hopkin was made an Officer of the Order of the British Empire, and in 1949 he became a magistrate. He retired in 1952, and died on 23 September 1953, at the age of 65.

Trade union offices
| Preceded by Thomas William Kerry | Chair of the National Union of General and Municipal Workers; 1949–1952 | Succeeded by Jack Cooper |
