= National Union of General Workers (UK) =

Former trade union of the United Kingdom

- Merged into: National Union of General and Municipal Workers
- Founded: 1889
- Dissolved: 1924
- Headquarters: 28 Tavistock Square, London
- Location: United Kingdom
- Members: 39,805 (1907); 196,090 (1924)
- Key people: Will Thorne, General Secretary
- Affiliations: TUC, NTWF, Labour

The National Union of General Workers (NUGW) was an early general union in the United Kingdom, the most important general union of its era.

== History ==
The union was founded in 1889 as the National Union of Gas Workers and General Labourers by Will Thorne, Ben Tillett and William Byford, following lay offs at Beckton gas works. Thorne was elected as the General Secretary, a post he held throughout the life of the union, and successfully argued that the organisation should campaign for an eight-hour working day, rather than an increase in wages. This demand was quickly won, and membership soon rose to over 20,000.

While the union organised members across the UK, its main areas of strength were London and Lancashire. In London, Thorne was its best-known figure, followed by Pete Curran, Arthur Hayday, Jack Jones and Harry Picard, while in Lancashire its main figures were J. R. Clynes, Charles Dukes, Fleming Eccles and Arthur Seabury. It also had significant numbers of members in the north east, organised by Hugh Lynas, and in Scotland, where it was organised by John McKenzie. Its largest section of members worked in engineering, followed by gas workers, electricity supply, shipyard workers in the south of England and in Scotland. Other industries in which it had a significant membership included the metal trades in Sheffield and Birmingham, aluminium, asbestos and cement works, brickmaking, quarrying, boxmaking, chemicals, rubber, leather, and food and drink manufacturing.

In 1916, the organisation renamed itself the "National Union of General Workers", merging with the Amalgamated Union of Machine and General Labourers. Further mergers followed, principally with the British Labour Amalgamation, the Amalgamated Society of Gas, Municipal and General Workers, the Amalgamated Enginemen, Cranemen, Boilermen, Firemen and Wire Rope Workers Union and the National Federation of Women Workers. This last merger was particularly significant, as it brought 30,000 women into the union.

Unlike many other unions, the NUGW only had a small staff at its headquarters, consisting of Clynes, Jones, Thorne and Will Sherwood, later joined by Margaret Bondfield from the National Union of Women Workers.

In 1924, the union joined with the National Amalgamated Union of Labour and the Municipal Employees Association to form the National Union of General and Municipal Workers. Much of the leadership of the new union came from the NUGW, which adopted its districts. Eccles, R. H. Farrah, Hayday, William E. Hopkin, Tom Hurley, Lynas, McKenzie, Walt Wood and S. J. Wright all continued in post as district secretaries, Thorne continued as general secretary, and Clynes as president, while Bondfield, Jones and Sherwood were appointed as assistant general secretaries.

== Election results ==
The union sponsored Labour Party candidates in numerous Parliamentary elections, several of whom won election.

Election	Constituency	Candidate	Votes	Percentage	Position
1900 general election	West Ham South	Will Thorne	4,439	44.2	2
1906 general election	Jarrow	Peter Francis Curran	5,093	38.8	2
1906 general election	West Ham South	Will Thorne	10,210	67.2	1
1907 by-election	Jarrow	Pete Curran	4,698	33.0	1
1910 Jan general election	Jarrow	Pete Curran	4,818	33.5	2
1910 Jan general election	West Ham South	Will Thorne	11,791	63.1	1
1910 Dec general election	West Ham South	Will Thorne	9,508	66.4	1
1918 general election	Bolton	Robert Tootill	unopposed	N/A	1
1918 general election	Carlisle	Ernest Lowthian	4,736	33.2	2
1918 general election	The Hartlepools	Will Sherwood	4,733	18.6	3
1918 general election	Manchester Platting	John Robert Clynes	unopposed	N/A	1
1918 general election	Nottingham West	Arthur Hayday	7,286	56.8	1
1918 general election	Plaistow	Will Thorne	12,156	94.9	1
1918 general election	Rutland and Stamford	Fleming Eccles	7,639	46.4	2
1922 general election	Darlington	Will Sherwood	9,048	33.8	2
1922 general election	Manchester Platting	J. R. Clynes	15,683	48.5	1
1922 general election	Northampton	Margaret Bondfield	14,498	37.9	2
1922 general election	Northwich	John Williams	13,006	45.8	2
1922 general election	Nottingham West	Arthur Hayday	10,787	49.0	1
1922 general election	Plaistow	Will Thorne	12,321	63.3	1
1922 general election	Rutland and Stamford	Fleming Eccles	7,236	32.9	2
1922 general election	Silvertown	Jack Jones	11,874	73.1	1
1923 by-election	Darlington	Will Sherwood	11,271	43.4	2
1923 general election	Bolton	Fleming Eccles	21,045	15.6	5
1923 general election	Darlington	Will Sherwood	9,284	33.6	2
1923 general election	Manchester Platting	J. R. Clynes	17,078	54.8	1
1923 general election	Northampton	Margaret Bondfield	15,556	40.5	1
1923 general election	Nottingham West	Arthur Hayday	12,366	62.7	1
1923 general election	Plaistow	Will Thorne	13,638	74.6	1
1923 general election	Silvertown	Jack Jones	12,777	81.3	1

== Presidents ==
1889: Mark Hutchins
1891: Will Watkinson
1894: Pete Curran
1910: J. E. Smith
1912: J. R. Clynes
