= Fleming Eccles =

British socialist politician and trade unionist

Fleming Eccles (1871 or 1872 – March 1925) was a British socialist politician and trade unionist.

Born in Blackburn, Eccles worked as a weaver and was promoted to become an overlooker. He also took an interest in trade unionism, and became a branch secretary for the National Union of Gas Workers and General Labourers.

Eccles was also a member of the Social Democratic Federation (SDF), serving as financial secretary of one of its Blackburn branches, and also on its national Executive Committee. Through this became active in the Labour Representation Committee, for which he represented on Blackburn Town Council in 1903, and also to the local Board of Guardians. He stood down from his elected positions in 1906 as he became the Gas Workers' assistant district secretary for Lancashire, succeeding J. R. Clynes as district secretary in 1917.

Eccles stood in Rutland and Stamford at the 1918 general election, taking 46.4% of the vote, and again in 1922, where his vote dropped to 32.9%. At the 1923 general election he instead stood in Bolton. This was a two-seat constituency, and his running mate Albert Law topped the poll, but Eccles could only take fifth place and again failed to be elected. By this time, he was active in the reconstituted SDF, formed by supporters of British involvement in World War I.

Eccles' son, Tom, followed him into trade unionism, as did his grandson, Jack Eccles.

Trade union offices
Preceded by J. R. Clynes	Lancashire District Secretary of the National Union of General Workers; 1917–1924	Succeeded by Position abolished
Preceded by New position	Lancashire District Secretary of the National Union of General and Municipal Workers; 1924–1925	Succeeded by Charles Dukes
