= Rei Alfred Deakin Carter =

British politician

Rei Alfred Deakin Carter (3 December 1856 – 4 February 1938) was Conservative MP for Manchester Withington. He had been an alderman of the city of Manchester since 1908.

He won the seat when it was created in 1918, but stood down in 1922.
