= St. George's (Manchester ward) =

- Ward
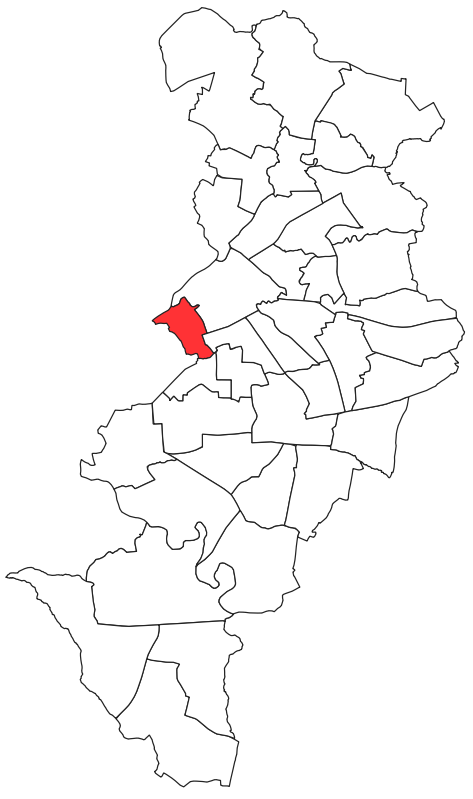
- St. George's ward (1954) within Manchester

- Coat of arms
- Country: United Kingdom
- Constituent country: England
- Region: North West England
- County borough: Manchester
- Created: December 1838
- Named for: St. George's

Government
  - Type: Unicameral
  - Body: Manchester City Council
- UK Parliamentary Constituency: Manchester Exchange

St. George's was an electoral division of Manchester City Council which was represented from 1838 until 1971. It covered a part of Hulme.

== Overview ==
St. George's ward was one of the fifteen municipal wards created in 1838, when the Manchester Borough Council was granted a Charter of Incorporation under the provisions of the Municipal Corporations Act 1835.

Initially, the ward covered the western half of Hulme township, which had been absorbed into Manchester by the borough's Charter of Incorporation. Its original boundaries remained in place until 1919, when an area to the east of Radnor Street was transferred from the ward to the Medlock Street ward, these boundaries were largely unaffected by a further revision in 1950. The ward was abolished in 1971, with most of its area being transferred to the new Hulme and Moss Side wards.

From 1838 until 1885, the ward formed part of the Manchester Parliamentary constituency. From 1885 until 1918, it was part of the Manchester South West Parliamentary constituency. From 1918 until 1950, it was part of the Manchester Hulme Parliamentary constituency. From 1950 until its abolition, it was part of the Manchester Exchange Parliamentary constituency.

== Councillors ==
Election	Councillor	Councillor	Councillor
1838	Henry Wadkin (Lib)	George Smith (Lib)	William Nicholson (Lib)
1839	Henry Wadkin (Lib)	George Smith (Lib)	William Nicholson (Lib)
1840	Henry Wadkin (Lib)	David Holt (Lib)	William Nicholson (Lib)
1841	Henry Wadkin (Lib)	David Holt (Lib)	William Nicholson (Lib)
1842	Benjamin Hampson (Lib)	Henry Wadkin (Lib)	Horatio Smith (Lib)
1843	Benjamin Hampson (Lib)	Thomas Malkin (Lib)	Horatio Smith (Lib)
1844	Frederick Watson (Lib)	Thomas Malkin (Lib)	Horatio Smith (Lib)
1845	Frederick Watson (Lib)	Thomas Malkin (Lib)	John Standring (Lib)
(1845–1872)
1872	W. Mather (Lib)	J. Derbyshire (Lib)	T. Schofield (Lib)
1873	W. Mather (Lib)	W. Birch (Lib)	T. Schofield (Lib)
1874	W. Mather (Lib)	W. Birch (Lib)	T. Schofield (Lib)
1875	W. Mather (Lib)	W. Birch (Lib)	T. Schofield (Lib)
1876	W. Mather (Lib)	R. B. Goldsworthy (Lib)	T. Schofield (Lib)
1877	W. Mather (Lib)	R. Lovatt Reade (Con)	T. Schofield (Lib)
1878	W. Mather (Lib)	R. Lovatt Reade (Con)	T. Schofield (Lib)
1879	W. Mather (Lib)	R. Lovatt Reade (Con)	T. Schofield (Lib)
1880	R. B. Goldsworthy (Lib)	R. Lovatt Reade (Con)	T. Schofield (Lib)
1881	R. B. Goldsworthy (Lib)	R. Lovatt Reade (Con)	T. Schofield (Lib)
1882	R. B. Goldsworthy (Lib)	R. Lovatt Reade (Con)	T. Schofield (Lib)
1883	R. B. Goldsworthy (Lib)	R. Lovatt Reade (Con)	R. Gibson (Lib)
1884	R. B. Goldsworthy (Lib)	R. Lovatt Reade (Con)	R. Gibson (Lib)
1885	R. B. Goldsworthy (Lib)	R. Lovatt Reade (Con)	R. Gibson (Lib)
1886	R. B. Goldsworthy (Lib)	R. Lovatt Reade (Con)	R. Gibson (Lib)
1887	R. B. Goldsworthy (Lib)	R. Lovatt Reade (Con)	R. Gibson (Lib)
1888	R. B. Goldsworthy (Lib)	R. Lovatt Reade (Con)	R. Gibson (Lib)
April 1889	R. B. Goldsworthy (Lib)	J. Norris (Lib)	R. Gibson (Lib)
1889	J. Tatton (Lib)	J. Norris (Lib)	R. Gibson (Lib)
1890	J. Tatton (Lib)	J. Norris (Lib)	R. Gibson (Lib)
May 1891	R. Carhart (Lib)	J. Norris (Lib)	R. Gibson (Lib)
1891	R. Carhart (Lib)	J. Norris (Lib)	R. Gibson (Lib)
1892	R. Carhart (Lib)	J. Norris (Lib)	R. Gibson (Lib)
July 1893	R. Carhart (Lib)	J. Norris (Lib)	R. A. S. Daly (Con)
1893	R. Carhart (Lib)	J. Norris (Lib)	R. A. S. Daly (Con)
September 1894	J. C. Nichol (Con)	J. Norris (Lib)	R. A. S. Daly (Con)
1894	J. C. Nichol (Con)	S. W. Royse (Con)	R. A. S. Daly (Con)
1895	J. C. Nichol (Con)	S. W. Royse (Con)	R. A. S. Daly (Con)
1896	J. C. Nichol (Con)	S. W. Royse (Con)	R. A. S. Daly (Con)
1897	J. C. Nichol (Con)	W. Maben (SDF)	R. A. S. Daly (Con)
1898	J. Johnston (ILP)	W. Maben (SDF)	R. A. S. Daly (Con)
1899	J. Johnston (ILP)	W. Maben (SDF)	R. A. S. Daly (Con)
1900	J. Johnston (Lab)	W. Maben (SDF)	R. A. S. Daly (Con)
January 1901	J. Johnston (Lab)	F. W. Maxwell (Lib)	R. A. S. Daly (Con)
1901	W. Kay (Con)	F. W. Maxwell (Lib)	R. A. S. Daly (Con)
1902	W. Kay (Con)	F. W. Maxwell (Lib)	A. Craven (Con)
1903	W. Kay (Con)	J. A. Mackay (Con)	A. Craven (Con)
1904	W. Kay (Con)	J. A. Mackay (Con)	A. Craven (Con)
1905	W. Kay (Con)	J. A. Mackay (Con)	A. Craven (Con)
1906	W. Kay (Con)	J. H. Swales (Con)	A. Craven (Con)
1907	W. Kay (Con)	J. H. Swales (Con)	A. Craven (Con)
1908	W. Kay (Con)	J. H. Swales (Con)	A. Craven (Con)
1909	W. Kay (Con)	G. Oddy (Lib)	A. Craven (Con)
September 1910	W. Kay (Con)	G. Oddy (Lib)	J. H. Swales (Con)
1910	W. Kay (Con)	G. Oddy (Lib)	J. H. Swales (Con)
1911	W. Kay (Con)	G. Oddy (Lib)	J. H. Swales (Con)
1912	W. Kay (Con)	G. Oddy (Lib)	J. H. Swales (Con)
1913	W. Kay (Con)	G. Oddy (Lib)	J. H. Swales (Con)
1914	W. Kay (Con)	G. Oddy (Lib)	J. H. Swales (Con)
March 1915	L. D. Kirkpatrick (Con)	G. Oddy (Lib)	J. H. Swales (Con)
1919	L. D. Kirkpatrick (Con)	G. Oddy (Lib)	J. H. Swales (Con)
1920	C. A. Toyn (Con)	G. Oddy (Lib)	J. H. Swales (Con)
1921	C. A. Toyn (Con)	G. Oddy (Lib)	J. H. Swales (Con)
1922	C. A. Toyn (Con)	G. Oddy (Lib)	J. H. Swales (Con)
February 1923	C. A. Toyn (Con)	G. Oddy (Lib)	C. Maxwell (Con)
1923	C. A. Toyn (Con)	G. Oddy (Lib)	C. Maxwell (Con)
1924	C. A. Toyn (Con)	G. Oddy (Lib)	R. Taylor (Con)
1925	C. A. Toyn (Con)	G. Oddy (Lib)	R. Taylor (Con)
1926	J. G. Clapham (Lab)	G. Oddy (Lib)	R. Taylor (Con)
1927	J. G. Clapham (Lab)	G. Oddy (Lib)	F. C. Mason (Lab)
November 1927	J. G. Clapham (Lab)	E. Hope (Lab)	F. C. Mason (Lab)
1928	J. G. Clapham (Lab)	E. Hope (Lab)	F. C. Mason (Lab)
1929	J. G. Clapham (Lab)	E. Hope (Lab)	F. C. Mason (Lab)
September 1930	J. G. Clapham (Lab)	E. Hope (ILP)	F. C. Mason (Lab)
1930	J. G. Clapham (Lab)	E. Hope (ILP)	A. W. L. Smith (Con)
1931	J. G. Clapham (Lab)	A. Todd (Lib)	A. W. L. Smith (Con)
1932	J. G. Clapham (Lab)	A. Todd (Lib)	A. W. L. Smith (Con)
1933	J. G. Clapham (Lab)	A. Todd (Lib)	C. Beamand (Lab)
1934	J. G. Clapham (Lab)	A. Horan (Lab)	C. Beamand (Lab)
1935	J. G. Clapham (Lab)	A. Horan (Lab)	C. Beamand (Lab)
1936	J. G. Clapham (Lab)	A. Horan (Lab)	C. Beamand (Lab)
1937	J. G. Clapham (Lab)	R. B. Breeze (Con)	C. Beamand (Lab)
1938	J. H. Kearns (Con)	R. B. Breeze (Con)	C. Beamand (Lab)
1945	J. H. Kearns (Con)	R. B. Breeze (Con)	R. E. Thomas (Lab)
1946	J. H. Kearns (Con)	C. Gordon (Lab)	R. E. Thomas (Lab)
1947	J. H. Kearns (Con)	C. Gordon (Lab)	R. E. Thomas (Lab)
1949	J. H. Kearns (Con)	C. Gordon (Lab)	R. E. Thomas (Lab)
1950	J. H. Kearns (Con)	A. S. Reid (Lab)	R. E. Thomas (Lab)
1951	K. Collis (Lab)	A. S. Reid (Lab)	R. E. Thomas (Lab)
1952	K. Collis (Lab)	A. S. Reid (Lab)	R. E. Thomas (Lab)
1953	K. Collis (Lab)	G. Mann (Lab)	R. E. Thomas (Lab)
1954	K. Collis (Lab)	G. Mann (Lab)	R. E. Thomas (Lab)
1956	K. Collis (Lab)	G. Mann (Lab)	R. E. Thomas (Lab)
1956	K. Collis (Lab)	G. Mann (Lab)	R. E. Thomas (Lab)
April 1957	K. Collis (Lab)	G. Mann (Lab)	E. Mellor (Lab)
1957	K. Collis (Lab)	G. Mann (Lab)	E. Mellor (Lab)
1958	K. Collis (Lab)	G. Mann (Lab)	E. Mellor (Lab)
1959	K. Collis (Lab)	G. Mann (Lab)	E. Mellor (Lab)
1960	K. Collis (Lab)	G. Mann (Lab)	E. Mellor (Lab)
1961	K. Collis (Lab)	G. Mann (Lab)	E. Mellor (Lab)
1962	K. Collis (Lab)	G. Mann (Lab)	E. Mellor (Lab)
1963	K. Collis (Lab)	G. Mann (Lab)	E. Mellor (Lab)
1964	K. Collis (Lab)	G. Mann (Lab)	E. Mellor (Lab)
1965	K. Collis (Lab)	G. Mann (Lab)	E. Mellor (Lab)
1966	K. Collis (Lab)	G. Mann (Lab)	E. Mellor (Lab)
1967	K. Collis (Lab)	G. Mann (Lab)	E. Mellor (Lab)
1967	K. Collis (Lab)	G. Mann (Lab)	E. Mellor (Lab)
1969	K. Collis (Lab)	G. Mann (Lab)	E. Mellor (Lab)
1970	K. Collis (Lab)	G. Mann (Lab)	E. Mellor (Lab)

== Elections ==
=== Elections in 1830s ===
==== December 1838 ====
1838 (3 vacancies)
Party	Candidate	Votes	%	±%
Liberal	Henry Wadkin	137	100.0	
Liberal	George Smith	136	99.3	
Liberal	William Nicholson	135	98.5	
Turnout		137		
Liberal win (new seat)				
Liberal win (new seat)				
Liberal win (new seat)				

==== November 1839 ====
1839
Party	Candidate	Votes	%	±%
Liberal	William Nicholson*	uncontested		
Liberal hold		Swing		

=== Elections in 1840s ===
==== November 1840 ====
1840
Party	Candidate	Votes	%	±%
Liberal	David Holt	uncontested		
Liberal hold		Swing		

==== November 1841 ====
1841
Party	Candidate	Votes	%	±%
Liberal	Henry Wadkin*	uncontested		
Liberal hold		Swing		

==== November 1842 ====
1842 (2 vacancies)
Party	Candidate	Votes	%	±%
Liberal	Horatio Smith	uncontested		
Liberal	Benjamin Hampson	uncontested		
Liberal hold		Swing		
Liberal hold		Swing		

==== November 1843 ====
1843
Party	Candidate	Votes	%	±%
Liberal	Thomas Malkin	uncontested		
Liberal hold		Swing		

==== November 1844 ====
1844
Party	Candidate	Votes	%	±%
Liberal	Frederick Watson	uncontested		
Liberal hold		Swing		

==== November 1845 ====
1845
Party	Candidate	Votes	%	±%
Liberal	John Standring	131	78.0	N/A
Residents	William Cottrell	37	22.0	N/A
Majority		94	56.0	N/A
Turnout		168		
Liberal hold		Swing		

=== Elections in 1870s ===
==== November 1872 ====
1872
Party	Candidate	Votes	%	±%
Liberal	T. Schofield*	uncontested		
Liberal hold		Swing		

==== November 1873 ====
1873
Party	Candidate	Votes	%	±%
Liberal	W. Birch	2,262	62.2	N/A
Conservative	S. Latham	1,377	37.8	N/A
Majority		885	24.4	N/A
Turnout		3,639		
Liberal hold		Swing		

==== November 1874 ====
1874
Party	Candidate	Votes	%	±%
Liberal	W. Mather*	uncontested		
Liberal hold		Swing		

==== November 1875 ====
1875
Party	Candidate	Votes	%	±%
Liberal	T. Schofield*	uncontested		
Liberal hold		Swing		

==== November 1876 ====
1876
Party	Candidate	Votes	%	±%
Liberal	R. B. Goldsworthy*	1,534	50.1	N/A
Conservative	R. Lovatt Reade	1,532	49.9	N/A
Majority		2	0.2	N/A
Turnout		3,066		
Liberal hold		Swing		

==== November 1877 ====
1877
Party	Candidate	Votes	%	±%
Liberal	W. Mather*	uncontested		
Liberal hold		Swing		

==== November 1878 ====
1878
Party	Candidate	Votes	%	±%
Liberal	T. Schofield*	uncontested		
Liberal hold		Swing		

==== November 1879 ====
1879
Party	Candidate	Votes	%	±%
Conservative	R. Lovatt Reade*	uncontested		
Conservative hold		Swing		

=== Elections in 1880s ===
==== November 1880 ====
1880
Party	Candidate	Votes	%	±%
Liberal	R. B. Goldsworthy*	uncontested		
Liberal hold		Swing		

==== November 1881 ====
1881
Party	Candidate	Votes	%	±%
Liberal	T. Schofield*	uncontested		
Liberal hold		Swing		

==== November 1882 ====
1882
Party	Candidate	Votes	%	±%
Conservative	R. Lovatt Reade*	uncontested		
Conservative hold		Swing		

==== November 1883 ====
1883
Party	Candidate	Votes	%	±%
Liberal	R. B. Goldsworthy*	uncontested		
Liberal hold		Swing		

==== November 1884 ====
1884
Party	Candidate	Votes	%	±%
Liberal	R. Gibson*	1,786	58.4	N/A
Conservative	P. Gregory	1,272	41.6	N/A
Majority		514	16.8	N/A
Turnout		3,058		
Liberal hold		Swing		

==== November 1885 ====
1885
Party	Candidate	Votes	%	±%
Conservative	R. Lovatt Reade*	uncontested		
Conservative hold		Swing		

==== November 1886 ====
1886
Party	Candidate	Votes	%	±%
Liberal	R. B. Goldsworthy*	2,623	53.8	N/A
Conservative	J. Wainwright	2,248	46.2	N/A
Majority		375	7.6	N/A
Turnout		4,871		
Liberal hold		Swing		

==== November 1887 ====
1887
Party	Candidate	Votes	%	±%
Liberal	R. Gibson*	uncontested		
Liberal hold		Swing		

==== November 1888 ====
1888
Party	Candidate	Votes	%	±%
Conservative	R. Lovatt Reade*	uncontested		
Conservative hold		Swing		

==== April 1889 (by-election) ====
By-election: 1 April 1889
Party	Candidate	Votes	%	±%
Liberal	J. Norris	2,297	63.0	N/A
Conservative	J. Long	1,351	37.0	N/A
Majority		946	26.0	N/A
Turnout		2,602		
Liberal gain from Conservative		Swing		

==== November 1889 ====
1889
Party	Candidate	Votes	%	±%
Liberal	J. Tatton	1,987	59.5	N/A
Independent	A. Alsop	1,350	40.5	N/A
Majority		637	19.0	N/A
Turnout		3,337		
Liberal hold		Swing		

=== Elections in 1890s ===
==== November 1890 ====
1890
Party	Candidate	Votes	%	±%
Liberal	R. Gibson*	uncontested		
Liberal hold		Swing		

==== May 1891 (by-election) ====
By-election: 29 May 1891
Party	Candidate	Votes	%	±%
Liberal	R. Carhart	1,757	60.9	N/A
Conservative	W. Deakin	1,130	39.1	N/A
Majority		627	21.8	N/A
Turnout		2,887		
Liberal hold		Swing		

==== November 1891 ====
1891
Party	Candidate	Votes	%	±%
Liberal	J. Norris*	uncontested		
Liberal hold		Swing		

==== November 1892 ====
1892
Party	Candidate	Votes	%	±%
Liberal	R. Carhart*	1,859	81.5	N/A
Palace of Varieties	J. Waddington	421	18.5	N/A
Majority		1,438	63.0	N/A
Turnout		2,280		
Liberal hold		Swing		

==== July 1893 (by-election) ====
By-election: 5 July 1893
Party	Candidate	Votes	%	±%
Conservative	R. A. S. Daly	1,528	47.3	N/A
Liberal	F. Smallman	959	29.7	−51.8
Ind. Labour Party	R. Anderson	745	23.0	N/A
Majority		569	17.6	
Turnout		3,232		
Conservative gain from Liberal		Swing		

==== November 1893 ====
1893
Party	Candidate	Votes	%	±%
Conservative	R. A. S. Daly*	1,775	62.5	N/A
Ind. Labour Party	R. Anderson	1,066	37.5	N/A
Majority		709	25.0	
Turnout		2,841		
Conservative hold		Swing		

==== September 1894 (by-election) ====
By-election: 21 September 1894
Party	Candidate	Votes	%	±%
Conservative	J. C. Nichol	1,546	56.2	−6.3
Ind. Labour Party	R. Anderson	1,206	43.8	+6.3
Majority		340	12.4	−12.6
Turnout		2,752		
Conservative gain from Liberal		Swing		

==== November 1894 ====
1894
Party	Candidate	Votes	%	±%
Conservative	S. W. Royse	1,826	50.6	−11.9
Liberal	P. Mooney	1,166	32.3	N/A
Ind. Labour Party	R. Anderson	615	17.1	−20.4
Majority		660	18.3	−6.7
Turnout		3,607		
Conservative gain from Liberal		Swing		

==== November 1895 ====
1895
Party	Candidate	Votes	%	±%
Conservative	J. C. Nichol*	1,579	75.3	+24.7
Social Democratic Federation	W. Skivington	519	24.7	N/A
Majority		1,060	50.6	+32.3
Turnout		2,098		
Conservative hold		Swing		

==== November 1896 ====
1896
Party	Candidate	Votes	%	±%
Conservative	R. A. S. Daly*	1,208	46.4	−28.9
Social Democratic Federation	W. Maben	1,191	45.8	+21.1
Independent	D. Mounsey	203	7.8	N/A
Majority		17	0.6	−50.0
Turnout		2,602		
Conservative hold		Swing		

==== November 1897 ====
1897
Party	Candidate	Votes	%	±%
Social Democratic Federation	W. Maben	1,798	53.3	+7.5
Conservative	S. W. Royse*	1,575	46.7	+0.3
Majority		223	6.6	
Turnout		3,373		
Social Democratic Federation gain from Conservative		Swing		

==== November 1898 ====
1898
Party	Candidate	Votes	%	±%
Ind. Labour Party	J. Johnston	1,595	54.7	N/A
Conservative	J. C. Nichol*	1,322	45.3	−1.4
Majority		273	9.4	
Turnout		2,917		
Ind. Labour Party gain from Conservative		Swing		

==== November 1899 ====
1899
Party	Candidate	Votes	%	±%
Conservative	R. A. S. Daly*	1,336	50.1	+4.8
Liberal	F. W. Maxwell	1,333	49.9	N/A
Majority		3	0.2	
Turnout		2,669		
Conservative hold		Swing		

=== Elections in 1900s ===
==== November 1900 ====
1900
Party	Candidate	Votes	%	±%
Social Democratic Federation	W. Maben*	uncontested		
Social Democratic Federation hold		Swing		

==== January 1901 (by-election) ====
By-election: 22 January 1901
Party	Candidate	Votes	%	±%
Liberal	F. W. Maxwell	1,669	61.2	N/A
Conservative	P. H. Jordan	1,060	38.8	N/A
Majority		609	22.4	N/A
Turnout		2,729		
Liberal gain from Social Democratic Federation		Swing		

==== November 1901 ====
1901
Party	Candidate	Votes	%	±%
Conservative	W. Kay	1,613	51.2	N/A
Labour	J. Johnston*	1,536	48.8	N/A
Majority		77	2.4	N/A
Turnout		3,149		
Conservative gain from Labour		Swing		

==== November 1902 ====
1902
Party	Candidate	Votes	%	±%
Conservative	A. Craven	1,925	64.1	+12.9
Liberal	F. H. Worswick	1,076	35.9	N/A
Majority		849	28.2	+25.8
Turnout		3,631		
Conservative hold		Swing		

==== November 1903 ====
1903
Party	Candidate	Votes	%	±%
Conservative	J. A. Mackay	1,467	51.5	−12.6
Liberal	J. Green	1,383	48.5	+12.6
Majority		84	3.0	−25.2
Turnout		2,850		
Conservative gain from Liberal		Swing		

==== November 1904 ====
1904
Party	Candidate	Votes	%	±%
Conservative	W. Kay*	1,804	58.4	+6.9
Liberal	T. Corrigan	837	27.1	−21.4
Labour	R. Whitehead	449	14.5	N/A
Majority		967	31.3	+28.3
Turnout		3,090		
Conservative hold		Swing		

==== November 1905 ====
1905
Party	Candidate	Votes	%	±%
Conservative	A. Craven*	uncontested		
Conservative hold		Swing		

==== November 1906 ====
1906
Party	Candidate	Votes	%	±%
Conservative	J. H. Swales	1,229	42.7	N/A
Liberal	T. Kennaugh	1,138	39.5	N/A
Labour	T. A. Flynn	514	17.8	N/A
Majority		91	3.2	N/A
Turnout		2,881		
Conservative hold		Swing		

==== November 1907 ====
1907
Party	Candidate	Votes	%	±%
Conservative	W. Kay*	2,264	74.3	+31.6
Liberal	M. Ashton	785	25.7	−13.8
Majority		1,479	48.6	+45.4
Turnout		3,049		
Conservative hold		Swing		

==== November 1908 ====
1908
Party	Candidate	Votes	%	±%
Conservative	A. Craven*	1,640	52.2	−22.1
Liberal	G. Oddy	1,504	47.8	+22.1
Majority		136	4.4	−44.2
Turnout		3,144		
Conservative hold		Swing		

==== November 1909 ====
1909
Party	Candidate	Votes	%	±%
Liberal	G. Oddy	1,678	50.1	+2.3
Conservative	J. H. Swales*	1,673	49.9	−2.3
Majority		5	0.2	
Turnout		3,351		
Liberal gain from Conservative		Swing		

=== Elections in 1910s ===
==== September 1910 (by-election) ====
By-election: 19 September 1910
Party	Candidate	Votes	%	±%
Conservative	J. H. Swales	1,668	54.6	+4.7
Liberal	T. Kennaugh	1,389	45.4	−4.7
Majority		279	9.2	
Turnout		3,057		
Conservative hold		Swing		

==== November 1910 ====
1910
Party	Candidate	Votes	%	±%
Conservative	W. Kay*	1,576	60.3	+10.4
Labour	F. Lowe	1,038	39.7	N/A
Majority		538	20.6	
Turnout		2,614		
Conservative hold		Swing		

==== November 1911 ====
1911
Party	Candidate	Votes	%	±%
Conservative	J. H. Swales*	uncontested		
Conservative hold		Swing		

==== November 1912 ====
1912
Party	Candidate	Votes	%	±%
Liberal	G. Oddy*	1,310	79.3	N/A
British Socialist Party	A. Mole	341	20.7	N/A
Majority		969	58.6	N/A
Turnout		1,651		
Liberal hold		Swing		

==== November 1913 ====
1913
Party	Candidate	Votes	%	±%
Conservative	W. Kay*	1,510	76.7	N/A
British Socialist Party	A. Mole	459	23.3	+2.6
Majority		1,051	53.4	
Turnout		1,969		
Conservative hold		Swing		

==== November 1914 ====
1914
Party	Candidate	Votes	%	±%
Conservative	J. H. Swales*	uncontested		
Conservative hold		Swing		

==== March 1915 (by-election) ====
By-election: 16 March 1915
Party	Candidate	Votes	%	±%
Conservative	L. D. Kirkpatrick	uncontested		
Conservative hold		Swing		

==== November 1919 ====
1919 (new boundaries)
Party	Candidate	Votes	%	±%
Liberal	G. Oddy*	1,657	60.5	
Conservative	C. A. Toyn	1,081	39.5	
Majority		576	21.0	
Turnout		2,738	25.6	
Liberal hold		Swing		

=== Elections in 1920s ===
==== November 1920 ====
1920
Party	Candidate	Votes	%	±%
Conservative	C. A. Toyn	2,209	44.3	+4.8
Labour	C. Beamand	1,535	30.8	N/A
Liberal	E. I. Booth	1,238	24.9	−35.6
Majority		674	13.5	
Turnout		4,982	36.8	+11.2
Conservative hold		Swing		

==== November 1921 ====
1921
Party	Candidate	Votes	%	±%
Conservative	J. H. Swales*	3,613	74.3	+30.0
Independent	S. Finnigan	1,250	25.7	N/A
Majority		2,363	48.6	+35.1
Turnout		4,982	44.6	+7.8
Conservative hold		Swing		

==== November 1922 ====
1922
Party	Candidate	Votes	%	±%
Liberal	G. Oddy*	uncontested		
Liberal hold		Swing		

==== February 1923 (by-election) ====
By-election: 12 February 1923
Party	Candidate	Votes	%	±%
Conservative	C. Maxwell	uncontested		
Conservative hold		Swing		

==== November 1923 ====
1923
Party	Candidate	Votes	%	±%
Conservative	C. A. Toyn*	2,524	44.5	N/A
Labour	J. W. O'Neill	1,856	32.7	N/A
Liberal	A. Todd	1,289	22.8	N/A
Majority		668	11.8	N/A
Turnout		5,669		
Conservative hold		Swing		

==== November 1924 ====
1924
Party	Candidate	Votes	%	±%
Conservative	R. Taylor	2,309	39.7	−4.8
Labour	C. Beamand	2,294	39.5	+6.8
Liberal	A. Todd	1,211	20.8	−2.0
Majority		15	0.2	−11.6
Turnout		5,814		
Conservative hold		Swing		

==== November 1925 ====
1925
Party	Candidate	Votes	%	±%
Liberal	G. Oddy*	2,530	50.8	+30.0
Labour	J. G. Clapham	2,449	49.2	+9.7
Majority		81	1.6	
Turnout		4,979	42.2	
Liberal hold		Swing		

==== November 1926 ====
1926
Party	Candidate	Votes	%	±%
Labour	J. G. Clapham	3,137	58.0	+8.8
Conservative	C. A. Toyn*	2,276	42.0	N/A
Majority		861	16.0	
Turnout		5,413	45.7	+3.5
Labour gain from Conservative		Swing		

==== November 1927 ====
1927
Party	Candidate	Votes	%	±%
Labour	F. C. Mason	2,645	49.1	−8.9
Conservative	R. Taylor*	1,600	29.7	−12.3
Liberal	A. Todd	854	15.7	N/A
Prohibitionist	J. Rochford	285	5.3	N/A
Majority		1,045	19.4	+3.4
Turnout		5,384	46.6	+0.9
Labour gain from Conservative		Swing		

==== November 1927 (by-election) ====
By-election: 22 November 1927
Party	Candidate	Votes	%	±%
Labour	E. Hope	2,579	54.7	+5.6
Conservative	S. Bloor	1,524	32.3	+2.6
Liberal	S. Needoff	579	12.3	−3.4
Residents	A. R. Edwards	29	0.6	N/A
Majority		1,055	22.4	+3.0
Turnout		4,711	40.7	−6.9
Labour gain from Liberal		Swing		

==== November 1928 ====
1928
Party	Candidate	Votes	%	±%
Labour	E. Hope*	2,616	58.3	+9.2
Conservative	C. E. Goolden	1,813	40.4	+10.7
Residents	A. R. Edwards	60	1.3	N/A
Majority		803	17.9	−1.5
Turnout		4,489	39.3	−7.3
Labour hold		Swing		

==== November 1929 ====
1929
Party	Candidate	Votes	%	±%
Labour	J. G. Clapham*	2,000	49.3	−9.0
Conservative	F. James	1,178	29.0	−11.4
Residents	A. R. Edwards	882	21.7	+20.4
Majority		822	20.3	+2.4
Turnout		4,060	32.5	−6.8
Labour hold		Swing		

=== Elections in 1930s ===
==== November 1930 ====
1930
Party	Candidate	Votes	%	±%
Conservative	A. W. L. Smith	2,114	59.4	+30.4
Labour	A. Titt	1,447	40.6	−8.7
Majority		667	18.8	
Turnout		3,561		
Conservative gain from Labour		Swing		

==== November 1931 ====
1931
Party	Candidate	Votes	%	±%
Liberal	A. Todd	2,446	44.9	N/A
Ind. Labour Party	E. Hope*	1,662	30.5	N/A
Labour	L. Corcoran	1,341	24.6	−16.0
Majority		784	14.4	
Turnout		5,449	43.2	
Liberal gain from Ind. Labour Party		Swing		

==== November 1932 ====
1932
Party	Candidate	Votes	%	±%
Labour	J. G. Clapham*	2,144	54.4	+29.8
Conservative	A. E. Courtman	1,715	43.5	N/A
Communist	L. Evans	81	2.1	N/A
Majority		429	10.9	
Turnout		3,940		
Labour hold		Swing		

==== November 1933 ====
1933
Party	Candidate	Votes	%	±%
Labour	C. Beamand	2,400	57.5	+3.1
Conservative	A. E. Courtman	1,675	40.1	−3.4
Independent	P. J. Brett	65	1.6	N/A
Residents	A. M. Edwards	32	0.8	N/A
Majority		725	17.4	+6.5
Turnout		4,172		
Labour gain from Conservative		Swing		

==== November 1934 ====
1934
Party	Candidate	Votes	%	±%
Labour	A. Horan	1,845	59.8	+2.3
Liberal	A. Todd*	1,239	40.2	N/A
Majority		606	19.6	+2.2
Turnout		3,084		
Labour gain from Liberal		Swing		

==== November 1935 ====
1935
Party	Candidate	Votes	%	±%
Labour	J. G. Clapham*	1,838	52.0	−7.8
Conservative	R. B. Breeze	1,700	48.0	N/A
Majority		138	4.0	−15.6
Turnout		3,538		
Labour hold		Swing		

==== November 1936 ====
1936
Party	Candidate	Votes	%	±%
Labour	C. Beamand*	2,031	52.9	+0.9
Conservative	R. B. Breeze	1,808	47.1	−0.9
Majority		223	5.8	+1.8
Turnout		3,839		
Labour hold		Swing		

==== November 1937 ====
1937
Party	Candidate	Votes	%	±%
Conservative	R. B. Breeze	1,834	51.0	+3.9
Labour	A. B. Horan*	1,763	49.0	−3.9
Majority		71	2.0	
Turnout		3,597		
Conservative gain from Labour		Swing		

==== November 1938 ====
1938
Party	Candidate	Votes	%	±%
Conservative	J. H. Kearns	2,267	53.4	+2.4
Labour	J. G. Clapham*	1,840	43.3	−5.7
British Union	B. Talbot	139	3.3	N/A
Majority		427	10.1	+8.1
Turnout		4,246		
Conservative gain from Labour		Swing		

=== Elections in 1940s ===
==== November 1945 ====
1945
Party	Candidate	Votes	%	±%
Labour	R. E. Thomas*	2,293	57.3	+14.0
Conservative	J. R. Sorenson	1,518	38.0	−15.4
Residents	H. B. Frere	174	4.4	N/A
Independent	L. Weathers	14	0.4	N/A
Majority		775	19.3	
Turnout		3,999	35.4	
Labour hold		Swing		

==== November 1946 ====
1946
Party	Candidate	Votes	%	±%
Labour	C. Gordon	2,426	57.1	−0.2
Conservative	R. B. Breeze*	1,819	42.9	+4.9
Majority		607	14.2	−5.1
Turnout		4,245		
Labour gain from Conservative		Swing		

==== November 1947 ====
1947
Party	Candidate	Votes	%	±%
Conservative	J. H. Kearns*	3,218	53.4	+10.5
Labour	J. Dawson	2,805	46.6	−10.5
Majority		413	6.8	
Turnout		6,023		
Conservative hold		Swing		

==== May 1949 ====
1949
Party	Candidate	Votes	%	±%
Labour	R. E. Thomas*	2,702	51.2	+4.6
Conservative	F. Hyde	2,484	47.1	−6.3
Independent	J. Gillespie	89	1.7	N/A
Majority		218	4.1	
Turnout		5,275		
Labour hold		Swing		

=== Elections in 1950s ===
==== May 1950 ====
1950 (new boundaries)
Party	Candidate	Votes	%	±%
Labour	A. S. Reid	3,455	60.2	
Conservative	F. Hyde	2,280	39.8	
Majority		1,175	20.4	
Turnout		5,735		
Labour hold		Swing		

==== May 1951 ====
1951
Party	Candidate	Votes	%	±%
Labour	K. Collis	2,588	51.2	−9.0
Conservative	J. E. McManus	2,273	45.1	+5.3
Liberal	R. Frere	191	3.7	N/A
Majority		315	6.2	−14.2
Turnout		5,052		
Labour gain from Conservative		Swing		

==== May 1952 ====
1952
Party	Candidate	Votes	%	±%
Labour	R. E. Thomas*	4,023	71.1	+19.9
Conservative	J. E. McManus	1,637	28.9	−16.2
Majority		2,386	42.2	+36.0
Turnout		5,660		
Labour hold		Swing		

==== May 1953 ====
1953
Party	Candidate	Votes	%	±%
Labour	G. Mann	3,273	65.0	−6.1
Conservative	H. Spencer	1,763	35.0	+6.1
Majority		1,510	30.0	−12.2
Turnout		5,036		
Labour hold		Swing		

==== May 1954 ====
1954
Party	Candidate	Votes	%	±%
Labour	K. Collis*	3,235	71.3	+6.3
Conservative	J. Livesey	1,300	28.7	−6.3
Majority		1,935	42.6	+12.6
Turnout		4,535		
Labour hold		Swing		

==== May 1955 ====
1955
Party	Candidate	Votes	%	±%
Labour	R. E. Thomas*	2,554	63.8	−7.5
Conservative	J. Livesey	1,449	36.2	+7.5
Majority		1,105	27.6	−15.0
Turnout		4,003		
Labour hold		Swing		

==== May 1956 ====
1956
Party	Candidate	Votes	%	±%
Labour	G. Mann*	2,463	74.1	+10.3
Conservative	L. C. Hughes	862	25.9	−10.3
Majority		1,601	48.2	+20.6
Turnout		3,325		
Labour hold		Swing		

==== April 1957 (by-election) ====
By-election: 4 April 1957
Party	Candidate	Votes	%	±%
Labour	E. Mellor	1,885	72.8	−1.3
Conservative	J. Logan	705	27.2	+1.3
Majority		1,180	45.6	−2.6
Turnout		2,590		
Labour hold		Swing		

==== May 1957 ====
1957
Party	Candidate	Votes	%	±%
Labour	K. Collis*	1,995	71.8	−2.3
Conservative	J. Logan	783	28.2	+2.3
Majority		1,212	43.6	−4.6
Turnout		2,778		
Labour hold		Swing		

==== May 1958 ====
1958
Party	Candidate	Votes	%	±%
Labour	E. Mellor*	2,267	81.9	+10.1
Conservative	J. Logan	501	18.1	−10.1
Majority		1,766	63.8	+20.2
Turnout		2,768		
Labour hold		Swing		

==== May 1959 ====
1959
Party	Candidate	Votes	%	±%
Labour	G. Mann*	2,044	75.2	−6.7
Conservative	D. Meakin	675	24.8	+6.7
Majority		1,369	50.4	−13.4
Turnout		2,719		
Labour hold		Swing		

=== Elections in 1960s ===
==== May 1960 ====
1960
Party	Candidate	Votes	%	±%
Labour	K. Collis*	1,572	68.0	−7.2
Conservative	S. Alexander	741	32.0	+7.2
Majority		831	36.0	−14.4
Turnout		2,313		
Labour hold		Swing		

==== May 1961 ====
1961
Party	Candidate	Votes	%	±%
Labour	E. Mellor*	1,749	69.4	+1.4
Conservative	S. Alexander	771	30.6	−1.4
Majority		978	38.8	+2.8
Turnout		2,520		
Labour hold		Swing		

==== May 1962 ====
1962
Party	Candidate	Votes	%	±%
Labour	G. Mann*	1,918	71.9	+2.5
Conservative	N. P. Delayen	624	23.4	−7.2
Union Movement	N. Edwards	124	4.7	N/A
Majority		1,294	48.5	+9.7
Turnout		2,666		
Labour hold		Swing		

==== May 1963 ====
1963
Party	Candidate	Votes	%	±%
Labour	K. Collis*	1,924	78.8	+6.9
Conservative	N. P. Delayen	518	21.2	−2.2
Majority		1,406	57.6	+9.1
Turnout		2,442		
Labour hold		Swing		

==== May 1964 ====
1964
Party	Candidate	Votes	%	±%
Labour	E. Mellor*	1,383	80.4	+1.6
Conservative	C. J. Catarall	337	19.6	−1.6
Majority		1,046	60.8	+3.2
Turnout		1,720		
Labour hold		Swing		

==== May 1965 ====
1965
Party	Candidate	Votes	%	±%
Labour	G. Mann*	646	63.2	−17.2
Conservative	A. V. Cookson	376	36.8	+17.2
Majority		270	26.4	−34.4
Turnout		1,022		
Labour hold		Swing		

==== May 1966 ====
1966
Party	Candidate	Votes	%	±%
Labour	K. Collis*	451	72.5	+9.3
Conservative	A. V. Cookson	171	27.5	−9.3
Majority		280	45.0	+18.6
Turnout		622		
Labour hold		Swing		

==== May 1967 ====
1967
Party	Candidate	Votes	%	±%
Labour	E. Mellor*	300	49.8	−22.7
Conservative	G. H. Gilbertson	242	40.2	+12.7
Liberal	S. Rose	60	10.0	N/A
Majority		58	9.6	−35.3
Turnout		602		
Labour hold		Swing		

==== May 1968 ====
1968
Party	Candidate	Votes	%	±%
Labour	G. Mann*	375	58.6	+8.8
Conservative	T. J. Casby	265	41.4	+1.2
Majority		110	17.2	+7.6
Turnout		640		
Labour hold		Swing		

==== May 1969 ====
1969
Party	Candidate	Votes	%	±%
Labour	K. Collis*	556	58.7	+0.1
Conservative	T. J. Casby	391	41.3	−0.1
Majority		165	17.4	+0.2
Turnout		947		
Labour hold		Swing		

=== Elections in 1970s ===
==== May 1970 ====
1970
Party	Candidate	Votes	%	±%
Labour	E. Mellor*	694	72.7	+14.0
Conservative	J. H. Wood	169	17.7	−23.6
Liberal	A. G. Lishman	83	8.7	N/A
Residents	J. Carty	9	0.9	N/A
Majority		525	55.0	+37.6
Turnout		955		
Labour hold		Swing		

== See also ==
- Manchester City Council
- Manchester City Council elections
