= 1956 Manchester City Council election =

Local election in Manchester, England

- 10 May 1956

42 of 152 seats to Manchester City Council 77 seats needed for a majority
	First party	Second party	Third party
Party	Labour	Conservative	Liberal
Last election	20 seats, 47.2%	18 seats, 50.8%	0 seats, 1.5%
Seats before	86	63	3
Seats won	28	14	0
Seats after	87	62	3
Seat change	▲1	▼1	Steady
Popular vote	86,102	69,717	5,070
Percentage	53.1%	43.0%	3.1%
Swing	▲5.9%	▼7.8%	▲1.6%
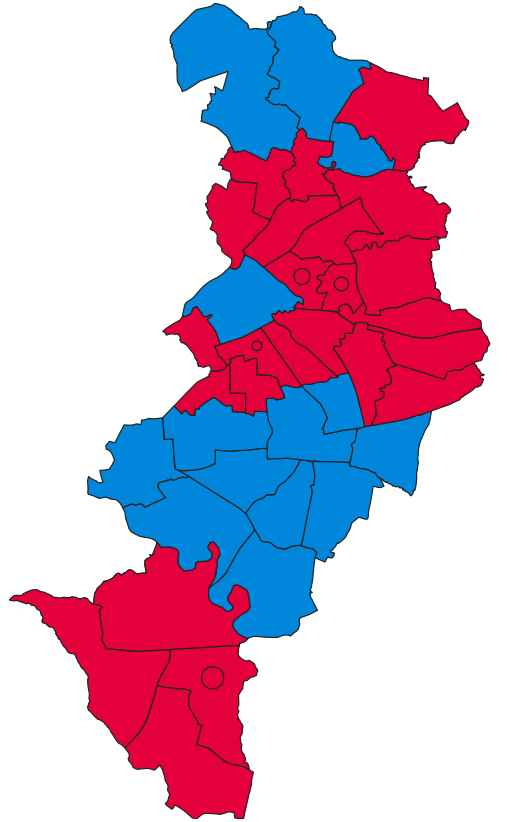
- Map of results of 1956 election
Leader of the Council before election
Labour
Leader of the Council after election
Labour

Elections to Manchester City Council were held on Thursday, 10 May 1956. One third of the councillors seats were up for election, with each successful candidate to serve a three-year term of office. The Labour Party retained overall control of the council.

== Election result ==
Party	Votes		Seats			Full Council	
Labour Party	86,102 (53.1%)	▲5.9	28 (66.7%)	28 / 42	▲1	87 (57.2%)	87 / 152
Conservative Party	69,717 (43.0%)	▼7.8	14 (33.3%)	14 / 42	▼1	62 (40.8%)	62 / 152
Liberal Party	5,070 (3.1%)	▲1.6	0 (0.0%)	0 / 42	Steady	3 (2.0%)	3 / 152
Communist	788 (0.5%)	Steady	0 (0.0%)	0 / 42	Steady	0 (0.0%)	0 / 152
Independent	436 (0.3%)	N/A	0 (0.0%)	0 / 42	N/A	0 (0.0%)	0 / 152

=== Full council ===
↓
87	3	62

=== Aldermen ===
↓
20	3	15

=== Councillors ===
↓
67	47

== Ward results ==
=== Alexandra Park ===
Alexandra Park
Party	Candidate	Votes	%	±%
Conservative	H. Ward*	2,838	60.0	−21.1
Liberal	G. E. Sharpe	1,071	22.6	N/A
Labour	H. W. Bliss	821	17.4	−1.5
Majority		1,767	37.4	−24.8
Turnout		4,730		
Conservative hold		Swing		

=== All Saints' ===
All Saints' (2 vacancies)
Party	Candidate	Votes	%	±%
Labour	F. P. Evans	1,818	64.3	+4.3
Labour	J. H. Parish*	1,728	61.1	+1.1
Conservative	W. J. Geddes	1,056	37.3	−2.7
Majority		672	23.8	+3.8
Turnout		2,829		
Labour hold		Swing		
Labour hold		Swing		

=== Ardwick ===
Ardwick
Party	Candidate	Votes	%	±%
Labour	V. Wilson*	2,319	63.2	+0.6
Conservative	G. Jackson	1,352	36.8	−0.6
Majority		967	26.4	+1.2
Turnout		3,671		
Labour hold		Swing		

=== Baguley ===
Baguley
Party	Candidate	Votes	%	±%
Labour	W. Gallacher*	3,000	59.2	+5.3
Conservative	H. T. Fairclough	2,068	40.8	−5.3
Majority		932	18.4	+10.6
Turnout		5,068		
Labour hold		Swing		

=== Barlow Moor ===
Barlow Moor
Party	Candidate	Votes	%	±%
Conservative	A. Hooley*	1,574	59.8	−9.9
Labour	E. Wood	1,059	40.2	+9.9
Majority		515	19.6	−19.8
Turnout		2,633		
Conservative hold		Swing		

=== Benchill ===
Benchill (2 vacancies)
Party	Candidate	Votes	%	±%
Labour	H. S. Gatley*	2,467	57.9	+6.3
Labour	R. L. Griffiths	2,357	55.3	+3.7
Conservative	R. Clarkson	1,665	39.0	−6.6
Conservative	E. Birley	1,658	38.9	−6.7
Communist	G. Taylor	190	4.5	+1.7
Majority		692	16.2	+10.2
Turnout		4,264		
Labour hold		Swing		
Labour hold		Swing		

=== Beswick ===
Beswick (2 vacancies)
Party	Candidate	Votes	%	±%
Labour	J. G. Birtles*	2,275	77.2	+3.1
Labour	R. Malcolm	2,139	72.6	−1.5
Conservative	R. B. Crompton	738	25.1	−0.8
Majority		1,401	47.5	−0.7
Turnout		2,945		
Labour hold		Swing		
Labour hold		Swing		

=== Blackley ===
Blackley
Party	Candidate	Votes	%	±%
Conservative	J. A. Lynch*	3,541	59.3	−4.2
Labour	A. J. Fahey	2,431	40.7	+4.2
Majority		1,110	18.6	−8.4
Turnout		5,972		
Conservative hold		Swing		

=== Bradford ===
Bradford
Party	Candidate	Votes	%	±%
Labour	G. McCall*	3,080	75.2	+8.0
Conservative	H. J. Caulfield	1,017	24.8	−8.0
Majority		2,063	50.4	+16.0
Turnout		4,097		
Labour hold		Swing		

=== Burnage ===
Burnage
Party	Candidate	Votes	%	±%
Conservative	L. W. Biggs*	3,068	60.9	−3.5
Labour	J. S. Goldstone	1,968	39.1	+3.5
Majority		1,100	21.8	−7.0
Turnout		5,036		
Conservative hold		Swing		

=== Cheetham ===
Cheetham
Party	Candidate	Votes	%	±%
Labour	M. P. Pariser*	1,705	50.3	+2.8
Liberal	S. Needoff	1,157	34.1	+4.7
Conservative	M. J. McGregor	529	15.6	−7.5
Majority		548	16.2	−1.9
Turnout		3,391		
Labour hold		Swing		

=== Chorlton-cum-Hardy ===
Chorlton-cum-Hardy
Party	Candidate	Votes	%	±%
Conservative	G. W. G. Fitzsimons*	3,366	83.1	+1.5
Labour	R. E. Talbot	683	16.9	−1.5
Majority		2,683	66.2	+3.0
Turnout		4,049		
Conservative hold		Swing		

=== Collegiate Church ===
Collegiate Church
Party	Candidate	Votes	%	±%
Labour	E. Mendell*	1,668	79.4	+6.0
Conservative	F. Hargreaves	264	12.6	−9.3
Communist	M. I. Druck	168	8.0	+3.3
Majority		1,404	66.8	+15.3
Turnout		2,100		
Labour hold		Swing		

=== Crumpsall ===
Crumpsall
Party	Candidate	Votes	%	±%
Conservative	R. Collier*	3,172	56.7	−3.5
Labour	K. Franklin	2,420	43.3	+3.5
Majority		752	13.4	−7.0
Turnout		5,592		
Conservative hold		Swing		

=== Didsbury ===
Didsbury
Party	Candidate	Votes	%	±%
Conservative	D. K. Lee*	2,720	55.5	−13.8
Liberal	E. Noble	1,616	32.9	+13.9
Labour	A. Haslam	569	11.6	−0.1
Majority		1,104	22.6	−27.7
Turnout		4,905		
Conservative hold		Swing		

=== Gorton North ===
Gorton North
Party	Candidate	Votes	%	±%
Labour	F. Siddall*	3,556	72.1	+5.9
Conservative	B. H. Farrow	1,376	27.9	−3.4
Majority		2,180	44.2	+9.3
Turnout		4,932		
Labour hold		Swing		

=== Gorton South ===
Gorton South
Party	Candidate	Votes	%	±%
Labour	H. Wimbury*	2,058	68.7	+16.9
Conservative	T. Brownrigg	938	31.3	−16.9
Majority		1,120	37.4	+33.8
Turnout		2,996		
Labour hold		Swing		

=== Harpurhey ===
Harpurhey
Party	Candidate	Votes	%	±%
Labour	E. Grant*	2,691	58.0	+4.2
Conservative	E. Bland	1,952	42.0	−4.2
Majority		739	16.0	+8.4
Turnout		4,643		
Labour hold		Swing		

=== Hugh Oldham ===
Hugh Oldham
Party	Candidate	Votes	%	±%
Labour	J. B. Ogden*	1,691	72.8	+1.6
Conservative	J. C. Brearley	475	20.4	−2.8
Communist	E. Cohen	157	6.8	+2.2
Majority		1,216	52.4	+5.4
Turnout		2,323		
Labour hold		Swing		

=== Levenshulme ===
Levenshulme
Party	Candidate	Votes	%	±%
Conservative	R. A. Fieldhouse*	2,597	65.3	−7.4
Labour	W. Pearlman	1,380	34.7	+7.4
Majority		1,217	30.6	−14.8
Turnout		3,977		
Conservative hold		Swing		

=== Lightbowne ===
Lightbowne
Party	Candidate	Votes	%	±%
Conservative	H. Piggott*	3,268	50.4	+0.6
Labour	G. Halstead	2,536	39.1	−2.7
Liberal	F. N. Wedlock	683	10.5	+2.1
Majority		732	11.3	+3.3
Turnout		6,487		
Conservative hold		Swing		

=== Longsight ===
Longsight
Party	Candidate	Votes	%	±%
Conservative	H. Sharp*	2,248	57.0	−7.2
Labour	J. Davis	1,694	43.0	+7.2
Majority		554	14.0	−14.4
Turnout		3,942		
Conservative hold		Swing		

=== Miles Platting ===
Miles Platting
Party	Candidate	Votes	%	±%
Labour	C. R. Morris*	1,878	69.3	+8.9
Conservative	T. E. Downes	832	30.7	−8.9
Majority		1,046	38.6	+17.8
Turnout		2,710		
Labour hold		Swing		

=== Moss Side East ===
Moss Side East
Party	Candidate	Votes	%	±%
Labour	W. A. Downward	2,538	55.7	+10.6
Conservative	L. V. Roy	1,927	42.3	−10.5
Communist	L. B. Johnson	92	2.0	−0.1
Majority		611	13.4	
Turnout		4,557		
Labour hold		Swing		

=== Moss Side West ===
Moss Side West
Party	Candidate	Votes	%	±%
Labour	B. Lawson*	2,082	45.3	+6.1
Conservative	L. Lescure	2,077	45.2	−15.6
Independent	G. J. Playford	436	9.5	N/A
Majority		5	0.1	
Turnout		4,595		
Labour hold		Swing		

=== Moston ===
Moston
Party	Candidate	Votes	%	±%
Labour	W. M. McGuirk*	3,105	53.6	+0.9
Conservative	M. Dunn	2,684	46.4	−0.9
Majority		421	7.2	+1.8
Turnout		5,789		
Labour hold		Swing		

=== New Cross ===
New Cross (2 vacancies)
Party	Candidate	Votes	%	±%
Labour	W. Murray*	1,535	71.2	+5.7
Labour	E. Crank	1,450	68.0	+2.5
Conservative	K. Corless	639	30.0	−4.5
Majority		811	38.0	+7.0
Turnout		2,132		
Labour hold		Swing		
Labour hold		Swing		

=== Newton Heath ===
Newton Heath
Party	Candidate	Votes	%	±%
Labour	W. Lister*	2,437	69.4	+5.6
Conservative	F. H. Robinson	1,072	30.6	−5.6
Majority		1,365	38.8	+11.2
Turnout		3,509		
Labour hold		Swing		

=== Northenden ===
Northenden
Party	Candidate	Votes	%	±%
Labour	S. N. M. Moxley	2,877	51.6	+3.5
Conservative	T. C. Hewlett*	2,700	48.4	−3.5
Majority		177	3.2	
Turnout		5,577		
Labour gain from Conservative		Swing		

=== Old Moat ===
Old Moat
Party	Candidate	Votes	%	±%
Conservative	W. Sharp*	1,950	56.3	−13.6
Labour	E. H. Jessop	974	28.1	−2.1
Liberal	R. H. Hargreaves	543	15.6	N/A
Majority		976	28.2	−11.4
Turnout		3,467		
Conservative hold		Swing		

=== Openshaw ===
Openshaw
Party	Candidate	Votes	%	±%
Labour	M. E. Morley	3,157	71.7	+4.0
Conservative	E. D. Lowe	1,063	24.2	−5.3
Communist	J. Hodgson	181	4.1	+1.3
Majority		2,094	47.5	+9.3
Turnout		4,401		
Labour hold		Swing		

=== Rusholme ===
Rusholme
Party	Candidate	Votes	%	±%
Conservative	K. Ollerenshaw	2,989	69.3	−2.7
Labour	S. C. Rimmer	1,323	30.7	+2.7
Majority		1,666	38.6	−5.4
Turnout		4,312		
Conservative hold		Swing		

=== St. George's ===
St. George's
Party	Candidate	Votes	%	±%
Labour	G. Mann*	2,463	74.1	+10.3
Conservative	L. C. Hughes	862	25.9	−10.3
Majority		1,601	48.2	+20.6
Turnout		3,325		
Labour hold		Swing		

=== St. Luke's ===
St. Luke's
Party	Candidate	Votes	%	±%
Labour	W. Massey	2,280	57.8	+8.2
Conservative	N. Kenyon	1,667	42.2	−8.2
Majority		613	15.6	
Turnout		3,947		
Labour hold		Swing		

=== St. Mark's ===
St. Mark's
Party	Candidate	Votes	%	±%
Labour	N. Morris	2,932	65.9	−0.9
Conservative	R. Jones	1,514	34.1	+0.9
Majority		1,418	31.8	−1.8
Turnout		4,446		
Labour hold		Swing		

=== St. Peter's ===
St. Peter's
Party	Candidate	Votes	%	±%
Conservative	J. Carson	1,226	71.6	−3.6
Labour	C. E. Bedgood	486	28.4	+3.6
Majority		740	43.2	−7.2
Turnout		1,712		
Conservative hold		Swing		

=== Withington ===
Withington
Party	Candidate	Votes	%	±%
Conservative	W. H. Scholfield*	2,089	71.5	−11.7
Labour	N. Selwyn	834	28.5	+11.7
Majority		1,255	43.0	−23.4
Turnout		2,923		
Conservative hold		Swing		

=== Woodhouse Park ===
Woodhouse Park
Party	Candidate	Votes	%	±%
Labour	H. Waddicor*	3,638	79.4	+13.2
Conservative	C. G. Tilley	946	20.6	−13.2
Majority		2,692	58.8	+26.4
Turnout		4,584		
Labour hold		Swing		

== Aldermanic elections ==
=== Aldermanic election, 5 December 1956 ===
Caused by the death on 11 November 1956 of Alderman C. A. Wood (Conservative, elected as an alderman by the council on 6 December 1922).

In his place, Councillor Forrester Lord (Labour, Gorton North, elected 5 March 1941) was elected as an alderman by the council on 5 December 1956.

Party	Alderman	Ward	Term expires
Labour	Forrester Lord	Crumpsall	1961

=== Aldermanic election, 9 January 1957 ===
Caused by the death on 20 December 1956 of Alderman Tom Nally (Labour, elected as an alderman by the council on 4 January 1956).

In his place, Councillor Bob Thomas (Labour, St. George's, elected 5 January 1944) was elected as an alderman by the council on 9 January 1957.

Party	Alderman	Ward	Term expires
Labour	Bob Thomas	Levenshulme	1958

== By-elections between 1956 and 1957 ==
=== By-elections, 4 April 1957 ===
Two by-elections were held on 4 April 1957 to fill vacancies that were created by the appointment of aldermen on 5 December 1956 and 9 January 1957.

==== Gorton North ====
Caused by the election as an alderman of Councillor Forrester Lord (Labour, Gorton North, elected 5 March 1941) on 5 December 1956, following the death on 11 November 1956 of Alderman C. A. Wood (Conservative, elected as an alderman by the council on 6 December 1922).

Gorton North
Party	Candidate	Votes	%	±%
Labour	N. Leech	2,901	80.3	+8.2
Conservative	A. Nixon	711	19.7	−8.2
Majority		2,190	60.6	+16.4
Turnout		3,612		
Labour hold		Swing		

==== St. George's ====
Caused by the election as an alderman of Councillor Bob Thomas (Labour, St. George's, elected 5 January 1944) on 9 January 1957, following the death on 20 December 1956 of Alderman Tom Nally (Labour, elected as an alderman by the council on 4 January 1956).

St. George's
Party	Candidate	Votes	%	±%
Labour	E. Mellor	1,885	72.8	−1.3
Conservative	J. Logan	705	27.2	+1.3
Majority		1,180	45.6	−2.6
Turnout		2,590		
Labour hold		Swing		
