= Greater Manchester County Council =

English local government body, 1974–1986

Greater Manchester County Council Greater Manchester Council
- Greater Manchester
- Coat of arms of the Greater Manchester County Council

Type
- Type: Metropolitan County Council

History
- Established: 1 April 1974
- Disbanded: 31 March 1986
- Preceded by: Various authorities, including Cheshire County Council, Lancashire County Council, and West Riding County Council
- Succeeded by: Various agencies and the Association of Greater Manchester Authorities
- Seats: 106

Meeting place
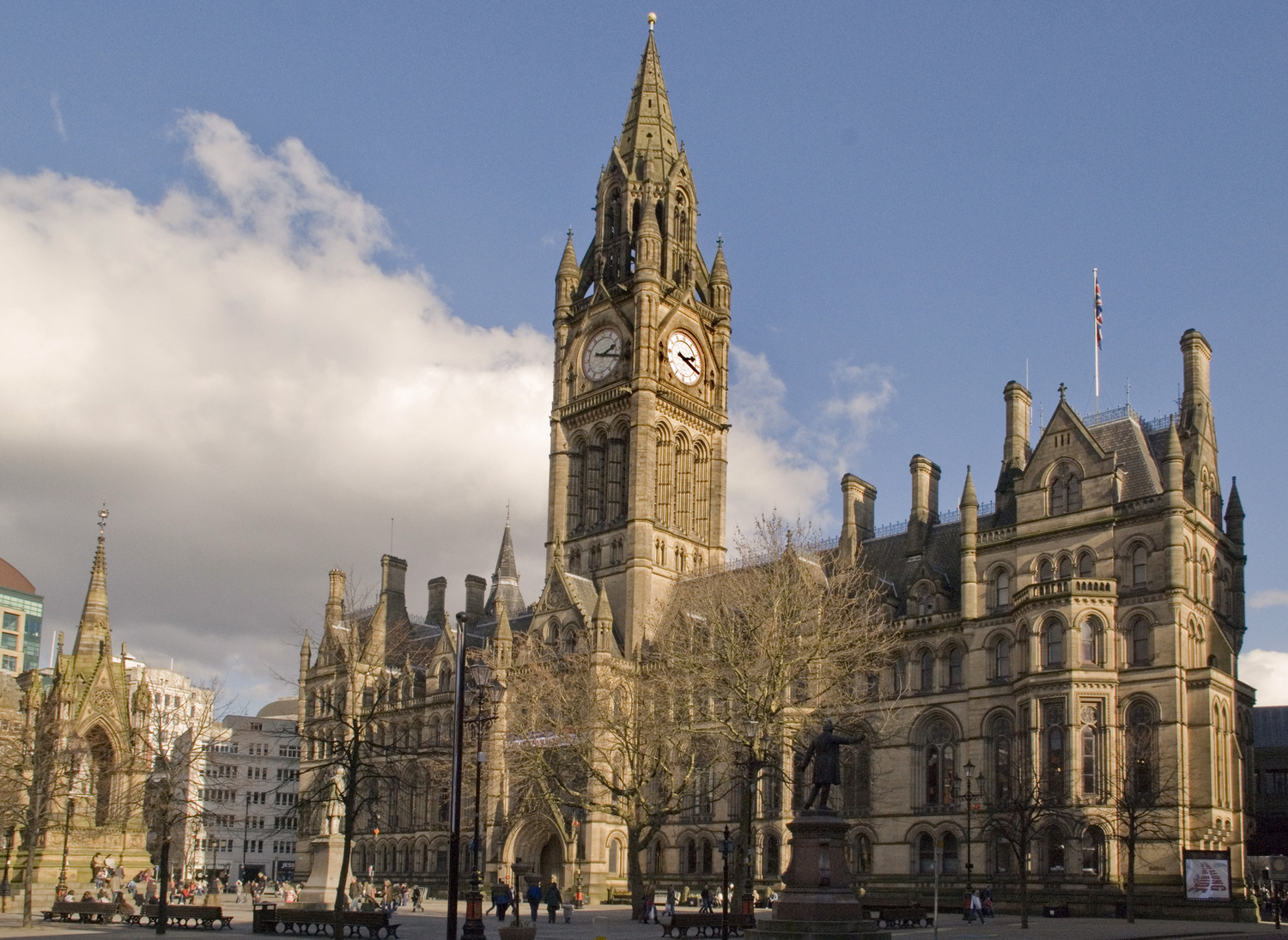
- Town Hall, Manchester, England

The Greater Manchester County Council (GMCC) was the top-tier local government administrative body for Greater Manchester from 1974 to 1986. A strategic authority, with responsibilities for roads, public transport, planning, emergency services and waste disposal, it was composed of 106 directly elected members drawn from the ten metropolitan boroughs of Greater Manchester. The Greater Manchester County Council shared power with ten lower-tier district councils, each of which directed local matters. It was also known as the Greater Manchester Council (GMC) and the Greater Manchester Metropolitan County Council (GMMCC).

Established with reference to the Local Government Act 1972, elections in 1973 brought about the county council's launch as a shadow authority, several months before Greater Manchester (its zone of influence) was officially created on 1 April 1974. The Greater Manchester County Council operated from its County Hall headquarters on Portland Street in central Manchester, until it was abolished 31 March 1986, following the Local Government Act 1985. Its powers were passed to the ten district councils of Greater Manchester, which had shared power with the GMCC. Some powers of the county council were restored when the district councils delegated strategic responsibilities (such as emergency services and public transport) to the county-wide Association of Greater Manchester Authorities and joint boards.

== History ==
=== Creation ===
The Local Government Act 1972 reformed local government in England by creating a system of two-tier metropolitan and non-metropolitan counties and districts throughout the country. The act formally established Greater Manchester as a metropolitan county on 1 April 1974. The first election for the Greater Manchester County Council (GMCC) was held in 1973, operating as a shadow authority alongside the old councils until it formally assumed its powers on 1 April 1974. The leading article in The Times on the day the Local Government Act came into effect noted that the "new arrangement is a compromise which seeks to reconcile familiar geography which commands a certain amount of affection and loyalty, with the scale of operations on which modern planning methods can work effectively".

=== Operational history ===
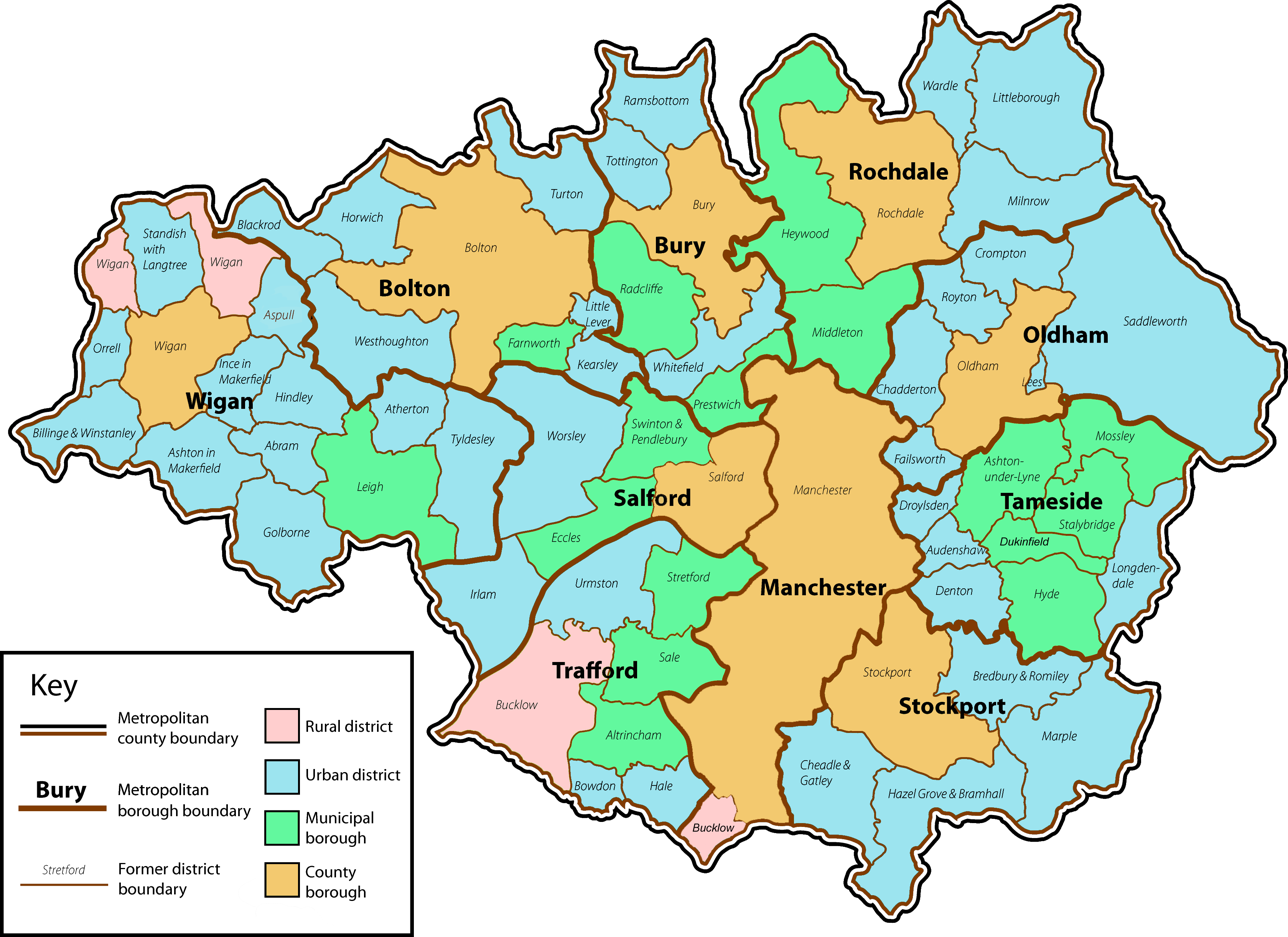
Map of the region administered by Greater Manchester County Council, showing 10 metropolitan districts and the former pre-1972 urban districts

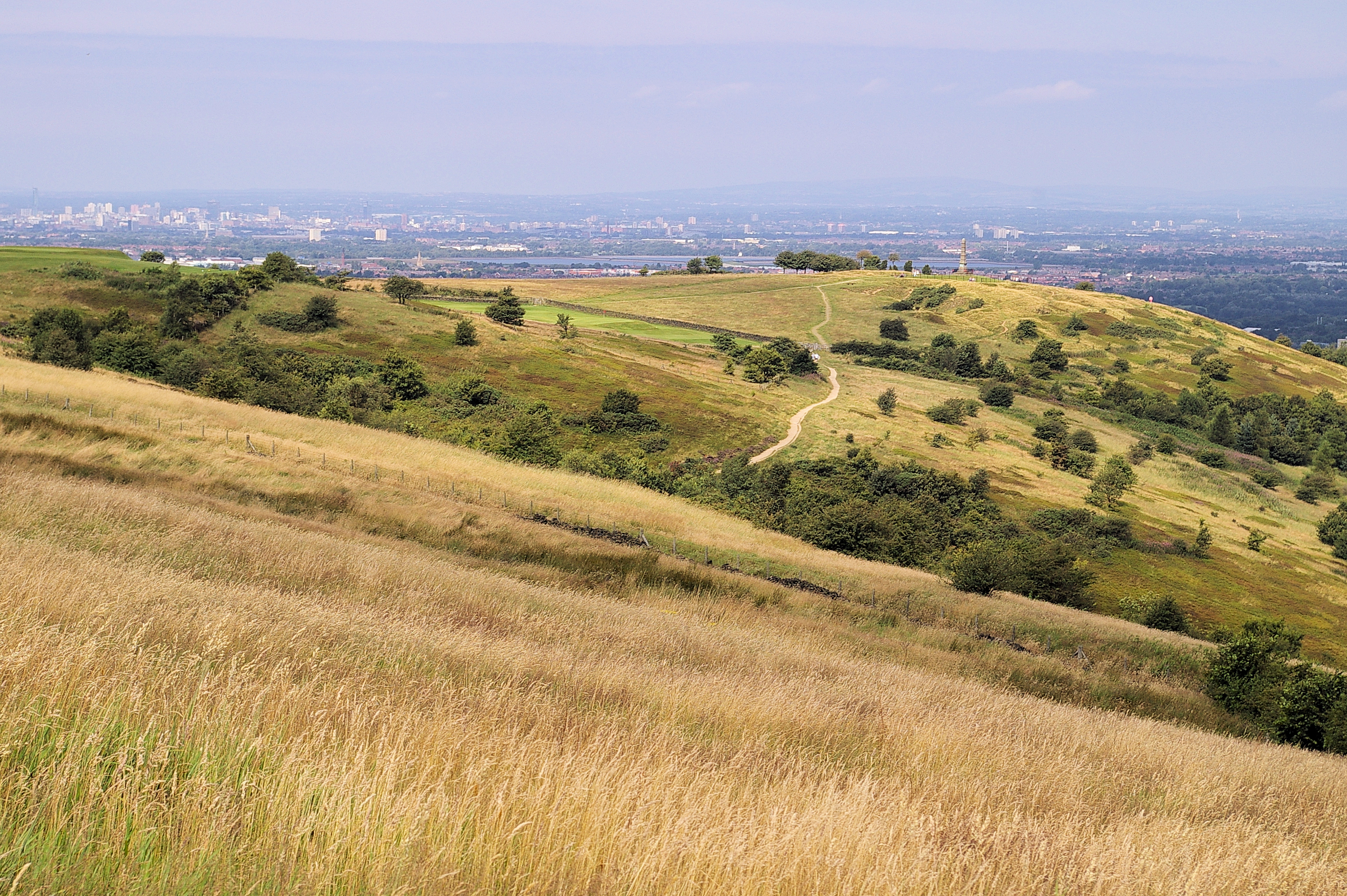
Werneth Low was one of several rural areas which became a country park under the governance of the Greater Manchester County Council.

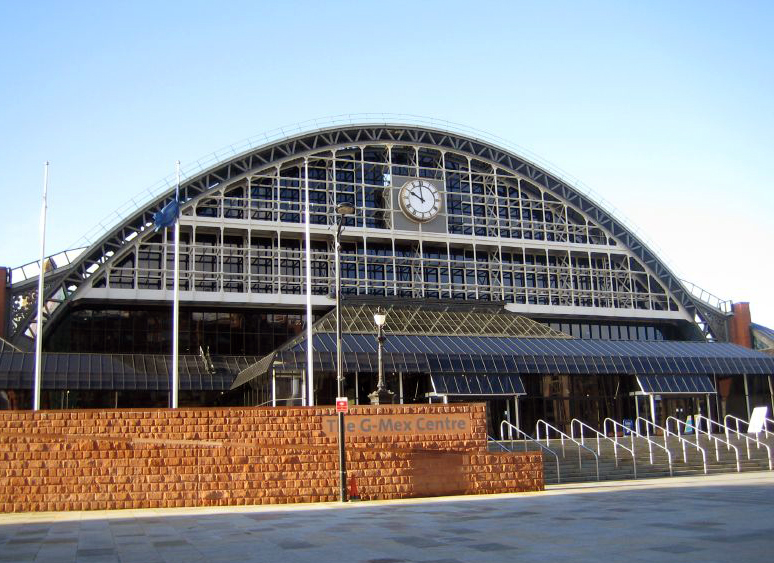
The G-Mex centre, established by the GMC in 1986

By January 1974, a joint working party representing Greater Manchester had drawn up its county Structure Plan, ready for implementation by the Greater Manchester County Council. The plan set out strategic and long-term objectives for the forthcoming metropolitan county. The highest priority was to increase the quality of life for its inhabitants by way of improving the county's physical environment and cultural facilities which had suffered following deindustrialisation—much of Greater Manchester's basic infrastructure dated from its 19th-century industrial growth, and was unsuited to modern communication systems and life-styles. Other objectives were to reverse the trend of depopulation in central-Greater Manchester, to invest in the county's country parks to improve the region's poor reputation on leisure and recreational facilities, and to improve the county's transport infrastructure and journey to work patterns.

Because of political objection, particularly from Cheshire, Greater Manchester covered only the inner, urban 62 of the 90 former districts that the Royal Commission had outlined as an effective administrative metropolitan area. In this capacity, GMCC found itself "planning for an arbitrary metropolitan area ... abruptly truncated to the south", and so had to negotiate several land-use, transport and housing projects with its neighbouring county councils. However a "major programme of environmental action" by GMCC broadly succeeded in reversing social deprivation in its inner city slums. Leisure and recreational successes included the Greater Manchester Exhibition Centre (better known as the G-Mex centre and now branded Manchester Central), a converted former railway station in Manchester city centre used for cultural events, and GMCC's creation of five new country parks within its boundaries. Greater Manchester Transport was established from the former SELNEC PTE to operate the county's public transport.

GMCC was, however, criticised for being too Manchester-centric by representatives from the outer suburbs.

=== Abolition ===
A decade after they were established, the mostly Labour-controlled metropolitan county councils and the Greater London Council (GLC) had several high-profile clashes with the Conservative government of Margaret Thatcher, with regard to overspending and high rates charging. Government policy on the issue was considered throughout 1982, and the Conservative Party put a "promise to scrap the metropolitan county councils" and the GLC, in their manifesto for the 1983 general election. Greater Manchester County Council was abolished on 31 March 1986 under the Local Government Act 1985. That the metropolitan county councils were controlled by the Labour Party led to accusations that their abolition was motivated by party politics: the general secretary of the National Association of Local Government Officers described it as a "completely cynical manoeuvre". Most of the functions of GMCC were devolved to the ten Greater Manchester metropolitan district councils, though some functions such as emergency services and public transport were taken over by joint boards and continued to be run on a county-wide basis. The Association of Greater Manchester Authorities (AGMA) was established to continue much of the county-wide services of the county council. The metropolitan county continued to exist in law, and as a geographic frame of reference, for example as a NUTS 2 administrative division for statistical purposes within the European Union.

=== Aftermath ===
Although the metropolitan county council was abolished in 1986, the county area continues to exist, for Parliamentary representation, in mapping, and especially for statistical purposes. The county continues to exist today as both a legal and geographic entity, and has its own Lord Lieutenant (the Monarch's representative in a county) and High Sheriff.

The last leader of Greater Manchester County Council, Bernard Clarke, became the manager of the YMCA's Training for Life project and a director of Manchester Travel Services and of Manchester's Museum of Science and Industry. The county council's last Chief executive, Tony Harrison, a solicitor, remained Clerk to the Lord Lieutenant of Greater Manchester after abolition and became a director of various companies. In February 1992, wrongly believing he was suffering from Alzheimer's disease, 61-year-old Harrison committed suicide.

In March 2010, following the active pursuit of the Association of Greater Manchester Authorities, it was agreed by the government of the United Kingdom and the ten district councils of Greater Manchester that there should be a return to a statutory, two-tiered system of local governance for Greater Manchester. The Greater Manchester Combined Authority was agreed upon to strategically govern Greater Manchester from 1 April 2011. It consists of eleven members: ten indirectly elected members, each a directly elected councillor from one of the ten metropolitan boroughs that comprise Greater Manchester and elected Mayor of Greater Manchester who chairs the Authority. The authority will derive most of its powers from the Local Government Act 2000 and Local Democracy, Economic Development and Construction Act 2009.

== Powers and composition ==
The Greater Manchester County Council was a strategic authority running regional services such as public transport, health provision, planning and emergency services. It served to provide a strategic regional framework within which the differing plans of its ten metropolitan borough councils could be harmonised.

== Premises ==
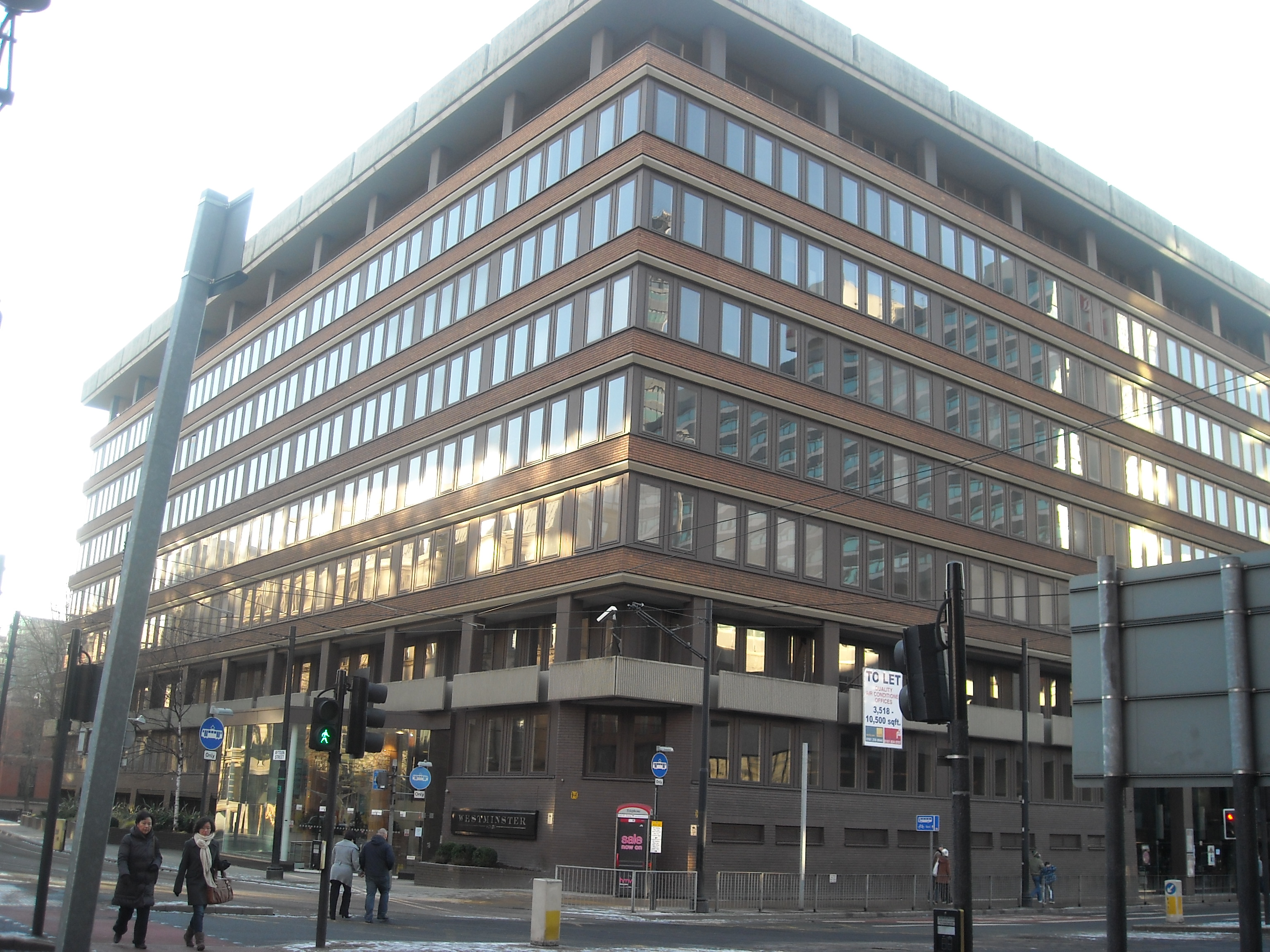
County Hall, Manchester

The council established its main offices at a newly-built office block on Portland Street in Manchester city centre, which had been speculatively built between 1971 and 1973 as an investment property for Hambro Life at a cost of £4.5 million (£34,950,000 as of 2025). The building was initially called the Portland Centre by its developers. The county council took a lease of the building, taking possession in January 1974, and renamed it County Hall. The council later bought the building. There was no council chamber at County Hall, so full council meetings were held at Manchester Town Hall.

After the council's abolition, County Hall was sold to Parc Securities in 1988 for an undisclosed sum, believed to be between £5 and £6 million, and refurbished for offices. County Hall Properties bought the structure from Parc two years later and renamed it Westminster House, possibly alluding to the government that abolished the Greater Manchester County Council; the managing director of County Hall (Manchester) Management, the former GMCC economic development chief and former Parc consultant Leslie Boardman, declined to disclose the purchase price in 1992, but press reports put it at about £22 million. The seven-storey building became used by the Halifax and Chelsea building societies, the AGF and Scottish Amicable insurance companies, and the German consulate.

== Political control ==
The first election to the council was held in 1973, initially operating as a shadow authority before coming into its powers on 1 April 1974. Political control of the council from 1974 until its abolition in 1986 was as follows:

Party in control	Years
Labour	1974–1977
Conservative	1977–1981
Labour	1981–1986

=== Leadership ===
The first leader of the council, Bob Thomas, was formerly leader of Manchester City Council. The leaders of the council were:

Councillor	Party	From	To
Bob Thomas	Labour	1 Apr 1974	May 1977
Arnold Fieldhouse	Conservative	May 1977	May 1981
Bernard Clarke	Labour	May 1981	31 Mar 1986

=== Council elections ===
Elections were held to the Greater Manchester County Council three times, in 1973, 1977, and 1981.

Year	Conservative	Labour	Liberal	Independent
1973	23	69	13	1
1977	82	23	0	1
1981	19	78	9	0

Elections were due to be held in 1985 but these were cancelled due to the council's impending abolition. Those councillors elected in 1981 had their terms of office extended until the council's abolition on 31 March 1986.

== Coat of arms ==
The coat of arms granted by the College of Arms to the Greater Manchester Council are described as:

Shield: The shield bears ten turrets in gold, representing the ten districts of the County, on a red ground.

Supporters: The shield is supported on each side by a lion rampant in gold. Each lion bears on its shoulder a badge in red, the lion on the right of the shield bearing a badge with a French horn, representing music and culture, and the lion on the left of the shield bearing a badge with an open book, representing learning and academic life of the County.

Crest: The helm is surmounted by a demi-lion carrying a banner bearing ten small turrets in gold on a red ground.

Motto: Ever Vigilant.

== See also ==
- Greater Manchester Combined Authority
- Mayor of Greater Manchester
