= Ken Collis =

Ken Collis

Ken Collis, OBE (1923- 2004) was a prominent politician in Manchester. He notably represented the ward of Sharston.

He was first elected to Manchester City Council in 1951 and served for 39 years. He worked as a maintenance engineer. He was actively involved in the management of Mobberley Approved School. He was the first chair of the Social Services Committee and later was Lord Mayor of the City in 1974. He was also chairman of Manchester Health Authority.

He and his wife Pat ran a flower stall at Wythenshawe market.

Honorary titles
Preceded by Edward Grant	Lord Mayor of Manchester; 1973–1974	Succeeded by Frederick Balcombe
