= 1945 Manchester City Council election =

Local election in Manchester, England

- 1 November 1945

56 of 144 seats to Manchester City Council 73 seats needed for a majority
	First party	Second party	Third party
Party	Labour	Conservative	Liberal
Last election	14 seats, 42.4%	17 seats, 46.7%	4 seats, 6.7%
Seats before	55	67	20
Seats won	35	19	2
Seats after	69	58	15
Seat change	▲14	▼9	▼5
Popular vote	155,143	108,826	18,221
Percentage	54.0%	37.9%	6.3%
Swing	▲11.6%	▼8.8%	▼0.4%
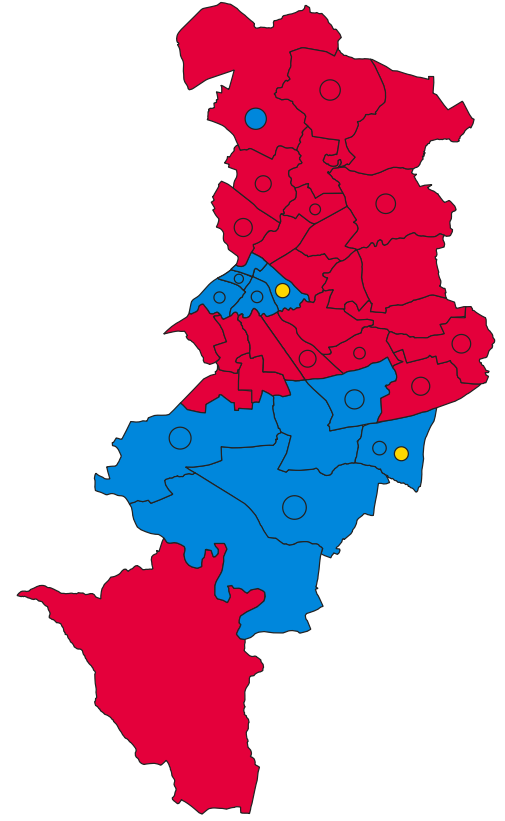
- Map of results of 1945 election
Leader of the Council before election
No overall control
Leader of the Council after election
No overall control

Elections to Manchester City Council were held on Thursday, 1 November 1945. One third of the councillors seats were up for election, with each successful candidate to serve a three-year term of office. The council remained under no overall control. These were the first local elections held in Manchester since the outbreak of the Second World War.

== Election result ==
Party	Votes		Seats			Full Council	
Labour Party	155,143 (54.0%)	▲11.6	35 (62.5%)	35 / 56	▲14	69 (47.9%)	69 / 144
Conservative Party	108,826 (37.9%)	▼8.8	19 (33.9%)	19 / 56	▼9	58 (40.3%)	58 / 144
Liberal Party	18,221 (6.3%)	▼0.4	2 (3.6%)	2 / 56	▼5	15 (10.4%)	15 / 144
Residents	936 (0.3%)	▼0.7	0 (0.0%)	0 / 56	Steady	1 (0.7%)	1 / 144
Communist	796 (0.3%)	N/A	0 (0.0%)	0 / 56	Steady	1 (0.7%)	1 / 144
Independent	2,622 (0.9%)	▼0.5	0 (0.0%)	0 / 56	Steady	0 (0.0%)	0 / 144
Independent Labour Party	822 (0.3%)	N/A	0 (0.0%)	0 / 56	N/A	0 (0.0%)	0 / 144

=== Full council ===
↓
1	69	15	1	58

=== Aldermen ===
↓
14	9	13

=== Councillors ===
↓
1	55	6	1	45

== Ward results ==
=== All Saints' ===
All Saints'
Party	Candidate	Votes	%	±%
Labour	F. Evans	1,261	52.9	+18.5
Conservative	A. Holberry*	1,093	45.8	−18.8
Independent	F. R. Phillips	31	1.3	N/A
Majority		168	7.1	
Turnout		2,385	24.4	
Labour gain from Conservative		Swing		

=== Ardwick ===
Ardwick
Party	Candidate	Votes	%	±%
Labour	J. McGrath*	2,537	51.8	+8.2
Conservative	T. Dobbins	2,362	48.2	−5.9
Majority		175	3.6	
Turnout		4,899	40.0	
Labour hold		Swing		

=== Beswick ===
Beswick (2 vacancies)
Party	Candidate	Votes	%	±%
Labour	W. Winstanley*	3,831	75.0	N/A
Labour	T. W. Farrell	3,758	73.5	N/A
Independent	J. McGuiness	1,279	25.0	N/A
Majority		2,479	48.5	N/A
Turnout		5,110	34.2	
Labour hold		Swing		
Labour hold		Swing		

=== Blackley ===
Blackley (2 vacancies)
Party	Candidate	Votes	%	±%
Labour	E. Cruse	3,898	43.8	+1.6
Labour	R. B. Prain	3,821	43.0	+0.8
Conservative	P. Chadwick*	3,637	40.9	−16.9
Conservative	G. W. Bryant	3,426	38.5	−19.3
Liberal	J. H. Culley	1,358	15.3	N/A
Liberal	S. Critchley	1,246	14.0	N/A
Majority		184	2.1	
Turnout		8,893	44.2	
Labour gain from Conservative		Swing		
Labour gain from Conservative		Swing		

=== Bradford ===
Bradford
Party	Candidate	Votes	%	±%
Labour	R. Malcolm*	4,163	74.9	N/A
Conservative	E. Griffiths	1,395	25.1	N/A
Majority		2,768	49.8	N/A
Turnout		5,558	31.6	
Labour hold		Swing		

=== Cheetham ===
Cheetham (2 vacancies)
Party	Candidate	Votes	%	±%
Labour	H. Goldstone	3,752	53.8	+31.2
Labour	F. H. A. Micklewright	3,578	51.3	+28.7
Conservative	H. G. S. Lorimer*	1,753	25.2	−22.0
Conservative	W. L. Goodfellow	1,748	25.1	−22.1
Liberal	S. Needoff*	1,465	21.0	−9.2
Liberal	R. Phelan	784	11.3	−18.9
Majority		1,825	26.1	
Turnout		6,970	44.3	
Labour gain from Liberal		Swing		
Labour gain from Conservative		Swing		

=== Chorlton-cum-Hardy ===
Chorlton-cum-Hardy (2 vacancies)
Party	Candidate	Votes	%	±%
Conservative	M. S. Whittaker*	6,981	66.9	−8.0
Conservative	R. Turley*	6,979	66.9	−8.0
Labour	F. Kelsall	3,453	33.1	+8.0
Labour	W. H. Brightman	3,280	31.4	+8.0
Majority		3,526	33.8	−16.0
Turnout		10,434	31.6	
Conservative hold		Swing		
Conservative hold		Swing		

=== Collegiate Church ===
Collegiate Church (2 vacancies)
Party	Candidate	Votes	%	±%
Labour	B. S. Langton	1,237	46.2	+34.3
Labour	R. Finkel	1,174	43.9	+32.0
Liberal	M. Fidler	590	22.0	−17.6
Conservative	G. W. G. Fitzsimons	555	20.7	N/A
Conservative	A. Lees*	526	19.7	N/A
Independent	J. R. Gouldman	295	11.0	−37.5
Majority		584	21.9	
Turnout		2,677	43.3	
Labour gain from Conservative		Swing		
Labour gain from Conservative		Swing		

=== Collyhurst ===
Collyhurst (2 vacancies)
Party	Candidate	Votes	%	±%
Labour	R. Malcolm*	1,962	55.1	−32.5
Labour	M. Tylecote*	1,925	54.0	−33.6
Conservative	T. Smith	804	22.6	N/A
Communist	S. Wild	796	22.4	N/A
Majority		1,121	31.4	−43.8
Turnout		3,562		
Labour hold		Swing		
Labour hold		Swing		

=== Crumpsall ===
Crumpsall (2 vacancies)
Party	Candidate	Votes	%	±%
Labour	J. P. Jennings	3,091	38.9	+7.9
Conservative	G. C. Roberts*	3,032	38.2	N/A
Conservative	R. Renshaw	3,021	38.0	N/A
Labour	H. Broderick	2,986	37.6	+6.6
Liberal	C. Hughes*	1,824	22.9	−46.1
Majority		11	0.1	
Turnout		7,947	43.0	
Labour gain from Liberal		Swing		
Conservative hold		Swing		

=== Didsbury ===
Didsbury
Party	Candidate	Votes	%	±%
Conservative	E. Hill*	5,807	62.4	−5.9
Labour	F. Taylor	3,494	37.6	+5.9
Majority		2,313	24.8	−11.8
Turnout		9,301	40.1	
Conservative hold		Swing		

=== Exchange ===
Exchange
Party	Candidate	Votes	%	±%
Conservative	T. E. Bird*	253	88.8	N/A
Labour	M. C. Toner	32	11.2	N/A
Majority		221	77.6	N/A
Turnout		285	71.1	
Conservative hold		Swing		

=== Gorton North ===
Gorton North (2 vacancies)
Party	Candidate	Votes	%	±%
Labour	F. Lord*	4,660	75.0	N/A
Labour	C. Bentley*	4,610	74.2	N/A
Conservative	C. Parker	1,551	25.0	N/A
Majority		3,059	49.2	N/A
Turnout		6,211	39.5	
Labour hold		Swing		
Labour hold		Swing		

=== Gorton South ===
Gorton South (2 vacancies)
Party	Candidate	Votes	%	±%
Labour	G. R. Leslie*	4,417	73.3	−20.6
Labour	E. Kirkman	4,388	72.8	−21.1
Conservative	R. A. Fieldhouse	1,610	26.7	N/A
Majority		2,778	46.1	−41.7
Turnout		6,027	31.9	
Labour hold		Swing		
Labour hold		Swing		

=== Harpurhey ===
Harpurhey
Party	Candidate	Votes	%	±%
Labour	H. P. J. Hinderer	3,408	55.7	+6.1
Conservative	C. F. Howarth*	2,713	44.3	−6.1
Majority		695	11.4	
Turnout		6,121	46.5	
Labour gain from Conservative		Swing		

=== Levenshulme ===
Levenshulme (3 vacancies)
Party	Candidate	Votes	%	±%
Conservative	J. Bowes*	3,821	35.2	−27.0
Conservative	O. Lodge*	3,786	34.9	−27.3
Liberal	C. R. de la Wyche*	3,721	34.3	N/A
Labour	C. Bamber	2,801	25.8	−12.0
Labour	M. Geliher	2,754	25.4	−12.4
Labour	V. Wilson	2,613	24.1	−13.7
Ind. Labour Party	F. Hatton	499	4.6	N/A
Ind. Labour Party	W. Kelly	323	3.0	N/A
Majority		920	8.5	
Turnout		10,842	72.7	
Conservative hold		Swing		
Conservative hold		Swing		
Liberal hold		Swing		

=== Longsight ===
Longsight (2 vacancies)
Party	Candidate	Votes	%	±%
Conservative	E. Elliot*	4,006	51.2	−8.1
Conservative	H. Sharp*	3,892	49.7	−9.6
Labour	D. Rock	3,820	48.8	+8.1
Labour	G. Whalley	3,732	47.7	+7.0
Majority		72	0.9	−17.7
Turnout		7,826	41.9	
Conservative hold		Swing		
Conservative hold		Swing		

=== Medlock Street ===
Medlock Street
Party	Candidate	Votes	%	±%
Labour	A. Littlemore*	1,611	58.2	+6.5
Conservative	C. Brewster	991	34.6	−11.9
Residents	R. Frere	266	9.3	N/A
Majority		620	21.6	+16.4
Turnout		2,868		
Labour hold		Swing		

=== Miles Platting ===
Miles Platting
Party	Candidate	Votes	%	±%
Labour	W. F. Irvine*	2,627	64.3	+11.7
Conservative	A. H. Ball	1,461	35.7	−11.7
Majority		1,166	28.6	+23.4
Turnout		4,088	39.8	
Labour hold		Swing		

=== Moss Side East ===
Moss Side East
Party	Candidate	Votes	%	±%
Labour	T. Knowles	1,914	51.4	+16.0
Conservative	H. A. E. Ramsden*	1,389	37.3	−0.4
Residents	A. M. Edwards	423	11.3	−15.6
Majority		525	14.1	
Turnout		3,726	31.7	
Labour gain from Conservative		Swing		

=== Moss Side West ===
Moss Side West
Party	Candidate	Votes	%	±%
Labour	N. G. Atkinson	2,235	45.6	+14.0
Conservative	D. Gosling*	2,055	41.9	N/A
Independent	G. J. Playford	397	8.1	N/A
Independent	A. C. Halliday	213	4.4	N/A
Majority		180	3.7	
Turnout		4,900	34.5	
Labour gain from Conservative		Swing		

=== Moston ===
Moston
Party	Candidate	Votes	%	±%
Labour	C. C. Lamb	5,225	58.5	+4.9
Conservative	H. F. Johnston*	2,417	27.1	−19.3
Liberal	H. Kevin Armitage	1,285	14.4	N/A
Majority		2,808	31.5	+24.3
Turnout		8,927	42.1	
Labour gain from Conservative		Swing		

=== New Cross ===
New Cross
Party	Candidate	Votes	%	±%
Labour	L. M. Lever*	3,011	88.5	+53.1
Independent	J. A. Gannon	393	11.5	N/A
Majority		2,618	76.9	+75.8
Turnout		3,404	39.4	
Labour hold		Swing		

=== Newton Heath ===
Newton Heath (2 vacancies)
Party	Candidate	Votes	%	±%
Labour	A. Eyres	3,743	65.2	+11.6
Labour	J. Hellier*	3,708	64.6	+11.0
Conservative	W. H. Priestnall	1,999	34.8	−11.6
Conservative	A. Turner	1,936	33.7	−12.7
Majority		1,709	29.8	+22.6
Turnout		5,742	37.2	
Labour hold		Swing		
Labour hold		Swing		

=== Openshaw ===
Openshaw
Party	Candidate	Votes	%	±%
Labour	R. Moss*	3,614	79.7	N/A
Conservative	L. H. Nesbitt	917	20.2	N/A
Majority		2,697	59.5	N/A
Turnout		4,531	35.0	
Labour hold		Swing		

=== Oxford ===
Oxford (2 vacancies)
Party	Candidate	Votes	%	±%
Conservative	G. B. Cary	401	85.3	N/A
Conservative	S. A. Gradwell*	397	84.5	N/A
Labour	B. Starkie	69	14.7	N/A
Labour	R. Thomas	69	14.7	N/A
Majority		328	69.8	N/A
Turnout		470		
Conservative hold		Swing		
Conservative hold		Swing		

=== Rusholme ===
Rusholme
Party	Candidate	Votes	%	±%
Conservative	H. Stockdale	3,402	54.8	−8.8
Labour	A. B. Horan	2,479	40.0	+5.6
Liberal	A. E. Sherlock*	322	5.2	N/A
Majority		923	14.8	−16.4
Turnout		6,203	39.2	
Conservative gain from Liberal		Swing		

=== St. Ann's ===
St. Ann's (2 vacancies)
Party	Candidate	Votes	%	±%
Conservative	W. J. Pegge*	515	90.0	N/A
Conservative	H. Marshall*	515	90.0	N/A
Labour	S. Beaven	57	10.0	N/A
Labour	N. Randolph	57	10.0	N/A
Majority		458	80.0	N/A
Turnout		572		
Conservative hold		Swing		
Conservative hold		Swing		

=== St. Clement's ===
St. Clement's (2 vacancies)
Party	Candidate	Votes	%	±%
Conservative	J. L. Cobon*	338	44.1	N/A
Liberal	A. E. Smith*	291	38.0	N/A
Labour	W. Newton	137	17.9	N/A
Labour	L. Palethorpe	128	16.7	N/A
Majority		154	20.1	N/A
Turnout		766		
Conservative hold		Swing		
Liberal hold		Swing		

=== St. George's ===
St. George's
Party	Candidate	Votes	%	±%
Labour	R. E. Thomas*	2,293	57.3	+14.0
Conservative	J. R. Sorenson	1,518	38.0	−15.4
Residents	H. B. Frere	174	4.4	N/A
Independent	L. Weathers	14	0.4	N/A
Majority		775	19.3	
Turnout		3,999	35.4	
Labour hold		Swing		

=== St. John's ===
St. John's (2 vacancies)
Party	Candidate	Votes	%	±%
Conservative	J. E. Burgess*	598	63.2	N/A
Conservative	H. Harker	515	54.4	N/A
Labour	J. Clarkson	208	22.0	N/A
Labour	F. Wain	189	20.0	N/A
Liberal	G. Davies*	141	14.9	N/A
Liberal	F. E. Doran	115	11.9	N/A
Majority		307	32.4	
Turnout		947	55.4	
Conservative hold		Swing		
Conservative gain from Liberal		Swing		

=== St. Luke's ===
St. Luke's (2 vacancies)
Party	Candidate	Votes	%	±%
Labour	T. Ball	1,842	45.5	+10.2
Labour	J. H. Alsop	1,832	45.2	+9.9
Conservative	C. V. Jarvis*	1,661	41.0	−2.7
Conservative	J. H. Willis	1,624	40.1	−3.6
Liberal	O. Heggs*	548	13.5	−6.6
Liberal	J. E. Moore	512	12.6	−7.5
Residents	E. Hutchinson	73	1.8	+0.9
Majority		171	4.2	
Turnout		4,051	27.1	
Labour gain from Conservative		Swing		
Labour gain from Liberal		Swing		

=== St. Mark's ===
St. Mark's (2 vacancies)
Party	Candidate	Votes	%	±%
Labour	T. M. Larrad*	3,238	65.1	N/A
Labour	H. Eastwood	3,067	61.6	N/A
Conservative	W. Sharp	1,738	34.9	N/A
Majority		1,329	26.7	N/A
Turnout		4,976	37.2	
Labour hold		Swing		
Labour hold		Swing		

=== St. Michael's ===
St. Michael's
Party	Candidate	Votes	%	±%
Labour	A. Donovan*	1,964	78.6	+32.2
Conservative	S. Taylor	536	21.4	−25.0
Majority		1,428	57.2	+56.2
Turnout		2,500		
Labour hold		Swing		

=== Withington ===
Withington (2 vacancies)
Party	Candidate	Votes	%	±%
Conservative	G. Lord*	6,555	44.2	−16.5
Conservative	H. Bentley*	6,297	42.5	−18.2
Labour	F. H. Robinson	6,178	41.7	+2.4
Labour	E. C. Gates	5,909	39.8	+0.5
Liberal	C. A. Curtis	2,101	14.2	N/A
Liberal	F. R. Cann	1,918	12.9	N/A
Majority		119	0.8	−20.6
Turnout		14,834	40.2	
Conservative hold		Swing		
Conservative hold		Swing		

=== Wythenshawe ===
Wythenshawe
Party	Candidate	Votes	%	±%
Labour	W. Frost	7,303	62.9	+12.0
Conservative	W. Walton	4,300	37.1	−12.0
Majority		3,003	25.8	+24.0
Turnout		11,603	41.2	
Labour hold		Swing		

== Aldermanic elections ==
=== Aldermanic election, 9 November 1945 ===
Caused by the death on 25 October 1945 of Alderman Annie Lee (Labour, elected as an alderman by the council on 10 June 1936).

In her place, Councillor William Oldfield M.P. (Labour, Openshaw, elected 17 July 1928) was elected as an alderman by the council on 9 November 1945.

Party	Alderman	Ward	Term expires
Labour	William Oldfield M.P.	All Saints'	1946

=== Aldermanic election, 5 June 1946 ===
Caused by the death on 26 April 1946 of Alderman Thomas Ackroyd (Liberal, elected as an alderman by the council on 9 November 1939).

In his place, Councillor Andrew Cathcart (Labour, St. Michael's, elected 1 November 1928) was elected as an alderman by the council on 5 June 1946.

Party	Alderman	Ward	Term expires
Labour	Andrew Cathcart	Medlock Street	1946

== By-elections between 1945 and 1946 ==
=== Openshaw, 6 December 1945 ===
Caused by the election as an alderman of Councillor William Oldfield (Labour, Openshaw, elected 17 July 1928) on 9 November 1945 following the death on 25 October 1945 of Alderman Annie Lee (Labour, elected as an alderman by the council on 10 June 1936).

Openshaw
Party	Candidate	Votes	%	±%
Labour	L. Thomas	1,990	81.1	+1.4
Residents	R. Frere	464	18.9	N/A
Majority		1,526	62.2	+2.7
Turnout		2,454		
Labour hold		Swing		

=== Longsight, 31 January 1946 ===
Caused by the death of Councillor William Griffin (Conservative, Longsight, elected 20 December 1932) on 22 December 1945.

Longsight
Party	Candidate	Votes	%	±%
Conservative	J. G. Hopkins	2,990	55.3	+4.1
Labour	G. Whalley	2,421	44.7	−4.1
Majority		569	10.4	+9.5
Turnout		5,411		
Conservative hold		Swing		
