= Bob Thomas (Labour politician) =

British Labour politician, Leader of Manchester City Council

Sir Bob Thomas JP

Leader of Greater Manchester County Council
- In office 1 April 1974 – 5 May 1977
- Preceded by: Office established
- Succeeded by: Arnold Fieldhouse

Leader of Manchester City Council
- In office 20 December 1956 – 22 May 1962
- Preceded by: Tom Nally
- Succeeded by: Maurice Pariser
- In office 3 November 1965 – 12 May 1967
- Preceded by: Maurice Pariser
- Succeeded by: Robert Rodgers
- In office 14 May 1971 – 26 April 1973
- Preceded by: Arnold Fieldhouse
- Succeeded by: Joe Dean
Political offices
Leader of the Labour group on Greater Manchester County Council
In office 26 April 1973 – 5 May 1977
Preceded by	Office established
Succeeded by	Bernard Clarke
Leader of the Labour group on Manchester City Council
In office 20 December 1956 – 22 May 1962
Preceded by	Tom Nally
Succeeded by	Maurice Pariser
In office 3 November 1965 – 26 April 1973
Preceded by	Maurice Pariser
Succeeded by	Joe Dean
Leader of the Opposition on Manchester City Council
In office 12 May 1967 – 14 May 1971
Preceded by	Robert Rodgers
Succeeded by	Arnold Fieldhouse
Council offices
Member of Greater Manchester County Council for Manchester No.8
In office 12 April 1973 – 5 May 1977
Preceded by	Office established
Succeeded by	Andrew Fender
Alderman of Manchester City Council
In office 9 January 1957 – 1 April 1974
Preceded by	Tom Nally
Succeeded by	Office abolished
Member of Manchester City Council for St. George's ward
In office 5 January 1944 – 9 January 1957
Preceded by	Charles Beamand
Succeeded by	Eric Mellor

Personal details
- Born: Robert Evan Thomas; October 8, 1901 Ince-in-Makerfield, Lancashire, England
- Died: 17 April 2004 (aged 102) Manchester, Greater Manchester, England
- Party: Labour

Sir Robert Evan Thomas JP (8 October 1901 - 17 April 2004) was a British politician and trade unionist who served as Leader of Manchester City Council for three terms between 1956 and 1973. A member of the Labour Party, he was also leader of Greater Manchester County Council from 1974 to 1977.

== Early life and career ==
Robert Evan Thomas was born on 8 October 1901 in Ince-in-Makerfield, Lancashire, he was the youngest of five children born to parents from North Wales.

At the age of 14, Thomas began working in a coal mine before serving eighteen months in the army after the end of the First World War. In 1924, he became a bus driver, work that led him to become an official in the Transport and General Workers' Union (TGWU), acting as the union's passenger secretary in Manchester. In April 1940, he formed part of a deputation to Manchester City Council which protested against the introduction of women ticket-inspectors on the city's buses. Thomas retired from the TGWU in 1955.

== Local politics ==
On 12 May 1943, Thomas was elected as acting secretary of the Labour Party on Manchester City Council. Later that year, he was nominated by the Labour Party to fill a vacancy on the council created by the death of Councillor Charles Beamand and became a councillor for St. George's ward on 5 January 1944. He was successfully elected in that ward in the 1945 local elections.

In 1947, Thomas became the chairman of the council's Markets Committee, and he would go on to serve as chairman of several other committees. When Tom Nally, leader of the controlling Labour group, died in December 1956, Thomas became his successor as both group leader and city alderman.

As the de facto leader of the council, Thomas oversaw the continuation of inner-city slum clearance, the introduction of comprehensive education in Manchester and the introduction of air-control zones to combat air pollution in the city. The end of Thomas' first period as leader was marked by a backlash over rising local rates and the formation of the Manchester Ratepayers' Party which won more than 7,000 votes in the 1960 local elections. In 1962-63 Municipal year, Thomas served as Lord Mayor of Manchester and resigned the leadership of the Labour group, Alderman Maurice Pariser succeeded him. Three years later, Alderman Pariser resigned the Labour group leadership on health grounds and Thomas was once again elected group leader.

On 14 February 1967, Thomas was knighted as part of the 1967 New Year Honours for services to Local Government in Manchester. Months later, Labour lost control of Manchester City Council to the Conservatives for the first time in fourteen years. Manchester Labour continued to lose seats on the council in a period when the Labour government of Harold Wilson had become deeply unpopular, in 1968 Labour won just eight seats out of forty-one. Thomas led Labour back to power in Manchester in the 1971 local elections when all of the seats on the city council were up for election. The election resulted in the city Labour Party winning its greatest number of seats to that point.

The Local Government Act 1972 abolished the Manchester Corporation and replaced it with a new authority covering an almost identical area. The Act also created the county of Greater Manchester which would take over many powers previously enjoyed by the corporation. Thomas was elected to the Greater Manchester County Council in 1973 in Manchester No.8 ward (which included his former ward of St. George's) and became leader of the new region.

Thomas retired from politics before the next set of elections to the county and Greater Manchester was gained by the Conservatives. The Guardian speculated that Labour's defeat was brought about by the failure to materialise motorway expansion and the cancellation of the Picc-Vic tunnel, both projects championed by Thomas.

== Personal life ==
Thomas married Edna Isherwood in 1924, they had two children together.

He died on 17 April 2004 at the age of 102.
