= Mobberley Approved School =

Mobberley Approved School, Knoll Green Knutsford was established by Manchester City Council in 1936. It accommodated 104 boys from ages 13 to 15 on admission. James Alexander was the headmaster. He was also editor of the Approved Schools Gazette and a boxing enthusiast. The school participated in boxing, football, table tennis, cross country, and cricket competitions.

In 1953 Alexander was elected President of the Association of Headmasters, Headmistresses, and Matrons of Approved Schools.

In 1959 the Home Office requested an increase in numbers from 104 to 120. In that year 78 boys gained certificates for proficiency in athletics, and 28 earning swimming certificates. Two after-care officers worked from the school. In 1960 they had a total caseload of 442. Mr. Alexander, who started his career at Desford approved school in 1921, retired in 1961. He noted that since he arrived in 1936 1624 boys had passed through the school.

Mr. Berry, the new head, replaced the children's corduroy shorts with jeans, introduced a house system, reduced the emphasis on boxing and introduced choral singing, which was surprisingly successful.

In 1973, it became a Community Home with Education, still under the control of Manchester City Council. It closed in 1986.
