= Whalley Range (ward) =

- Ward
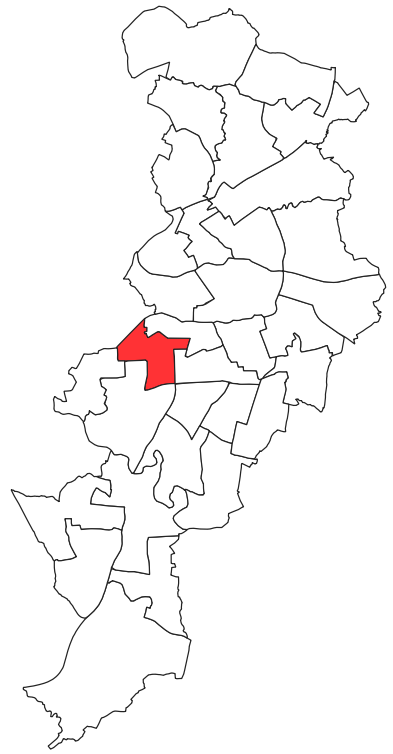
- Whalley Range ward (2018) within Manchester

- Coat of arms
- Country: United Kingdom
- Constituent country: England
- Region: North West England
- County: Greater Manchester
- Metropolitan borough: Manchester
- Created: May 1982
- Named for: Whalley Range

Government
  - Type: Unicameral
  - Body: Manchester City Council
- UK Parliamentary Constituency: Manchester Rusholme

Whalley Range is an electoral division of Manchester City Council which has been represented since 1982. It covers the South Manchester suburb of Whalley Range.

== Overview ==
Whalley Range ward was created in 1982, covering the western portion of the former Alexandra ward. In 2004, the area of Alexandra Park was transferred to the ward. At the latest revision in 2018, that part of the Fallowfield ward to the west of Princess Road was transferred to the ward, while the southwestern portion of the ward was transferred to the Chorlton Park ward.

From its creation until 1983, the ward formed part of the Manchester Moss Side Parliamentary constituency. From 1983 and 1997, it was part of the Stretford Parliamentary constituency. From 1997 until 2010, it was part of the Manchester Central Parliamentary constituency. From 2010 until 2024, it was part of the Manchester Gorton Parliamentary constituency. Since 2024, it has formed part of the Manchester Rusholme Parliamentary constituency.

== Councillors ==
| Election | Councillor | Councillor | Councillor |
|---|---|---|---|
| 1982 | R. C. Rodgers (Con) | A. Neville (Con) | M. Whetton (Con) |
| September 1982 | L. Meadowcroft (Con) | A. Neville (Con) | M. Whetton (Con) |
| 1983 | L. Meadowcroft (Con) | A. Neville (Con) | M. Whetton (Con) |
| 1984 | L. Meadowcroft (Con) | C. McQuade (Con) | M. Whetton (Con) |
| 1986 | J. C. Morris (Lab) | C. McQuade (Con) | M. Whetton (Con) |
| 1987 | J. C. Morris (Lab) | C. McQuade (Con) | J. Kershaw (Con) |
| 1988 | J. C. Morris (Lab) | K. M. Fry (Lab) | J. Kershaw (Con) |
| 1990 | J. C. Morris (Lab) | K. M. Fry (Lab) | J. Kershaw (Con) |
| 1991 | J. C. Morris (Lab) | K. M. Fry (Lab) | H. Johnson (Lab) |
| 1992 | J. C. Morris (Lab) | K. M. Fry (Lab) | H. Johnson (Lab) |
| 1994 | B. Stone (Lab) | K. M. Fry (Lab) | H. Johnson (Lab) |
| 1995 | B. Stone (Lab) | K. M. Fry (Lab) | D. Rathbone (Lab) |
| 1996 | B. Stone (Lab) | K. M. Fry (Lab) | D. Rathbone (Lab) |
| 1998 | B. Stone (Lab) | K. M. Fry (Lab) | D. Rathbone (Lab) |
| 1999 | B. Stone (Lab) | K. M. Fry (Lab) | P. Cruthers (Lab) |
| 2000 | B. Stone (Lab) | K. M. Fry (Lab) | P. Cruthers (Lab) |
| June 2001 | B. Stone (Lab) | K. M. Fry (Lab) | A. Dale (Lab) |
| 2002 | B. Stone (Lab) | K. M. Fry (Lab) | A. Dale (Lab) |
| 2003 | B. Stone (Lab) | K. M. Fry (Lab) | J. Grant (Lib Dem) |
| 2004 | John Grant (Lib Dem) | Faraz Bhatti (Lib Dem) | Joy Winder (Lib Dem) |
| 2006 | John Grant (Lib Dem) | Faraz Bhatti (Lib Dem) | Mary Watson (Lab) |
| 2007 | John Grant (Lib Dem) | Faraz Bhatti (Lib Dem) | Mary Watson (Lab) |
| January 2008 | John Grant (Lib Dem) | Faraz Bhatti (Con) | Mary Watson (Lab) |
| 2008 | John Grant (Lib Dem) | Faraz Bhatti (Con) | Mary Watson (Lab) |
| 2010 | John Grant (Lib Dem) | Faraz Bhatti (Con) | Mary Watson (Lab) |
| August 2010 | John Grant (Lib Dem) | Faraz Bhatti (Ind) | Mary Watson (Lab) |
| 2011 | John Grant (Lib Dem) | Aftab Razaq (Lab) | Mary Watson (Lab) |
| 2012 | Angeliki Stogia (Lab) | Aftab Razaq (Lab) | Mary Watson (Lab) |
| 2014 | Angeliki Stogia (Lab) | Aftab Razaq (Lab) | Mary Watson (Lab) |
| 2015 | Angeliki Stogia (Lab) | Aftab Razaq (Lab) | Mary Watson (Lab) |
| 2016 | Angeliki Stogia (Lab) | Aftab Razaq (Lab) | Mary Watson (Lab) |
| 2018 | Aftab Razaq (Lab) | Mary Watson (Lab) | Angeliki Stogia (Lab) |
| 2019 | Aftab Razaq (Lab) | Mary Watson (Lab) | Angeliki Stogia (Lab) |
| 2021 | Aftab Razaq (Lab) | Muqaddasah Bano (Lab) | Angeliki Stogia (Lab) |
| 2022 | Aftab Razaq (Lab) | Muqaddasah Bano (Lab) | Angeliki Stogia (Lab) |
| 2023 | Aftab Razaq (Lab) | Muqaddasah Bano (Lab) | Angeliki Stogia (Lab) |
| 2024 | Aftab Razaq (Lab) | Muqaddasah Bano (Lab) | Angeliki Stogia (Lab) |
| 2026 | Ati Zafar (Grn) | Muqaddasah Bano (Lab) | Angeliki Stogia (Lab) |

== Elections ==
=== Elections in 2020s ===
==== May 2026 ====
2026
| Party | Candidate | Votes | % | ±% |
|---|---|---|---|---|
| Green | Ati Zafar | 2,498 | 53.9 | +32.8 |
| Labour | Aftab Razaq* | 1,407 | 30.3 | −37.7 |
| Workers Party | Sameera Ashraf | 266 | 5.7 | N/A |
| Reform | Lee Montague-Trenchard | 206 | 4.4 | N/A |
| Liberal Democrats | Seb Bate | 135 | 2.9 | −2.2 |
| Conservative | Andrew Chadwick | 124 | 2.7 | −2.4 |
| Majority | | 1,091 | 23.5 | N/A |
| Turnout | | 4,636 | 38.2 | +8.3 |
| Green gain from Labour | | Swing | | |

==== May 2024 ====
2024
| Party | Candidate | Votes | % | ±% |
|---|---|---|---|---|
| Labour | Muqaddasah Bano* | 2,084 | 50.6 | 17.7 ▼ |
| Green | Billie Nagle | 980 | 23.8 | 0.1 ▼ |
| Workers Party | Tanvir Marth | 669 | 16.2 | New |
| Liberal Democrats | Seb Bate | 180 | 4.4 | 1.8 ▲ |
| Conservative | Norman Hesketh-Hart | 160 | 3.9 | 1.4 ▼ |
| Majority | | 1,104 | 26.8 | |
| Rejected ballots | | 46 | 1.1 | |
| Turnout | | 4,119 | 34.5 | |
| Registered electors | | 11,948 | | |
| Labour hold | | Swing | 8.8 ▼ | |

==== May 2023 ====
2023
| Party | Candidate | Votes | % | ±% |
|---|---|---|---|---|
| Labour | Angeliki Stogia* | 2,379 | 69.0 | 0.1 ▼ |
| Green | Laura Potter | 765 | 22.2 | 0.9 ▲ |
| Conservative | Praveen Tomar | 173 | 5.0 | 1.6 ▲ |
| Liberal Democrats | Seb Bate | 132 | 3.8 | 1.8 ▼ |
| Majority | | 1,614 | | |
| Rejected ballots | | 24 | | |
| Turnout | | | 30.4 | |
| Registered electors | | 11,444 | | |
| Labour hold | | Swing | | |

==== May 2022 ====
2022
| Party | Candidate | Votes | % | ±% |
|---|---|---|---|---|
| Labour | Aftab Razaq* | 2,318 | 68.0 | 7.6 ▲ |
| Green | Laura Potter | 721 | 21.1 | 13.3 ▼ |
| Liberal Democrats | Andrew McGuinness | 174 | 5.1 | 1.9 ▲ |
| Conservative | Muhammad Shahid | 173 | 5.1 | 1.7 ▲ |
| Majority | | 1,597 | 46.9 | |
| Rejected ballots | | 24 | | |
| Turnout | | 3,410 | 29.9 | 4.3 ▲ |
| Registered electors | | 11,424 | | |
| Labour hold | | Swing | 10.5 ▲ | |

==== May 2021 ====
2021
| Party | Candidate | Votes | % | ±% |
|---|---|---|---|---|
| Labour | Muqaddasah Bano | 2,733 | 68.3 | 4.1 ▲ |
| Green | Beth McManus | 955 | 23.9 | 5.2 ▼ |
| Conservative | Andrew Tang | 210 | 5.3 | 1.7 ▲ |
| Liberal Democrats | Andrew McGuinness | 102 | 2.6 | 0.5 ▼ |
| Majority | | 1,778 | 44.4 | |
| Rejected ballots | | 30 | 0.7 | |
| Turnout | | 4,030 | 34.6 | 2.3 ▼ |
| Registered electors | | 11,649 | | |
| Labour hold | | Swing | 4.7 ▲ | |

=== Elections in 2010s ===
==== May 2019 ====
2019
| Party | Candidate | Votes | % | ±% |
|---|---|---|---|---|
| Labour Co-op | Angeliki Stogia* | 2,524 | 69.1 | ▲12.5 |
| Green | Eliza Tyrell | 777 | 21.3 | ▼5.3 |
| Liberal Democrats | Philip Manktelow | 199 | 5.4 | ▲2.6 |
| Conservative | David Semple | 123 | 3.4 | ▲0.1 |
| Majority | | 1,747 | 47.8 | ▲22.2 |
| Rejected ballots | | 32 | 0.88 | |
| Turnout | | 3,655 | 33.19 | ▼3.7 |
| Registered electors | | 11,013 | | |
| Labour Co-op hold | | Swing | ▲8.9 | |

==== May 2018 ====
2018 (3 vacancies; new boundaries)
| Party | Candidate | Votes | % | ±% |
|---|---|---|---|---|
| Labour | Aftab Razaq* | 2,483 | 60.4 | |
| Labour | Mary Watson* | 2,379 | 57.9 | |
| Labour | Angeliki Stogia* | 2,327 | 56.6 | |
| Green | Issy Patience | 1,414 | 34.4 | |
| Green | Matt Schriebke | 958 | 23.3 | |
| Green | Stephanie Wyatt | 885 | 21.5 | |
| Conservative | Amber Lister-Geddes | 140 | 3.4 | |
| Conservative | James Ranger | 137 | 3.3 | |
| Liberal Democrats | Jane McQueen | 136 | 3.3 | |
| Liberal Democrats | Samantha Magill | 130 | 3.2 | |
| Conservative | Lee McGrath | 128 | 3.1 | |
| Liberal Democrats | Mark Smith | 81 | 2.0 | |
| Majority | | 1,069 | 25.6 | |
| Turnout | | 4,111 | 36.9 | |
| Labour win (new boundaries) | | | | |
| Labour win (new boundaries) | | | | |
| Labour win (new boundaries) | | | | |

==== May 2016 ====
2016
| Party | Candidate | Votes | % | ±% |
|---|---|---|---|---|
| Labour | Angeliki Stogia* | 3,091 | 63.8 | −1.9 |
| Green | Ben Godfrey | 1,321 | 27.2 | +16.1 |
| Conservative | David Robert Semple | 223 | 4.6 | +1.3 |
| Liberal Democrats | Rhona Eva Elizabeth Cowan Brown | 169 | 3.5 | −16.3 |
| TUSC | Liam David | 45 | 0.9 | n/a |
| Majority | | 1,770 | 36.5 | |
| Turnout | | 4,849 | 44.52 | |
| Labour hold | | Swing | | |

==== May 2015 ====
2015
| Party | Candidate | Votes | % | ±% |
|---|---|---|---|---|
| Labour | Aftab Razaq* | 4,421 | 60.7 | −6.1 |
| Green | Mary Rosalind Candeland | 1,607 | 22.1 | +9.5 |
| Liberal Democrats | Rhona Brown | 590 | 8.1 | −5.6 |
| Conservative | Amjad Nasir | 509 | 7.0 | 0 |
| TUSC | Karen Reissmann | 160 | 2.2 | N/A |
| Majority | | 2,814 | 38.6 | |
| Turnout | | 7,287 | 63.5 | +23.1 |
| Labour hold | | Swing | | |

==== May 2014 ====
2014
| Party | Candidate | Votes | % | ±% |
|---|---|---|---|---|
| Labour | Mary Rose Watson* | 2,959 | 64.31 | |
| Green | Mary Candeland | 883 | 19.19 | |
| Liberal Democrats | John Grant | 475 | 10.32 | |
| Conservative | Shahed Hossain | 284 | 6.17 | |
| Majority | | 2,076 | 45.1 | |
| Turnout | | 4,601 | 39.43 | |
| Labour hold | | Swing | | |

==== May 2012 ====
2012
| Party | Candidate | Votes | % | ±% |
|---|---|---|---|---|
| Labour | Angeliki Stogia | 2,517 | 65.7 | +36.0 |
| Liberal Democrats | John Grant* | 759 | 19.8 | −19.5 |
| Green | Mary Candeland | 426 | 11.1 | +2.2 |
| Conservative | Amjad Nasir | 127 | 3.3 | −18.8 |
| Majority | | 1,758 | 46 | |
| Turnout | | 3,829 | 33.4 | |
| Labour gain from Liberal Democrats | | Swing | | |

==== May 2011 ====
2011
| Party | Candidate | Votes | % | ±% |
|---|---|---|---|---|
| Labour | Aftab Razaq | 3,050 | 66.8 | +31.8 |
| Liberal Democrats | Michael Chubb | 625 | 13.7 | −36.5 |
| Green | Ayo Ogolo | 574 | 12.6 | +2.9 |
| Conservative | Nathan Cruddas | 318 | 7.0 | +1.9 |
| Majority | | 2,425 | 53.1 | |
| Turnout | | 4,567 | 40.4 | |
| Labour gain from Independent | | Swing | | |

==== May 2010 ====
2010
| Party | Candidate | Votes | % | ±% |
|---|---|---|---|---|
| Labour | Mary Rose Watson* | 3,137 | 46.5 | +16.8 |
| Liberal Democrats | Mohammed Sajjad | 2,330 | 34.6 | −4.7 |
| Green | Mary Rosalind Candeland | 556 | 8.2 | −0.7 |
| Conservative | Sophia Fox-Miles | 552 | 8.2 | −13.9 |
| Respect | Mohammed Zulfikar | 166 | 2.5 | +2.5 |
| Majority | | 807 | 12.0 | +2.4 |
| Turnout | | 6,741 | 61.4 | +20.9 |
| Labour hold | | Swing | +10.7 | |

=== Elections in 2000s ===
==== May 2008 ====
2008
| Party | Candidate | Votes | % | ±% |
|---|---|---|---|---|
| Liberal Democrats | John Grant* | 1,683 | 39.3 | −10.9 |
| Labour | Amina Lone | 1,271 | 29.7 | −5.3 |
| Conservative | Fawad Hussain | 945 | 22.1 | +17.0 |
| Green | Mary Candeland | 381 | 8.9 | −0.8 |
| Majority | | 412 | 9.6 | −5.5 |
| Turnout | | 4,280 | 40.5 | +1.5 |
| Liberal Democrats hold | | Swing | -8.1 | |

==== May 2007 ====
2007
| Party | Candidate | Votes | % | ±% |
|---|---|---|---|---|
| Liberal Democrats | Faraz Bhatti* | 2,030 | 50.2 | +17.6 |
| Labour | Kath Fry | 1,418 | 35.0 | −11.1 |
| Green | Mary Candeland | 393 | 9.7 | −3.4 |
| Conservative | Tim Langley | 206 | 5.1 | −3.0 |
| Majority | | 612 | 15.1 | +1.6 |
| Turnout | | 4,047 | 39.0 | +4.5 |
| Liberal Democrats hold | | Swing | +14.3 | |

==== May 2006 ====
2006
| Party | Candidate | Votes | % | ±% |
|---|---|---|---|---|
| Labour | Mary Rose Watson | 1,637 | 46.1 | +17.4 |
| Liberal Democrats | Joy Ruth Winder* | 1,158 | 32.6 | −6.6 |
| Green | Mary Rosalind Candeland | 466 | 13.1 | +0.6 |
| Conservative | Matthew Graham Cox | 289 | 8.1 | −11.5 |
| Majority | | 479 | 13.5 | +2.9 |
| Turnout | | 3,550 | 34.5 | −9.3 |
| Labour gain from Liberal Democrats | | Swing | +12.0 | |

==== June 2004 ====
2004 (3 vacancies; new boundaries)
| Party | Candidate | Votes | % | ±% |
|---|---|---|---|---|
| Liberal Democrats | John Grant* | 1,999 | 45.0 | |
| Liberal Democrats | Faraz Bhatti | 1,943 | 43.7 | |
| Liberal Democrats | Joy Winder | 1,650 | 37.1 | |
| Labour | Kath Fry* | 1,459 | 32.8 | |
| Labour | Aftab Ahmed | 1,437 | 32.3 | |
| Labour | Tony Dale* | 1,363 | 30.7 | |
| Conservative | Melody Leroy | 998 | 22.4 | |
| Green | Helen Dolan | 638 | 14.3 | |
| Green | Mary Candeland | 563 | 12.7 | |
| Green | Robin Goater | 545 | 12.3 | |
| Conservative | Matthew Cox | 370 | 8.3 | |
| Conservative | Richard West | 282 | 6.3 | |
| Majority | | 191 | 4.3 | |
| Turnout | | 4,446 | 43.8 | |
| Liberal Democrats win (new seat) | | | | |
| Liberal Democrats win (new seat) | | | | |
| Liberal Democrats win (new seat) | | | | |

==== May 2003 ====
2003
| Party | Candidate | Votes | % | ±% |
|---|---|---|---|---|
| Liberal Democrats | John Grant | 1,491 | 49.1 | +19.3 |
| Labour | Christopher Paul | 1,024 | 33.7 | −16.2 |
| Green | Mary Candeland | 276 | 9.1 | +0.0 |
| Conservative | Richard West | 248 | 8.2 | −3.0 |
| Majority | | 467 | 15.4 | −4.7 |
| Turnout | | 3,039 | 30.6 | −0.4 |
| Liberal Democrats gain from Labour | | Swing | +17.7 | |

==== May 2002 ====
2002
| Party | Candidate | Votes | % | ±% |
|---|---|---|---|---|
| Labour | Bernard Stone* | 1,595 | 49.9 | −6.4 |
| Liberal Democrats | John Grant | 953 | 29.8 | +19.9 |
| Conservative | Nicholas Davis | 359 | 11.2 | −16.0 |
| Green | Mary Candeland | 290 | 9.1 | +2.5 |
| Majority | | 642 | 20.1 | −9.0 |
| Turnout | | 3,197 | 31.0 | +4.2 |
| Labour hold | | Swing | -13.1 | |

==== June 2001 (by-election) ====
By-election: 10 June 2001
| Party | Candidate | Votes | % | ±% |
|---|---|---|---|---|
| Labour | Anthony Dale | 3,266 | 62.4 | +6.1 |
| Liberal Democrats | John Grant | 1,221 | 23.3 | +13.4 |
| Conservative | John Kershaw | 744 | 14.2 | −13.0 |
| Majority | | 2,045 | 39.1 | +10.0 |
| Turnout | | 5,231 | | |
| Labour hold | | Swing | -3.6 | |

==== May 2000 ====
2000
| Party | Candidate | Votes | % | ±% |
|---|---|---|---|---|
| Labour | Kathleen Fry* | 1,482 | 56.3 | +5.9 |
| Conservative | John Kershaw | 716 | 27.2 | +5.5 |
| Liberal Democrats | Howard Toity | 261 | 9.9 | −13.1 |
| Green | Mary Candeland | 175 | 6.6 | +6.6 |
| Majority | | 766 | 29.1 | +1.7 |
| Turnout | | 2,634 | 26.8 | −2.1 |
| Labour hold | | Swing | +0.2 | |

=== Elections in 1990s ===
==== May 1999 ====
1999
| Party | Candidate | Votes | % | ±% |
|---|---|---|---|---|
| Labour | Paul Cruthers | 1,456 | 50.4 | −1.0 |
| Liberal Democrats | Sadek Hamid | 664 | 23.0 | +5.9 |
| Conservative | John Kershaw | 626 | 21.7 | +0.4 |
| Socialist Labour | Steven Wynn | 142 | 4.9 | −0.2 |
| Majority | | 792 | 27.4 | −2.7 |
| Turnout | | 2,888 | 28.9 | |
| Labour hold | | Swing | -3.4 | |

==== May 1998 ====
1998
| Party | Candidate | Votes | % | ±% |
|---|---|---|---|---|
| Labour | Bernard Stone* | 1,247 | 51.4 | −8.8 |
| Conservative | John Kershaw | 516 | 21.3 | −1.2 |
| Liberal Democrats | Richard Powell | 414 | 17.1 | +5.5 |
| Green | Mary Candeland | 125 | 5.2 | −0.4 |
| Socialist Labour | Steven Wynn | 124 | 5.1 | +5.1 |
| Majority | | 731 | 30.1 | −34.5 |
| Turnout | | 2,426 | | |
| Labour hold | | Swing | -3.8 | |

==== May 1996 ====
1996
| Party | Candidate | Votes | % | ±% |
|---|---|---|---|---|
| Labour | Kath Fry* | 1,755 | 60.2 | +4.5 |
| Conservative | Richard West | 657 | 22.5 | −5.8 |
| Liberal Democrats | John Leech | 338 | 11.6 | +0.1 |
| Green | Mary Candeland | 164 | 5.6 | +1.1 |
| Majority | | 1,098 | 64.6 | +37.1 |
| Turnout | | 2,914 | | |
| Labour hold | | Swing | +5.1 | |

==== May 1995 ====
1995
| Party | Candidate | Votes | % | ±% |
|---|---|---|---|---|
| Labour | Dorothy Rathbone | 1,901 | 55.7 | −6.5 |
| Conservative | John Kershaw | 964 | 28.3 | +9.1 |
| Liberal Democrats | John Leech | 392 | 11.5 | −5.5 |
| Green | Bruce Bingham | 154 | 4.5 | +4.5 |
| Majority | | 937 | 27.5 | −15.5 |
| Turnout | | 3,411 | | |
| Labour hold | | Swing | -7.8 | |

==== May 1994 ====
1994
| Party | Candidate | Votes | % | ±% |
|---|---|---|---|---|
| Labour | B. Stone | 2,248 | 62.2 | +12.5 |
| Conservative | R. Ignatowicz | 694 | 19.2 | −21.8 |
| Liberal Democrats | J. Leech | 615 | 17.0 | +10.7 |
| Independent | R. Harper | 59 | 1.6 | +1.6 |
| Majority | | 1,554 | 43.0 | +34.3 |
| Turnout | | 3,616 | | |
| Labour hold | | Swing | +17.1 | |

==== May 1992 ====
1992
| Party | Candidate | Votes | % | ±% |
|---|---|---|---|---|
| Labour | K. Fry* | 1,763 | 49.7 | +0.5 |
| Conservative | J. Kershaw | 1,454 | 41.0 | −0.3 |
| Liberal Democrats | R. West | 224 | 6.3 | −3.2 |
| Green | C. Collis | 109 | 3.1 | +3.1 |
| Majority | | 309 | 8.7 | +0.9 |
| Turnout | | 3,550 | | |
| Labour hold | | Swing | +0.4 | |

==== May 1991 ====
1991
| Party | Candidate | Votes | % | ±% |
|---|---|---|---|---|
| Labour | H. Johnson | 2,058 | 49.2 | −4.9 |
| Conservative | J. Kershaw* | 1,731 | 41.3 | +9.1 |
| Liberal Democrats | S. C. Ashley | 398 | 9.5 | +3.2 |
| Majority | | 327 | 7.8 | −14.1 |
| Turnout | | 4,187 | 45.2 | |
| Labour gain from Conservative | | Swing | -7.0 | |

==== May 1990 ====
1990
| Party | Candidate | Votes | % | ±% |
|---|---|---|---|---|
| Labour | J. C. Morris* | 2,430 | 54.1 | +6.8 |
| Conservative | L. Houston | 1,445 | 32.2 | −8.1 |
| Green | C. I. Kirby | 334 | 7.4 | +3.7 |
| Liberal Democrats | B. Jones | 282 | 6.3 | +0.7 |
| Majority | | 985 | 21.9 | +14.9 |
| Turnout | | 4,491 | | |
| Labour hold | | Swing | +7.4 | |

=== Elections in 1980s ===
==== May 1988 ====
1988
| Party | Candidate | Votes | % | ±% |
|---|---|---|---|---|
| Labour | K. M. Fry | 2,285 | 47.3 | +8.7 |
| Conservative | V. M. Colledge | 1,948 | 40.3 | −2.4 |
| SLD | P. J. Davis | 270 | 5.6 | −10.3 |
| Green | C. I. Kirby | 179 | 3.7 | +0.9 |
| SDP | K. McKeon | 151 | 3.1 | +3.1 |
| Majority | | 337 | 7.0 | +2.9 |
| Turnout | | 4,833 | | |
| Labour gain from Conservative | | Swing | +5.5 | |

==== May 1987 ====
1987
| Party | Candidate | Votes | % | ±% |
|---|---|---|---|---|
| Conservative | John Kershaw | 2,294 | 42.7 | +9.1 |
| Labour | Yousouf Gooljary | 2,075 | 38.6 | −11.1 |
| SDP | Kenneth McKeon | 856 | 15.9 | −0.8 |
| Green | Colin Kirby | 149 | 2.8 | +2.8 |
| Majority | | 219 | 4.1 | −12.0 |
| Turnout | | 5,374 | | |
| Conservative hold | | Swing | +10.1 | |

==== May 1986 ====
1986
| Party | Candidate | Votes | % | ±% |
|---|---|---|---|---|
| Labour | J. Morris | 2,310 | 49.7 | +7.9 |
| Conservative | L. Whetton | 1,563 | 33.6 | −8.8 |
| SDP | K. McKeon | 779 | 16.7 | +0.9 |
| Majority | | 747 | 16.1 | +15.4 |
| Turnout | | 4,652 | | |
| Labour gain from Conservative | | Swing | +8.3 | |

==== May 1984 ====
1984
| Party | Candidate | Votes | % | ±% |
|---|---|---|---|---|
| Conservative | Catherine McQuade | 1,870 | 42.4 | −3.5 |
| Labour | Roy Walters | 1,840 | 41.8 | +3.8 |
| SDP | Muriel James | 696 | 15.8 | −0.3 |
| Majority | | 30 | 0.7 | −7.3 |
| Turnout | | 4,406 | | |
| Conservative hold | | Swing | -3.6 | |

==== May 1983 ====
1983
| Party | Candidate | Votes | % | ±% |
|---|---|---|---|---|
| Conservative | Michael Whetton* | 2,063 | 45.9 | +1.5 |
| Labour | Roy Walters | 1,705 | 38.0 | +7.9 |
| SDP | Mary James | 723 | 16.1 | −9.5 |
| Majority | | 358 | 8.0 | −6.4 |
| Turnout | | 4,491 | | |
| Conservative hold | | Swing | -3.2 | |

==== September 1982 (by-election) ====
By-election: 16 September 1982
| Party | Candidate | Votes | % | ±% |
|---|---|---|---|---|
| Conservative | Lynia Meadowcroft | 1,463 | 45.9 | +3.0 |
| Labour | Rhona Graham | 1,048 | 32.9 | +3.9 |
| SDP | Mary Jones | 673 | 21.2 | −3.5 |
| Majority | | 415 | 13.0 | +1.3 |
| Turnout | | 3,184 | 48.7 | |
| Conservative hold | | Swing | | |

==== May 1982 ====
1982 (3 vacancies)
| Party | Candidate | Votes | % | ±% |
|---|---|---|---|---|
| Conservative | Robert Rodgers* | 2,029 | 42.9 | |
| Conservative | Andrew Neville | 1,951 | 41.3 | |
| Conservative | Michael Whetton | 1,926 | 40.7 | |
| Labour | David Grigg | 1,371 | 29.0 | |
| Labour | Anthony Williams | 1,300 | 27.5 | |
| Labour | Barclay Patoir | 1,220 | 25.8 | |
| SDP | Roy Jarman | 1,168 | 24.7 | |
| SDP | David Levy | 1,057 | 22.4 | |
| SDP | Simon Lewis | 1,057 | 22.4 | |
| Majority | | 555 | 11.7 | |
| Turnout | | 4,729 | 48.7 | |
| Conservative win (new seat) | | | | |
| Conservative win (new seat) | | | | |
| Conservative win (new seat) | | | | |

== See also ==
- Manchester City Council
- Manchester City Council elections
