= 2008 Manchester City Council election =

2008 UK local government election

- 1 May 2008

32 of 96 seats to Manchester City Council 49 seats needed for a majority
	First party	Second party	Third party
Leader	Richard Leese	Simon Ashley	Faraz Bhatti
Party	Labour	Liberal Democrats	Conservative
Leader's seat	Crumpsall	Gorton South	Whalley Range
Last election	19 seats, 45.4%	13 seats, 31.8%	0 seats, 11.0%
Seats before	62	32	1
Seats won	19	13	0
Seats after	62	33	1
Seat change	Steady	▲1	Steady
Popular vote	39,300	27,773	12,999
Percentage	43.0%	30.4%	14.2%
Swing	▼2.4%	▼1.4%	▲3.2%
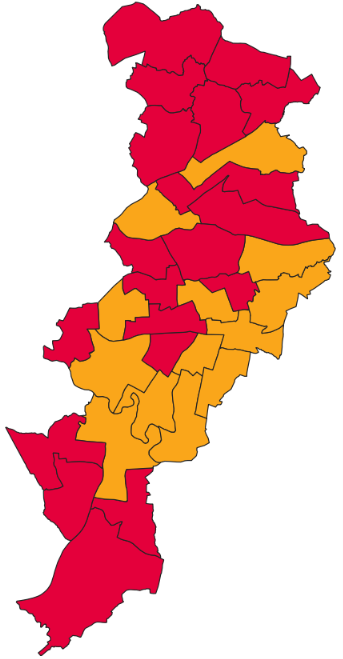
- Map of results of 2008 election
Leader of the Council before election
Richard Leese
Labour
Leader of the Council after election
Richard Leese
Labour

Elections to Manchester City Council took place on 1 May 2008. One third of the council was up for election - every ward of the city returned one councillor at this election out of the three councillors a ward in the city has.

Four national political parties - the Conservative Party, Labour, Liberal Democrats and the Green Party - each stood a candidate in every ward in this election. There were candidates from other political parties standing in some of the wards, but there were no independent candidates standing for election this year in the city.

The Labour Party retained overall control of the council. The Green Party lost their only seat in Hulme to Labour, and the Conservatives failed to gain their first elected councillor, though became the third party on the council due to having one councillor through an earlier defection. The Liberal Democrats, who had suffered two defections since the last election - firstly the aforementioned Tory defection, and another to Labour - gained two councillors (in Miles Platting & Newton Heath and Northenden) but lost one (in Longsight) to Labour.

Voting took place between 7am and 10pm on Thursday 1 May 2008 and counting took place that night at the Town Hall. Overall turnout fell slightly to 27%.

== Election result ==
Party	Votes		Seats			Full Council	
Labour Party	39,300 (43.0%)	▼2.4	19 (59.4%)	19 / 32	Steady	62 (64.6%)	62 / 96
Liberal Democrats	27,773 (30.4%)	▼1.4	13 (40.6%)	13 / 32	▲1	33 (34.4%)	33 / 96
Conservative Party	12,999 (14.2%)	▲3.2	0 (0.0%)	0 / 32	Steady	1 (1.0%)	1 / 96
Green Party	7,602 (8.3%)	▼0.1	0 (0.0%)	0 / 32	▼1	0 (0.0%)	0 / 96
BNP	1,765 (1.9%)	▲0.8	0 (0.0%)	0 / 32	Steady	0 (0.0%)	0 / 96
Respect	655 (0.6%)	Steady	0 (0.0%)	0 / 32	Steady	0 (0.0%)	0 / 96
Left List	612 (0.6%)	N/A	0 (0.0%)	0 / 32	N/A	0 (0.0%)	0 / 96
UKIP	371 (0.4%)	▼0.7	0 (0.0%)	0 / 32	Steady	0 (0.0%)	0 / 96
Socialist	295 (0.3%)	Steady	0 (0.0%)	0 / 32	Steady	0 (0.0%)	0 / 96

↓
62	33	1

== Ward results ==
=== Ancoats and Clayton ===
Ancoats and Clayton
Party	Candidate	Votes	%	±%
Labour	Mike Carmody*	1,428	59.7	−4.9
Liberal Democrats	Carol Connell	403	16.9	−3.2
Conservative	David Morgan	334	14.0	+8.3
Green	Sophy Hansford	226	9.5	+3.2
Majority		1,025	42.9	−1.6
Turnout		2,391	23.4	−1.0
Labour hold		Swing	-0.8	

=== Ardwick ===
Ardwick
Party	Candidate	Votes	%	±%
Labour	Tom O'Callaghan*	1,180	62.1	+4.7
Liberal Democrats	Mohammed Sajjad	346	18.2	−6.6
Conservative	Claire Babington	221	11.6	+4.3
Green	Andrew Speke	152	8.0	−2.6
Majority		836	44.0	+11.4
Turnout		1,899	17.9	−3.6
Labour hold		Swing	+5.6	

=== Baguley ===
Baguley
Party	Candidate	Votes	%	±%
Labour Co-op	Tony Burns*	1,123	46.7	−5.9
Conservative	Nathan Cruddas	565	23.5	+3.5
Socialist	Lynn Worthington	295	12.3	+1.9
Liberal Democrats	Ann Rodgers	243	10.1	+0.4
Green	Lynne Richmond	179	7.4	+0.1
Majority		558	23.2	−9.5
Turnout		2,405	22.9	−0.1
Labour hold		Swing	-4.7	

=== Bradford ===
Bradford
Party	Candidate	Votes	%	±%
Labour	Neil Swannick*	1,467	67.1	−3.7
Liberal Democrats	Chris Jenkinson	286	13.1	−0.7
Conservative	Rod Keller	224	10.2	+1.1
Green	Andrew Bullen	209	9.6	+3.3
Majority		1,181	54.0	−3.0
Turnout		2,186	22.0	−0.3
Labour hold		Swing	-1.5	

=== Brooklands ===
Brooklands
Party	Candidate	Votes	%	±%
Labour	Glynn Evans*	1,274	44.2	−6.1
Conservative	Marie Raynor	1,106	38.4	+5.4
Liberal Democrats	Gary Bridges	362	12.6	+0.8
Green	Tamisin MacCarthy-Morrogh	146	5.1	+0.3
Majority		168	5.8	−11.5
Turnout		2,882	28.6	−0.5
Labour hold		Swing	-5.7	

=== Burnage ===
Burnage
Party	Candidate	Votes	%	±%
Liberal Democrats	John Cameron*	2,096	64.8	+10.5
Labour	Tom Murphy	768	23.7	−12.3
Conservative	Peter Schofield	228	7.1	+1.3
Green	Angela Tibke	142	4.4	+0.5
Majority		1,328	41.1	+22.8
Turnout		3,234	31.0	−1.0
Liberal Democrats hold		Swing	+11.4	

=== Charlestown ===
Charlestown
Party	Candidate	Votes	%	±%
Labour	Mark Hackett*	1,328	46.0	−13.0
BNP	Stephen Moran	687	23.8	+23.8
Conservative	Gareth Brown	425	14.7	−1.3
Green	Michael Prior	186	6.4	+0.7
Liberal Democrats	Alexandra Reynolds-Cocroft	178	6.2	−4.1
UKIP	Catherine Ritchie	84	2.9	−6.2
Majority		641	22.2	−20.7
Turnout		2,888	29.8	+2.0
Labour hold		Swing	-18.4	

=== Cheetham ===
Cheetham
Party	Candidate	Votes	%	±%
Labour	Martin Pagel*	1,735	49.9	−14.7
Conservative	Wajid Ali	673	19.3	+8.8
Respect	Kay Phillips	502	14.4	+14.4
Liberal Democrats	Sham Raja	429	12.3	−3.5
Green	Luke Smith	141	4.1	−5.1
Majority		1,062	30.5	−18.3
Turnout		3,480	29.2	−2.3
Labour hold		Swing	-11.7	

=== Chorlton ===
Chorlton
Party	Candidate	Votes	%	±%
Labour	Sheila Newman*	2,126	45.2	+4.8
Liberal Democrats	Lianne Williams	1,867	39.7	−1.6
Green	Brian Candeland	448	9.5	−2.8
Conservative	David Hopps	260	5.5	−0.5
Majority		259	5.5	+4.5
Turnout		4,701	46.0	+2.7
Labour hold		Swing	+3.2	

=== Chorlton Park ===
Chorlton Park
Party	Candidate	Votes	%	±%
Liberal Democrats	Bernie Ryan	1,693	53.4	−2.0
Labour Co-op	John Hacking	763	24.0	+0.6
Green	Kathryn Brownbridge	359	11.3	−1.2
Conservative	Christopher Green	358	11.3	+2.5
Majority		930	29.3	−2.7
Turnout		3,173	30.5	−0.5
Liberal Democrats hold		Swing	-1.3	

=== City Centre ===
City Centre
Party	Candidate	Votes	%	±%
Liberal Democrats	Marc Ramsbottom*	568	36.1	+3.3
Labour	Anthony McCaul	479	30.5	+4.7
Conservative	Rob Adlard	386	24.6	+2.0
Green	Peter Birkinshaw	139	8.8	−2.5
Majority		89	5.7	−1.4
Turnout		1,572	15.0	−1.0
Liberal Democrats hold		Swing	-0.7	

=== Crumpsall ===
Crumpsall
Party	Candidate	Votes	%	±%
Labour	Richard Leese*	1,773	56.5	−3.6
Conservative	Kim Glasspole	597	19.0	+0.5
Liberal Democrats	Rashid Shahbaz	354	11.3	−1.8
Green	Eithne Quinn	208	6.6	−1.7
UKIP	Bob Willescroft	206	6.6	+6.6
Majority		1,176	37.5	−4.1
Turnout		3,138	30.0	+0.1
Labour hold		Swing	-2.0	

=== Didsbury East ===
Didsbury East
Party	Candidate	Votes	%	±%
Liberal Democrats	David Sandiford*	2,050	52.5	+6.6
Labour	Andrew Simcock	1,053	27.0	−5.2
Conservative	Louise Quigley	492	12.6	−0.4
Green	Gerry Gee	310	7.9	−1.0
Majority		997	25.5	+11.8
Turnout		3,905	38.0	−1.1
Liberal Democrats hold		Swing	+5.9	

=== Didsbury West ===
Didsbury West
Party	Candidate	Votes	%	±%
Liberal Democrats	Graham Shaw*	1,283	47.2	+1.5
Labour	Jenny Lennox	620	22.8	−1.7
Conservative	David Bean	451	16.6	+2.3
Green	James Alden	281	10.3	−3.1
UKIP	Robert Gutfreund-Walmsley	81	3.0	+0.9
Majority		663	24.4	+3.2
Turnout		2,716	27.8	−1.4
Liberal Democrats hold		Swing	+1.6	

=== Fallowfield ===
Fallowfield
Party	Candidate	Votes	%	±%
Labour	David Royle*	1,178	51.4	−4.5
Liberal Democrats	Kas Afzal	643	28.1	+6.1
Conservative	Colin Power	263	11.5	+0.9
Green	Daniel Lee	207	9.0	−2.6
Majority		535	23.4	−10.5
Turnout		2,291	22.8	+2.8
Labour hold		Swing	-5.3	

=== Gorton North ===
Gorton North
Party	Candidate	Votes	%	±%
Liberal Democrats	Jackie Pearcey*	1,468	48.7	−3.6
Labour	John Hughes	1,156	38.3	−2.4
Conservative	Jane Percival	242	8.0	+4.2
Green	Karl Wardlaw	150	5.0	+1.8
Majority		312	10.3	−1.3
Turnout		3,016	27.5	−4.1
Liberal Democrats hold		Swing	-0.6	

=== Gorton South ===
Gorton South
Party	Candidate	Votes	%	±%
Liberal Democrats	Charles Glover*	1,262	42.8	−9.3
Labour	Julie Reid	1,017	34.5	−3.0
Left List	Sue McPherson	292	9.9	+9.9
Conservative	William Clapham	217	7.4	+3.2
Green	Deborah Clarke	164	5.6	+1.2
Majority		245	8.3	+3.9
Turnout		2,952	25.2	−1.7
Liberal Democrats hold		Swing	-3.1	

=== Harpurhey ===
Harpurhey
Party	Candidate	Votes	%	±%
Labour	Patrick Karney*	1,475	57.3	−1.6
Conservative	Will Palmer	500	19.4	+7.8
Liberal Democrats	Dave Page	317	12.3	−1.7
Green	Katherine Smith	283	11.0	+5.8
Majority		975	37.9	−7.0
Turnout		2,575	21.1	+0.3
Labour hold		Swing	-4.7	

=== Higher Blackley ===
Higher Blackley
Party	Candidate	Votes	%	±%
Labour	Ken Barnes*	1,328	43.8	−4.6
BNP	Derek Adams	828	27.3	+3.4
Conservative	Vivienne Clarke	467	15.4	+3.0
Liberal Democrats	Lee Walker	248	8.2	−0.8
Green	Michael Daw	164	5.4	+1.8
Majority		500	16.5	−8.0
Turnout		3,035	30.3	+0.6
Labour hold		Swing	-4.0	

=== Hulme ===
Hulme
Party	Candidate	Votes	%	±%
Labour	Emily Lomax	961	42.2	−7.9
Green	Steven Durrant	911	40.0	+7.4
Conservative	Jamie Hutchinson	215	9.4	+3.1
Liberal Democrats	Glenn Hinks	190	8.3	−2.7
Majority		50	2.2	−15.3
Turnout		2,277	21.7	+0.8
Labour gain from Green		Swing	-7.6	

=== Levenshulme ===
Levenshulme
Party	Candidate	Votes	%	±%
Liberal Democrats	Keith Whitmore*	1,530	55.7	+4.5
Labour	Quammer Ahmad	715	26.0	−1.4
Green	Justine Hall	327	11.9	−0.4
Conservative	Abbas Khurshid	175	6.4	−2.7
Majority		815	29.7	+5.9
Turnout		2,747	26.7	−0.3
Liberal Democrats hold		Swing	+2.9	

=== Longsight ===
Longsight
Party	Candidate	Votes	%	±%
Labour	Luthfur Rahman	2,005	61.6	+14.1
Liberal Democrats	Liaqat Ali*	858	26.4	−21.1
Green	Spencer Fitzgibbon	237	7.3	−2.8
Conservative	Daniel Valentine	153	4.7	−0.3
Majority		1,147	35.3	+25.3
Turnout		3,253	31.4	+0.0
Labour gain from Liberal Democrats		Swing	+17.6	

=== Miles Platting and Newton Heath ===
Miles Platting and Newton Heath
Party	Candidate	Votes	%	±%
Liberal Democrats	Damien O'Connor	1,441	45.6	+5.0
Labour	Christine Carroll*	1,256	39.5	−3.1
BNP	Joseph Cegla	250	7.9	−0.3
Conservative	Vaseem Valentine	147	4.6	+0.6
Green	Jonathan Mercer	83	2.6	+0.2
Majority		185	5.8	+3.8
Turnout		3,177	31.0	+0.4
Liberal Democrats gain from Labour		Swing	+4.0	

=== Moss Side ===
Moss Side
Party	Candidate	Votes	%	±%
Labour	William Alistair Cox*	1,776	68.0	+0.8
Liberal Democrats	Zeke Ukairo	271	10.5	−5.1
Green	Nigel Woodcock	225	8.6	−0.4
Conservative	Kashif Ali	185	7.1	−1.2
Respect	Ali Shelmani	153	5.9	+5.9
Majority		1,505	57.7	+6.0
Turnout		2,610	24.6	+0.2
Labour hold		Swing	-2.9	

=== Moston ===
Moston
Party	Candidate	Votes	%	±%
Labour	Paul Murphy*	1,551	49.5	−6.0
Conservative	Gareth Morris	936	29.9	+9.8
Liberal Democrats	Timothy Hartley	398	12.7	+2.8
Green	Tom Redford	246	7.9	+3.7
Majority		615	19.6	−15.8
Turnout		3,131	28.6	−0.6
Labour hold		Swing	-7.9	

=== Northenden ===
Northenden
Party	Candidate	Votes	%	±%
Liberal Democrats	Martin Eakins	1,562	43.8	+2.5
Labour	Michael Kane*	1,554	43.6	−1.0
Conservative	Sarah Lovell	293	8.2	−0.3
Green	Lance Crookes	159	4.5	−1.1
Majority		8	0.2	−3.0
Turnout		3,568	33.7	+2.4
Liberal Democrats gain from Labour		Swing	+1.7	

=== Old Moat ===
Old Moat
Party	Candidate	Votes	%	±%
Labour	Andrew Fender*	1,391	50.5	−3.2
Liberal Democrats	Sufiyan Rana	947	34.4	+5.3
Green	Lia Sims	213	7.7	−1.2
Conservative	Paul Lally	205	7.4	−1.0
Majority		444	16.1	−8.5
Turnout		2,756	26.8	+1.3
Labour hold		Swing	-4.2	

=== Rusholme ===
Rusholme
Party	Candidate	Votes	%	±%
Liberal Democrats	Paul Shannon*	1,090	42.7	+0.4
Labour	Atiha Chaudry	693	27.2	+1.8
Left List	Nahella Ashraf	320	12.5	−5.7
Conservative	Dola Miah	291	11.4	+4.9
Green	Penny Collins	158	6.2	−1.4
Majority		397	15.6	−1.3
Turnout		2,552	25.7	−5.0
Liberal Democrats hold		Swing	-0.7	

=== Sharston ===
Sharston
Party	Candidate	Votes	%	±%
Labour Co-op	Tommy Judge*	1,115	47.2	−5.3
Conservative	Jimmy McCullough	773	32.7	+7.2
Liberal Democrats	Bill Fisher	274	11.6	−0.7
Green	Karen Duffy	199	8.4	−1.3
Majority		324	13.7	−13.3
Turnout		2,361	21.1	−0.7
Labour hold		Swing	-6.2	

=== Whalley Range ===
Whalley Range
Party	Candidate	Votes	%	±%
Liberal Democrats	John Grant*	1,683	39.3	−10.9
Labour	Amina Lone	1,271	29.7	−5.3
Conservative	Fawad Hussain	945	22.1	+17.0
Green	Mary Candeland	381	8.9	−0.8
Majority		412	9.6	−5.5
Turnout		4,280	40.5	+1.5
Liberal Democrats hold		Swing	-8.1	

=== Withington ===
Withington
Party	Candidate	Votes	%	±%
Liberal Democrats	Brendon Jones	1,267	57.7	−3.0
Labour	Leif Jerram	508	23.1	+0.6
Green	Felicity Paris	223	10.2	+0.5
Conservative	Zoe Slater	199	9.1	+2.0
Majority		759	34.5	−3.7
Turnout		2,197	20.6	−0.9
Liberal Democrats hold		Swing	-1.8	

=== Woodhouse Park ===
Woodhouse Park
Party	Candidate	Votes	%	±%
Labour	Brian O'Neil*	1,227	60.6	−4.7
Conservative	Stephen Heath	473	23.4	+5.2
Liberal Democrats	Joe Podbylski	166	8.2	−0.6
Green	Jody Bradford	159	7.9	+0.1
Majority		754	37.4	−9.6
Turnout		2,018	20.8	−0.4
Labour hold		Swing	-4.9	

== By-elections between 2008 and 2010 ==
Didsbury West By-Election 29 January 2009
Party	Candidate	Votes	%	±%
Liberal Democrats	Lianne Caroline Williams	1,439	55.6	+8.4
Labour	David Clive Ellison	638	24.7	+1.9
Conservative	David Michael Bean	336	13.0	−3.6
Green	Geoff Evans	173	6.7	−3.6
Majority		801	31.0	+6.6
Turnout		2,586	26.1	−1.7
Liberal Democrats hold		Swing	+3.2	

Moston By-Election 9 April 2009
Party	Candidate	Votes	%	±%
Labour	Rita Anne Tavernor	1,353	38.7	−10.8
BNP	Derek George Adams	815	23.3	+23.3
Liberal Democrats	Timothy John Hartley	696	19.9	+7.2
Conservative	Phil Donohue	558	16.0	−13.9
Green	Karl Wardlaw	74	2.1	−5.8
Majority		538	15.4	−4.2
Turnout		2,586	26.1	−1.7
Labour hold		Swing	-17.0	
