= 2007 Manchester City Council election =

2007 UK local government election

- 3 May 2007

32 of 96 seats to Manchester City Council 49 seats needed for a majority
	First party	Second party	Third party
Leader	Richard Leese	Simon Ashley	Vanessa Hall
Party	Labour	Liberal Democrats	Green
Leader's seat	Crumpsall	Gorton South	Hulme
Last election	23 seats, 44.8%	9 seats, 31.6%	0 seats, 9.3%
Seats before	62	33	1
Seats won	19	13	0
Seats after	61	34	1
Seat change	▼1	▲1	Steady
Popular vote	41,213	28,898	7,623
Percentage	45.4%	31.8%	8.4%
Swing	▲0.6%	▲0.2%	▼0.9%
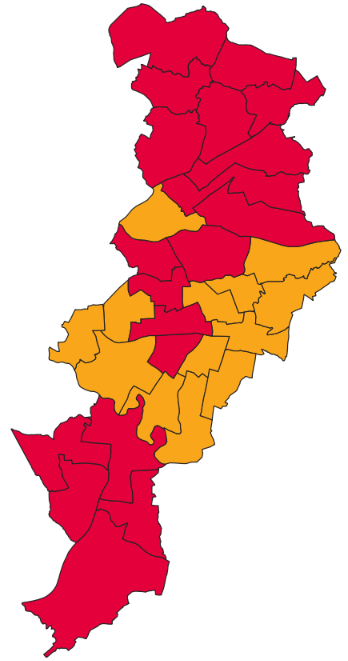
- Map of results of 2007 election
Leader of the Council before election
Richard Leese
Labour
Leader of the Council after election
Richard Leese
Labour

Elections to Manchester City Council took place on 3 May 2007. One third of the council was up for election, with each successful candidate to serve a four-year term of office, expiring in 2011. The council stayed under Labour Party control, on a reduced turnout of 28.3%.

== Election result ==
Party	Votes		Seats			Full Council	
Labour Party	41,213 (45.4%)	▲0.6	19 (59.4%)	19 / 32	▼1	61 (63.5%)	61 / 96
Liberal Democrats	28,898 (31.8%)	▲0.2	13 (40.6%)	13 / 32	▲1	34 (35.4%)	34 / 96
Green Party	7,623 (8.4%)	▼0.9	0 (0.0%)	0 / 32	Steady	1 (1.0%)	1 / 96
Conservative Party	9,975 (11.0%)	▲0.5	0 (0.0%)	0 / 32	Steady	0 (0.0%)	0 / 96
UKIP	1,041 (1.1%)	▼0.1	0 (0.0%)	0 / 32	Steady	0 (0.0%)	0 / 96
BNP	972 (1.1%)	▲0.4	0 (0.0%)	0 / 32	Steady	0 (0.0%)	0 / 96
Respect	535 (0.6%)	▼0.1	0 (0.0%)	0 / 32	Steady	0 (0.0%)	0 / 96
Socialist	251 (0.3%)	▲0.1	0 (0.0%)	0 / 32	Steady	0 (0.0%)	0 / 96
Independent	190 (0.2%)	▼0.7	0 (0.0%)	0 / 32	Steady	0 (0.0%)	0 / 96
United Socialist	56 (0.1%)	N/A	0 (0.0%)	0 / 32	N/A	0 (0.0%)	0 / 96

↓
1	61	34

== Ward results ==
=== Ancoats and Clayton ===
Ancoats and Clayton
Party	Candidate	Votes	%	±%
Labour	Mick Loughman*	1,518	64.6	+16.3
Liberal Democrats	Daniel Valentine	473	20.1	−20.6
Green	Victoria Album	148	6.3	+2.1
Conservative	David Hopps	135	5.7	+1.2
Independent	John Hulse	76	3.2	+0.9
Majority		1,045	44.5	+37.0
Turnout		2,350	24.4	−8.5
Labour hold		Swing	+18.4	

=== Ardwick ===
Ardwick
Party	Candidate	Votes	%	±%
Labour	Bernard Priest*	1,219	57.4	−4.0
Liberal Democrats	Jawaid Chaudhry	526	24.8	+4.9
Green	Justine Hall	224	10.6	0
Conservative	Kashif Ali	155	7.3	−0.7
Majority		693	32.6	−8.8
Turnout		2,124	21.5	−0.2
Labour hold		Swing	-4.4	

=== Baguley ===
Baguley
Party	Candidate	Votes	%	±%
Labour Co-op	Paul Andrews*	1,268	52.6	+3.6
Conservative	John Leaning	481	20.0	−0.2
Socialist	Lynn Worthington	251	10.4	+1.7
Liberal Democrats	William Fisher	233	9.7	−3.4
Green	Karen Duffy	176	7.3	−1.6
Majority		787	32.7	+4.0
Turnout		2,409	23.0	−0.9
Labour hold		Swing	+1.9	

=== Bradford ===
Bradford
Party	Candidate	Votes	%	±%
Labour	Rosa Battle	1,476	70.8	+1.0
Liberal Democrats	James Guise	288	13.8	−0.7
Conservative	Rodney Keller	190	9.1	+0.5
Green	Christopher Waldon	131	6.3	−0.8
Majority		1,188	57.0	+1.7
Turnout		2,085	22.3	−3.0
Labour hold		Swing	+0.8	

=== Brooklands ===
Brooklands
Party	Candidate	Votes	%	±%
Labour	Sue Cooley*	1,460	50.3	+8.2
Conservative	Marie Raynor	958	33.0	+3.8
Liberal Democrats	David Kierman	342	11.8	−12.3
Green	Tamisin MacCarthy-Morrogh	140	4.8	+0.2
Majority		502	17.3	+4.3
Turnout		2,900	29.1	−4.3
Labour hold		Swing	+2.2	

=== Burnage ===
Burnage
Party	Candidate	Votes	%	±%
Liberal Democrats	Iain Donaldson*	1,825	54.3	+6.8
Labour	Frank Duffy	1,209	36.0	−2.0
Conservative	Peter Schofield	194	5.8	−2.4
Green	Joseph Gair	132	3.9	−0.9
Majority		616	18.3	+8.8
Turnout		3,360	32.0	+2.2
Liberal Democrats hold		Swing	+4.4	

=== Charlestown ===
Charlestown
Party	Candidate	Votes	%	±%
Labour	Basil Curley*	1,542	59.0	+4.7
Conservative	Kim Glasspole	419	16.0	+1.3
Liberal Democrats	Ann Rodgers	268	10.3	−2.9
UKIP	Andrea Ritchie	238	9.1	−2.7
Green	Helen Dolan	148	5.7	−0.3
Majority		1,123	42.9	+3.3
Turnout		2,615	27.8	−1.4
Labour hold		Swing	+1.7	

=== Cheetham ===
Cheetham
Party	Candidate	Votes	%	±%
Labour	Mohammed Khan*	2,340	64.6	+19.0
Liberal Democrats	Sham Raja	571	15.8	−27.2
Conservative	Wajid Ali	380	10.5	+5.4
Green	Jackie Smith	332	9.2	+2.9
Majority		1,769	48.8	+46.2
Turnout		3,623	31.5	−4.7
Labour hold		Swing	+23.1	

=== Chorlton ===
Chorlton
Party	Candidate	Votes	%	±%
Liberal Democrats	Paul Ankers	1,823	41.3	+1.9
Labour	Angela Gallagher*	1,781	40.4	−1.6
Green	Brian Candeland	544	12.3	−1.7
Conservative	Claire McLauchlin	264	6.0	+1.4
Majority		42	1.0	−1.6
Turnout		4,412	43.3	+0.3
Liberal Democrats gain from Labour		Swing	+1.7	

=== Chorlton Park ===
Chorlton Park
Party	Candidate	Votes	%	±%
Liberal Democrats	Tony Bethell*	1,751	55.4	+0.7
Labour Co-op	John Hacking	739	23.4	−1.9
Green	Kathryn Brownbridge	394	12.5	−0.2
Conservative	Robert Chilton	279	8.8	+1.5
Majority		1,012	32.0	+2.6
Turnout		3,163	31.0	−1.1
Liberal Democrats hold		Swing	+1.3	

=== City Centre ===
City Centre
Party	Candidate	Votes	%	±%
Liberal Democrats	Kenneth Dobson*	498	32.8	−5.2
Labour	Kathy Crotty	391	25.8	−1.0
Conservative	Rob Adlard	343	22.6	+0.3
Green	Birgit Vollm	171	11.3	−1.7
Independent	Kin Cheng	114	7.5	+7.5
Majority		107	7.1	−4.1
Turnout		1,517	16.0	−0.4
Liberal Democrats hold		Swing	-2.1	

=== Crumpsall ===
Crumpsall
Party	Candidate	Votes	%	±%
Labour	Con Keegan*	1,832	60.1	+10.5
Conservative	Adrian Glasspole	564	18.5	+4.3
Liberal Democrats	Muhammad Shahbaz	398	13.1	−8.8
Green	John Cummings	254	8.3	+1.7
Majority		1,268	41.6	+14.0
Turnout		3,048	29.9	−3.9
Labour hold		Swing	+3.1	

=== Didsbury East ===
Didsbury East
Party	Candidate	Votes	%	±%
Liberal Democrats	Helen Fisher*	1,856	45.9	+0.6
Labour	Geoff Bridson	1,301	32.2	−2.1
Conservative	David Fairclough	526	13.0	+4.0
Green	Gerry Gee	359	8.9	−2.6
Majority		555	13.7	+2.7
Turnout		4,042	39.1	0
Liberal Democrats hold		Swing	+1.3	

=== Didsbury West ===
Didsbury West
Party	Candidate	Votes	%	±%
Liberal Democrats	Neil Trafford*	1,328	45.7	+2.8
Labour	David Ellison	712	24.5	−0.5
Conservative	Peter Caddick	414	14.3	−3.2
Green	James Alden	389	13.4	+1.5
UKIP	Robert Gutfreund-Walmsley	61	2.1	−0.6
Majority		616	21.2	+3.3
Turnout		2,904	29.2	+1.2
Liberal Democrats hold		Swing	+1.6	

=== Fallowfield ===
Fallowfield
Party	Candidate	Votes	%	±%
Labour	Peter Morrison*	1,215	55.9	+9.5
Liberal Democrats	John-Paul Wilkins	478	22.0	−15.2
Green	Rachel Sills	251	11.6	+5.9
Conservative	Ashton Cull	230	10.6	+4.7
Majority		737	33.9	+24.6
Turnout		2,174	20.0	−8.1
Labour hold		Swing	+12.3	

=== Gorton North ===
Gorton North
Party	Candidate	Votes	%	±%
Liberal Democrats	Wendy Helsby*	1,753	52.3	+16.2
Labour	John Hughes	1,365	40.7	+1.0
Conservative	Joyce Kaye	126	3.8	−0.8
Green	Rachel Wilson	107	3.2	+0.7
Majority		388	11.6	+8.0
Turnout		3,351	31.6	+0.2
Liberal Democrats hold		Swing	+7.6	

=== Gorton South ===
Gorton South
Party	Candidate	Votes	%	±%
Liberal Democrats	Simon Ashley*	1,600	52.1	+4.3
Labour	Julie Reid	1,150	37.5	+1.7
Green	Barnaby Wolfram	134	4.4	−4.1
Conservative	Lawrie Clapham	130	4.2	−3.7
United Socialist	Sabrina Jones	56	1.8	+1.8
Majority		450	14.7	+2.7
Turnout		3,070	26.9	0
Liberal Democrats hold		Swing	+1.3	

=== Harpurhey ===
Harpurhey
Party	Candidate	Votes	%	±%
Labour	Joanne Green*	1,497	58.9	+3.6
Liberal Democrats	Robert Brettle	355	14.0	+1.5
Conservative	Harriet Holder	294	11.6	−0.2
UKIP	Roger P Bullock	264	10.4	−1.7
Green	Katherine Smith	133	5.2	−3.2
Majority		1,142	44.9	+2.1
Turnout		2,543	20.8	−1.3
Labour hold		Swing	+1.0	

=== Higher Blackley ===
Higher Blackley
Party	Candidate	Votes	%	±%
Labour	Harold Lyons*	1,449	48.4	−8.6
BNP	Joseph Finnon	716	23.9	+23.9
Conservative	Vivienne Clarke	372	12.4	−7.1
Liberal Democrats	Brian Newton	268	9.0	−5.8
Green	Michael Shaw	108	3.6	−5.1
UKIP	Shirley Reeve	82	2.7	+2.7
Majority		733	24.5	−13.0
Turnout		2,995	29.7	+3.2
Labour hold		Swing	-16.2	

=== Hulme ===
Hulme
Party	Candidate	Votes	%	±%
Labour	Mary Murphy*	969	50.1	+12.2
Green	Steven Durrant	630	32.6	+7.6
Liberal Democrats	Oliver West	213	11.0	−15.7
Conservative	Andrew Binns	122	6.3	+1.7
Majority		339	17.5	+6.4
Turnout		1,934	20.9	−3.2
Labour hold		Swing	+2.3	

=== Levenshulme ===
Levenshulme
Party	Candidate	Votes	%	±%
Liberal Democrats	John Commons*	1,388	51.2	+1.1
Labour	Dermot Zafar	742	27.4	−0.5
Green	Peter Thompson	334	12.3	−2.0
Conservative	Anne Carroll	248	9.1	+1.3
Majority		646	23.8	+1.5
Turnout		2,712	27.0	−1.4
Liberal Democrats hold		Swing	+0.8	

=== Longsight ===
Longsight
Party	Candidate	Votes	%	±%
Liberal Democrats	Abid Latif Chohan*	1,506	47.5	+22.4
Labour	Sajjid Hussain	1,188	37.5	−17.1
Green	Spencer Fitzgibbon	320	10.1	−4.3
Conservative	Jane L'Anson	157	5.0	−0.9
Majority		318	10.0	−20.0
Turnout		3,171	31.4	−0.9
Liberal Democrats hold		Swing	+19.7	

=== Miles Platting and Newton Heath ===
Miles Platting and Newton Heath
Party	Candidate	Votes	%	±%
Labour	June Hitchin*	1,331	42.6	−0.9
Liberal Democrats	Damien O'Connor	1,270	40.6	+13.8
BNP	Derek Adams	256	8.2	−8.7
Conservative	Heather Grant	124	4.0	−0.5
Green	Anthony Quinn	75	2.4	−0.8
UKIP	Lisa Duffy	69	2.2	−2.8
Majority		61	2.0	−14.7
Turnout		3,125	30.6	+1.5
Labour hold		Swing	-7.3	

=== Moss Side ===
Moss Side
Party	Candidate	Votes	%	±%
Labour	Sameem Ali	1,660	67.2	+3.5
Liberal Democrats	Zeke Ukairo	384	15.6	−3.1
Green	George Czernuszka	222	9.0	+0.4
Conservative	Peter Young	204	8.3	+4.0
Majority		1,276	51.7	+6.7
Turnout		2,470	24.4	−3.4
Labour hold		Swing	+3.3	

=== Moston ===
Moston
Party	Candidate	Votes	%	±%
Labour	Henry Cooper*	1,760	55.5	+2.4
Conservative	Tony Pinder	637	20.1	−2.5
UKIP	Peter Reeve	327	10.3	+10.3
Liberal Democrats	Timothy Hartley	314	9.9	−5.3
Green	Robin Goater	132	4.2	−4.8
Majority		1,123	35.4	+4.9
Turnout		3,170	29.2	−2.0
Labour hold		Swing	+2.4	

=== Northenden ===
Northenden
Party	Candidate	Votes	%	±%
Labour	Sandra Bracegirdle	1,458	44.6	−2.3
Liberal Democrats	Martin Eakins	1,352	41.3	+5.5
Conservative	Nathan Cruddas	279	8.5	−4.3
Green	Lance Crookes	182	5.6	+1.1
Majority		106	3.2	−7.9
Turnout		3,271	31.3	+2.0
Labour hold		Swing	-3.9	

=== Old Moat ===
Old Moat
Party	Candidate	Votes	%	±%
Labour	Jeffrey Smith*	1,382	53.7	−0.7
Liberal Democrats	Richard Wilson	748	29.1	+2.2
Green	Alice Coren	230	8.9	−2.1
Conservative	Andrew Perfect	215	8.4	+0.7
Majority		634	24.6	3.0
Turnout		2,575	25.5	−3.7
Labour hold		Swing	-1.4	

=== Rusholme ===
Rusholme
Party	Candidate	Votes	%	±%
Liberal Democrats	Abu Chowdhury*	1,241	42.3	+2.4
Labour	Atiha Chaudry	746	25.4	−2.3
Respect	Nahella Ashraf	535	18.2	−3.0
Green	Penny Collins	224	7.6	+1.1
Conservative	Daniel Valentine	190	6.5	+1.8
Majority		495	16.9	+4.7
Turnout		2,936	30.7	−0.8
Liberal Democrats hold		Swing	+2.3	

=== Sharston ===
Sharston
Party	Candidate	Votes	%	±%
Labour Co-op	Joyce Keller*	1,242	52.5	−2.5
Conservative	Jimmy McCullough	604	25.5	+7.8
Liberal Democrats	Tina Dunican	290	12.3	−3.3
Green	Amanda Collins	229	9.7	−1.8
Majority		638	27.0	−10.3
Turnout		2,365	21.8	+0.4
Labour hold		Swing	-5.1	

=== Whalley Range ===
Whalley Range
Party	Candidate	Votes	%	±%
Liberal Democrats	Faraz Bhatti*	2,030	50.2	+17.6
Labour	Kath Fry	1,418	35.0	−11.1
Green	Mary Candeland	393	9.7	−3.4
Conservative	Tim Langley	206	5.1	−3.0
Majority		612	15.1	+1.6
Turnout		4,047	39.0	+4.5
Liberal Democrats hold		Swing	+14.3	

=== Withington ===
Withington
Party	Candidate	Votes	%	±%
Liberal Democrats	Alison Firth*	1,346	60.7	+12.9
Labour	Andrew Simcock	499	22.5	−5.1
Green	Felicity Paris	216	9.7	−5.6
Conservative	Adele Douglas	157	7.1	−2.2
Majority		847	38.2	+17.9
Turnout		2,218	21.5	−0.8
Liberal Democrats hold		Swing	+9.0	

=== Woodhouse Park ===
Woodhouse Park
Party	Candidate	Votes	%	±%
Labour	Barbara O'Neil*	1,354	65.3	+3.8
Conservative	Stephen Heath	378	18.2	+2.4
Liberal Democrats	Joseph Podbylski	182	8.8	−5.2
Green	Jody Bradford	161	7.8	−0.9
Majority		976	47.0	+1.3
Turnout		2,075	21.2	−0.6
Labour hold		Swing	+0.7	

== Changes between 2007 and 2008 ==
=== Charlestown By-Election 14 June 2007 ===
Charlestown By-Election 14 June 2007
Party	Candidate	Votes	%	±%
Labour	Veronica Kirkpatrick	1,373	54.7	−4.3
BNP	Joseph G M Finnon	628	25.0	+25.0
Liberal Democrats	Carol Connell	239	9.5	−0.8
Conservative	Kim E Glasspole	188	7.5	−8.5
Green	Jackie Smith	81	3.2	−2.5
Majority		745	29.6	−13.3
Turnout		2,509	26.5	−1.3
Labour hold		Swing	-14.6	
