= 2006 Manchester City Council election =

2006 UK local government election

- 4 May 2006

32 of 96 seats to Manchester City Council 49 seats needed for a majority
	First party	Second party	Third party
Leader	Richard Leese	Simon Ashley	Vanessa Hall
Party	Labour	Liberal Democrats	Green
Leader's seat	Crumpsall	Gorton South	Hulme
Last election	57 seats, 43.2%	38 seats, 36.2%	1 seats, 7.8%
Seats before	57	38	1
Seats won	23	9	0
Seats after	61	34	1
Seat change	▲4	▼4	Steady
Popular vote	41,039	28,929	8,493
Percentage	44.8%	31.6%	9.3%
Swing	▲1.6%	▼4.6%	▲1.5%
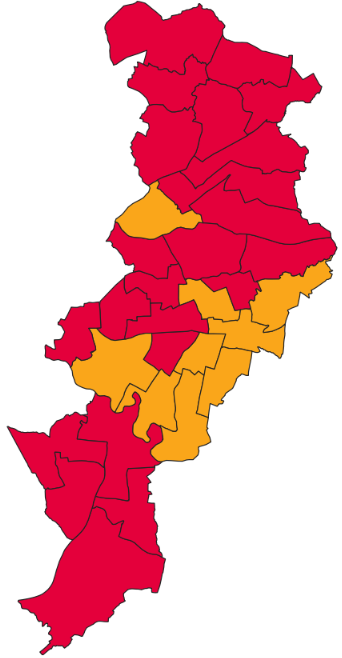
- Map of results of 2006 election
Leader of the Council before election
Richard Leese
Labour
Leader of the Council after election
Richard Leese
Labour

Elections to Manchester City Council were held on 4 May 2006. One third of the council was up for election, with each successful candidate to serve a four-year term of office, expiring in 2010. The council stayed under Labour Party control, strengthened by four gains from the Liberal Democrats.

== Election result ==
Party	Votes		Seats			Full Council	
Labour Party	41,039 (44.8%)	▲1.6	23 (71.9%)	23 / 32	▲4	61 (63.5%)	61 / 96
Liberal Democrats	28,929 (31.6%)	▼4.6	9 (28.1%)	9 / 32	▼4	34 (35.4%)	34 / 96
Green Party	8,493 (9.3%)	▲1.5	0 (0.0%)	0 / 32	Steady	1 (1.0%)	1 / 96
Conservative Party	9,649 (10.5%)	▼0.6	0 (0.0%)	0 / 32	Steady	0 (0.0%)	0 / 96
UKIP	1,128 (1.2%)	▲1.1	0 (0.0%)	0 / 32	Steady	0 (0.0%)	0 / 96
Independent	833 (0.9%)	▲0.6	0 (0.0%)	0 / 32	Steady	0 (0.0%)	0 / 96
BNP	641 (0.7%)	▲0.5	0 (0.0%)	0 / 32	Steady	0 (0.0%)	0 / 96
Respect	615 (0.7%)	▲0.4	0 (0.0%)	0 / 32	Steady	0 (0.0%)	0 / 96
Socialist	214 (0.2%)	N/A	0 (0.0%)	0 / 32	N/A	0 (0.0%)	0 / 96
Independent Liberal	11 (0.0%)	N/A	0 (0.0%)	0 / 32	N/A	0 (0.0%)	0 / 96

↓
1	61	34

== Ward results ==
=== Ancoats and Clayton ===
Ancoats and Clayton
Party	Candidate	Votes	%	±%
Labour	Jim Battle*	1,463	48.3	+2.2
Liberal Democrats	Daniel James Valentine	1,235	40.7	−0.2
Conservative	Christine Joan Birchenough	136	4.5	−0.6
Green	Richard Francis Keatley	126	4.2	−0.5
Independent	John Hulse	71	2.3	−1.2
Majority		228	7.6	+2.0
Turnout		3,031	32.9	−5.1
Labour hold		Swing	+1.2	

=== Ardwick ===
Ardwick
Party	Candidate	Votes	%	±%
Labour	Mavis Smitheman*	1,248	61.4	+15.7
Liberal Democrats	Mohammad Alam Panwar	405	19.9	−7.5
Green	Christopher David Charlton	216	10.6	−2.4
Conservative	Tadeusz Sochacki	163	8.0	+0.9
Majority		843	41.5	+23.2
Turnout		2,032	21.7	−2.7
Labour hold		Swing	+11.6	

=== Baguley ===
Baguley
Party	Candidate	Votes	%	±%
Labour Co-op	Eddie McCulley*	1,205	49.0	−4.8
Conservative	Joyce Kaye	498	20.2	−0.7
Liberal Democrats	Leslie James Ardron	323	13.1	−0.7
Green	Lynne Richmond	220	8.9	−2.5
Socialist	Lynn Worthington	214	8.7	+8.7
Majority		707	28.7	−4.1
Turnout		2,460	23.9	−5.5
Labour hold		Swing	-2.0	

=== Bradford ===
Bradford
Party	Candidate	Votes	%	±%
Labour	John Longsden*	1,525	69.8	+7.7
Liberal Democrats	Rob Brettle	316	14.5	+0.3
Conservative	Karen Abbad	188	8.6	−6.5
Green	Christopher Waldon	156	7.1	−1.6
Majority		1,209	55.3	+14.2
Turnout		2,185	25.3	−4.5
Labour hold		Swing	+3.7	

=== Brooklands ===
Brooklands
Party	Candidate	Votes	%	±%
Labour Co-op	Sue Murphy*	1,378	42.1	−2.7
Conservative	Ralph John Ellerton	953	29.2	−5.1
Liberal Democrats	John Paul Ankers	787	24.1	+10.7
Green	Tamisin MacCarthy-Morrogh	149	4.6	−2.8
Majority		425	13.0	+2.4
Turnout		3,267	33.4	−1.4
Labour hold		Swing	+1.2	

=== Burnage ===
Burnage
Party	Candidate	Votes	%	±%
Liberal Democrats	Rodney Alan Isherwood*	1,460	47.5	−10.4
Labour	Frank Oliver Duffy	1,169	38.0	+12.7
Conservative	Dorothy Helen Keller	252	8.2	−0.5
Green	Elindsay James	149	4.8	−3.2
Majority		291	9.5	−23.1
Turnout		3,073	29.8	−10.3
Liberal Democrats hold		Swing	-11.5	

=== Charlestown ===
Charlestown
Party	Candidate	Votes	%	±%
Labour	Eric Hobin*	1,435	54.3	−4.8
Conservative	Vivienne Inez Clarke	388	14.7	−1.5
Liberal Democrats	Ann Rodgers	348	13.2	−11.5
UKIP	Catherine Andrea Ritchie	312	11.8	+11.8
Green	Helen Sarah Dolan	159	6.0	+6.0
Majority		1,047	39.6	+5.2
Turnout		2,642	29.2	−5.2
Labour hold		Swing	-1.6	

=== Cheetham ===
Cheetham
Party	Candidate	Votes	%	±%
Labour	Naeem Ul Hassam*	1,707	45.6	+0.8
Liberal Democrats	Qassim Afzal	1,608	43.0	+5.9
Green	Jacqueline Smith	235	6.3	+6.3
Conservative	Kim Elvin Glasspole	191	5.1	+2.4
Majority		99	2.6	−5.1
Turnout		3,741	36.2	−11.0
Labour hold		Swing	-2.5	

=== Chorlton ===
Chorlton
Party	Candidate	Votes	%	±%
Labour Co-op	Val Stevens*	1,828	42.0	+9.0
Liberal Democrats	Charles Leslie Glover	1,713	39.4	+6.7
Green	Brian Arthur Candeland	609	14.0	−1.4
Conservative	Amar Rouf Ahmed	198	4.6	−4.0
Majority		115	2.6	+2.3
Turnout		4,348	43.0	−3.9
Labour hold		Swing	+1.1	

=== Chorlton Park ===
Chorlton Park
Party	Candidate	Votes	%	±%
Liberal Democrats	Norman Lewis*	1,724	54.7	+0.7
Labour	Yogesh Virmani	797	25.3	+6.4
Green	Kathryn Mary Brownbridge	399	12.7	−1.1
Conservative	Rodney Keller	229	7.3	+0.0
Majority		927	29.4	+5.6
Turnout		3,149	32.1	−10.9
Liberal Democrats hold		Swing	-2.8	

=== City Centre ===
City Centre
Party	Candidate	Votes	%	±%
Liberal Democrats	Elaine Boyes*	531	38.0	+0.5
Labour Co-op	Chris Paul	374	26.8	−0.8
Conservative	James Jacob Gilchrist Berry	311	22.3	+7.1
Green	Birgit Vollm	181	13.0	−2.0
Majority		157	11.2	+1.3
Turnout		1,397	16.4	−2.4
Liberal Democrats hold		Swing	+0.6	

=== Crumpsall ===
Crumpsall
Party	Candidate	Votes	%	±%
Labour	Jon-Leigh Pritchard*	1,667	49.6	+4.6
Liberal Democrats	Sham Raja	738	21.9	+2.2
Conservative	Adrian Paul Glasspole	476	14.2	−4.3
UKIP	Ernest Robert Willescroft	259	7.7	+7.7
Green	Justine Michelle Hall	223	6.6	−10.1
Majority		929	27.6	+2.4
Turnout		3,363	33.8	−8.0
Labour hold		Swing	+1.2	

=== Didsbury East ===
Didsbury East
Party	Candidate	Votes	%	±%
Liberal Democrats	Anthony Thomas Parkinson*	1,809	45.3	−2.4
Labour	Geoffrey Bridson	1,369	34.3	+2.9
Green	Richard Edgar Gee	459	11.5	+3.4
Conservative	Peter Malcolm Schofield	359	9.0	−3.7
Majority		440	11.0	−5.3
Turnout		3,996	39.1	−9.3
Liberal Democrats hold		Swing	-2.6	

=== Didsbury West ===
Didsbury West
Party	Candidate	Votes	%	±%
Liberal Democrats	Richard Mark Clayton	1,189	42.9	+0.1
Labour	David Clive Ellison	692	25.0	+4.6
Conservative	Peter Girvan Hilton	485	17.5	+2.3
Green	George Stanislaw Czernuszka	329	11.9	−4.2
UKIP	Robert Gutfreund-Walmsley	76	2.7	−2.9
Majority		497	17.9	−4.5
Turnout		2,771	28.0	−8.4
Liberal Democrats hold		Swing	-2.2	

=== Fallowfield ===
Fallowfield
Party	Candidate	Votes	%	±%
Labour	Mike Amesbury	1,357	46.4	+4.1
Liberal Democrats	John-Paul Wilkins*	1,086	37.2	+0.6
Conservative	Cedric Beniston	171	5.9	−3.8
Green	Susan Somerville	168	5.7	−5.7
BNP	Joseph Gerard Marjella Finnon	140	4.8	+4.8
Majority		271	9.3	+3.5
Turnout		2,922	28.1	−2.4
Labour gain from Liberal Democrats		Swing	+1.7	

=== Gorton North ===
Gorton North
Party	Candidate	Votes	%	±%
Labour	Nilofar Siddiqi	1,244	39.7	+0.1
Liberal Democrats	Bernadette Newing*	1,132	36.1	−11.0
Independent	Allan James Grafton	465	14.8	+14.8
Conservative	Patricia Ann Ainscough	144	4.6	−3.5
Green	Rachel Michelle Wilson	78	2.5	−2.8
Independent	David Colin Jones	72	2.3	+2.3
Majority		112	3.6	−3.9
Turnout		3,135	31.4	−1.9
Labour gain from Liberal Democrats		Swing	+5.5	

=== Gorton South ===
Gorton South
Party	Candidate	Votes	%	±%
Liberal Democrats	John Richard Bridges*	1,375	47.8	−7.6
Labour	Julie Reid	1,031	35.8	+8.3
Green	David William Mottram	246	8.5	−1.0
Conservative	Raymond Kenyon	226	7.9	+0.4
Majority		344	12.0	−15.9
Turnout		2,878	26.9	−4.6
Liberal Democrats hold		Swing	-7.9	

=== Harpurhey ===
Harpurhey
Party	Candidate	Votes	%	±%
Labour	Paul Fairweather*	1,420	55.3	−0.3
Liberal Democrats	Gareth David Aubrey	320	12.5	−11.5
UKIP	Roger Porter Bullock	312	12.1	+12.1
Conservative	Ian Beswick	302	11.8	−2.4
Green	Darren Jason Flynn	215	8.4	+8.4
Majority		1,100	42.8	+11.2
Turnout		2,569	22.1	−4.8
Labour hold		Swing	+5.6	

=== Higher Blackley ===
Higher Blackley
Party	Candidate	Votes	%	±%
Labour	Anna Margaret Trotman*	1,477	57.0	−3.4
Conservative	Terence Shannon	506	19.5	−0.3
Liberal Democrats	Barbara Argyropoulos	383	14.8	−4.9
Green	Michael Robert Shaw	226	8.7	+8.7
Majority		971	37.5	−3.1
Turnout		2,592	26.5	−5.8
Labour hold		Swing	-1.5	

=== Hulme ===
Hulme
Party	Candidate	Votes	%	±%
Labour	Nigel Joseph Murphy	816	37.9	+1.8
Liberal Democrats	Oliver West	576	26.7	+7.6
Green	Steven Jonathan Durrant	539	25.0	−12.4
Conservative	Paul Anthony Kierman	96	4.6	−2.7
Independent	Christine Anne Boscott-Shermerdine	53	2.5	+2.5
Independent	Captain Cae Os	43	2.0	+2.0
UKIP	Peter David Reeve	20	0.9	+0.9
Independent Liberal	Charles Anthony Lyn-Lloyd	11	0.5	+0.5
Majority		240	11.1	+9.8
Turnout		2,154	24.1	−1.5
Labour hold		Swing	-2.9	

=== Levenshulme ===
Levenshulme
Party	Candidate	Votes	%	±%
Liberal Democrats	Alexander Cowan*	1,402	50.1	−3.1
Labour	Dermot Sean Zafar	779	27.9	+3.8
Green	Peter Norman Thompson	399	14.3	−2.1
Conservative	William Moore	217	7.8	+1.5
Majority		623	22.3	−6.9
Turnout		2,797	28.4	−4.1
Liberal Democrats hold		Swing	-3.4	

=== Longsight ===
Longsight
Party	Candidate	Votes	%	±%
Labour	Maryam Fazeela Khan	1,687	54.6	+24.4
Liberal Democrats	Mohammed Sajjad*	774	25.1	−19.2
Green	Hassan Ukairo	444	14.4	−1.7
Conservative	Zahir Ali	182	5.9	−3.5
Majority		913	30.0	+15.4
Turnout		3,087	32.3	−6.0
Labour gain from Liberal Democrats		Swing	+21.8	

=== Miles Platting and Newton Heath ===
Miles Platting and Newton Heath
Party	Candidate	Votes	%	±%
Labour	John Flanagan*	1,286	43.5	+6.3
Liberal Democrats	Richard John Wilson	791	26.8	+9.5
BNP	Derek George Adams	501	16.9	+3.4
UKIP	Lisa Ann Duffy	149	5.0	+5.0
Conservative	Brian George Birchenough	134	4.5	−3.0
Green	Anthony James Quinn	96	3.2	−1.9
Majority		495	16.7	−1.1
Turnout		2,957	29.1	−2.9
Labour hold		Swing	-1.6	

=== Moss Side ===
Moss Side
Party	Candidate	Votes	%	±%
Labour	Roy Blake Walters*	1,734	63.7	+3.6
Liberal Democrats	Mohammad Hamza Butt	509	18.7	+1.1
Green	Robin Goater	235	8.6	+0.2
Independent	Reverend Juggla	129	4.7	−2.8
Conservative	Raymond Talbot Wattenbach	116	4.3	−2.1
Majority		1,225	45.0	+2.4
Turnout		2,723	27.8	−0.0
Labour hold		Swing	+1.2	

=== Moston ===
Moston
Party	Candidate	Votes	%	±%
Labour	Bill Risby*	1,774	53.1	−5.2
Conservative	Anthony Gerard Pinder	755	22.6	−2.7
Liberal Democrats	Timothy John Hartley	506	15.2	+3.1
Green	Rose Ann Cameron	303	9.0	+9.0
Majority		1,019	30.5	−2.6
Turnout		3,338	31.2	−6.1
Labour hold		Swing	-1.2	

=== Northenden ===
Northenden
Party	Candidate	Votes	%	±%
Labour	Richard James Cowell*	1,431	46.9	+2.2
Liberal Democrats	Martin Clive Eakins	1,092	35.8	+15.7
Conservative	Nathan James Cruddas	391	12.8	−5.2
Green	Lance David Crookes	136	4.5	−12.6
Majority		339	11.1	−13.5
Turnout		3,050	29.3	−3.6
Labour hold		Swing	-6.7	

=== Old Moat ===
Old Moat
Party	Candidate	Votes	%	±%
Labour	Brian Harrison*	1,567	54.4	+5.0
Liberal Democrats	Tina Maache	773	26.9	−0.4
Green	Robin-Ella Davies	317	11.0	−1.4
Conservative	Daniel Rossall Valentine	221	7.7	−3.2
Majority		794	27.6	+5.4
Turnout		2,878	29.2	−3.2
Labour hold		Swing	+2.7	

=== Rusholme ===
Rusholme
Party	Candidate	Votes	%	±%
Liberal Democrats	Lynne Williams*	1,157	39.9	−16.0
Labour	John Byrne	804	27.7	−0.8
Respect	Nahella Ashraf	615	21.2	+21.2
Green	Penelope Irene Collins	188	6.5	−2.9
Conservative	Barbara Mary Goodall	135	4.7	−1.4
Majority		353	12.2	−15.1
Turnout		2,899	31.5	−6.5
Liberal Democrats hold		Swing	-7.6	

=== Sharston ===
Sharston
Party	Candidate	Votes	%	±%
Labour Co-op	Hugh Barrett*	1,248	55.0	+4.7
Conservative	Agnes Anne Carroll	402	17.7	−1.1
Liberal Democrats	William David Fisher	355	15.6	−0.9
Green	Karen Jane Duffy	264	11.5	−2.9
Majority		846	37.3	+5.8
Turnout		2,269	21.4	−5.6
Labour hold		Swing	+2.9	

=== Whalley Range ===
Whalley Range
Party	Candidate	Votes	%	±%
Labour	Mary Rose Watson	1,637	46.1	+17.4
Liberal Democrats	Joy Ruth Winder*	1,158	32.6	−6.6
Green	Mary Rosalind Candeland	466	13.1	+0.6
Conservative	Matthew Graham Cox	289	8.1	−11.5
Majority		479	13.5	+2.9
Turnout		3,550	34.5	−9.3
Labour gain from Liberal Democrats		Swing	+12.0	

=== Withington ===
Withington
Party	Candidate	Votes	%	±%
Liberal Democrats	Simon David Wheale	1,064	47.8	−10.6
Labour	Delores Elizabeth Long	613	27.6	+9.0
Green	Sarah Stuart	340	15.3	+0.9
Conservative	Andrew Christopher Perfect	207	9.3	+0.7
Majority		451	20.3	−19.5
Turnout		2,224	22.3	−8.4
Liberal Democrats hold		Swing	-9.8	

=== Woodhouse Park ===
Woodhouse Park
Party	Candidate	Votes	%	±%
Labour	Edward Newman*	1,277	61.5	+1.1
Conservative	Ruby Marie Raynor	328	15.8	−0.8
Liberal Democrats	Joseph Francis Podbylski	290	14.0	−0.2
Green	Peter Andrew Somerville	180	8.7	−0.1
Majority		949	45.7	+1.8
Turnout		2,075	21.8	−5.7
Labour hold		Swing	+0.9	

== By-elections between 2006 and 2007 ==
Gorton South By-Election 19 October 2006
Party	Candidate	Votes	%	±%
Liberal Democrats	Charles Glover	1,588	49.3	+1.5
Labour	Julie Reid	1,208	37.5	+1.7
BNP	Derek Adams	185	5.7	+5.7
Green	David Mottram	151	4.7	−3.8
Conservative	Daniel Valentine	90	2.8	−5.1
Majority		380	11.8	−0.2
Turnout		3,222	29.9	+3.0
Liberal Democrats hold		Swing	-0.1	
