= Didsbury West =

Didsbury West (Manchester)
- Electoral ward
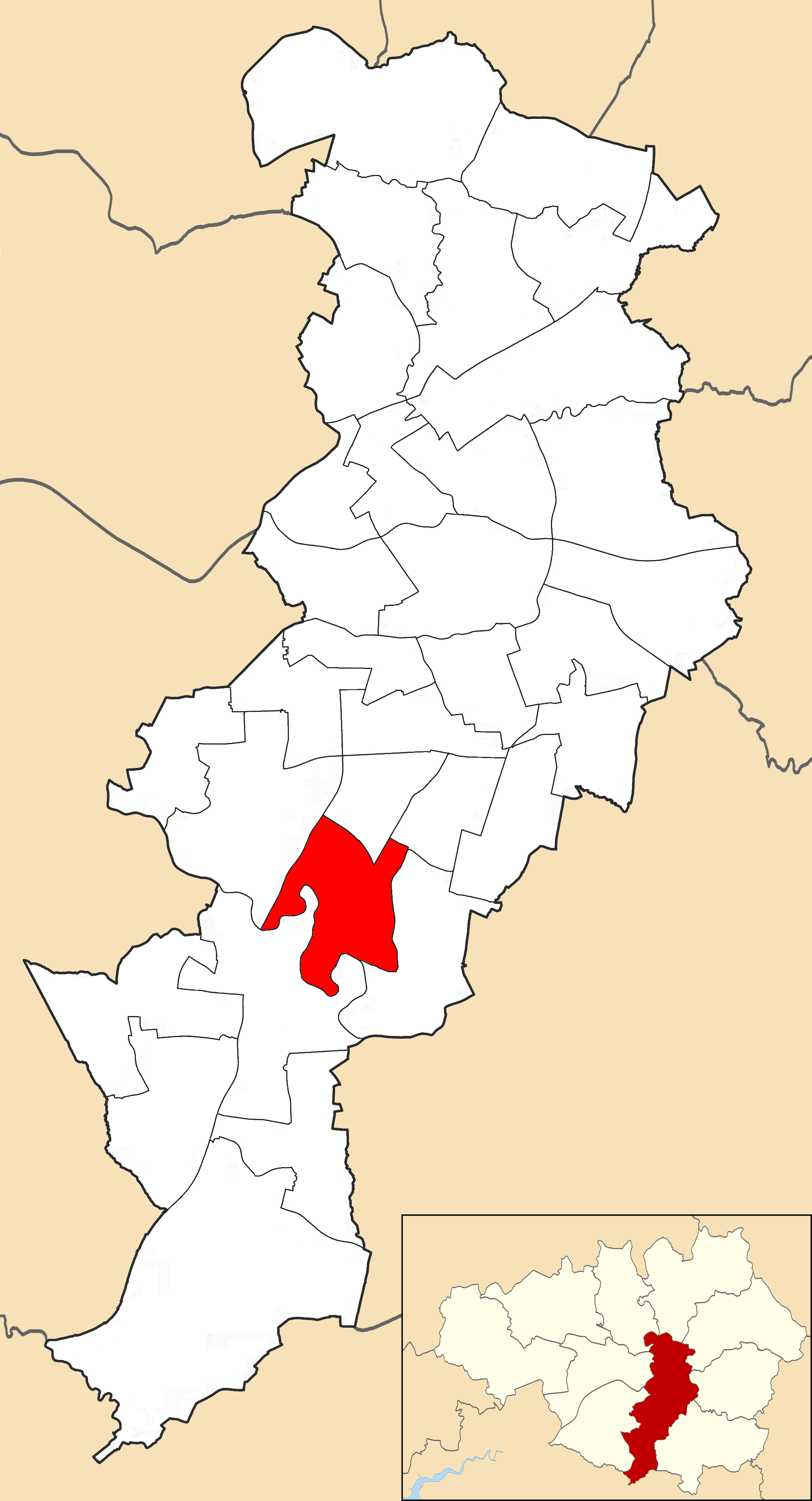
- Didsbury West electoral ward within Manchester City Council

- Coat of arms
- Motto: By wisdom and effort
- Interactive map of Didsbury West (Manchester)
- Coordinates: 53.4186°N 2.2431°W
- Country: United Kingdom
- Constituent country: England
- Region: North West England
- County: Greater Manchester
- Metropolitan borough: Manchester
- Created: 2004
- Named after: Didsbury

Government UK Parliament constituency: Manchester Withington
  - Type: Unicameral
  - Body: Manchester City Council
  - Leader of the council: Bev Craig (Labour)
  - Councillor: Richard Kilpatrick (Liberal Democrats)
  - Councillor: John Leech (Liberal Democrats)
  - Councillor: Debbie Hilal (Labour)

Population
  - Total: 12,455
- Area and population statistics from the 2011 Census

Didsbury West is an electoral ward of the metropolitan borough of Manchester, England. It returns three councillors to Manchester City Council who are currently Richard Kilpatrick, John Leech and Debbie Hilal. It is within the parliamentary constituency of Manchester Withington and represented in Westminster by Jeff Smith. The 2011 Census recorded a population of 12,455.

== Councillors ==
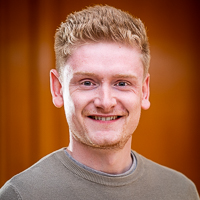
Richard Kilpatrick (Lib Dem)

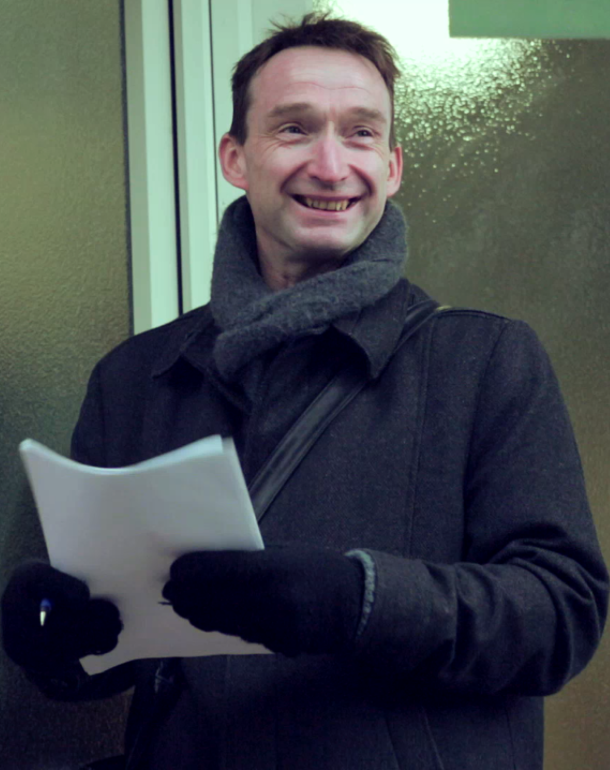
John Leech (Lib Dem)

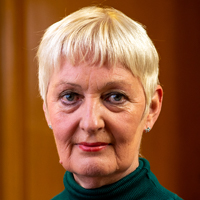
Debbie Hilal (Labour)

Election	Councillor	Councillor	Councillor
2004	Simon Wheale (Lib Dem)	Neil Trafford (Lib Dem)	Graham Shaw (Lib Dem)
2006	Richard Clayton (Lib Dem)	Neil Trafford (Lib Dem)	Graham Shaw (Lib Dem)
2007	Richard Clayton (Lib Dem)	Neil Trafford (Lib Dem)	Graham Shaw (Lib Dem)
2008	Richard Clayton (Lib Dem)	Neil Trafford (Lib Dem)	Graham Shaw (Lib Dem)
By-election; 29 January 2009	Richard Clayton (Lib Dem)	Lianne Williams (Lib Dem)	Graham Shaw (Lib Dem)
2010	Mark Clayton (Lib Dem)	Lianne Williams (Lib Dem)	Graham Shaw (Lib Dem)
2011	Mark Clayton (Lib Dem)	David Ellison (Lab)	Graham Shaw (Lib Dem)
2012	Mark Clayton (Lib Dem)	David Ellison (Lab)	Carl Ollerhead (Lab)
2014	Josie Teubler (Lab)	David Ellison (Lab)	Carl Ollerhead (Lab)
2015	Josie Teubler (Lab)	David Ellison (Lab)	Carl Ollerhead (Lab)
2016	Josie Teubler (Lab)	David Ellison (Lab)	John Leech (Lib Dem)
2018	David Ellison (Lab)	Richard Kilpatrick (Lib Dem)	John Leech (Lib Dem)
2019	Greg Stanton (Lib Dem)	Richard Kilpatrick (Lib Dem)	John Leech (Lib Dem)
2020	Greg Stanton (Lab)	Richard Kilpatrick (Lib Dem)	John Leech (Lib Dem)
2021	Greg Stanton (Lab)	Debbie Hilal (Lab)	John Leech (Lib Dem)
2022	Greg Stanton (Lab)	Debbie Hilal (Lab)	John Leech (Lib Dem)
2023	Richard Kilpatrick (Lib Dem)	Debbie Hilal (Lab)	John Leech (Lib Dem)

indicates seat up for re-election. indicates seat won in by-election. indicates councillor changed party.

== Elections in the 2020s ==
* denotes incumbent councillor seeking re-election.

=== May 2026 ===
2026
Party	Candidate	Votes	%	±%
Liberal Democrats	John Leech*	2,504	44.2	▼9.6
Green	Adam Snape	1,547	27.3	▲20.6
Labour	Ben Williams	1,220	21.5	▼14.8
Reform	Martin Sykes	342	6.0	New
Conservative	Barakat Elkhalifa	54	1.0	▼1.4
Majority		957	16.9	▼0.6
Turnout		5,667	46.5	▲3.9
Liberal Democrats hold		Swing		

=== May 2024 ===
2024
Party	Candidate	Votes	%	±%
Labour	Deborah Louise Hilal*	2,379	43.3	1.6 ▼
Liberal Democrats	Rosie Hughes	2,220	40.4	0.2 ▼
Green	Stanley Charles Parker	677	12.3	5.0 ▲
Conservative	Daniel James Bell	173	3.1	2.2 ▼
Majority		159	2.9	
Rejected ballots		45	0.8	
Turnout		5,494	44.81	
Registered electors		12.262		
Labour hold		Swing	0.7 ▼	

=== May 2023 ===
2023
Party	Candidate	Votes	%	±%
Liberal Democrats	Richard Kilpatrick	2,260	44.3	5.9 ▼
Labour	Leslie Bell	2,047	40.1	6.3 ▲
Green	James Young	592	11.6	1.8 ▲
Conservative	Martin Cartwright	153	3.0	0.9 ▼
SDP	Wendy Andrew	26	0.5	N/A
Majority		213	4.2	12.2 ▼
Rejected ballots		23		
Turnout		5,101		
Registered electors		11,888		
Liberal Democrats hold		Swing	6.1 ▼	

Previous councillor Greg Stanton was elected for the Liberal Democrats in 2019 but defected to Labour; for the purpose of comparison to the 2019 figures this ward is a Lib Dem hold.

=== May 2022 ===
2022
Party	Candidate	Votes	%	±%
Liberal Democrats	John Leech*	2,760	53.8	1.4 ▼
Labour	Luke Savage	1,863	36.3	5.2 ▼
Green	Sally Hawkins	342	6.7	6.1 ▼
Conservative	Luke Bourke Costello	123	2.4	3.6 ▼
SDP	Wendy Andrew	22	0.4	n/a
Majority		897	17.5	
Rejected ballots		25		
Turnout		5,135	42.6	4.9 ▼
Registered electors		12,058		
Liberal Democrats hold		Swing	1.9 ▲	

=== May 2021 ===
2021
Party	Candidate	Votes	%	±%
Labour	Debbie Hilal	2,523	44.9	▲4.5
Liberal Democrats	Richard Kilpatrick*	2,282	40.6	▼3.0
Green	Jake Welsh	408	7.3	▲2.8
Conservative	Luke Bourke Costello	309	5.5	▼0.3
Women's Equality	Sarika Paul	72	1.3	New
SDP	Wendy Andrew	29	0.5	New
Majority		241	4.3	
Rejected ballots		31	0.6	
Turnout		5,654	45.8	1.7 ▼
Registered electors		12,335		
Labour gain from Liberal Democrats		Swing	3.8 ▲	

== Elections in the 2010s ==
=== May 2019 ===
2019
Party	Candidate	Votes	%	±%
Liberal Democrats	Greg Stanton	2,214	50.2%	▲9.1%
Labour	David Ellison*	1,490	33.8%	▼7.7%
Green	Arnold Spencer	430	9.8%	▼3.0%
Conservative	Anjenarra Haque	170	3.9%	▼1.9%
Women's Equality	Sarika Paul	85	1.9%	N/A
Majority		724	16.4%	
Rejected ballots		18	0.73%	
Turnout		4,407	37.60%	▼0.9%
Registered electors		11,717		
Liberal Democrats gain from Labour		Swing	▲8.4%	

=== May 2018 ===
2018
Party	Candidate	Votes	%	±%
Liberal Democrats	John Leech*	2,524	55.2	
Liberal Democrats	Richard Kilpatrick	1,994	43.6	
Labour	David Ellison*	1,899	41.5	
Liberal Democrats	Greg Stanton	1,878	41.1	
Labour	Laura Wright	1,781	39.0	
Labour	Peter Cookson	1,567	34.3	
Green	Arnold Spencer	587	12.8	
Conservative	Connor Walsh	275	6.0	
Conservative	Thomas Beach	271	5.9	
Conservative	Xin Shi	206	4.5	
Majority		21		
Turnout		4,571	47.5	
Liberal Democrats win (new boundaries)				
Liberal Democrats win (new boundaries)				
Labour win (new boundaries)				

Party	Candidates	Seats Won	Votes	Vote %
Liberal Democrats	3	2	6,396	49.27
Labour	3	1	5,247	40.42
Conservative	3	0	752	5.79
Green	1	0	587	4.52

=== May 2016 ===
2016
Party	Candidate	Votes	%	±%
Liberal Democrats	John Leech	2,295	52.61	+24.5%
Labour	Barnaby Edward Lane	1,593	36.52	−7.5%
Green	Arnold James Spencer	244	5.59	−6%
Conservative	Max Dowling	161	3.69	−12%
UKIP	Robert Gutenfreund-Walmsley	69	1.58	−2%
Majority		702	16.09	
Turnout		4,362	44.40	
Liberal Democrats gain from Labour		Swing	16.2%	

- Leech's win signified the first gain for any party in Manchester other than Labour for the first time in six years and provided Manchester with its first opposition for two years.

=== May 2015 ===
2015
Party	Candidate	Votes	%	±%
Labour	Dave Ellison*	2,813	40.0	−4.2
Liberal Democrats	Simon Ashley	2,003	28.5	−2.2
Conservative	David Semple	1,053	15.0	+1.1
Green	Arnold James Spencer	886	12.6	+1.5
UKIP	Robert Gutfreund-Walmsley	228	3.2	N/A
TUSC	Alex Longworth-Dunbar	52	0.7	N/A
Majority		810	11.5	
Turnout		7,035	67.0	+30.1
Labour hold		Swing		

=== May 2014 ===
2014
Party	Candidate	Votes	%	±%
Labour	Josie Teubler	1,457	46.27	+14.12
Liberal Democrats	Mark Clayton	1,295	41.12	−9.07
Green	Glen Marsden	592	15.82	N/A
Conservative	David Robert Semple	397	12.61	−5.05
Majority		162	4.33	
Turnout		3,741	36	
Labour gain from Liberal Democrats		Swing		

=== May 2012 ===
2012
Party	Candidate	Votes	%	±%
Labour	Carl Ollerhead	1,393	47.5	+24.7
Liberal Democrats	Graham Shaw*	909	31.0	−16.2
Green	Gareth Price-Thomas	317	10.8	+0.5
Conservative	Dola Miah	246	8.4	−8.2
Democracy First	Robert Gutfreund-Walmsley	69	2.4	N/A
Majority		484	16	
Turnout		2934	27.9	
Labour gain from Liberal Democrats		Swing		

=== May 2011 ===
2011
Party	Candidate	Votes	%	±%
Labour	David Ellison	1,686	44.2	+19.7
Liberal Democrats	Craig Whittall	1,172	30.7	−15.0
Conservative	Jonathan Millard	530	13.9	−0.4
Green	James Alden	424	11.1	−2.3
Majority		514	13.5	
Turnout		3,812	36.9	
Labour gain from Liberal Democrats		Swing		

=== May 2010 ===
2010
Party	Candidate	Votes	%	±%
Liberal Democrats	Mark Clayton*	3,088	50.2	+3.0
Labour	David Clive Ellison	1,978	32.2	+9.4
Conservative	David Michael Bean	1,086	17.7	+1.1
Majority		1,110	18.0	−6.4
Turnout		6,152	61.4	+33.6
Liberal Democrats hold		Swing	-3.2	

== Elections in 2000s ==
2008
Party	Candidate	Votes	%	±%
Liberal Democrats	Graham Shaw*	1,283	47.2	+1.5
Labour	Jenny Lennox	620	22.8	−1.7
Conservative	David Bean	451	16.6	+2.3
Green	James Alden	281	10.3	−3.1
UKIP	Robert Gutfreund-Walmsley	81	3.0	+0.9
Majority		663	24.4	+3.2
Turnout		2,716	27.8	−1.4
Liberal Democrats hold		Swing	+1.6	

2007
Party	Candidate	Votes	%	±%
Liberal Democrats	Neil Trafford*	1,328	45.7	+2.8
Labour	David Ellison	712	24.5	−0.5
Conservative	Peter Caddick	414	14.3	−3.2
Green	James Alden	389	13.4	+1.5
UKIP	Robert Gutfreund-Walmsley	61	2.1	−0.6
Majority		616	21.2	+3.3
Turnout		2,904	29.2	+1.2
Liberal Democrats hold		Swing	+1.6	

2006
Party	Candidate	Votes	%	±%
Liberal Democrats	Richard Mark Clayton	1,189	42.9	+0.1
Labour	David Clive Ellison	692	25.0	+4.6
Conservative	Peter Girvan Hilton	485	17.5	+2.3
Green	George Stanislaw Czernuszka	329	11.9	−4.2
UKIP	Robert Gutfreund-Walmsley	76	2.7	−2.9
Majority		497	17.9	−4.5
Turnout		2,771	28.0	−8.4
Liberal Democrats hold		Swing	-2.2	

2004
Party	Candidate	Votes	%	±%
Liberal Democrats	Graham Shaw	1,565	42.8	N/A
Liberal Democrats	Neil Trafford*	1,515		
Liberal Democrats	Simon Wheale*	1,476		
Labour	Brendan Turner	745	20.4	N/A
Labour	Emily Lomax	706		
Labour	Peter Copping	627		
Green	Richard Gee	589	16.1	N/A
Green	Robina-Ella Davies	578		
Conservative	Peter Hilton	554	15.1	N/A
Conservative	Sean Ell	503		
Conservative	Jonathan Smith	466		
Green	Clifford Saffer	443		
UKIP	Robert Gutfreund-Walmsley	205	5.6	N/A
Majority		731	22.4	N/A
Turnout		3,658	36.4	N/A
Liberal Democrats win (new seat)				
Liberal Democrats win (new seat)				
Liberal Democrats win (new seat)				
