= John Leech (politician) =

British Liberal Democrat politician

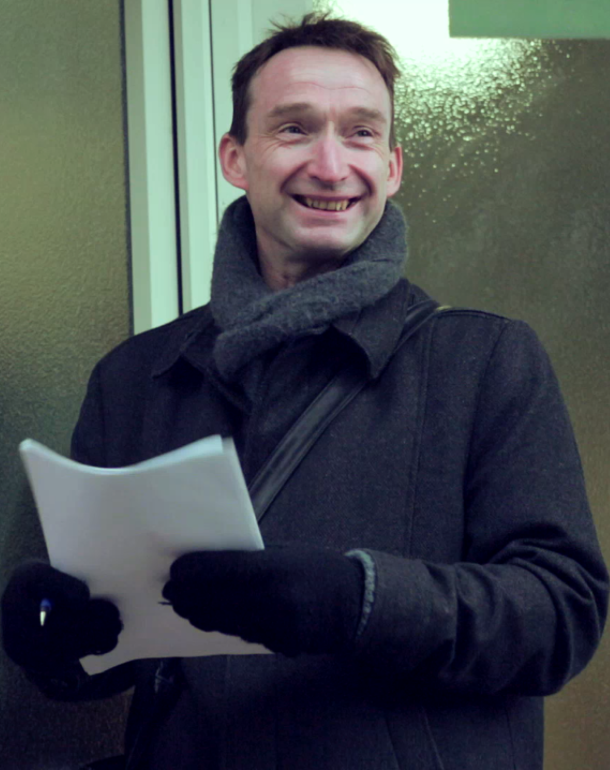

Leader of the Opposition on Manchester City Council
- In office 5 May 2023 – 7 May 2026
- Preceded by: Astrid Johnson
- Succeeded by: Astrid Johnson
- In office 3 May 2022 – 1 July 2022
- Preceded by: Himself (2021)
- Succeeded by: Astrid Johnson
- In office 3 May 2018 – 5 May 2021
- Preceded by: Simon Wheale (2014)
- Succeeded by: Himself (2022)

Member of Parliament for Manchester Withington
- In office 5 May 2005 – 30 March 2015
- Preceded by: Keith Bradley
- Succeeded by: Jeff Smith

Member of Manchester City Council
- Incumbent
- Assumed office 5 May 2016
- Preceded by: Carl Ollerhead
- Constituency: Didsbury West
- Majority: 702 (16.09%)
- In office 7 May 1998 – 8 May 2008
- Preceded by: Arthur Maloney
- Succeeded by: Bernie Ryan
- Constituency: Barlow Moor (1998–2004); Chorlton Park (2004–2008)

Personal details
- Born: John Sampson Macfarlane Leech; 11 April 1971 (age 55) Hastings, England
- Party: Liberal Democrat
- Education: Brunel University
- Website: mcrlibdems.uk

John Sampson Macfarlane Leech (born 11 April 1971) is a British Liberal Democrat politician who was Member of Parliament for Manchester Withington from 2005 to 2015. Since 2016, he has represented Didsbury West on Manchester City Council.

He is best known for Alan Turing's pardon, and the Alan Turing law which granted a posthumous pardon to more than 49,000 men convicted of gross indecency. He was also the first MP to speak out against the bedroom tax in Parliament.

Leech served on the city council from 1998 and was elected to the House of Commons at the 2005 general election. In the 2005–2010 Parliament he was a member of the Transport Select Committee and a Shadow Transport Spokesperson on the Liberal Democrat frontbench team from 2006 to 2010, when the Liberal Democrats entered a coalition with the Conservatives. He held his seat with an increased majority in 2010. He has campaigned in particular on gay rights, affordable housing and refugees.

He played a role in the campaign to outlaw homophobic chanting at football matches, and put pressure on leaders in Greater Manchester to take on Syrian child refugees. He lost his Parliamentary seat at the 2015 general election, but was elected to Manchester City Council a year later as the sole opposition member. He was Leader of the Opposition on the council from 2018 to 2021, and for two months in 2022.

== Early life ==
Leech was born in Hastings and grew up in Chorlton-cum-Hardy, where his father was a minister at Chorlton Methodist Church. He attended the private Manchester Grammar School, Loreto College and Brunel University where he studied History and Politics and also joined the Liberal Democrats. He received an upper-second class honours degree on graduating. After leaving university he worked as a trainee manager for McDonald's and part-time at the RAC in Stretford as a call centre insurance claims handler.

== Political career ==
Leech was elected to Manchester City Council in 1998 winning the Barlow Moor ward from Labour with a 12% swing. He was re-elected in 2002, increasing his majority. In 2004, the whole council was contested due to boundary changes and Leech won a seat for Chorlton Park, which covered most of the former Barlow Moor ward area. He became the deputy leader of the council's opposition group and spokesperson for Planning and the Environment.

=== First term (2005–2010) ===
Leech was elected to parliament at the 2005 general election, defeating Keith Bradley, the incumbent Labour MP, with a swing of over 17%—the largest swing in the country that year. He was the first Liberal or Liberal Democrat to win a Manchester seat since 1929. Leech is one of only two Lib Dem MPs to win their seat despite it not being on the national party's 'target list'.

In 2006, Leech was the Shadow Transport Spokesperson on the Liberal Democrat frontbench team. He continued in the role under Nick Clegg. He was the first Patchwork MP of the Year for his "tireless work with minority and ethnic groups" and Brake's MP of the Year and MP of the Month twice, for work on road safety in his constituency.

=== Second term (2010–2015) ===
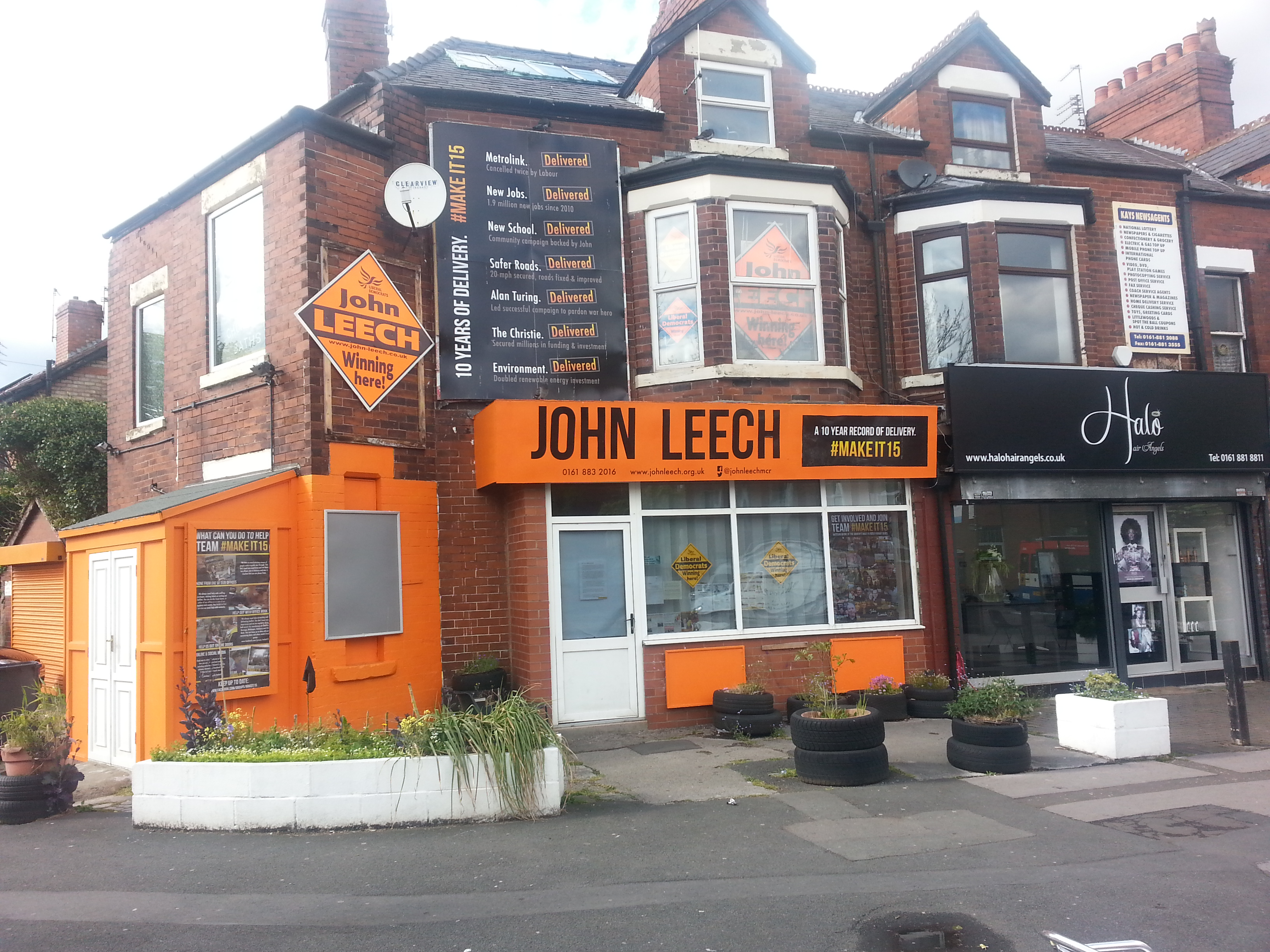
John Leech's campaign office 2015

Leech voted against entering the 2010 Liberal Democrat/Conservative Coalition Government.

He was one of 21 MPs to vote against the increased tuition fees bill. Leech also voted against the under-occupancy penalty (commonly called the 'bedroom tax'), and was the first MP to speak out against the bill in Parliament. He voted against a pay rise for MPs in 2013.

He designed the 'Alan Turing Law' bill which led to the eventual posthumous pardon of Alan Turing and tens of thousands of other criminally convicted gay people.

In early 2015, an article in the Manchester Evening News reported that Leech was the second-most rebellious MP in the North of England and the second-most rebellious Lib Dem MP.

In early 2015, he launched his re-election campaign, with the slogan 'Make it 15'. Amid a UK-wide collapse in support for the Liberal Democrats, Leech lost his seat to Labour.

A news article published in 2016 claimed Leech had completed more than 111,000 pieces of casework during his ten years in parliament, based on analysis from 'Write To Them'. However, as there is no accepted definition of what qualifies as casework, this is impossible to verify.

=== Expenses ===
In the 2009 expenses scandal, it was reported that Leech claimed one of the lowest levels of expenses of any MP in the North of England. In May 2009, Leech was listed among the "saints" by The Daily Telegraph in the expenses scandal for not needing to pay back any of his expenses.

=== After Parliament and re-election to council (2015–2018) ===
After losing the seat, Leech said he would stand in the Manchester City Council elections in May 2016.

Leech stood in Didsbury West and won the seat from Labour with a 25% swing, picking up 53% of the vote. Didsbury West was the most contested seat in the city with an unusually high turnout of 45%. The Manchester Evening News described the result as "historic", signifying the first gain for any party in Manchester other than Labour for the first time in six years and providing the city with its first opposition for two years. Leech was the only opposition member of the 2016–18 council, with Labour holding 95 of the 96 seats.

=== Leader of the Opposition on Manchester Council (2018–) ===
In 2018, Leech launched the Liberal Democrat 'Manchester Together' campaign and manifesto.

During the election campaign, Leech released a film showing young children watching television and reacting to controversial news headlines, including then-recent comments about women made by Withington councillor Chris Paul. A spokesperson for the Manchester Liberal Democrats defended the film, stating that it was "an uncomfortable truth about Manchester Council."

Leech was re-elected to Manchester City Council in May 2018, topping the ballot and increasing his share of the vote to 55% with a turnout of just under 50%, unusually high for a local election. He was selected as Leader of the Opposition.

In an opinion piece written on the day the UK left the EU, Leech said Brexit was "not in our [Lib Dems] name, and we will fight back." He called for members and activists to "fight for a progressive and optimistic future because it’s the right thing to do. And look forward to sharing that future once again with our European neighbours and friends with hope, courage and confidence in our hearts."

Leech was re-elected in the 2022 local elections with an increased majority, despite a "mammoth effort" from Labour to unseat him.

=== COVID-19 pandemic ===
In March 2020, Leech warned of fake news being created to exploit the COVID-19 pandemic.

In May, Leech raised concerns about the lack of support for bus companies in Greater Manchester and urged the Greater Manchester Transport Committee (GMTC) to increase funding to ensure public transport didn't collapse during the pandemic.

On 15 October 2020, Leech endorsed a Tier 3 lockdown for Greater Manchester saying "nothing eclipses public health", and accused the region's leaders of being "completely irresponsible". The position was in direct contradiction with the Labour leaders in Greater Manchester including Mayor Andy Burnham and Council Leader Sir Richard Leese.

On 19 October 2020, Leech wrote to Royal Mail and asked them to carry letters, large envelopes, packets and parcels up to 2 kg addressed to and from residents in nursing homes, residential accommodation in the mental health or disability sectors and convalescent homes for free until January 31.

On 22 October 2020, Leech slammed Boris Johnson for "not living in the real world" after the PM said he 'couldn't live on £150,000 a year' weeks before cutting minimum wage furlough support to 80% in Manchester.

On 27 October 2020, Leech called for footballer Marcus Rashford to be awarded Manchester's Freedom of the City award for his child food poverty campaign during the Coronavirus pandemic.

In October 2020, Leech was awarded a Special Commendation for a Lifetime Achievement and Dedication to Public Service award from over 300 nominations whilst the panel noted he had delivered more than 800 food parcels to local people during the pandemic.

== Campaigns ==
In 2005 Leech campaigned for the Metrolink tram system to come through his constituency. In 2012 it began running through south Manchester, terminating at East Didsbury.

Leech campaigned to reduce the stake on fixed odds betting terminals (FOBTs) from £100 to £2. The issue received cross-party support and was supported by campaign groups including Stop The FOBT's. A bill he introduced to have the Statutory Instrument (SI) reduced to £50 FOBT threshold in February 2015 was defeated.

For many years Leech campaigned against homophobia and for same-sex marriage. In 2013, he ran a campaign calling for homophobic chants at football matches to be outlawed. Leech is often described as the architect of the campaign to pardon Alan Turing, who was convicted of homosexuality and later died of suicide. He submitted a bill calling for a formal pardon, and at the UK premiere of a film based on Turing's life, The Imitation Game, the producers thanked him for bringing the topic to public attention and securing Turing's pardon. His campaign then turned to acquiring pardons for the 75,000 other men convicted of the same crime. Leech said it was "utterly disgusting and ultimately just embarrassing" that the conviction was upheld as long as it was, and celebrated the posthumous pardon. Leech's campaign gained public support from popular physicists such as Stephen Hawking. In November 2018 after The Bank of England invited members of the public to vote on which figure should appear on the new £50 note, Leech said it should be Alan Turing so as to "serve as a stark and frankly painful reminder of what we lost in Turing" A number of Leech's campaign posters, letters and campaign material went on display at the Manchester Museum of Science and Industry after the Bank of England announced Turing as the new face on the £50 note.

Leech led a campaign for safe standing at football matches. Standing has been banned in English football's top two divisions following the Taylor Report into the 1989 Hillsborough disaster. Leech told the Commons that clubs should be allowed to install 'rail-seating' allowing supporters to stand with the option of sitting down following the lead of countries including Germany, Austria and Sweden that operate safe standing.

Leech campaigned to remain during the 2016 EU referendum.

On 5 October 2016, Leech said that Manchester had not accepted any refugees under the Government's 2015 resettlement scheme due to disagreements with funding. He accused the council of being "sickeningly shallow" and demanded it commit to housing 50 Syrian refugee families and as many unaccompanied Syrian refugee children as possible. The council was vague in its response but said 'Manchester would play its part.'

Leech has criticised the city council's attitude towards homelessness.

In January 2017, Leech revealed statistics about the number of sexual attacks linked to the dating apps Tinder and Grindr. In March he called on the council to implement 'Ask for Angela', a scheme to help people get out of uncomfortable situations in bars and pubs, to which the council agreed.

In September 2017, Leech launched a Manchester-based campaign to tackle what he described as an "appalling" rise in homophobic and transphobic bullying in local schools.

In September 2017, Leech released a report on homophobic and transphobic bullying in Manchester's schools. It revealed that incidents had doubled in the last two years. Speaking at the Liberal Democrats conference, he said 'We have absolutely no right to claim we live in a decent society when this kind of behaviour is still rife in our schools.' Seventeen schools refused to take part in his report which he criticised as a 'worrying lack of transparency'. Leech pledged to work with schools, LGBT+ groups and called on both Manchester Council and the UK Government to work harder to 'stamp out the deplorable behaviour'.

Also in September 2017, Leech delivered a speech at the Liberal Democrats Conference in which he called on the Government to take a more proactive role in youth crime. He criticised Government cuts but also spoke of the need for police to become role models in their communities and "completely immerse themselves in their communities to really get to know local people and earn their trust." Leech worked with youth charity Kids Count to work to a solution.

In October 2018, Leech criticised the shortlisting of two companies for a £330m contract to renovate Manchester Town Hall. He said that "Under absolutely no circumstances" should Lendlease ever be considered for a council contract again until they paid a £3m Grenfell-style cladding bill in the Green Quarter of Manchester. In January 2019, Lendlease was announced as the winner of the contract. Leech criticised the decision and said it showed a lack of concern for local people.

In an opinion piece for Manchester Confidential, Leech stated he was seeking to implement special paid leave for Manchester Council employees seeking gender reassignment treatment, comparing it to any other health-related appointment.

In August 2020, Leech wrote to the Big Five tech giants – Amazon, Apple, Google, Facebook and Microsoft – urging them to donate £400,000 each to secure the future of the Bletchley Park trust where Turing did much of his work after the organisation announced it was to lose more than £2m and cut a third of its workforce. Leech said the trust was important for protecting Turing's legacy and that the country "mustn’t be allowed to forget the dark stain in our history" – referring to Turing's treatment and conviction for homosexuality.

In September 2020, Leech blamed a "toxic social atmosphere" created by PM Boris Johnson for a rise in attacks against the LGBTQ+ community.

== Awards ==
In 2005, Politics.co.uk gave him the magazine's monthly ‘Top MP’ honour for his campaign to outlaw homophobic chanting at football matches.

in 2008, He won Brake's Road Safety MP of the Year for his work to reduce speed limits in his constituency.

in 2010, UK Lung Cancer Coalition awarded him their 'Parliamentary Champion' award for his work to improve cancer services in Greater Manchester.

in 2011, Former Spice Girl Geri Halliwell presented him the Breast Cancer Campaigner award.

In 2013, Leech won the first-ever Patchwork MP of the Year award for his work with LGBT and BAME groups.

In 2020, he was awarded a Special Commendation for a 'Lifetime Achievement and Dedication to Public Service' for his work in the LGBTQ+ community from over 300 nominations.

== International relations ==
John Leech has campaigned to improve and progress liberal parties across Europe. In the 2019 EU elections, he worked with the Liberal Democrats' sister party D66 to deliver a campaign aimed at young people. He highlighted the importance of voting for pro-European parties in the elections citing Brexit as his reasoning.

At an event held in central Utrecht, Leech told the audience that Brexit was "destroying the soul" of the UK whilst in a video for D66 he told Dutch voters that "if anyone knew the impact of not voting for pro-Europe parties, it was us [British people]."

In a press conference in Utrecht, he said the saddest thing about Brexit was losing the close and long relationship the Netherlands and the UK have had for generations.

== Personal life ==
Leech is an amateur dramatics enthusiast with Manchester Road Players. He is a supporter of Manchester City F.C. and was a member of the Parliamentary Football team.

== Harassment ==
In November 2016 police investigated a number of "very serious" threats directed at Leech on Twitter. One tweet received on 6 October 2016, was in response to Leech being invited to a walking basketball event at the Amaechi Basketball Centre in Whalley Range. Leech responded: "Thinking about coming down one time this month. How is 23rd or 30th for you guys?" An anonymous user then entered the conversation to say: "Excellent I'll bring the knuckle dusters." Police advised Leech not to post his schedule publicly and to temporarily pause his advice surgeries whilst the force worked with Twitter to find the user. Lib Dems did not press charges.

During the 2017 General Election police investigated a number of theft and intimidation reports. The activists boasted about stealing garden posters on Twitter, publicly planned where to target next and posed in pictures with the posters in balaclavas.

== Controversy ==
In July 2013 correspondence between Leech and a constituent attracted mixed reactions. In the letter, the constituent accused Leech of trying to "brainwash children" into supporting homosexuality after Leech led a report on eradicating homophobia from football. Responding to the constituent, Leech wrote that the majority of people "are sick and tired of a small minority of homophobic people like you". The constituent claimed he would not vote for Leech based on his "obsession with that Turing bloke", referring to Leech's campaign to pardon Alan Turing. Responding, Leech said he "did not seek the vote of homophobes", signing off with "You are, of course, entitled to hold your offensive views, but please do not bother to waste my time, and yours, by expressing them to me." The exchange attracted praise from the LGBT community.

On 12 February 2019 Leech sparked controversy when he tweeted that a potential council policy, which was still out for public consultation, was "absolute crap". Manchester Council announced it was consulting the public on a new Public Spaces Protection Order (PSPO) which, among other things, targeted 'aggressive' begging and rough sleepers who pitch tents or sleep in doorways. When asked to clarify his comments by local media, Leech refused to apologise and instead went on to describe the policy as a "Homeless Tax", "social cleansing" and promised his party would "oppose it until the end of time."

On 8 March 2019, at a routine council budget meeting, a row broke out. The argument was prompted by a sign put up by Labour above the Lord Mayor's chair at the front of the council chamber, reading '10 Years of Tory And Lib Dem Cuts'. When Leech entered the chamber, he took down the message—prompting senior Labour Councillor Pat Karney to 'thunder' across the chamber. He began 'screaming' and 'shouting' at Leech and told him to hand over the laminated A4 pieces of paper at least 11 times, according to Manchester Evening News journalist Jen Williams, who filmed and reported the events.

Parliament of the United Kingdom
Preceded by Keith Bradley	Member of Parliament for Manchester, Withington; 2005–2015	Succeeded by Jeff Smith
