= Chorlton Park (ward) =

Electoral ward in Manchester, England

Chorlton Park (Manchester)
- Electoral ward
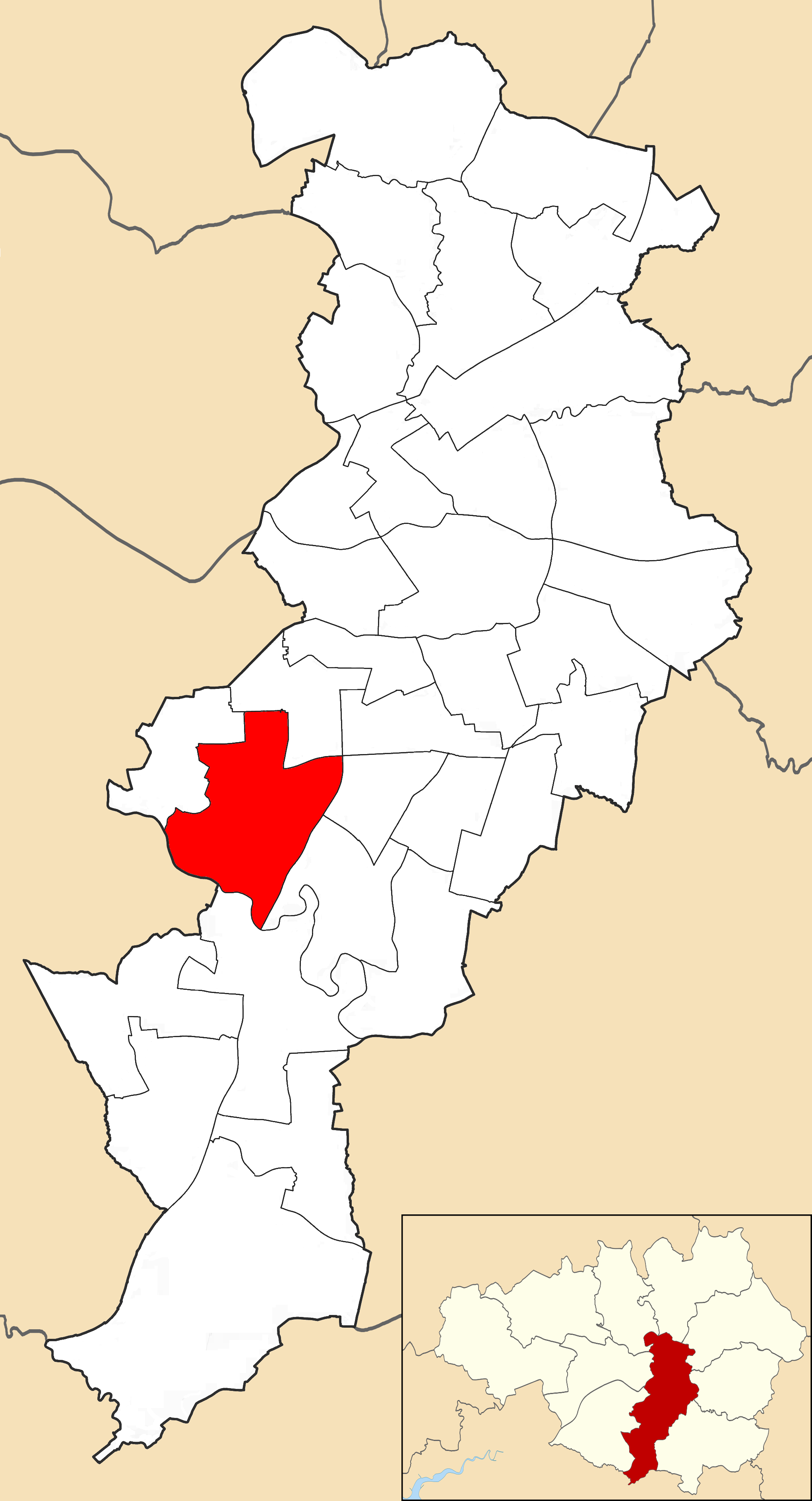
- Chorlton Park electoral ward within Manchester City Council

- Coat of arms
- Motto: By wisdom and effort
- Interactive map of Chorlton Park (Manchester)
- Coordinates: 53.4304°N 2.2631°W
- Country: United Kingdom
- Constituent country: England
- Region: North West England
- County: Greater Manchester
- Metropolitan borough: Manchester
- Created: 2004
- Named after: Chorlton Park

Government
  - Type: Unicameral
  - Body: Manchester City Council
  - Leader of the council: Bev Craig (Labour)
  - Councillor: Grace Tudor-Worrall (Green)
  - Councillor: Dave Rawson (Labour)
  - Councillor: Mandie Shilton Godwin (Labour Co-operative)

Population
  - Total: 15,147
- UK Parliamentary Constituency: Manchester Withington
- Member of Parliament: Jeff Smith
- UK Parliamentary Constituency: Manchester Gorton
- Member of Parliament: Afzal Khan
- Area and population statistics from the 2011 Census

Chorlton Park is an area and electoral ward of Manchester, England. Different parts of this ward are represented by different MPs following boundary changes in 2018; the majority of the ward is part of the Manchester Withington constituency but a portion is part of the Manchester Gorton constituency. The 2011 Census recorded a population of 15,147.

== Councillors ==
Three councillors serve the ward: Dave Rawson (Lab), Mandie Shilton Godwin (Lab Co-op), and Grace Tudor-Worrall (Grn).

Election	Councillor	Councillor	Councillor
2018	Dave Rawson (Lab)	Mandie Shilton Godwin (Lab Co-op)	Joanna Midgley (Lab)
2019	Dave Rawson (Lab)	Mandie Shilton Godwin (Labour Co-op)	Joanna Midgley (Lab)
2021	Dave Rawson (Lab)	Mandie Shilton Godwin (Labour Co-op)	Joanna Midgley (Lab)
2022	Dave Rawson (Lab)	Mandie Shilton Godwin (Labour Co-op)	Joanna Midgley (Lab)
2023	Dave Rawson (Lab)	Mandie Shilton Godwin (Labour Co-op)	Joanna Midgley (Lab)
2024	Dave Rawson (Lab)	Mandie Shilton Godwin (Labour Co-op)	Joanna Midgley (Lab)
2026	Dave Rawson (Lab)	Mandie Shilton Godwin (Labour Co-op)	Grace Tudor-Worrall (Grn)

indicates seat up for re-election.

== Elections in 2020s ==
* denotes incumbent councillor seeking re-election.

=== May 2026 ===
2026
Party	Candidate	Votes	%	±%
Green	Grace Tudor-Worrall	2,474	40.5	▲26.5
Labour Co-op	Joanna Midgley*	2,358	38.6	▼33.9
Reform	Lee Dawson	495	8.1	New
Liberal Democrats	Jack Holliss	342	5.6	▼1.7
Conservative	Peter Gough	150	2.5	▼3.1
Workers Party	Fassah Bibi	259	4.2	New
SDP	Hamed Aden	24	0.4	New
Majority		116	1.9	N/A
Turnout		6,102	45.8	▲9.1
Green gain from Labour Co-op		Swing		

=== May 2024 ===
2024
Party	Candidate	Votes	%	±%
Labour Co-op	Mandie Shilton Godwin*	3,235	63.2	6.0 ▼
Green	Richard Miles Stubbs Walton	1,222	23.9	9.9 ▲
Liberal Democrats	Chris Rogers	366	7.1	1.2 ▼
Conservative	Keith Berry	230	4.5	4.0 ▼
Majority		2,013	39.3	
Rejected ballots		67	1.3	
Turnout		5,120	38.76	
Registered electors		13,210		
Labour hold		Swing	7.9 ▼	

=== May 2023 ===
2023
Party	Candidate	Votes	%	±%
Labour	Dave Rawson*	3,065	67.1	12.8 ▲
Green	Richard Walton	810	17.7	−4.3 ▼
Liberal Democrats	Amaan Hashmi	434	9.5	−8.6 ▼
Conservative	Andrew Tang	228	5.0	−0.7 ▼
Majority		2,255	49.4	17.3 ▲
Rejected ballots		34	0.7	-0.2 ▼
Turnout		4,571	35.6	−1.5 ▼
Registered electors		12,845		
Labour hold		Swing	8.6 ▲	

=== May 2022 ===
2022
Party	Candidate	Votes	%	±%
Labour Co-op	Joanna Midgley*	3,450	72.5	9.0 ▲
Green	Richard Walton	664	14.0	1.5 ▲
Liberal Democrats	Amaan Hashmi	349	7.3	18.1 ▼
Conservative	Andrew Tang	269	5.6	0.8 ▲
Majority		2,786	58.5	
Rejected ballots		29		
Turnout		4,732	36.7	4.6 ▼
Registered electors		12,962		
Labour Co-op hold		Swing	3.8 ▲	

=== May 2021 ===
2021
Party	Candidate	Votes	%	±%
Labour Co-op	Mandie Shilton Godwin*	3,819	69.2	6.7 ▲
Green	Richard Walton	773	14.0	6.0 ▲
Conservative	Connor Cooper	472	8.5	4.5 ▲
Liberal Democrats	Amaan Hashmi	457	8.3	17.2 ▼
Majority		3046	55.2	
Rejected ballots		65	1.2	
Turnout		5,586	42.3	1.0 ▲
Registered electors		13,218		
Labour Co-op hold		Swing	0.4 ▲	

== Elections in 2010s ==
=== May 2019 ===
2019
Party	Candidate	Votes	%	±%
Labour	Dave Rawson*	2,577	54.3	▼1.0
Green	Mary Candeland	1,042	22.0	▲9.5
Liberal Democrats	Amaan Hashmi	857	18.1	▼5.0
Conservative	Christopher Halliday	269	5.7	▲1.7
Majority		1,535	32.1	▲2.2
Rejected ballots		42	0.88	
Turnout		4,787	37.10	▼4.2
Registered electors		12,904		
Labour hold		Swing	▼5.25	

=== May 2018 ===
2018
Party	Candidate	Votes	%	±%
Labour	Joanna Midgley*	3,404	63.5	
Labour	Mandie Shilton-Godwin*	3,027	56.5	
Labour	Dave Rawson*	2,967	55.3	
Liberal Democrats	Rosie Hughes	1,363	25.4	
Liberal Democrats	Amaan Hashmi	1,238	23.1	
Liberal Democrats	Sebastian Bate	1,234	23.0	
Green	Mary Candeland	669	12.5	
Green	Brian Candeland	530	9.9	
Conservative	Keith Berry	255	4.8	
Conservative	Kelly Geddes	197	3.7	
Conservative	Andrew Tang	155	2.9	
Majority				
Turnout		5,362	41.3	
Labour win (new boundaries)				
Labour win (new boundaries)				
Labour win (new boundaries)				

Party	Candidates	Seats Won	Votes	Vote %
Labour	3	3	9,398	62.49
Liberal Democrats	3	0	3,835	25.50
Green	2	0	1,199	7.97
Conservative	3	0	607	4.04

=== May 2016 ===
2016
Party	Candidate	Votes	%	±%
Labour	Joanna Rachel Midgley*	2,564	50.29	
Liberal Democrats	Norman Lewis	1,950	38.25	
Green	Hannah Lisa Richmond	412	8.08	
Conservative	Luke Oisin Bourke Costello	172	3.37	
Majority		614	12.04	
Turnout		5,098	45.17	
Labour hold		Swing		

=== May 2015 ===
2015
Party	Candidate	Votes	%	±%
Labour	Dave Rawson	3,378	42.5	−5.9
Liberal Democrats	Norman Lewis	2,505	31.6	−1.3
Green	Hannah Lisa Richmond	1,282	16.1	+4.7
Conservative	William Stobart	780	9.8	+2.6
Majority		873	10.9	
Turnout		7,945	67.5	+28.6
Labour hold		Swing		

=== May 2014 ===
2014
Party	Candidate	Votes	%	±%
Labour Co-op	Mandie Shilton Godwin	1,991	43.41	+11.01
Liberal Democrats	Norman Lewis*	1,691	36.87	−16.43
Green	Brian Candeland	648	14.13	+7.63
Conservative	Stuart Richardson	256	5.58	2.22
Majority		300	6.5	
Turnout		4,586	39.14	
Labour gain from Liberal Democrats		Swing		

=== May 2012 ===
2012
Party	Candidate	Votes	%	±%
Labour	Joanna Midgley	2,083	56.2	+32.2
Liberal Democrats	Bernie Ryan*	1,115	30.1	−23.3
Green	Leon Patsalides	354	9.6	−1.7
Conservative	Leo Schindler	156	4.2	−7.1
Majority		968	26	
Turnout		3,708	32.8	
Labour gain from Liberal Democrats		Swing		

=== May 2011 ===
2011
Party	Candidate	Votes	%	±%
Labour	Ian Hyde	2,098	48.4	+25.0
Liberal Democrats	Tony Bethell*	1,427	32.9	−22.5
Green	Rebecca Willmott	493	11.4	−1.1
Conservative	Henry Hill	313	7.2	−1.6
Majority		671	15.5	
Turnout		4,331	38.9	
Labour gain from Liberal Democrats		Swing		

=== May 2010 ===
2010
Party	Candidate	Votes	%	±%
Liberal Democrats	Norman Lewis*	3,605	53.3	−0.1
Labour	Ian Hyde	2,193	32.4	+8.4
Conservative	Mohammed Afzal	524	7.8	−3.5
Green	James Alden	493	7.2	−4.0
Majority		1,412	20.9	−8.4
Turnout		6,815	63.9	+33.4
Liberal Democrats hold		Swing	-4.2	

== Elections in 2000s ==
2008
Party	Candidate	Votes	%	±%
Liberal Democrats	Bernie Ryan	1,693	53.4	−2.0
Labour Co-op	John Hacking	763	24.0	+0.6
Green	Kathryn Brownbridge	359	11.3	−1.2
Conservative	Christopher Green	358	11.3	+2.5
Majority		930	29.3	−2.7
Turnout		3,173	30.5	−0.5
Liberal Democrats hold		Swing	-1.3	

2007
Party	Candidate	Votes	%	±%
Liberal Democrats	Tony Bethell*	1,751	55.4	+0.7
Labour Co-op	John Hacking	739	23.4	−1.9
Green	Kathryn Brownbridge	394	12.5	−0.2
Conservative	Robert Chilton	279	8.8	+1.5
Majority		1,012	32.0	+2.6
Turnout		3,163	31.0	−1.1
Liberal Democrats hold		Swing	+1.3	

2006
Party	Candidate	Votes	%	±%
Liberal Democrats	Norman Lewis*	1,724	54.7	+0.7
Labour	Yogesh Virmani	797	25.3	+6.4
Green	Kathryn Mary Brownbridge	399	12.7	−1.1
Conservative	Rodney Keller	229	7.3	+0.0
Majority		927	29.4	+5.6
Turnout		3,149	32.1	−10.9
Liberal Democrats hold		Swing	-2.8	

2004
Party	Candidate	Votes	%	±%
Liberal Democrats	John Leech*	2,113	48.3	N/A
Liberal Democrats	Tony Bethell	1,970		
Liberal Democrats	Norman Lewis	1,936		
Labour	Elizabeth Morgan	1,073	24.5	N/A
Labour	David Ellison	871		
Labour	Bernice Reid*	848		
Green	Kathryn Brownbridge	605	13.8	N/A
Green	George Czernuszka	461		
Green	John Cummings	379		
Conservative	Richard Mason	319	7.3	N/A
Respect	Ismail Farhat	262	6.0	N/A
Majority		863	23.8	N/A
Turnout		4,372	43.0	N/A
Liberal Democrats win (new seat)				
Liberal Democrats win (new seat)				
Liberal Democrats win (new seat)				
