= Ask for Angela =

Campaign in England to prevent sexual assault

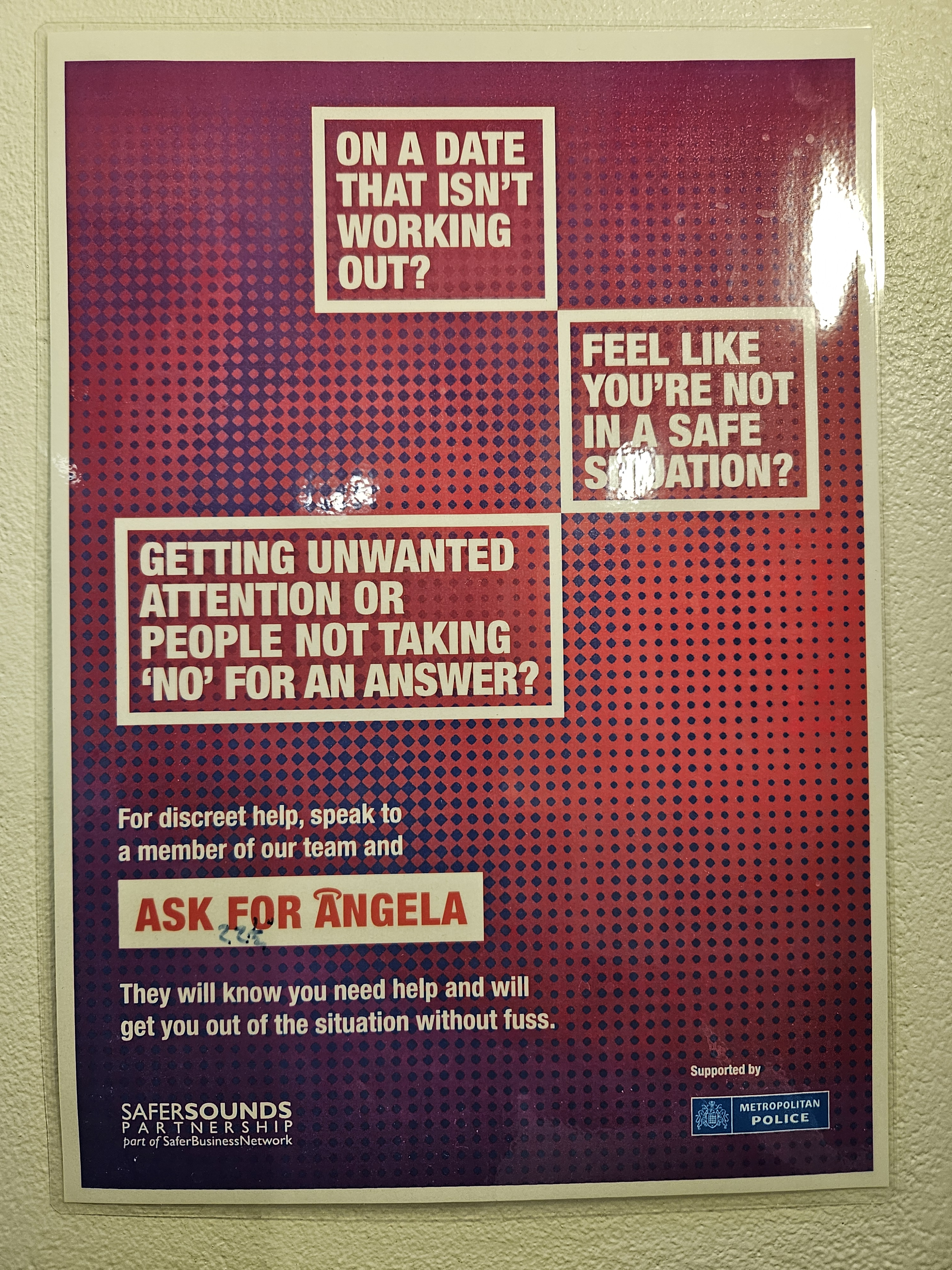
Poster of Ask for Angela

Ask for Angela is a campaign in England that started in 2016 by Hayley Crawford The campaign spawned the "angel shot" code word, a fake drink patrons can order to show that they need help.

== Campaign ==
Posters are placed around the establishments where the campaign is being implemented. There are many different poster designs.

The programme is not gender specific and aims to help all people, so posters are placed in all area in the establishment, with the back of toilet doors being a popular placement. Staff at the bars and pubs that participate in the campaign have been trained to know what to do if someone asks for Angela.

== History ==
The programme was started in Lincolnshire, England, by Hayley Crawford, the Substance Misuse and Sexual violence (prevention) strategic Coordinator for Lincolnshire County Council. Crawford started the campaign as a part of a much larger campaign, #NoMore, to decrease sexual violence and abuse in Lincolnshire. The "Ask for Angela" campaign is named in remembrance of Angela Phillips (her family do not wish Angela to be remembered by her married name Crompton), a woman who was abused and killed by her husband in 2012 when an argument about redecorating his house got out of control. The campaign name, "Angela", was also inspired by the meaning of the name which is "messenger of God" or "angel".

Ask for Angela gained many approvals, and sparked a campaign in the United States where they adopted the same idea but changed the codeword. In this campaign, people can ask for an "Angel Shot" and have it be "neat" (escort to car), "on the rocks" (call a taxi), or "with a lime" (call the police). Depending on the codeword after "Angel Shot", the bartenders will react accordingly because ordering the shot alerts the staff that they feel unsafe and uncomfortable.

In November 2025, Crawford announced her intention to set up a charity called Ask for Angela in the United Kingdom.

In June 2026, Crawford was announced in the King's Birthday Honours list as receiving a King's Police Medal for her work in creating Ask for Angela. In September 2026, Crawford won the award for 'Contribution to Industry' at the Women in Security Awards.

Hayley Crawford the schemes creator announced Ask for Angela Foundation is now a registered charity Sydney in New South Wales, Australia implemented the scheme in over 1,000 bars in 2018 supported by Hayley Crawford. In Australia specifically, the implementation of Ask for Angela has led to a broader campaign system that allows individuals to express feelings of vulnerability to others. This structured form of communication inside a bar environment allowed both victims and officials to better identify situations of domestic or date violence. New South Wales Police presented Crawford with a plaque of the city's appreciation for her commitment to public safety.

In Argentina, Ask for Angela was implemented in February 2023, following their entry into the International Nightlife Association (INA), which has been providing guidelines on safety and sexual assault since 2017. The President of the Argentina Nightlife Federation (FEDRA) announced this new development, stating that they would be placing the protocol in various nightlife venues along with implementing safety and quality nightlife measures around Argentina.

== Criticisms ==
The "Ask for Angela" campaign has received significant criticism primarily due to its perceived focus on reactive, rather than proactive, measures. Critics of the campaign believe the efforts placed into "Ask for Angela" should be redirected to discouraging this unacceptable behavior initially. This statement was echoed by individuals, such as Geri Burnikell, a co-ordinator for SupportLine, who advocates for stronger sentences for those who commit crimes of a sexual nature.

While the method intends to prioritise the discretion of those seeking assistance, the growing popularity of "Ask for Angela" may render it a hazard, rather than a safety precaution. In certain settings, signaling discomfort can possibly alert predators to a potential target, thereby intensifying the danger to those in vulnerable situations.

Another flaw within the campaign would be the non-compulsory aspect. Reportedly, many bars and restaurants throughout London have omitted "Ask for Angela" in employee training. When asked regarding the initiative, one restaurant owner in London reported that a high staff turnover rate has created confusion and misunderstanding, and the expenses of the programme were simply too high to justify keeping it.

In November 2024, BBC News published the results of an undercover investigation which had researchers pose as a couple on a date in different venues around London which claimed to be participating in the "Ask for Angela" scheme. In 13 of the 25 venues visited, staff did not respond appropriately to the codeword when approached by the apparently distressed female researcher.
