= Old Moat =

Coordinates: 53.4358°N 2.2350°W

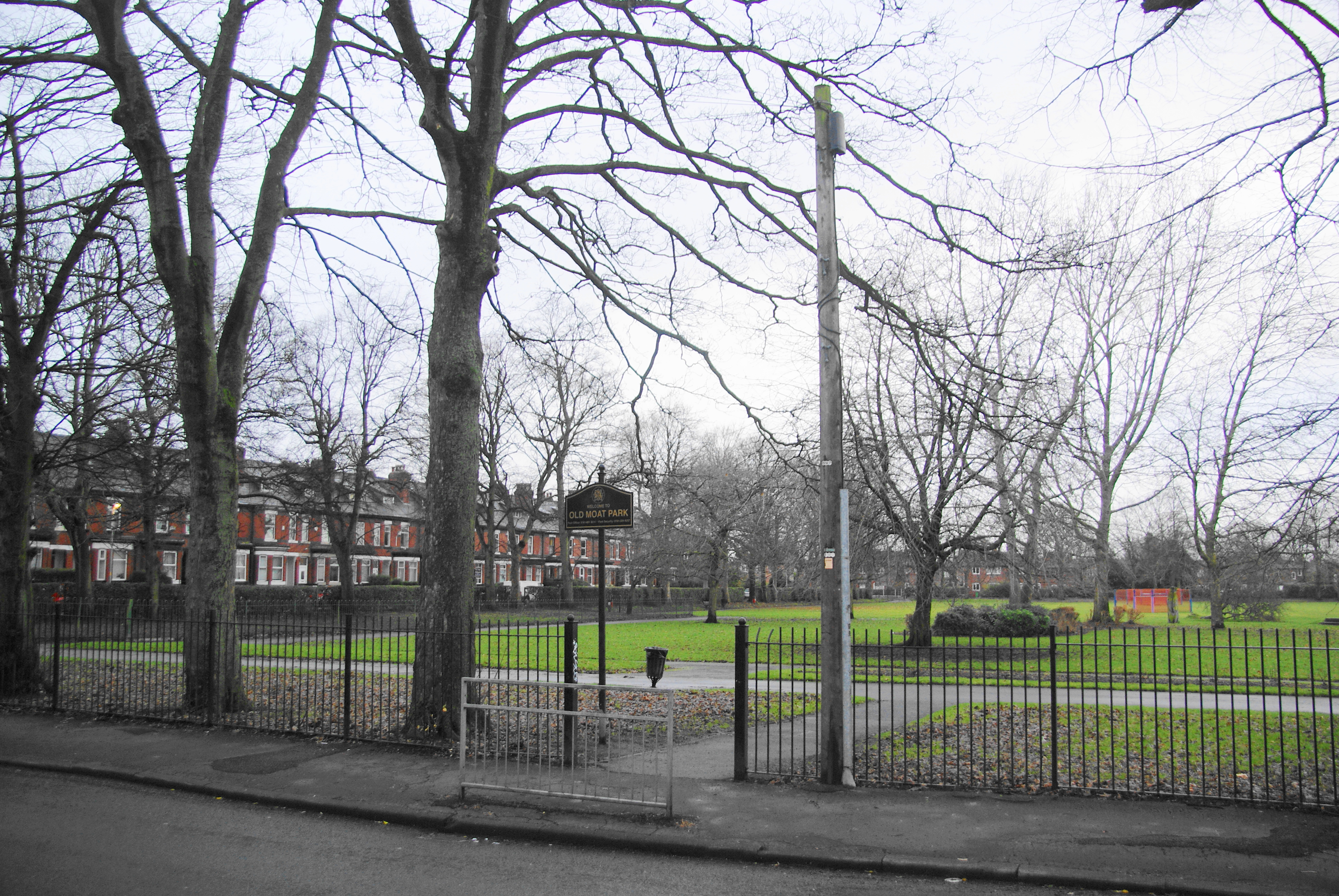
- Old Moat Park

- Location within Greater Manchester
- Population: 14,490 (Census 2011)
- OS grid reference: SJ844932
- Metropolitan borough: Manchester
- Metropolitan county: Greater Manchester
- Region: North West
- Country: England
- Sovereign state: United Kingdom
- Post town: MANCHESTER
- Postcode district: M20
- Dialling code: 0161
- Police: Greater Manchester
- Fire: Greater Manchester
- Ambulance: North West
- UK Parliament: Manchester Withington

Old Moat is a suburban area of Manchester, England. The population of its electoral ward at the 2011 census was 14,490.

== History ==
=== Old Moat estate ===
The "Old Moat estate" is a large estate of 1920s built social housing named after a former manor house with a surrounding moat, which was the seat of the lord of the manor, and was situated in what is now the heart of the estate. The site of the manor house is marked by a plaque on number 22 Eddisbury Avenue. The housing is now mostly owned by Southway Housing Trust.

== Governance ==
The area is represented in Westminster by Jeff Smith MP for Manchester Withington.

Voters from this ward elect three councillors to Manchester City Council. Currently, these are Gavin White Garry Bridges (Labour Party) and Sam Easterby-Smith (Green Party). The Labour Party held all the seats in the ward from 1986 until 2026.

== Geography ==
It is bounded by Wilmslow Road to the East and Princess Road to the West. The Northern boundary bisects several roads just below Wilbraham Road, whilst in the South it follows a path just above Cavendish Road.

== Education and policing ==
=== Primary schools ===
The area is served by Old Moat Primary School, on Old Moat Lane.

=== Policing ===
Old Moat is covered by the South Manchester Division of Greater Manchester Police. The local Neighbourhood Policing Team is the Didsbury Neighbourhood Policing Team, which covers Didsbury, Old Moat, Withington and Burnage and is headed up by Inspector Dave Nutsey. Didsbury Police Station is situated in the heart of Didsbury village on Wilmslow Road.

== Notable events ==
In November 2023, a fox carving was stolen from Old Moat Park. The specially-carved animal is one of two in Old Moat Park in Withington which was paid for out of the Friends of Old Moat Park funding for improvements. The crime remains unsolved.
