= Lightbowne (ward) =

- Ward
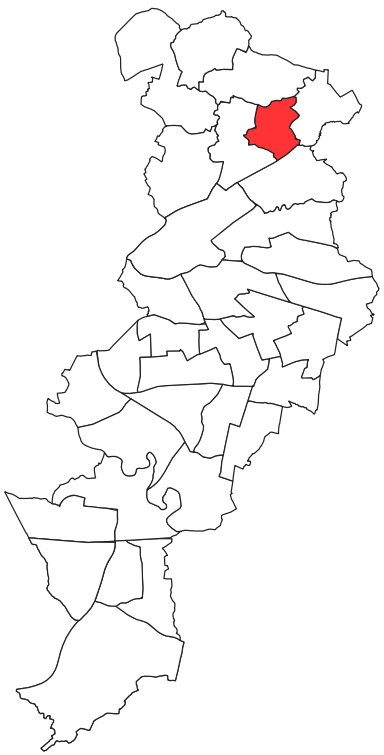
- Lightbowne ward (1994) within Manchester

- Coat of arms
- Country: United Kingdom
- Constituent country: England
- Region: North West England
- County: Greater Manchester
- Metropolitan borough: Manchester
- Created: May 1950
- Named for: Lightbowne Road, Moston

Government
  - Type: Unicameral
  - Body: Manchester City Council
- UK Parliamentary Constituency: Manchester Blackley

Lightbowne was an electoral division of Manchester City Council which was represented from 1950 until 2004. It covered part of Moston in North Manchester.

== Overview ==
Lightbowne ward was created in 1950, covering the southern portions of the Blackley and Moston wards. In 1971, the ward incorporated that part of the Blackley ward to the south of the Boggart Hole Brook. Further city-wide boundary revision in 1982, transferred the westernmost portion of the Moston ward to Lightbowne. In 2004, the ward was abolished, and its remaining area was divided between the Harpurhey and Moston wards.

For the entirety of its existence, the ward formed part of the Manchester Blackley Parliamentary constituency.

== Councillors ==
Election	Councillor	Councillor	Councillor
1950	M. Tylecote (Lab)	W. Onions (Lab)	R. Malcolm (Lab)
1951	J. H. Ferrington (Con)	W. Onions (Lab)	R. Malcolm (Lab)
1952	J. H. Ferrington (Con)	W. Onions (Lab)	R. Malcolm (Lab)
September 1952	J. H. Ferrington (Con)	H. Pigott (Con)	R. Malcolm (Lab)
1953	J. H. Ferrington (Con)	H. Pigott (Con)	R. Malcolm (Lab)
1954	D. Pigott (Con)	H. Pigott (Con)	R. Malcolm (Lab)
1955	D. Pigott (Con)	H. Pigott (Con)	J. Chatterton (Con)
1956	D. Pigott (Con)	H. Pigott (Con)	J. Chatterton (Con)
1957	G. Halstead (Lab)	H. Pigott (Con)	J. Chatterton (Con)
1958	G. Halstead (Lab)	H. Pigott (Con)	K. Franklin (Lab)
1959	G. Halstead (Lab)	H. Pigott (Con)	K. Franklin (Lab)
1960	A. Tetlow (Con)	H. Pigott (Con)	K. Franklin (Lab)
1961	A. Tetlow (Con)	H. Pigott (Con)	K. Franklin (Lab)
1962	A. Tetlow (Con)	H. Pigott (Con)	K. Franklin (Lab)
1963	L. Kelly (Lab)	H. Pigott (Con)	K. Franklin (Lab)
1964	L. Kelly (Lab)	H. Pigott (Con)	K. Franklin (Lab)
1965	L. Kelly (Lab)	H. Pigott (Con)	K. Franklin (Lab)
1966	L. Kelly (Lab)	H. Pigott (Con)	K. Franklin (Lab)
1967	L. Kelly (Lab)	H. Pigott (Con)	N. A. Green (Con)
1968	L. Kelly (Lab)	H. Pigott (Con)	N. A. Green (Con)
September 1968	L. Kelly (Lab)	J. Jackson (Con)	N. A. Green (Con)
1969	F. Taylor (Con)	J. Jackson (Con)	N. A. Green (Con)
1970	F. Taylor (Con)	J. Jackson (Con)	N. A. Green (Con)
1971	H. T. Lee (Lab)	S. Smith (Lab)	R. A. Reddington (Lab)
1972	H. T. Lee (Lab)	S. Smith (Lab)	R. A. Reddington (Lab)
1973	H. T. Lee (Lab)	R. A. Reddington (Lab)	E. Jones (Con)
1975	H. T. Lee (Lab)	R. A. Reddington (Lab)	E. Jones (Con)
1976	H. T. Lee (Lab)	G. Cleworth (Con)	E. Jones (Con)
1978	H. T. Lee (Lab)	G. Cleworth (Con)	E. Jones (Con)
1979	H. T. Lee (Lab)	G. Cleworth (Con)	P. A. Murphy (Lab)
1980	H. T. Lee (Lab)	A. D. Kelly (Lab)	P. A. Murphy (Lab)
1982	P. A. Murphy (Lab)	A. D. Kelly (Lab)	D. Shaw (Lab)
1983	P. A. Murphy (Lab)	A. D. Kelly (Lab)	D. Shaw (Lab)
1984	P. A. Murphy (Lab)	A. D. Kelly (Lab)	D. Shaw (Lab)
1986	K. Franklin (Lab)	A. D. Kelly (Lab)	D. Shaw (Lab)
1987	K. Franklin (Lab)	A. D. Kelly (Lab)	G. Carey (Con)
1988	K. Franklin (Lab)	W. Risby (Lab)	G. Carey (Con)
June 1988	K. Franklin (Lab)	W. Risby (Lab)	G. Carey (Ind. Con)
1990	K. Franklin (Lab)	W. Risby (Lab)	G. Carey (Ind. Con)
September 1990	K. Franklin (Lab)	W. Risby (Lab)	C. M. Inchbold (Lab)
1991	K. Franklin (Lab)	W. Risby (Lab)	C. M. Inchbold (Lab)
1992	K. Franklin (Lab)	W. Risby (Lab)	C. M. Inchbold (Lab)
1994	K. Franklin (Lab)	W. Risby (Lab)	C. M. Inchbold (Lab)
1995	K. Franklin (Lab)	W. Risby (Lab)	C. M. Inchbold (Lab)
1996	K. Franklin (Lab)	W. Risby (Lab)	C. M. Inchbold (Lab)
1998	K. Franklin (Lab)	W. Risby (Lab)	C. M. Inchbold (Lab)
1999	K. Franklin (Lab)	W. Risby (Lab)	P. A. Murphy (Lab)
2000	K. Franklin (Lab)	W. Risby (Lab)	P. A. Murphy (Lab)
2002	K. Franklin (Lab)	W. Risby (Lab)	P. A. Murphy (Lab)
2003	K. Franklin (Lab)	W. Risby (Lab)	P. A. Murphy (Lab)

== Elections ==
=== Elections in 1950s ===
==== May 1950 ====
1950
Party	Candidate	Votes	%	±%
Labour	W. Onions*	4,294		
Conservative	J. H. Ferrington			
Communist	E. C. Dalton			
Majority				
Turnout				
Labour hold		Swing		

==== May 1951 ====
1951
Party	Candidate	Votes	%	±%
Conservative	J. H. Ferrington	4,539	53.1	
Labour	M. Tylecote*	3,098	36.3	
Liberal	C. N. Higginson	903	10.6	
Majority		1,441	16.8	
Turnout		8,540		
Conservative gain from Labour		Swing		

==== May 1952 ====
1952
Party	Candidate	Votes	%	±%
Labour	R. Malcolm*	4,600	46.9	+10.6
Conservative	H. Piggott	4,544	46.3	−6.8
Liberal	C. N. Higginson	666	6.8	−3.8
Majority		56	0.6	
Turnout		9,810		
Labour hold		Swing		

==== September 1952 (by-election) ====
By-election: 25 September 1952
Party	Candidate	Votes	%	±%
Conservative	H. Piggott	4,180	51.8	+5.5
Labour	J. Clough	3,565	44.2	−2.7
Liberal	R. Frere	319	4.0	−2.8
Majority		615	7.6	
Turnout		8,064		
Conservative gain from Labour		Swing		

==== May 1953 ====
1953
Party	Candidate	Votes	%	±%
Conservative	H. Piggott*	4,742	56.1	+9.8
Labour	G. Halstead	3,709	43.9	−3.0
Majority		1,033	12.2	+11.6
Turnout		8,451		
Conservative hold		Swing		

==== May 1954 ====
1954
Party	Candidate	Votes	%	±%
Conservative	D. Piggott*	3,840	48.4	−7.7
Labour	G. Halstead	3,508	44.2	+0.3
Liberal	F. N. Wedlock	583	7.4	N/A
Majority		332	4.2	−8.0
Turnout		7,931		
Conservative hold		Swing		

==== May 1955 ====
1955
Party	Candidate	Votes	%	±%
Conservative	J. Chatterton	3,665	49.8	+1.4
Labour	R. Malcolm*	3,080	41.8	−2.4
Liberal	F. N. Wedlock	619	8.4	+1.0
Majority		585	8.0	+3.8
Turnout		7,364		
Conservative gain from Labour		Swing		

==== May 1956 ====
1956
Party	Candidate	Votes	%	±%
Conservative	H. Piggott*	3,268	50.4	+0.6
Labour	G. Halstead	2,536	39.1	−2.7
Liberal	F. N. Wedlock	683	10.5	+2.1
Majority		732	11.3	+3.3
Turnout		6,487		
Conservative hold		Swing		

==== May 1957 ====
1957
Party	Candidate	Votes	%	±%
Labour	G. Halstead	2,889	43.0	+3.9
Conservative	D. Piggott*	2,852	42.5	−7.9
Liberal	F. N. Wedlock	973	14.5	+4.0
Majority		37	0.5	
Turnout		6,714		
Labour gain from Conservative		Swing		

==== May 1958 ====
1958
Party	Candidate	Votes	%	±%
Labour	K. Franklin	3,305	46.7	+3.7
Conservative	J. Chatterton*	2,210	31.2	−11.3
Liberal	F. N. Wedlock	1,563	22.1	+7.6
Majority		1,095	15.5	+15.0
Turnout		7,078		
Labour gain from Conservative		Swing		

==== May 1959 ====
1959
Party	Candidate	Votes	%	±%
Conservative	H. Piggott*	3,399	46.9	+15.7
Labour	L. Kelly	2,688	37.1	−9.6
Liberal	F. N. Wedlock	1,153	16.0	−6.1
Majority		711	9.8	−5.7
Turnout		7,240		
Conservative hold		Swing		

=== Elections in 1960s ===
==== May 1960 ====
1960
Party	Candidate	Votes	%	±%
Conservative	A. Tetlow	2,766	47.0	+0.1
Labour	G. Halstead*	2,122	36.0	−1.1
Liberal	E. Platt	1,001	17.0	+1.0
Majority		644	11.0	+1.2
Turnout		5,889		
Conservative gain from Labour		Swing		

==== May 1961 ====
1961
Party	Candidate	Votes	%	±%
Labour	K. Franklin*	2,859	41.5	+5.5
Conservative	J. S. Cumpstay	2,718	39.4	−7.6
Liberal	E. Platt	1,320	19.1	+2.1
Majority		141	2.1	
Turnout		6,897		
Labour hold		Swing		

==== May 1962 ====
1962
Party	Candidate	Votes	%	±%
Conservative	H. Pigott*	2,633	38.6	−0.6
Labour	G. Halstead	2,394	35.1	−6.4
Liberal	E. Platt	1,551	22.7	+3.6
Ratepayers	E. Alderton	247	3.6	N/A
Majority		239	3.5	
Turnout		6,825		
Conservative hold		Swing		

==== May 1963 ====
1963
Party	Candidate	Votes	%	±%
Labour	L. Kelly	2,648	42.5	+7.4
Conservative	A. Tetlow*	2,070	33.3	−5.3
Liberal	H. Roche	1,507	24.2	+1.5
Majority		578	9.2	
Turnout		6,225		
Labour gain from Conservative		Swing		

==== May 1964 ====
1964
Party	Candidate	Votes	%	±%
Labour	K. Franklin*	2,700	46.1	+3.6
Conservative	A. Tetlow	2,080	35.5	+2.2
Liberal	H. Roche	1,080	18.4	−5.8
Majority		620	10.6	+1.4
Turnout		5,860		
Labour hold		Swing		

==== May 1965 ====
1965
Party	Candidate	Votes	%	±%
Conservative	H. Pigott*	2,654	45.7	+10.2
Labour	P. T. Taylor	1,819	31.3	−14.8
Liberal	H. Roche	1,220	21.0	+2.6
Communist	L. Cole	118	2.0	N/A
Majority		835	14.4	
Turnout		5,811		
Conservative hold		Swing		

==== May 1966 ====
1966
Party	Candidate	Votes	%	±%
Labour	L. Kelly*	2,012	41.8	+10.5
Conservative	A. Tetlow	1,935	40.2	−5.5
Liberal	H. Roche	815	17.0	−4.0
Communist	F. J. Keeney	48	1.0	−1.0
Majority		77	1.6	
Turnout		4,810		
Labour hold		Swing		

==== May 1967 ====
1967
Party	Candidate	Votes	%	±%
Conservative	N. A. Green	2,396	46.5	+6.3
Labour	K. Franklin*	1,846	35.8	−6.0
Liberal	H. Roche	848	16.4	−0.6
Communist	F. J. Keeney	66	1.3	+0.3
Majority		550	10.7	
Turnout		5,156		
Conservative gain from Labour		Swing		

==== May 1968 ====
1968
Party	Candidate	Votes	%	±%
Conservative	H. Pigott*	2,946	61.9	+15.4
Labour	K. Franklin	1,703	35.7	−0.1
Communist	R. Cole	114	2.4	+1.1
Majority		1,243	26.2	+15.5
Turnout		4,763		
Conservative hold		Swing		

==== September 1968 (by-election) ====
By-election: 26 September 1968
Party	Candidate	Votes	%	±%
Conservative	J. Jackson	1,716	49.2	−12.7
Labour	K. Franklin	1,707	48.9	+13.2
Communist	R. Cole	65	1.9	−0.5
Majority		9	0.3	−25.9
Turnout		3,488		
Conservative hold		Swing		

==== May 1969 ====
1969
Party	Candidate	Votes	%	±%
Conservative	F. Taylor	2,318	46.1	−15.8
Labour	L. Kelly*	1,535	30.5	−5.2
Liberal	H. Roche	1,097	21.8	N/A
Communist	R. Cole	83	1.6	−0.8
Majority		783	15.6	−10.6
Turnout		5,033		
Conservative gain from Labour		Swing		

=== Elections in 1970s ===
==== May 1970 ====
1970
Party	Candidate	Votes	%	±%
Conservative	N. A. Green*	2,116	43.9	−2.2
Labour	W. Lister	2,013	41.8	+11.3
Liberal	G. H. Wilkinson	665	13.8	−8.0
Residents	T. Tennyson-Smith	23	0.5	N/A
Majority		103	2.1	−13.5
Turnout		4,817		
Conservative hold		Swing		

==== May 1971 ====
1971 (3 vacancies; new boundaries)
Party	Candidate	Votes	%	±%
Labour	H. T. Lee	3,383	57.8	
Labour	S. Smith	3,302	56.4	
Labour	R. A. Reddington	3,297	56.3	
Conservative	J. Jackson*	1,830	31.3	
Conservative	N. A. Green*	1,819	31.1	
Conservative	E. Jones	1,770	30.3	
Liberal	H. Roche	843	14.4	
Liberal	R. Jackson	713	12.2	
Liberal	G. H. Wilkinson	597	11.9	
Majority		1,467	25.1	
Turnout		5,851		
Labour win (new seat)				
Labour win (new seat)				
Labour win (new seat)				

==== May 1972 ====
1972
Party	Candidate	Votes	%	±%
Labour	R. A. Reddington*	1,877	38.8	−19.0
Conservative	N. A. Green	1,868	38.6	+7.3
Liberal	J. Lindsay	1,098	22.6	+8.2
Majority		9	0.2	−24.9
Turnout		4,843		
Labour hold		Swing		

==== May 1973 ====
1973 (3 vacancies; reorganisation)
Party	Candidate	Votes	%	±%
Labour	H. T. Lee*	1,618	36.9	−1.9
Labour	R. A. Reddington*	1,570	35.8	−3.0
Conservative	E. Jones	1,569	35.8	−2.8
Conservative	E. D. Kirkup	1,558	35.5	−3.1
Labour	S. Smith*	1,547	35.3	−3.5
Conservative	D. Porter	1,511	34.5	−4.1
Independent Liberal	I. Lindsay	865	19.7	N/A
Liberal	R. Jackson	765	17.4	−5.2
Liberal	I. Garrard	655	14.9	−7.7
Liberal	G. Garrard	627	14.3	−8.3
Majority		12	0.3	
Turnout		4,385		
Labour hold		Swing		
Labour hold		Swing		
Conservative gain from Labour		Swing		

==== May 1975 ====
1975
Party	Candidate	Votes	%	±%
Conservative	E. Jones*	1,546	38.4	+5.8
Labour	F. Done	1,358	33.7	+0.1
Liberal	H. Roche	1,122	27.9	+12.0
Majority		188	4.7	+3.6
Turnout		4,026		
Conservative hold		Swing	+2.8	

==== May 1976 ====
1976
Party	Candidate	Votes	%	±%
Conservative	G. Cleworth	2,308	52.7	+14.3
Labour	R. A. Reddington*	2,068	47.3	+13.6
Majority		240	5.5	+0.8
Turnout		4,376		
Conservative gain from Labour		Swing	+0.3	

==== May 1978 ====
1978
Party	Candidate	Votes	%	±%
Labour	H. T. Lee*	2,560	55.5	+8.2
Conservative	N. McHardy	2,051	44.5	−8.2
Majority		509	11.0	+5.5
Turnout		4,611	43.0	
Labour hold		Swing	+8.2	

==== May 1979 ====
1979
Party	Candidate	Votes	%	±%
Labour	P. A. Murphy	4,358	55.2	−0.3
Conservative	V. E. Clare	2,787	35.3	−9.2
Liberal	K. Osbourne	743	9.4	+9.4
Majority		1,571	19.9	+8.9
Turnout		7,888	74.8	+31.8
Labour gain from Conservative		Swing	+4.4	

=== Elections in 1980s ===
==== May 1980 ====
1980
Party	Candidate	Votes	%	±%
Labour	A. D. Kelly	2,632	61.0	+5.8
Conservative	G. Cleworth*	1,459	33.8	−1.5
Liberal	B. V. Roberts	224	5.2	−4.2
Majority		1,173	27.2	+7.3
Turnout		4,315	41.3	−33.5
Labour gain from Conservative		Swing	+3.6	

==== May 1982 ====
1982 (3 vacancies; new boundaries)
Party	Candidate	Votes	%	±%
Labour	Paul Murphy*	2,145	44.4	
Labour	Alison Kelly*	1,952	40.4	
Labour	Derek Shaw	1,950	40.4	
Conservative	Albert Bolland	1,340	27.7	
Conservative	Vincent Clare	1,333	27.6	
Conservative	Grace Cleworth	1,315	27.2	
Liberal	Frederick Pinder	1,184	24.5	
Liberal	James Ashley	1,168	24.2	
Liberal	Elizabeth Thompson	1,043	21.6	
Independent	George Croston	147	3.0	
Majority		610	12.7	
Turnout		4,831	47.6	
Labour win (new seat)				
Labour win (new seat)				
Labour win (new seat)				

==== May 1983 ====
1983
Party	Candidate	Votes	%	±%
Labour	Derek Shaw*	2,543	53.3	+8.7
Conservative	Albert Bolland	1,678	35.2	+7.3
Liberal	John Cookson	551	11.5	−13.0
Majority		865	18.1	+1.4
Turnout		4,772		
Labour hold		Swing	+0.7	

==== May 1984 ====
1984
Party	Candidate	Votes	%	±%
Labour	Alison Kelly*	2,576	56.0	+2.7
Conservative	Gwendoline Hurley	1,556	33.8	−1.4
Liberal	John Cookson	471	10.2	−1.3
Majority		1,020	22.2	+4.1
Turnout		4,603		
Labour hold		Swing	+2.0	

==== May 1986 ====
1986
Party	Candidate	Votes	%	±%
Labour	K. Franklin	2,842	63.1	+7.1
Conservative	J. Bailey	1,040	23.1	−10.7
Liberal	D. Porter	620	13.8	+3.6
Majority		1,802	40.0	+17.8
Turnout		4,502		
Labour hold		Swing	+8.9	

==== May 1987 ====
1987
Party	Candidate	Votes	%	±%
Conservative	Gerry Carey	2,035	38.6	+15.5
Labour	Derek Shaw*	1,855	35.2	−27.9
Liberal	David Porter	1,385	26.3	+12.5
Majority		180	3.4	−36.6
Turnout		5,275		
Conservative gain from Labour		Swing	+21.7	

==== May 1988 ====
1988
Party	Candidate	Votes	%	±%
Labour	W. Risby	2,497	50.8	+15.6
Conservative	J. A. Smeaton	1,882	38.3	−0.3
SLD	D. Porter	464	9.4	−16.9
Green	R. Wallace	72	1.5	+1.5
Majority		615	12.5	+9.1
Turnout		4,915		
Labour hold		Swing	+7.9	

=== Elections in 1990s ===
==== May 1990 ====
1990
Party	Candidate	Votes	%	±%
Labour	K. Franklin*	2,927	65.4	+14.6
Conservative	A. G. Edwardson	832	18.6	−19.7
Liberal Democrats	D. Porter	489	10.9	+1.5
Green	G. F. Carter	226	5.1	+3.6
Majority		2,095	46.8	+34.3
Turnout		4,474		
Labour hold		Swing	+17.1	

==== September 1990 (by-election) ====
By-election: 27 September 1990
Party	Candidate	Votes	%	±%
Labour	C. M. Inchbold	1,532	55.7	−9.7
Conservative	D. Shaw	874	31.8	+13.2
Green	G. F. Carter	174	6.3	+1.2
Liberal Democrats	C. Turner	170	6.2	−4.7
Majority		658	23.9	−22.9
Turnout		2,750		
Labour gain from Ind. Conservative		Swing		

==== May 1991 ====
1991
Party	Candidate	Votes	%	±%
Labour	C. M. Inchbold*	2,081	54.3	−11.1
Conservative	M. P. Steadman	1,054	27.5	+8.9
Liberal Democrats	P. G. Matthews	700	18.3	+7.4
Majority		1,027	26.8	−20.0
Turnout		3,835	39.9	
Labour hold		Swing	-10.0	

==== May 1992 ====
1992
Party	Candidate	Votes	%	±%
Labour	W. Risby*	1,709	58.4	+4.1
Conservative	M. Steadman	929	31.7	+4.2
Liberal Democrats	P. Matthews	288	9.8	−8.5
Majority		780	26.7	−0.1
Turnout		2,926		
Labour hold		Swing	-0.0	

==== May 1994 ====
1994
Party	Candidate	Votes	%	±%
Labour	K. Franklin*	2,395	75.2	+16.8
Conservative	M. Steadman	413	13.0	−18.7
Liberal Democrats	D. Gordon	376	11.8	+2.0
Majority		1,982	62.2	+35.5
Turnout		3,184		
Labour hold		Swing	+17.7	

==== May 1995 ====
1995
Party	Candidate	Votes	%	±%
Labour	Cath Inchbold*	1,853	73.8	−1.4
Conservative	Henry Coombes	344	13.7	+0.7
Liberal Democrats	David Gordon	242	9.6	−2.2
Green	A. Salter	73	2.9	+2.9
Majority		1,509	60.1	−2.1
Turnout		2,512		
Labour hold		Swing	-1.0	

==== May 1996 ====
1996
Party	Candidate	Votes	%	±%
Labour	William Risby*	1,757	75.8	+2.0
Conservative	M. Steadman	315	13.6	−0.1
Liberal Democrats	David Gordon	186	8.0	−1.6
Green	Philip Maile	60	2.6	−0.3
Majority		1,442	62.2	+2.1
Turnout		2,318		
Labour hold		Swing	+1.0	

==== May 1998 ====
1998
Party	Candidate	Votes	%	±%
Labour	Kenneth Franklin*	1,277	71.7	−4.1
Conservative	William Clapham	258	14.5	+0.9
Liberal Democrats	Samantha McCormick	247	13.9	+5.9
Majority		1,019	57.2	−5.0
Turnout		1,782		
Labour hold		Swing	-2.5	

==== May 1999 ====
1999
Party	Candidate	Votes	%	±%
Labour	Paul Murphy	1,231	71.7	−0.0
Conservative	Teresa Skorzewski	270	15.7	+1.2
Liberal Democrats	Elsie Slater	217	12.6	−1.3
Majority		961	55.9	−1.3
Turnout		1,718	20.1	
Labour hold		Swing	-0.6	

=== Elections in 2000s ===
==== May 2000 ====
2000
Party	Candidate	Votes	%	±%
Labour	William Risby*	987	64.6	−7.1
Liberal Democrats	David Gordon	428	28.0	+15.4
Green	Simon Chislett	114	7.5	+7.5
Majority		559	36.6	−19.3
Turnout		1,529	19.2	−0.9
Labour hold		Swing	-11.2	

==== May 2002 ====
2002
Party	Candidate	Votes	%	±%
Labour	Kenneth Franklin*	1,365	71.4	+6.8
Conservative	Howard Varney	261	13.6	+13.6
Liberal Democrats	Kevin Morley	258	13.5	−14.5
Green	Matthew Payne	29	1.5	−6.0
Majority		1,104	57.7	+21.1
Turnout		1,913	23.0	+3.8
Labour hold		Swing	-3.4	

==== May 2003 ====
2003
Party	Candidate	Votes	%	±%
Labour	Paul Murphy*	1,177	70.5	−0.9
Liberal Democrats	Stephen Allen	213	12.8	−0.7
Conservative	Howard Varney	198	11.9	−1.7
Green	Matthew Payne	82	4.9	+3.4
Majority		964	57.7	+0.0
Turnout		1,670	20.0	−3.0
Labour hold		Swing	-0.1	

== See also ==
- Manchester City Council
- Manchester City Council elections
