= Hugh Oldham (ward) =

- Ward
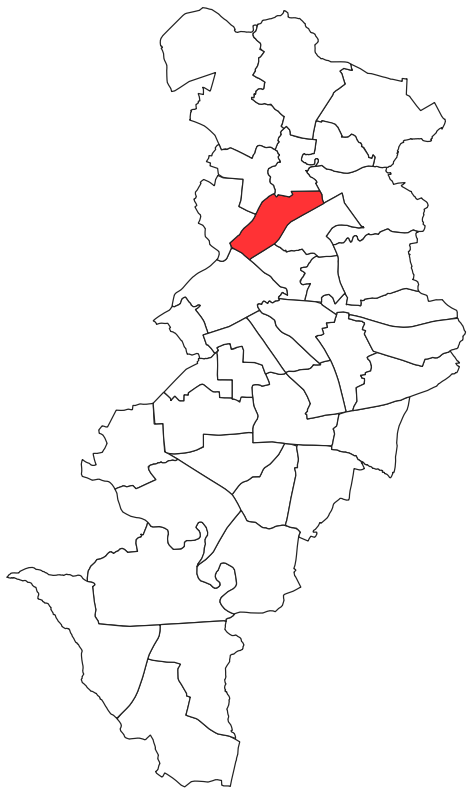
- Hugh Oldham ward (1954) within Manchester

- Coat of arms
- Country: United Kingdom
- Constituent country: England
- Region: North West England
- County borough: Manchester
- Created: May 1950
- Named for: Hugh Oldham

Government
  - Type: Unicameral
  - Body: Manchester City Council
- UK Parliamentary Constituency: Manchester Cheetham

Hugh Oldham, formerly Newtown, was an electoral division of Manchester City Council which was represented from 1950 until 1971. It covered Collyhurst and Monsall to the north of Manchester city centre.

== Overview ==
Newtown ward was created in 1950, from the area of the former Collyhurst and St. Michael's wards. In 1954, its name was changed to Hugh Oldham but its boundaries remained the same. In 1971, the ward was abolished, and its area became part of the Collegiate Church and Miles Platting wards.

For the entirety of its existence, the ward formed part of the Manchester Cheetham Parliamentary constituency.

== Councillors ==
Election	Councillor	Councillor	Councillor
1950	M. J. Griffin (Lab)	W. Collingson (Lab)	A. Donovan (Lab)
1951	M. J. Griffin (Lab)	W. Collingson (Lab)	A. Donovan (Lab)
1952	M. J. Griffin (Lab)	W. Collingson (Lab)	A. Donovan (Lab)
1953	M. J. Griffin (Lab)	J. B. Ogden (Lab)	A. Donovan (Lab)
1954	S. Humphries (Lab)	J. B. Ogden (Lab)	A. Donovan (Lab)
1955	S. Humphries (Lab)	J. B. Ogden (Lab)	A. Donovan (Lab)
1956	S. Humphries (Lab)	J. B. Ogden (Lab)	A. Donovan (Lab)
1957	S. Humphries (Lab)	J. B. Ogden (Lab)	A. Donovan (Lab)
1958	S. Humphries (Lab)	J. B. Ogden (Lab)	H. Langan (Lab)
1959	S. Humphries (Lab)	J. B. Ogden (Lab)	H. Langan (Lab)
1960	S. Humphries (Lab)	J. B. Ogden (Lab)	H. Langan (Lab)
1961	S. Humphries (Lab)	J. B. Ogden (Lab)	H. Langan (Lab)
1962	S. Humphries (Lab)	J. B. Ogden (Lab)	H. Langan (Lab)
March 1963	S. Humphries (Lab)	J. B. Ogden (Lab)	A. Nicholson (Lab)
1963	S. Humphries (Lab)	J. B. Ogden (Lab)	A. Nicholson (Lab)
1964	S. Humphries (Lab)	J. B. Ogden (Lab)	A. Nicholson (Lab)
1965	S. Humphries (Lab)	J. B. Ogden (Lab)	A. Nicholson (Lab)
1966	S. Humphries (Lab)	J. B. Ogden (Lab)	A. Nicholson (Lab)
1967	S. Humphries (Lab)	J. B. Ogden (Lab)	A. Nicholson (Lab)
March 1968	S. V. Shaw (Lab)	J. B. Ogden (Lab)	A. Nicholson (Lab)
1968	S. V. Shaw (Lab)	J. B. Ogden (Lab)	A. Nicholson (Lab)
1969	S. V. Shaw (Lab)	J. B. Ogden (Lab)	A. Nicholson (Lab)
1970	S. V. Shaw (Lab)	J. B. Ogden (Lab)	A. Nicholson (Lab)

== Elections ==
=== Elections in 1950s ===
==== May 1950 ====
1950
Party	Candidate	Votes	%	±%
Labour	W. Collingson*	3,489	69.0	
Conservative	W. B. Kinsey	1,567	31.0	
Majority		1,922	38.0	
Turnout		5,056		
Labour hold		Swing		

==== May 1951 ====
1951
Party	Candidate	Votes	%	±%
Labour	M. J. Griffin*	2,666	62.0	−7.0
Conservative	W. B. Kinsey	1,631	38.0	+7.0
Majority		1,035	24.0	−14.0
Turnout		4,297		
Labour hold		Swing		

==== May 1952 ====
1952
Party	Candidate	Votes	%	±%
Labour	A. Donovan*	4,366	81.7	+19.7
Conservative	J. J. Doyle	976	18.3	−19.7
Majority		3,390	63.4	+39.4
Turnout		5,342		
Labour hold		Swing		

==== May 1953 ====
1953
Party	Candidate	Votes	%	±%
Labour	J. B. Ogden*	3,091	77.0	−4.7
Conservative	A. Gregory	925	23.0	+4.7
Majority		2,166	54.0	−9.4
Turnout		4,016		
Labour hold		Swing		

==== May 1954 ====
1954 (as Hugh Oldham)
Party	Candidate	Votes	%	±%
Labour	S. Humphries	3,162	76.8	−0.2
Conservative	A. Gregory	955	23.2	+0.2
Majority		2,207	53.6	−0.4
Turnout		4,117		
Labour gain from Independent Labour		Swing		

==== May 1955 ====
1955
Party	Candidate	Votes	%	±%
Labour	A. Donovan*	2,337	71.2	−5.6
Conservative	J. Doherty	795	23.2	+1.0
Communist	F. Farrell	152	4.6	N/A
Majority		1,542	47.0	−6.6
Turnout		3,284		
Labour hold		Swing		

==== May 1956 ====
1956
Party	Candidate	Votes	%	±%
Labour	J. B. Ogden*	1,691	72.8	+1.6
Conservative	J. C. Brearley	475	20.4	−2.8
Communist	E. Cohen	157	6.8	+2.2
Majority		1,216	52.4	+5.4
Turnout		2,323		
Labour hold		Swing		

==== May 1957 ====
1957
Party	Candidate	Votes	%	±%
Labour	S. Humphries*	2,476	85.9	+13.1
Conservative	J. Jones	303	10.5	−9.9
Communist	E. Cohen	103	3.6	−3.2
Majority		2,173	75.4	+23.0
Turnout		2,882		
Labour hold		Swing		

==== May 1958 ====
1958
Party	Candidate	Votes	%	±%
Labour	H. Langan	2,260	83.4	−2.5
Conservative	J. Wilkinson	337	12.4	+1.9
Communist	E. Cohen	114	4.2	+0.6
Majority		1,923	71.0	−4.4
Turnout		2,711		
Labour hold		Swing		

==== May 1959 ====
1959
Party	Candidate	Votes	%	±%
Labour	J. B. Ogden*	2,076	75.5	−7.9
Conservative	I. Burgess	492	17.9	+5.5
Communist	E. Cohen	180	6.6	+2.4
Majority		1,584	57.6	−13.4
Turnout		2,748		
Labour hold		Swing		

=== Elections in 1960s ===
==== May 1960 ====
1960
Party	Candidate	Votes	%	±%
Labour	S. Humphries*	1,665	69.8	−5.7
Conservative	L. N. Mallinson	558	23.4	+5.5
Communist	E. Cohen	161	6.8	+0.2
Majority		1,107	46.4	−11.2
Turnout		2,384		
Labour hold		Swing		

==== May 1961 ====
1961
Party	Candidate	Votes	%	±%
Labour	H. Langan*	1,553	71.1	+1.3
Conservative	P. Murphy	479	21.9	−1.5
Communist	E. Cohen	151	7.0	+0.2
Majority		1,074	49.2	+2.8
Turnout		2,183		
Labour hold		Swing		

==== May 1962 ====
1962
Party	Candidate	Votes	%	±%
Labour	J. B. Ogden*	1,441	78.2	+7.1
Conservative	M. J. K. McGregor	245	13.3	−8.6
Communist	E. Cohen	115	6.2	−0.8
Union Movement	E. Keeling	43	2.3	N/A
Majority		1,196	64.9	+15.7
Turnout		1,844		
Labour hold		Swing		

==== March 1963 (by-election) ====
By-election: 7 March 1963
Party	Candidate	Votes	%	±%
Labour	A. Nicholson	946	84.0	+5.8
Conservative	J. H. Tresman	112	9.9	−3.4
Independent	R. J. Marsden	68	6.1	N/A
Majority		834	74.1	+9.2
Turnout		1,126		
Labour hold		Swing		

==== May 1963 ====
1963
Party	Candidate	Votes	%	±%
Labour	S. Humphries*	1,481	86.6	+8.4
Conservative	J. D. Cheetham	230	13.4	+0.1
Majority		1,251	73.2	+8.3
Turnout		1,711		
Labour hold		Swing		

==== May 1964 ====
1964
Party	Candidate	Votes	%	±%
Labour	A. Nicholson*	786	81.4	−5.2
Conservative	T. E. Murphy	180	18.6	+5.2
Majority		606	62.8	−10.4
Turnout		966		
Labour hold		Swing		

==== May 1965 ====
1965
Party	Candidate	Votes	%	±%
Labour	J. B. Ogden*	649	67.1	−14.3
Conservative	K. Allday	272	28.1	+9.5
Communist	E. Cohen	46	4.8	N/A
Majority		377	39.0	−23.8
Turnout		967		
Labour hold		Swing		

==== May 1966 ====
1966
Party	Candidate	Votes	%	±%
Labour	S. Humphries*	723	77.3	+10.2
Conservative	L. S. Smythe	212	22.7	−5.4
Majority		511	54.6	+15.6
Turnout		935		
Labour hold		Swing		

==== May 1967 ====
1967
Party	Candidate	Votes	%	±%
Labour	A. Nicolson*	483	58.9	−18.4
Conservative	A. J. Walker	337	41.1	+18.4
Majority		146	17.8	−36.8
Turnout		820		
Labour hold		Swing		

==== March 1968 (by-election) ====
By-election: 14 March 1968
Party	Candidate	Votes	%	±%
Labour	S. V. Shaw	709	56.5	−2.4
Conservative	P. M. Dyas	410	32.7	−8.4
Liberal	S. Rose	135	10.8	N/A
Majority		299	23.8	+6.0
Turnout		1,254		
Labour hold		Swing		

==== May 1968 ====
1968
Party	Candidate	Votes	%	±%
Labour	J. B. Ogden*	562	58.1	−0.8
Conservative	V. R. Cattan	347	35.9	−5.2
Liberal	J. R. Clements	58	6.0	N/A
Majority		215	22.2	+4.4
Turnout		967		
Labour hold		Swing		

==== May 1969 ====
1969
Party	Candidate	Votes	%	±%
Labour	S. V. Shaw*	767	55.5	−2.6
Conservative	R. E. Lilley	317	22.9	−13.0
Liberal	L. J. Howard	299	21.6	+15.6
Majority		450	32.6	+10.4
Turnout		1,383		
Labour hold		Swing		

=== Elections in 1970s ===
==== May 1970 ====
1970
Party	Candidate	Votes	%	±%
Labour	A. Nicholson*	897	77.5	+22.0
Conservative	D. A. Harding	171	14.8	−8.1
Liberal	J. H. Colclough	90	7.7	−13.9
Majority		726	62.7	+30.1
Turnout		1,158		
Labour hold		Swing		

== See also ==
- Manchester City Council
- Manchester City Council elections
