= 1968 Manchester City Council election =

UK local government election

- 9 May 1968

41 of 152 seats to Manchester City Council 77 seats needed for a majority
	First party	Second party
Party	Conservative	Labour
Last election	27 seats, 58.3%	11 seats, 34.4%
Seats before	80	72
Seats won	33	8
Seats after	91	61
Seat change	▲11	▼11
Popular vote	82,538	38,785
Percentage	62.4%	29.3%
Swing	▲4.1%	▼5.1%
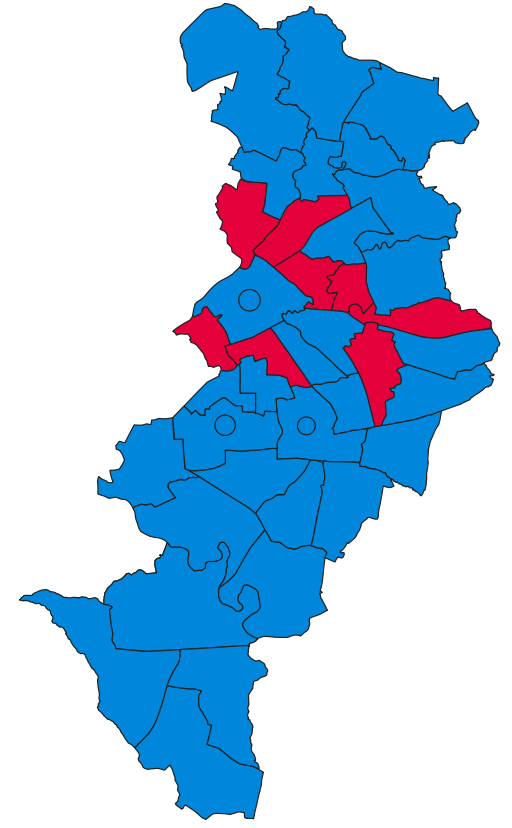
- Map of results of 1968 election
Leader of the Council before election
Conservative
Leader of the Council after election
Conservative

Elections to Manchester City Council were held on Thursday, 9 May 1968. One third of the councillors seats were up for election, with each successful candidate to serve a three-year term of office. The Conservative Party retained overall control of the council.

== Election result ==
Party	Votes		Seats			Full Council	
Conservative Party	82,538 (62.4%)	▲4.1	33 (80.5%)	33 / 41	▲11	91 (59.9%)	91 / 152
Labour Party	38,785 (29.3%)	▼5.1	8 (19.5%)	8 / 41	▼11	61 (40.1%)	61 / 152
Liberal Party	9,465 (7.2%)	▲1.5	0 (0.0%)	0 / 41	Steady	0 (0.0%)	0 / 152
Communist	1,175 (0.9%)	▲0.1	0 (0.0%)	0 / 41	Steady	0 (0.0%)	0 / 152
Union Movement	183 (0.1%)	Steady	0 (0.0%)	0 / 41	Steady	0 (0.0%)	0 / 152
Residents	63 (0.0%)	N/A	0 (0.0%)	0 / 41	N/A	0 (0.0%)	0 / 152

=== Full council ===
↓
61	91

=== Aldermen ===
↓
21	17

=== Councillors ===
↓
40	74

== Ward results ==
=== Alexandra Park ===
Alexandra Park (2 vacancies)
Party	Candidate	Votes	%	±%
Conservative	J. B. Chapman	3,475	69.3	+2.8
Conservative	M. Flynn	3,428	68.3	+1.8
Liberal	E. O. Tomlinson	1,147	22.9	+1.3
Liberal	F. Griffiths	1,104	22.0	+0.4
Labour	E. McKeon	394	7.9	−4.0
Majority		2,281	45.4	+0.5
Turnout		5,016		
Conservative hold		Swing		
Conservative hold		Swing		

=== All Saints' ===
All Saints'
Party	Candidate	Votes	%	±%
Labour	H. Conway*	309	52.3	−1.0
Conservative	F. Hewerdine	282	47.7	+1.0
Majority		27	4.6	−2.0
Turnout		591		
Labour hold		Swing		

=== Ardwick ===
Ardwick
Party	Candidate	Votes	%	±%
Conservative	G. Taylor	666	57.9	+4.5
Labour	K. J. Hill*	484	42.1	−4.5
Majority		182	15.8	+9.0
Turnout		1,150		
Conservative gain from Labour		Swing		

=== Baguley ===
Baguley
Party	Candidate	Votes	%	±%
Conservative	I. K. Paley*	3,438	58.5	−1.2
Labour	F. H. Price	2,055	35.0	−5.3
Liberal	K. N. Medhurst	379	6.5	N/A
Majority		1,383	23.5	+4.1
Turnout		5,872		
Conservative hold		Swing		

=== Barlow Moor ===
Barlow Moor
Party	Candidate	Votes	%	±%
Conservative	B. Moore*	1,977	57.9	+2.0
Liberal	R. H. Hargreaves	948	27.8	−0.6
Labour	D. G. Ford	490	14.3	−1.4
Majority		1,029	30.1	+2.6
Turnout		3,415		
Conservative hold		Swing		

=== Benchill ===
Benchill
Party	Candidate	Votes	%	±%
Conservative	B. B. Williams*	3,112	61.4	+3.0
Labour	R. L. Griffiths	1,815	35.8	−3.9
Communist	M. Taylor	142	2.8	+0.9
Majority		1,297	25.6	+6.9
Turnout		5,069		
Conservative hold		Swing		

=== Beswick ===
Beswick
Party	Candidate	Votes	%	±%
Labour	J. G. Birtles*	922	62.2	−1.4
Conservative	R. Lilley	560	37.8	+15.0
Majority		362	24.4	−16.4
Turnout		1,482		
Labour hold		Swing		

=== Blackley ===
Blackley
Party	Candidate	Votes	%	±%
Conservative	W. Harper*	2,798	72.0	+3.0
Labour	A. E. Halliday	623	16.0	−3.6
Liberal	J. M. Ashley	463	11.9	+2.3
Majority		2,175	56.0	+6.6
Turnout		3,884		
Conservative hold		Swing		

=== Bradford ===
Bradford
Party	Candidate	Votes	%	±%
Conservative	D. Silverman	1,963	53.0	+5.1
Labour	J. E. Jackson*	1,645	44.4	−4.3
Communist	D. Maher	97	2.6	−0.8
Majority		318	8.6	
Turnout		3,705		
Conservative gain from Labour		Swing		

=== Burnage ===
Burnage
Party	Candidate	Votes	%	±%
Conservative	H. Platt*	2,842	68.5	+1.0
Labour	J. F. Lilley	799	19.3	−4.8
Liberal	S. B. Downs	508	12.2	+3.8
Majority		2,043	49.2	+5.8
Turnout		4,149		
Conservative hold		Swing		

=== Cheetham ===
Cheetham
Party	Candidate	Votes	%	±%
Conservative	A. J. Walker	1,171	58.6	+4.4
Labour	J. Broderick*	702	35.1	−5.1
Communist	H. Ogden	126	6.3	+0.7
Majority		469	23.5	+9.5
Turnout		1,999		
Conservative gain from Labour		Swing		

=== Chorlton-cum-Hardy ===
Chorlton-cum-Hardy
Party	Candidate	Votes	%	±%
Conservative	A. D. Ashley*	3,843	86.3	+14.9
Labour	A. Holland	609	13.7	−2.8
Majority		3,234	72.6	+17.7
Turnout		4,452		
Conservative hold		Swing		

=== Collegiate Church ===
Collegiate Church
Party	Candidate	Votes	%	±%
Labour	R. F. Delahunty*	712	54.2	−10.3
Conservative	V. Taylor	535	40.8	+14.3
Communist	E. A. Whinney	66	5.0	−4.0
Majority		177	13.4	−24.6
Turnout		1,313		
Labour hold		Swing		

=== Crumpsall ===
Crumpsall
Party	Candidate	Votes	%	±%
Conservative	F. R. Butler*	3,794	60.0	+4.5
Labour	F. J Balcombe	2,528	40.0	−5.5
Majority		1,266	20.0	+11.0
Turnout		6,322		
Conservative hold		Swing		

=== Didsbury ===
Didsbury
Party	Candidate	Votes	%	±%
Conservative	D. Lee*	4,207	78.2	−5.8
Labour	D. Beetham	637	11.8	−4.2
Liberal	S. Rose	540	10.0	N/A
Majority		3,570	66.4	−1.6
Turnout		5,384		
Conservative hold		Swing		

=== Gorton North ===
Gorton North
Party	Candidate	Votes	%	±%
Conservative	G. H. Gilbertson	2,172	52.5	+10.0
Labour	W. Lister	1,786	43.2	−3.5
Communist	R. Felton	179	4.3	+1.0
Majority		386	9.3	
Turnout		4,137		
Conservative gain from Labour		Swing		

=== Gorton South ===
Gorton South
Party	Candidate	Votes	%	±%
Conservative	L. H. Nield	1,764	56.8	+2.3
Labour	G. Conquest*	1,343	43.2	−2.3
Majority		421	13.6	+4.6
Turnout		3,107		
Conservative gain from Labour		Swing		

=== Harpurhey ===
Harpurhey
Party	Candidate	Votes	%	±%
Conservative	E. F. Thornhill	1,332	59.0	+4.5
Labour	E. Grant*	924	41.0	−4.5
Majority		408	18.0	+9.0
Turnout		2,256		
Conservative gain from Labour		Swing		

=== Hugh Oldham ===
Hugh Oldham
Party	Candidate	Votes	%	±%
Labour	J. B. Ogden*	562	58.1	−0.8
Conservative	V. R. Cattan	347	35.9	−5.2
Liberal	J. R. Clements	58	6.0	N/A
Majority		215	22.2	+4.4
Turnout		967		
Labour hold		Swing		

=== Levenshulme ===
Levenshulme
Party	Candidate	Votes	%	±%
Conservative	J. K. Barber*	2,997	74.2	−0.5
Labour	S. Rimmer	691	17.1	−8.2
Liberal	R. P. Shippen	350	8.7	N/A
Majority		2,306	57.1	+7.7
Turnout		4,038		
Conservative hold		Swing		

=== Lightbowne ===
Lightbowne
Party	Candidate	Votes	%	±%
Conservative	H. Pigott*	2,946	61.9	+15.4
Labour	K. Franklin	1,703	35.7	−0.1
Communist	R. Cole	114	2.4	+1.1
Majority		1,243	26.2	+15.5
Turnout		4,763		
Conservative hold		Swing		

=== Longsight ===
Longsight
Party	Candidate	Votes	%	±%
Conservative	A. Malpas*	1,748	78.1	+7.6
Labour	W. F. Lister	301	13.5	−9.1
Communist	H. Johnson	110	4.9	+1.7
Union Movement	J. R. Marsden	78	3.5	−0.2
Majority		1,447	64.6	+16.7
Turnout		2,237		
Conservative hold		Swing		

=== Miles Platting ===
Miles Platting
Party	Candidate	Votes	%	±%
Conservative	F. W. Lever	983	52.5	−2.2
Labour	J. S. Goldstone*	888	47.5	+2.2
Majority		95	5.0	−4.4
Turnout		1,871		
Conservative gain from Labour		Swing		

=== Moss Side East ===
Moss Side East
Party	Candidate	Votes	%	±%
Conservative	J. F. Ridley	1,382	55.8	−3.8
Labour	W. A. Downward*	938	37.9	−2.5
Liberal	M. Howard	157	6.3	N/A
Majority		444	17.9	−1.3
Turnout		2,477		
Conservative gain from Labour		Swing		

=== Moss Side West ===
Moss Side West
Party	Candidate	Votes	%	±%
Conservative	S. D. Alexander*	1,622	76.3	+5.1
Labour	S. N. M. Moxley	329	15.5	−13.3
Liberal	L. J. Howard	176	8.3	N/A
Majority		1,293	60.8	+18.4
Turnout		2,127		
Conservative hold		Swing		

=== Moston ===
Moston
Party	Candidate	Votes	%	±%
Conservative	R. H. Hine*	3,099	68.4	+3.5
Labour	G. Halstead	1,432	31.6	−3.5
Majority		1,667	36.8	+7.0
Turnout		4,531		
Conservative hold		Swing		

=== New Cross ===
New Cross
Party	Candidate	Votes	%	±%
Labour	E. Donaghue*	903	58.1	+2.1
Conservative	A. Hawkins	650	41.9	−2.1
Majority		253	16.2	+4.2
Turnout		1,553		
Labour hold		Swing		

=== Newton Heath ===
Newton Heath
Party	Candidate	Votes	%	±%
Conservative	J. Foran	1,510	46.7	−6.3
Labour	C. Tomlinson*	1,452	44.9	+3.7
Liberal	R. Jackson	272	8.4	N/A
Majority		58	1.8	−10.0
Turnout		3,234		
Conservative gain from Labour		Swing		

=== Northenden ===
Northenden
Party	Candidate	Votes	%	±%
Conservative	T. Mountford*	3,847	62.2	+1.9
Labour	H. Brown	1,584	25.7	−3.9
Liberal	J. Williams	749	12.1	+2.0
Majority		2,263	36.5	+5.8
Turnout		6,180		
Conservative hold		Swing		

=== Old Moat ===
Old Moat
Party	Candidate	Votes	%	±%
Conservative	G. Robinson*	2,527	68.6	+8.9
Labour	R. K. Litherland	830	22.5	−7.6
Liberal	A. Burns	326	8.9	−1.3
Majority		1,697	46.1	+16.5
Turnout		3,683		
Conservative hold		Swing		

=== Openshaw ===
Openshaw
Party	Candidate	Votes	%	±%
Labour	J. Gilmore*	1,757	48.1	−0.2
Conservative	J. L. Traynor	1,668	45.7	−1.6
Communist	N. Gilroy	227	6.2	+1.8
Majority		89	2.4	+1.4
Turnout		3,652		
Labour hold		Swing		

=== Rusholme ===
Rusholme (2 vacancies)
Party	Candidate	Votes	%	±%
Conservative	K. Ollerenshaw*	2,664	77.5	+4.8
Conservative	A. G. Thornhill	2,442	71.1	−1.6
Labour	A. E. Jones	456	13.3	−4.1
Labour	W. Egerton	352	10.2	−7.2
Liberal	S. Lowe	317	9.2	+1.9
Liberal	A. J. Markin	258	7.5	+0.2
Majority		1,896	55.2	−0.1
Turnout		3,437		
Conservative hold		Swing		
Conservative hold		Swing		

=== St. George's ===
St. George's
Party	Candidate	Votes	%	±%
Labour	G. Mann*	375	58.6	+8.8
Conservative	T. J. Casby	265	41.4	+1.2
Majority		110	17.2	+7.6
Turnout		640		
Labour hold		Swing		

=== St. Luke's ===
St. Luke's
Party	Candidate	Votes	%	±%
Conservative	T. Clinton	908	51.4	−4.8
Labour	W. Massey*	860	48.6	+4.8
Majority		48	2.7	−9.6
Turnout		1,768		
Conservative gain from Labour		Swing		

=== St. Mark's ===
St. Mark's
Party	Candidate	Votes	%	±%
Labour	N. Morris*	1,191	49.1	−2.7
Conservative	A. Welsby	1,065	43.9	+7.5
Union Movement	D. S. Lawson	105	4.3	N/A
Residents	A. W. King	63	2.6	N/A
Majority		126	5.2	−10.2
Turnout		2,424		
Labour hold		Swing		

=== St. Peter's ===
St. Peter's (2 vacancies)
Party	Candidate	Votes	%	±%
Conservative	R. J. Rubery	810	69.7	+5.0
Conservative	J. Carson*	792	68.2	+3.5
Labour	C. B. Muir	264	22.7	−4.5
Labour	A. S. Goldstone	228	19.6	−7.6
Liberal	J. E. Hargreaves	88	7.8	−0.3
Majority		528	45.5	+8.0
Turnout		1,162		
Conservative hold		Swing		
Conservative hold		Swing		

=== Withington ===
Withington
Party	Candidate	Votes	%	±%
Conservative	G. W. Young*	2,496	57.3	−2.6
Liberal	K. Pinnock	1,258	28.9	+2.4
Labour	D. G. Clark	603	13.8	+0.2
Majority		1,238	28.4	−5.0
Turnout		4,357		
Conservative hold		Swing		

=== Woodhouse Park ===
Woodhouse Park
Party	Candidate	Votes	%	±%
Conservative	M. S. Burgoyne	2,411	46.4	−0.7
Labour	M. J. Taylor*	2,309	44.4	−6.2
Liberal	P. Grinyer	367	7.1	N/A
Communist	E. Holt	114	2.2	−0.1
Majority		102	2.0	
Turnout		5,201		
Conservative gain from Labour		Swing		

== Aldermanic election ==
=== Aldermanic election, 31 July 1968 ===
Caused by the resignation on 19 August 1968 of Alderman Chris Blackwell (Labour, elected as an alderman by the council on 7 April 1965).

In his place, Councillor Dr. Harry Pigott (Conservative, Lightbowne, elected 25 September 1952) was elected as an alderman by the council on 31 July 1968.

Party	Alderman	Ward	Term expires
Conservative	Dr. Harry Pigott	Crumpsall	1973

=== Aldermanic election, 4 September 1968 ===
Caused by the resignation on 19 August 1968 of Alderman Harold Quinney (Labour, elected as an alderman by the council on 2 June 1952).

In his place, Councillor Dorothy Lee (Conservative, Didsbury, elected 7 May 1953) was elected as an alderman by the council on 4 September 1968.

Party	Alderman	Ward	Term expires
Conservative	Dorothy Lee	St. Mark's	1970

== By-elections between 1968 and 1969 ==
=== Lightbowne, 26 September 1968 ===
Caused by the election as an alderman of Councillor Dr. Harry Pigott (Conservative, Lightbowne, elected 25 September 1952) on 31 July 1968, following the resignation on 19 August 1968 of Alderman Chris Blackwell (Labour, elected as an alderman by the council on 7 April 1965).

Lightbowne
Party	Candidate	Votes	%	±%
Conservative	J. Jackson	1,716	49.2	−12.7
Labour	K. Franklin	1,707	48.9	+13.2
Communist	R. Cole	65	1.9	−0.5
Majority		9	0.3	−25.9
Turnout		3,488		
Conservative hold		Swing		

=== Didsbury, 17 October 1968 ===
Caused by the election as an alderman of Councillor Dorothy Lee (Conservative, Didsbury, elected 7 May 1953) on 4 September 1968 following the resignation on 19 August 1968 of Alderman Harold Quinney (Labour, elected as an alderman by the council on 2 June 1952).

Didsbury
Party	Candidate	Votes	%	±%
Conservative	J. Hill	2,761	74.6	−3.6
Liberal	S. B. Downs	488	13.2	+3.2
Labour	D. Beetham	453	12.2	+0.4
Majority		2,273	61.4	−5.0
Turnout		3,702		
Conservative hold		Swing		

=== By-elections, 24 October 1968 ===
Two by-elections were held on 24 October 1968 to fill vacancies which had arisen in the city council.

==== Ardwick ====
Caused by the resignation of Councillor Frank Taylor (Labour, Ardwick, elected 13 May 1954) on 19 September 1968.

Ardwick
Party	Candidate	Votes	%	±%
Labour	H. Barratt	750	60.7	+18.6
Conservative	A. E. Welsby	486	39.3	−18.6
Majority		264	21.4	
Turnout		1,236		
Labour hold		Swing		

==== Miles Platting ====
Caused by the resignation of Councillor Eric Hughes (Labour, Miles Platting, elected 12 May 1960) on 19 September 1968.

Miles Platting
Party	Candidate	Votes	%	±%
Labour	J. S. Goldstone	1,124	58.2	+10.7
Conservative	J. Priestley	806	41.8	−10.7
Majority		318	16.4	
Turnout		1,930		
Labour hold		Swing		

=== Openshaw, 27 February 1969 ===
Caused by the resignation of Councillor Peter Donoghue (Labour, Openshaw, elected 7 November 1963) on 23 January 1969.

Openshaw
Party	Candidate	Votes	%	±%
Labour	E. Grant	1,610	56.0	+7.9
Conservative	A. Nixon	1,161	40.4	−5.3
Communist	N. Gilroy	106	3.6	−2.6
Majority		449	15.6	+13.2
Turnout		2,877		
Labour hold		Swing		

=== Baguley, 13 March 1969 ===
Caused by the resignation of Councillor Ian Paley (Conservative, Baguley, elected 13 May 1965) on 8 November 1968.

Baguley
Party	Candidate	Votes	%	±%
Conservative	M. Malbon	1,912	51.7	−6.8
Labour	F. H. Price	1,788	48.3	+13.3
Majority		124	3.4	−20.1
Turnout		3,700		
Conservative hold		Swing		
