= 1952 Manchester City Council election =

Local election in Manchester, England

- 8 May 1952

38 of 144 seats to Manchester City Council 73 seats needed for a majority
	First party	Second party	Third party
Party	Conservative	Labour	Liberal
Last election	22 seats, 56.7%	14 seats, 41.3%	0 seats, 1.6%
Seats before	76	62	6
Seats won	15	23	0
Seats after	70	68	6
Seat change	▼6	▲6	Steady
Popular vote	110,592	138,306	2,882
Percentage	43.8%	54.8%	1.1%
Swing	▼12.9%	▲13.5%	▼0.5%
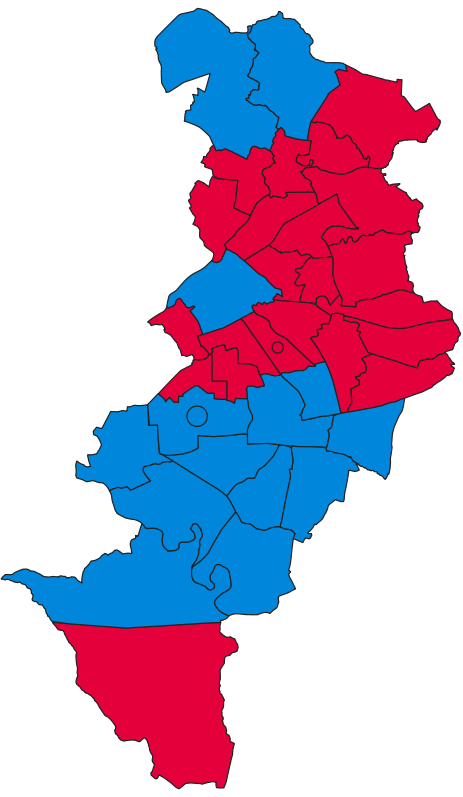
- Map of results of 1952 election
Leader of the Council before election
Conservative
Leader of the Council after election
No overall control

Elections to Manchester City Council were held on Thursday, 8 May 1952. One third of the councillors seats were up for election, with each successful candidate to serve a three-year term of office. The Conservative Party lost overall control of the council.

== Election result ==
Party	Votes		Seats			Full Council	
Conservative Party	110,592 (43.8%)	▼12.9	15 (39.5%)	15 / 38	▼6	70 (48.6%)	70 / 144
Labour Party	138,306 (54.8%)	▲13.5	23 (60.5%)	23 / 38	▲6	68 (47.2%)	68 / 144
Liberal Party	2,882 (1.1%)	▼0.5	0 (0.0%)	0 / 38	Steady	6 (4.2%)	6 / 144
Communist	371 (0.1%)	▼0.2	0 (0.0%)	0 / 38	Steady	0 (0.0%)	0 / 144
Independent	162 (0.1%)	Steady	0 (0.0%)	0 / 38	Steady	0 (0.0%)	0 / 144
Union Movement	90 (0.0%)	N/A	0 (0.0%)	0 / 38	N/A	0 (0.0%)	0 / 144

=== Full council ===
↓
68	6	70

=== Aldermen ===
↓
13	6	17

=== Councillors ===
↓
55	53

== Ward results ==
=== Alexandra Park ===
Alexandra Park (2 vacancies)
Party	Candidate	Votes	%	±%
Conservative	L. Bailey*	4,746	71.6	−8.0
Conservative	T. E. Bird*	4,731	71.3	−8.3
Labour	K. Pollitt	1,907	28.8	+8.4
Labour	L. Drury	1,877	28.3	+7.9
Majority		2,824	42.5	−16.7
Turnout		6,631		
Conservative hold		Swing		
Conservative hold		Swing		

=== All Saints' ===
All Saints'
Party	Candidate	Votes	%	±%
Labour	A. Littlemore	3,337	64.1	+21.5
Conservative	H. Ackerley*	1,871	35.9	−21.5
Majority		1,466	28.2	
Turnout		5,208		
Labour gain from Conservative		Swing		

=== Ardwick ===
Ardwick
Party	Candidate	Votes	%	±%
Labour	W. Parkins	4,441	60.9	+18.9
Conservative	T. Dobbins*	2,847	39.1	−18.9
Majority		1,594	21.8	
Turnout		7,288		
Labour gain from Conservative		Swing		

=== Barlow Moor ===
Barlow Moor
Party	Candidate	Votes	%	±%
Conservative	W. J. Pegge*	2,570	57.1	−13.7
Labour	F. O'Rourke	1,932	42.9	+13.7
Majority		638	14.2	−27.4
Turnout		4,502		
Conservative hold		Swing		

=== Beswick ===
Beswick
Party	Candidate	Votes	%	±%
Labour	W. Winstanley	4,794	75.6	+11.8
Conservative	C. P. R. Dunn	1,546	24.4	−11.8
Majority		3,248	51.2	+23.6
Turnout		6,340		
Labour hold		Swing		

=== Blackley ===
Blackley
Party	Candidate	Votes	%	±%
Conservative	J. Hart*	4,237	50.2	−14.8
Labour	E. Dell	4,195	49.8	+14.8
Majority		42	0.4	−29.6
Turnout		8,432		
Conservative hold		Swing		

=== Bradford ===
Bradford
Party	Candidate	Votes	%	±%
Labour	T. Lomas	5,366	72.3	+15.2
Conservative	E. Rooney	2,053	27.7	−15.2
Majority		3,313	44.6	+30.4
Turnout		7,419		
Labour hold		Swing		

=== Burnage ===
Burnage
Party	Candidate	Votes	%	±%
Conservative	G. Lord	4,368	56.1	−9.8
Labour	J. Stuart Cole	3,420	43.9	+9.8
Majority		948	12.2	−19.6
Turnout		7,788		
Conservative hold		Swing		

=== Cheetham ===
Cheetham
Party	Candidate	Votes	%	±%
Labour	H. Goldstone*	3,326	63.0	+22.1
Conservative	E. Mawdsley	1,950	37.0	−3.6
Majority		1,376	26.0	+25.7
Turnout		5,276		
Labour hold		Swing		

=== Chorlton-cum-Hardy ===
Chorlton-cum-Hardy
Party	Candidate	Votes	%	±%
Conservative	M. S. Whittaker*	4,600	73.7	−9.3
Labour	C. E. Bedgood	1,642	26.3	+9.3
Majority		2,958	47.4	−18.6
Turnout		6,242		
Conservative hold		Swing		

=== Collegiate Church ===
Collegiate Church
Party	Candidate	Votes	%	±%
Labour	B. S. Langton*	3,674	80.6	+8.2
Conservative	W. Hoyle-Smith	731	16.0	−5.9
Communist	M. I. Druck	153	3.4	−2.3
Majority		2,943	64.6	+14.1
Turnout		4,558		
Labour hold		Swing		

=== Crumpsall ===
Crumpsall
Party	Candidate	Votes	%	±%
Conservative	W. Tomlinson*	4,248	54.4	−11.3
Labour	D. Mellor	3,555	45.6	+11.3
Majority		693	8.8	−22.6
Turnout		7,803		
Conservative hold		Swing		

=== Didsbury ===
Didsbury
Party	Candidate	Votes	%	±%
Conservative	E. Hill*	4,530	77.1	−7.6
Labour	L. L. Hanbridge	1,347	22.9	+7.6
Majority		3,183	54.2	−15.2
Turnout		5,877		
Conservative hold		Swing		

=== Gorton North ===
Gorton North
Party	Candidate	Votes	%	±%
Labour	F. Lord*	5,888	74.3	+14.1
Conservative	S. W. Marshall	1,820	23.0	−14.2
Communist	J. Kay	218	2.7	+0.1
Majority		4,068	51.3	+28.3
Turnout		7,926		
Labour hold		Swing		

=== Gorton South ===
Gorton South
Party	Candidate	Votes	%	±%
Labour	E. Yarwood*	3,927	69.3	+14.9
Conservative	W. Fuller	1,741	30.7	−12.4
Majority		2,186	38.6	+27.3
Turnout		5,668		
Labour hold		Swing		

=== Harpurhey ===
Harpurhey
Party	Candidate	Votes	%	±%
Labour	H. P. J. Hinderer*	4,383	61.6	+16.4
Conservative	T. Brunt	2,737	38.4	−16.4
Majority		1,646	23.2	
Turnout		7,120		
Labour hold		Swing		

=== Levenshulme ===
Levenshulme
Party	Candidate	Votes	%	±%
Conservative	J. Bowes*	4,384	57.1	−13.9
Labour	F. Hatton	3,298	42.9	+13.9
Majority		1,086	14.2	−27.8
Turnout		7,682		
Conservative hold		Swing		

=== Lightbowne ===
Lightbowne
Party	Candidate	Votes	%	±%
Labour	R. Malcolm*	4,600	46.9	+10.6
Conservative	H. Piggott	4,544	46.3	−6.8
Liberal	C. N. Higginson	666	6.8	−3.8
Majority		56	0.6	
Turnout		9,810		
Labour hold		Swing		

=== Longsight ===
Longsight
Party	Candidate	Votes	%	±%
Conservative	J. Hopkins*	3,315	53.3	−11.0
Labour	J. B. Ogden	2,303	37.0	+10.4
Liberal	F. N. Wedlock	607	9.7	+0.6
Majority		1,012	16.3	−21.4
Turnout		6,225		
Conservative hold		Swing		

=== Miles Platting ===
Miles Platting
Party	Candidate	Votes	%	±%
Labour	H. Quinney*	3,881	72.9	+16.3
Conservative	E. D. Houseley	1,443	27.1	−16.3
Majority		2,438	45.8	+32.6
Turnout		5,324		
Labour hold		Swing		

=== Moss Side East ===
Moss Side East
Party	Candidate	Votes	%	±%
Labour	W. A. Downward	3,597	59.0	+22.5
Conservative	C. Cuffin*	2,498	41.0	−22.5
Majority		1,099	18.0	
Turnout		6,095		
Labour gain from Conservative		Swing		

=== Moss Side West ===
Moss Side West
Party	Candidate	Votes	%	±%
Labour	H. Collins	3,277	51.6	+13.0
Conservative	W. H. Cox*	2,983	47.0	−14.4
Union Movement	E. J. Hamm	90	1.4	N/A
Majority		294	4.6	
Turnout		6,350		
Labour gain from Conservative		Swing		

=== Moston ===
Moston
Party	Candidate	Votes	%	±%
Labour	C. C. Lamb*	5,428	60.3	+13.3
Conservative	F. Kay	3,575	39.7	−13.3
Majority		1,853	20.6	
Turnout		9,003		
Labour hold		Swing		

=== New Cross ===
New Cross
Party	Candidate	Votes	%	±%
Labour	C. Blackwell*	3,173	66.6	+11.0
Conservative	E. Griffiths	1,432	30.0	−11.9
Independent	N. Robinson	162	3.4	+0.9
Majority		1,741	36.6	+22.9
Turnout		4,767		
Labour hold		Swing		

=== Newton Heath ===
Newton Heath
Party	Candidate	Votes	%	±%
Labour	A. Logan*	4,319	69.6	+14.3
Conservative	W. H. Priestnall	1,886	30.4	−14.3
Majority		2,433	39.2	+28.6
Turnout		6,205		
Labour hold		Swing		

=== Newtown ===
Newtown
Party	Candidate	Votes	%	±%
Labour	A. Donovan*	4,366	81.7	+19.7
Conservative	J. J. Doyle	976	18.3	−19.7
Majority		3,390	63.4	+39.4
Turnout		5,342		
Labour hold		Swing		

=== Northenden ===
Northenden
Party	Candidate	Votes	%	±%
Conservative	J. L. Cobon*	3,293	46.6	−20.4
Labour	W. Gallagher	2,882	40.8	+7.8
Liberal	H. Beattie	896	12.6	N/A
Majority		411	5.8	−28.2
Turnout		7,071		
Conservative hold		Swing		

=== Old Moat ===
Old Moat
Party	Candidate	Votes	%	±%
Conservative	H. P. Humphris*	3,250	57.8	−12.4
Labour	W. A. Dove	2,369	42.2	+12.4
Majority		881	15.6	−24.8
Turnout		5,619		
Conservative hold		Swing		

=== Openshaw ===
Openshaw
Party	Candidate	Votes	%	±%
Labour	L. Thomas*	5,607	74.5	+16.7
Conservative	L. Lescure	1,924	25.5	−13.4
Majority		3,683	49.0	+30.1
Turnout		7,531		
Labour hold		Swing		

=== Rusholme ===
Rusholme
Party	Candidate	Votes	%	±%
Conservative	H. Stockdale*	4,014	65.1	−16.6
Labour	B. Conlan	2,153	34.9	+16.6
Majority		1,861	30.2	−33.2
Turnout		6,167		
Conservative hold		Swing		

=== St. George's ===
St. George's
Party	Candidate	Votes	%	±%
Labour	R. E. Thomas*	4,023	71.1	+19.9
Conservative	J. E. McManus	1,637	28.9	−16.2
Majority		2,386	42.2	+36.0
Turnout		5,660		
Labour hold		Swing		

=== St. Luke's ===
St. Luke's (2 vacancies)
Party	Candidate	Votes	%	±%
Labour	W. Massey	3,580	57.1	+17.1
Labour	J. Conway	3,204	51.1	+11.1
Conservative	J. F. Martin*	2,952	47.1	−12.9
Conservative	M. Hilbery	2,804	44.7	−15.3
Majority		252	4.0	
Turnout		6,270		
Labour gain from Conservative		Swing		
Labour gain from Conservative		Swing		

=== St. Mark's ===
St. Mark's
Party	Candidate	Votes	%	±%
Labour	W. Shaw*	4,539	67.5	+14.9
Conservative	N. Fins	2,181	32.5	−14.9
Majority		2,358	35.0	+29.8
Turnout		6,720		
Labour hold		Swing		

=== St. Peter's ===
St. Peter's
Party	Candidate	Votes	%	±%
Conservative	N. G. Westbrook*	1,987	63.5	−20.5
Labour	H. W. Bliss*	1,142	36.5	+20.5
Majority		845	27.0	−41.0
Turnout		3,129		
Conservative gain from Labour		Swing		

=== Withington ===
Withington
Party	Candidate	Votes	%	±%
Conservative	J. McGrath*	3,686	67.9	−2.1
Labour	W. Lister	1,029	19.0	+3.0
Liberal	F. W. Wilson	713	13.1	−0.9
Majority		2,657	48.9	−5.1
Turnout		5,428		
Conservative hold		Swing		

=== Wythenshawe ===
Wythenshawe
Party	Candidate	Votes	%	±%
Labour	H. Lloyd	10,525	70.0	+15.1
Conservative	W. Walmsley*	4,502	30.0	−15.1
Majority		6,023	40.0	+30.2
Turnout		15,027		
Labour gain from Conservative		Swing		

== Aldermanic elections ==
=== Aldermanic election, 2 July 1952 ===
Caused by the resignation on 23 June 1952 of Alderman Sir R. Noton Barclay (Liberal, elected as an alderman by the council on 5 September 1934).

In his place, Councillor Harold Quinney (Labour, Miles Platting, elected 5 February 1948; previously 1934-47) was elected as an alderman by the council on 2 July 1952.

Party	Alderman	Ward	Term expires
Labour	Harold Quinney	St. Mark's	1958

=== Aldermanic election, 30 July 1952 ===
Caused by the death on 30 June 1952 of Alderman Robert Malcolm (Labour, elected as an alderman by the council on 6 February 1952).

In his place, Councillor William Onions (Labour, Lightbowne, elected 20 March 1934; previously 1927-30) was elected as an alderman by the council on 30 July 1952.

Party	Alderman	Ward	Term expires
Labour	William Onions	Longsight	1958

=== Aldermanic elections, 2 December 1952 ===
Caused by the resignation on 21 November 1952 of Alderman Samuel Woollam (Conservative, elected as an alderman by the council on 9 November 1925).

In his place, Councillor C. E. P. Stott (Labour, Newton Heath, elected 1 November 1934) was elected as an alderman by the council on 2 December 1952.

Party	Alderman	Ward	Term expires
Labour	C. E. P. Stott	Chorlton-cum-Hardy	1955

Caused by the death on 24 November 1952 of Alderman Alfred James (Labour, elected as an alderman by the council on 5 June 1935).

In his place, Councillor William Collingson (Labour, Newtown, elected 1 November 1934) was elected as an alderman by the council on 2 December 1952.

Party	Alderman	Ward	Term expires
Labour	William Collingson	Beswick	1955

=== Aldermanic election, 31 March 1953 ===
Caused by the death on 25 February 1953 of Alderman Thomas Stone Williams (Liberal, elected as an alderman by the council on 4 April 1934).

In his place, Councillor Harry Frankland (Labour, Bradford, elected 1 November 1934) was elected as an alderman by the council on 31 March 1953.

Party	Alderman	Ward	Term expires
Labour	Harry Frankland	Cheetham	1958

=== Aldermanic election, 29 April 1953 ===
Caused by the death on 18 April 1953 of Alderman Harold White (Conservative, elected as an alderman by the council on 6 October 1937).

In his place, Councillor John Edward Pheasey (Conservative, Moss Side East, elected 15 May 1934) was elected as an alderman by the council on 29 April 1953.

Party	Alderman	Ward	Term expires
Conservative	John Edward Pheasey	Moss Side West	1958

== By-elections between 1952 and 1953 ==
=== Miles Platting, 28 August 1952 ===
Caused by the election as an alderman of Councillor Harold Quinney (Labour, Miles Platting, elected 5 February 1948; previously 1934-47) on 2 July 1952 following the resignation on 23 June 1952 of Alderman Sir R. Noton Barclay (Liberal, elected as an alderman by the council on 5 September 1934).

Miles Platting
Party	Candidate	Votes	%	±%
Labour	A. Stevenson	2,789	68.6	−4.3
Conservative	M. V. Sparks	1,276	31.4	+4.3
Majority		1,513	37.2	−8.6
Turnout		4,065		
Labour hold		Swing		

=== Lightbowne, 25 September 1952 ===
Caused by the election as an alderman of Councillor William Onions (Labour, Newtown, elected 20 March 1934; previously 1927-30) on 30 July 1952 following the death on 30 June 1952 of Alderman Robert Malcolm (Labour, elected as an alderman by the council on 6 February 1952).

Lightbowne
Party	Candidate	Votes	%	±%
Conservative	H. Piggott	4,180	51.8	+5.5
Labour	J. Clough	3,565	44.2	−2.7
Liberal	R. Frere	319	4.0	−2.8
Majority		615	7.6	
Turnout		8,064		
Conservative gain from Labour		Swing		
