= Old Moat (ward) =

- Ward
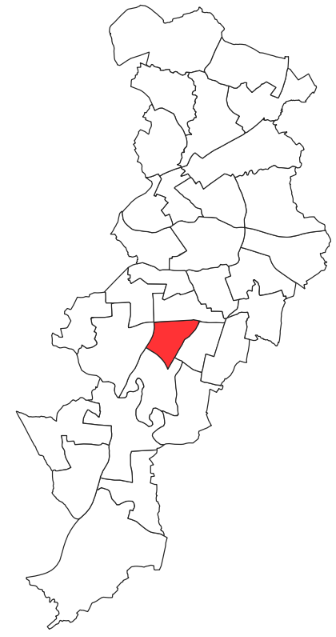
- Old Moat ward (2018) within Manchester

- Coat of arms
- Interactive map of Old Moat
- Country: United Kingdom
- Constituent country: England
- Region: North West England
- County: Greater Manchester
- Metropolitan borough: Manchester
- Created: May 1950
- Named for: Old Moat

Government
  - Type: Unicameral
  - Body: Manchester City Council
- UK Parliamentary Constituency: Manchester Withington

Old Moat is an electoral division of Manchester City Council which has been represented since 1950. It covers the Old Moat estate and parts of Withington in South Manchester.

== Overview ==
Old Moat ward was created in 1950, covering that part of the Withington ward to the west of Burton Road and Wilmslow Road. In 1971, the ward's northern boundary became the Fallowfield Loop, these boundaries were left largely unchanged by a further city-wide boundary revision in 1982. In 2004, that part of the ward to the south of former Manchester South District Railway line and to the west of Princess Road was transferred to the new Chorlton Park ward, these boundaries were retained at the latest revision in 2018, an area of Levenshulme ward to the north of the Fallowfield Loop was transferred to Burnage.

Since its creation, the ward formed has part of the Manchester Withington Parliamentary constituency.

== Councillors ==
Election	Councillor	Councillor	Councillor
1950	S. A. Gradwell (Con)	W. Sharp (Con)	H. P. Humphris (Con)
1951	W. R. Swan (Con)	W. Sharp (Con)	H. P. Humphris (Con)
1952	W. R. Swan (Con)	W. Sharp (Con)	H. P. Humphris (Con)
1953	W. R. Swan (Con)	W. Sharp (Con)	H. P. Humphris (Con)
1954	W. R. Swan (Con)	W. Sharp (Con)	H. P. Humphris (Con)
1955	W. R. Swan (Con)	W. Sharp (Con)	H. P. Humphris (Con)
September 1955	C. A. Earley (Con)	W. Sharp (Con)	H. P. Humphris (Con)
1956	C. A. Earley (Con)	W. Sharp (Con)	H. P. Humphris (Con)
1957	C. A. Earley (Con)	W. Sharp (Con)	H. P. Humphris (Con)
1958	C. A. Earley (Con)	W. Sharp (Con)	H. P. Humphris (Con)
1959	C. A. Earley (Con)	W. Sharp (Con)	H. P. Humphris (Con)
1960	H. Boff (Con)	W. Sharp (Con)	H. P. Humphris (Con)
1961	H. Boff (Con)	W. Sharp (Con)	H. P. Humphris (Con)
1962	H. Boff (Con)	T. Kay (Lib)	H. P. Humphris (Con)
1963	R. B. Davies (Lab)	T. Kay (Lib)	H. P. Humphris (Con)
1964	R. B. Davies (Lab)	T. Kay (Lib)	T. F. Lavin (Con)
1965	D. G. Massey (Con)	G. Robinson (Con)	T. F. Lavin (Con)
1966	D. G. Massey (Con)	G. Robinson (Con)	T. F. Lavin (Con)
1967	D. G. Massey (Con)	G. Robinson (Con)	T. F. Lavin (Con)
1968	D. G. Massey (Con)	G. Robinson (Con)	T. F. Lavin (Con)
1969	D. G. Massey (Con)	G. Robinson (Con)	T. F. Lavin (Con)
1970	D. G. Massey (Con)	G. Robinson (Con)	T. F. Lavin (Con)
1971	A. J. Spencer (Lab)	A. J. Bateman (Lab)	T. F. Lavin (Con)
1972	A. J. Spencer (Lab)	A. J. Bateman (Lab)	T. F. Lavin (Con)
1973	T. F. Lavin (Con)	D. G. Massey (Con)	T. E. Murphy (Con)
1975	T. F. Lavin (Con)	D. G. Massey (Con)	T. E. Murphy (Con)
1976	T. F. Lavin (Con)	W. H. Aikman (Con)	T. E. Murphy (Con)
1978	T. F. Lavin (Con)	W. H. Aikman (Con)	T. E. Murphy (Con)
1979	T. F. Lavin (Con)	W. H. Aikman (Con)	A. Home (Lab)
1980	T. F. Lavin (Con)	A. C. Thomas (Lab)	A. Home (Lab)
July 1981	T. F. Lavin (Con)	W. H. Aikman (Con)	A. Home (Lab)
1982	W. H. Aikman (Con)	G. W. G. Fitzsimons (Con)	P. Hilton (Con)
1983	W. H. Aikman (Con)	G. W. G. Fitzsimons (Con)	K. Bradley (Lab)
1984	W. H. Aikman (Con)	B. Harrison (Lab)	K. Bradley (Lab)
1986	A. H. Fender (Lab)	B. Harrison (Lab)	K. Bradley (Lab)
1987	A. H. Fender (Lab)	B. Harrison (Lab)	K. Bradley (Lab)
1988	A. H. Fender (Lab)	B. Harrison (Lab)	A. J. Spencer (Lab)
1990	A. H. Fender (Lab)	B. Harrison (Lab)	A. J. Spencer (Lab)
1991	A. H. Fender (Lab)	B. Harrison (Lab)	A. J. Spencer (Lab)
1992	A. H. Fender (Lab)	B. Harrison (Lab)	A. J. Spencer (Lab)
1994	A. H. Fender (Lab)	B. Harrison (Lab)	A. J. Spencer (Lab)
1995	A. H. Fender (Lab)	B. Harrison (Lab)	A. J. Spencer (Lab)
1996	A. H. Fender (Lab)	B. Harrison (Lab)	A. J. Spencer (Lab)
May 1997	A. H. Fender (Lab)	B. Harrison (Lab)	J. Smith (Lab)
1998	A. H. Fender (Lab)	B. Harrison (Lab)	J. Smith (Lab)
1999	A. H. Fender (Lab)	B. Harrison (Lab)	J. Smith (Lab)
2000	A. H. Fender (Lab)	B. Harrison (Lab)	J. Smith (Lab)
2002	A. H. Fender (Lab)	B. Harrison (Lab)	J. Smith (Lab)
2003	A. H. Fender (Lab)	B. Harrison (Lab)	J. Smith (Lab)
2004	Andrew Fender (Lab)	Jeff Smith (Lab)	Brian Harrison (Lab)
2006	Andrew Fender (Lab)	Jeff Smith (Lab)	Brian Harrison (Lab)
2007	Andrew Fender (Lab)	Jeff Smith (Lab)	Brian Harrison (Lab)
2008	Andrew Fender (Lab)	Jeff Smith (Lab)	Brian Harrison (Lab)
2010	Andrew Fender (Lab)	Jeff Smith (Lab)	Suzannah Reeves (Lab)
2011	Andrew Fender (Lab)	Jeff Smith (Lab)	Suzannah Reeves (Lab)
2012	Andrew Fender (Lab)	Jeff Smith (Lab)	Suzannah Reeves (Lab)
2014	Andrew Fender (Lab)	Jeff Smith (Lab)	Suzannah Reeves (Lab)
2015	Andrew Fender (Lab)	Garry Bridges (Lab)	Suzannah Reeves (Lab)
2015	Andrew Fender (Lab)	Garry Bridges (Lab)	Suzannah Reeves (Lab)
2018	Suzannah Reeves (Lab)	Gavin White (Lab)	Garry Bridges (Lab)
2019	Suzannah Reeves (Lab)	Gavin White (Lab)	Garry Bridges (Lab)
2021	Suzannah Reeves (Lab)	Gavin White (Lab)	Garry Bridges (Lab)
2022	Suzannah Reeves (Lab)	Gavin White (Lab)	Garry Bridges (Lab)
2023	Suzannah Reeves (Lab)	Gavin White (Lab)	Garry Bridges (Lab)
2024	Suzannah Reeves (Lab)	Gavin White (Lab)	Garry Bridges (Lab)
2026	Sam Easterby-Smith (Grn)	Gavin White (Lab)	Garry Bridges (Lab)

== Elections ==
=== Elections in 2020s ===
==== May 2026 ====
2026
Party	Candidate	Votes	%	±%
Green	Sam Easterby-Smith	1,829	48.6	+36.4
Labour	Suzannah Reeves*	1,189	31.6	−40.2
Reform	Kierin McCorkell	394	10.5	N/A
Liberal Democrats	Tracey Pook	209	5.6	−4.1
Conservative	Sarah Haynes	115	3.1	−2.7
SDP	Sebastian Moore	28	0.7	N/A
Majority		640	17.0	N/A
Turnout		3,764	34.0	+9.8
Green gain from Labour		Swing		

==== May 2024 ====
2024
Party	Candidate	Votes	%	±%
Labour	Gavin White*	2,078	63.8	8.6 ▼
Green	Laura Bannister	777	23.9	10.3 ▲
Liberal Democrats	Jon Martin	250	7.7	0.9 ▲
Conservative	Misbah Ahmed	116	3.6	2.6 ▼
Majority		1,301	40.0	
Rejected ballots		34	1.0	
Turnout		3,255	28.13	
Registered electors		11.572		
Labour hold		Swing	9.4 ▼	

==== May 2023 ====
2023
Party	Candidate	Votes	%	±%
Labour	Garry Bridges*	2,096	74.0	11.1▲
Green	Laura Bannister	436	15.4	1.4▼
Liberal Democrats	Jon Martin	192	6.8	7.0▼
Conservative	Ugo Nzeribe	109	3.8	1.4▼
Majority		1,660		
Rejected ballots		12		
Turnout			25.82	
Registered electors		11,017		
Labour hold		Swing		

==== May 2022 ====
2022
Party	Candidate	Votes	%	±%
Labour	Suzannah Reeves*	2,020	71.8	0.3 ▲
Green	Stace Wright	343	12.2	4.4 ▼
Liberal Democrats	Jon Martin	272	9.7	4.3 ▼
Conservative	Cillian Neil	162	5.8	0.5 ▼
Majority		1,677	59.6	
Rejected ballots		15		
Turnout		2,812	24.2	3.6 ▼
Registered electors		11,623		
Labour hold		Swing	2.4 ▲	

==== May 2021 ====
2021
Party	Candidate	Votes	%	±%
Labour	Gavin White*	2,568	72.4	3.6 ▲
Green	Stacey Wright	476	13.6	3.0 ▼
Liberal Democrats	Jon Martin	238	6.8	7.2 ▼
Conservative	Gary Wilkinson	218	6.2	0.3 ▼
Majority		2,092	59.8	
Rejected ballots		36	1.0	
Turnout		3,536	30.0	2.2 ▲
Registered electors		11,774		
Labour hold		Swing	3.3 ▲	

=== Elections in 2010s ===
==== May 2019 ====
2019
Party	Candidate	Votes	%	±%
Labour	Garry Bridges*	1,754	62.9	▼5.4
Green	Bonnie Boulton	468	16.8	▲0.2
Liberal Democrats	Jon Martin	386	13.8	▼0.2
Conservative	Tom Benbow	144	5.2	▼0.9
Majority		1,286	46.1	▼5.6
Rejected ballots		37	1.33	
Turnout		2,789	26.27	▼1.5
Registered electors		10,628		
Labour hold		Swing	▼2.8	

==== May 2018 ====
2018 (3 vacancies; new boundaries)
Party	Candidate	Votes	%	±%
Labour	Suzannah Reeves*	2,165	71.5	
Labour	Gavin White	2,086	68.8	
Labour	Garry Bridges*	2,071	68.3	
Green	Bonnie Boulton	502	16.6	
Liberal Democrats	Jon Martin	425	14.0	
Liberal Democrats	Brigitte Sapriel	363	12.0	
Liberal Democrats	Andrew McGuinness	359	11.8	
Conservative	Luke Dyks	191	6.3	
Conservative	Nicola Dixon	181	6.0	
Conservative	Michael Lister-Geddes	179	5.9	
Majority				
Turnout		3,030	27.8	
Labour win (new boundaries)				
Labour win (new boundaries)				
Labour win (new boundaries)				

==== May 2016 ====
2016
Party	Candidate	Votes	%	±%
Labour	Andrew Henryk Fender*	2,244	67.29	
Liberal Democrats	April Preston	561	16.82	
Green	Nathan Rae	329	9.87	
Conservative	Phillip Gallagher	138	4.14	
TUSC	Jane Elizabeth Lee	63	1.89	
Majority		1,683	50.46	
Turnout		3,335	31.85	
Labour hold		Swing		

==== May 2015 ====
2015
Party	Candidate	Votes	%	±%
Labour	Garry Paul Bridges	3,854	57.2	−8.5
Green	Glen Marsden	1,103	16.3	+5.9
Liberal Democrats	April Preston	949	14.1	+2.4
Conservative	Peter Jacques Werner	699	10.4	+1.4
TUSC	Jane E Lee	132	2.0	N/A
Majority		2,751	40.9	
Turnout		6,737	62.4	+30.4
Labour hold		Swing		

==== May 2014 ====
2014
Party	Candidate	Votes	%	±%
Labour	Suzannah Mary Reeves	1,924	56.91	
Green	Joel Smith	699	20.67	
Liberal Democrats	Christopher Kane	365	10.80	
Conservative	Peter Schofield	253	7.48	
TUSC	Jane Lee	107	3.16	
Motorcycle Alliance	James Gordon Torrance	33	0.98	
Majority		1,225	36.2	
Turnout		3,381	29.6	
Labour hold		Swing		

==== May 2012 ====
2012
Party	Candidate	Votes	%	±%
Labour	Andrew Fender*	1,822	74.1	+23.6
Green	Amy Howard	278	11.3	+3.6
Liberal Democrats	Nicholas Prescott	221	9.0	−25.4
Conservative	Nicholas Savage	139	5.7	−1.7
Majority		1,544	63	
Turnout		2,460	22	
Labour hold		Swing		

==== May 2011 ====
2011
Party	Candidate	Votes	%	±%
Labour	Jeffrey Smith*	2,311	65.7	+12.0
Liberal Democrats	Robert Mackle	413	11.7	−17.4
Green	Barney Wolfram	373	10.6	+1.7
Conservative	Luke Springthorpe	315	9.0	+0.6
Independent	Yasmin Zalzala	103	2.9	N/A
Majority		1,898	54.0	
Turnout		3,515	32.0	
Labour hold		Swing		

==== May 2010 ====
2010
Party	Candidate	Votes	%	±%
Labour	Suzannah Mary Reeves	2,531	43.8	−6.7
Liberal Democrats	Rob Mackle	2,216	38.3	+3.9
Conservative	Shaden Jaradat	489	8.5	+1.1
Green	Rowan William Smith	410	7.1	−0.6
Independent	Yasmin Zalzala	133	2.3	+2.3
Majority		315	5.5	−10.6
Turnout		5,779	54.6	+27.8
Labour hold		Swing	-5.3	

=== Elections in 2000s ===
==== May 2008 ====
2008
Party	Candidate	Votes	%	±%
Labour	Andrew Fender*	1,391	50.5	−3.2
Liberal Democrats	Sufiyan Rana	947	34.4	+5.3
Green	Lia Sims	213	7.7	−1.2
Conservative	Paul Lally	205	7.4	−1.0
Majority		444	16.1	−8.5
Turnout		2,756	26.8	+1.3
Labour hold		Swing	-4.2	

==== May 2007 ====
2007
Party	Candidate	Votes	%	±%
Labour	Jeffrey Smith*	1,382	53.7	−0.7
Liberal Democrats	Richard Wilson	748	29.1	+2.2
Green	Alice Coren	230	8.9	−2.1
Conservative	Andrew Perfect	215	8.4	+0.7
Majority		634	24.6	3.0
Turnout		2,575	25.5	−3.7
Labour hold		Swing	-1.4	

==== May 2006 ====
2006
Party	Candidate	Votes	%	±%
Labour	Brian Harrison*	1,567	54.4	+5.0
Liberal Democrats	Tina Maache	773	26.9	−0.4
Green	Robin-Ella Davies	317	11.0	−1.4
Conservative	Daniel Rossall Valentine	221	7.7	−3.2
Majority		794	27.6	+5.4
Turnout		2,878	29.2	−3.2
Labour hold		Swing	+2.7	

==== June 2004 ====
2004 (3 vacancies; new boundaries)
Party	Candidate	Votes	%	±%
Labour	Andrew Fender*	1,599	48.2	
Labour	Jeffrey Smith*	1,572	47.4	
Labour	Brian Harrison*	1,541	46.5	
Liberal Democrats	Enid Saunders	884	26.7	
Liberal Democrats	Shakeel Ahmad	881	26.6	
Liberal Democrats	John Reyes	865	26.1	
Green	Paul Dundon	403	12.2	
Green	Susan Fairweather	392	11.8	
Conservative	Nicholas Wilson	352	10.6	
Green	Steven Flower	335	10.1	
Majority		657	19.8	
Turnout		3,314	32.4	
Labour win (new seat)				
Labour win (new seat)				
Labour win (new seat)				

==== May 2003 ====
2003
Party	Candidate	Votes	%	±%
Labour	Jeffrey Smith*	1,322	46.5	−3.7
Liberal Democrats	Yasmin Zalzala	1,141	40.2	+1.3
Green	Brian Candeland	209	7.4	+1.8
Conservative	Gary Kaye	169	5.9	+0.6
Majority		181	6.4	−4.9
Turnout		2,841	22.5	−4.1
Labour hold		Swing	-2.5	

==== May 2002 ====
2002
Party	Candidate	Votes	%	±%
Labour	Andrew Fender*	1,746	50.2	+3.1
Liberal Democrats	Yasmin Zalzala	1,352	38.9	−4.8
Green	Brian Candeland	196	5.6	+2.4
Conservative	Elliot Gold	185	5.3	+1.0
Majority		394	11.3	+7.9
Turnout		3,479	26.6	+0.6
Labour hold		Swing	+3.9	

==== May 2000 ====
2000
Party	Candidate	Votes	%	±%
Labour	Brian Harrison*	1,523	47.1	−2.5
Liberal Democrats	Yasmin Zalzala	1,413	43.7	+2.7
Conservative	Graham Betton	139	4.3	−1.1
Green	Ernest Roberts	104	3.2	−0.9
Action for Better Local Education	Thomas Franklin	45	1.4	+1.4
Independent Labour	Kevin Robinson	10	0.3	+0.3
Majority		110	3.4	−5.2
Turnout		3,234	26.0	+0.4
Labour hold		Swing	-2.6	

=== Elections in 1990s ===
==== May 1999 ====
1999
Party	Candidate	Votes	%	±%
Labour	Jeffrey Smith*	1,603	49.6	−0.2
Liberal Democrats	Yasmin Zalzala	1,326	41.0	+4.2
Conservative	Lynda Whetton	173	5.4	−2.2
Green	Jonathan Rummery	131	4.1	−1.7
Majority		277	8.6	−4.4
Turnout		3,233	25.6	
Labour hold		Swing	-2.2	

==== May 1998 ====
1998
Party	Candidate	Votes	%	±%
Labour	Andrew Fender*	1,396	49.8	−17.2
Liberal Democrats	Yasmen Zalzala	1,031	36.8	+26.6
Conservative	Christopher Brown	213	7.6	−6.0
Green	Lucy Fogarty	163	5.8	−0.4
Majority		365	13.0	−40.4
Turnout		2,803		
Labour hold		Swing	-21.9	

==== May 1997 (by-election) ====
By-election: 2 May 1997
Party	Candidate	Votes	%	±%
Labour	Jeffrey Smith	3,790	51.9	−15.9
Liberal Democrats	Yasmin Zalzala	1,690	22.8	+12.6
Conservative	Christopher Brown	1,256	17.0	+3.3
Independent Labour	Michael Robinson	511	6.9	+6.9
Socialist Labour	Julie White	163	2.2	+2.2
Majority		2,100	29.1	−24.3
Turnout		7,410	61.6	
Labour hold		Swing	-14.2	

==== May 1996 ====
1996
Party	Candidate	Votes	%	±%
Labour	Brian Harrison*	2,126	67.0	−3.8
Conservative	Graham Betton	433	13.6	+2.0
Liberal Democrats	Yasmen Zalzala	324	10.2	−2.7
Green	Teresa Romagnuolo	196	6.2	+1.5
Socialist	J. White	94	3.0	+3.0
Majority		1,693	53.4	−4.6
Turnout		3,173		
Labour hold		Swing	-2.9	

==== May 1995 ====
1995
Party	Candidate	Votes	%	±%
Labour	Arnold Spencer*	2,325	70.8	+14.0
Liberal Democrats	Yasmen Zalzala	422	12.9	−7.8
Conservative	Graham Betton	381	11.6	−0.6
Green	Teresa Romagnuolo	154	4.7	+0.5
Majority		1,903	58.0	+21.9
Turnout		3,282		
Labour hold		Swing	+10.9	

==== May 1994 ====
1994
Party	Candidate	Votes	%	±%
Labour	A. Fender*	2,319	56.8	+5.5
Liberal Democrats	Y. Zalzala	845	20.7	+8.1
Conservative	K. Hussain	497	12.2	−18.5
Independent	M. Robinson	250	6.1	+6.1
Green	T. Romagnuolo	170	4.2	−1.2
Majority		1,474	36.1	+15.6
Turnout		4,081		
Labour hold		Swing	-1.3	

==== May 1992 ====
1992
Party	Candidate	Votes	%	±%
Labour	B. Harrison*	1,828	51.3	+2.6
Conservative	G. Betton	1,096	30.7	+0.0
Liberal Democrats	R. Johnston	450	12.6	−2.1
Green	S. Buchan	191	5.4	−0.5
Majority		732	20.5	+2.5
Turnout		3,565		
Labour hold		Swing	+1.3	

==== May 1991 ====
1991
Party	Candidate	Votes	%	±%
Labour	A. J. Spencer*	2,158	48.7	−7.6
Conservative	G. H. Betton	1,360	30.7	+7.6
Liberal Democrats	M. J. Sowemimo	651	14.7	+3.3
Green	J. G. Booty	260	5.9	−3.2
Majority		798	18.0	−15.2
Turnout		4,429	40.8	
Labour hold		Swing	-7.6	

==== May 1990 ====
1990
Party	Candidate	Votes	%	±%
Labour	A. Fender*	2,963	56.3	+11.4
Conservative	G. Shapps	1,218	23.1	+1.5
Liberal Democrats	S. A. Oliver	602	11.4	−11.5
Green	J. V. Lovell	479	9.1	+4.0
Majority		1,745	33.2	+11.2
Turnout		5,262		
Labour hold		Swing	+4.9	

=== Elections in 1980s ===
==== May 1988 ====
1988 (2 vacancies)
Party	Candidate	Votes	%	±%
Labour	B. Harrison*	2,793	44.9	+6.9
Labour	A. Spencer	2,570		
SLD	P. A. Monkhouse	1,428	22.9	−12.0
Conservative	J. F. Roberts	1,346	21.6	−3.4
Conservative	N. M. Watson	1,203		
SLD	M. E. D. Boyle	1,058		
SDP	B. Gaskin	332	5.3	+5.3
Green	S. J. Buchan	321	5.1	+3.0
Majority		1,142	22.0	+18.9
Turnout		6,220		
Labour hold		Swing		
Labour hold		Swing	+9.4	

==== May 1987 ====
1987
Party	Candidate	Votes	%	±%
Labour	Keith Bradley*	2,309	38.0	−13.0
Liberal	Anne Monkhouse	2,120	34.9	+11.6
Conservative	Maura Logan	1,523	25.1	+2.8
Green	Joyce Foster	127	2.1	−1.2
Majority		189	3.1	−24.6
Turnout		6,079		
Labour hold		Swing	-12.3	

==== May 1986 ====
1986
Party	Candidate	Votes	%	±%
Labour	A. Fender	2,790	51.0	−1.6
Liberal	A. Monkhouse	1,276	23.3	+10.5
Conservative	W. Aikman*	1,222	22.3	−12.3
Green	C. Kirby	181	3.3	+3.3
Majority		1,514	27.7	+9.7
Turnout		5,469		
Labour gain from Conservative		Swing	-6.0	

==== May 1984 ====
1984
Party	Candidate	Votes	%	±%
Labour	B. Harrison	2,732	52.6	+4.3
Conservative	Gerard Fitzsimons*	1,797	34.6	−2.2
Liberal	Richard Clayton	664	12.8	−2.1
Majority		935	18.0	+6.4
Turnout		5,193		
Labour gain from Conservative		Swing	+3.2	

==== May 1983 ====
1983
Party	Candidate	Votes	%	±%
Labour	Keith Bradley	2,359	48.3	+14.7
Conservative	Peter Hilton*	1,795	36.8	−5.0
Liberal	Richard Clayton	729	14.9	−9.7
Majority		564	11.6	+3.3
Turnout		4,883		
Labour gain from Conservative		Swing	+9.8	

==== May 1982 ====
1982 (3 vacancies; new boundaries)
Party	Candidate	Votes	%	±%
Conservative	William Aikman*	2,053	40.6	
Conservative	Gerard Fitzsimons	1,924	38.1	
Conservative	Peter Hilton	1,888	37.4	
Labour	Trevor Allcock	1,649	32.6	
Labour	Deborah Bryson	1,520	30.1	
Labour	Roy Walters	1,493	29.6	
Liberal	Pamela Elwood	1,213	24.0	
Liberal	Anthony Parkinson	1,199	23.7	
Liberal	John Stevenson	1,148	22.7	
Majority		239	4.7	
Turnout		5,052	45.0	
Conservative win (new seat)				
Conservative win (new seat)				
Conservative win (new seat)				

==== July 1981 (by-election) ====
By-election: 9 July 1981
Party	Candidate	Votes	%	±%
Conservative	William Aikman	1,198	37.9	+0.6
Labour	Paula Sadler	1,104	34.9	−9.1
Liberal	Colin Dowse	860	27.2	+8.5
Majority		94	3.0	−3.6
Turnout		3,162	32.0	−10.1
Conservative gain from Labour		Swing	+4.8	

==== May 1980 ====
1980
Party	Candidate	Votes	%	±%
Labour	A. C. Thomas	1,827	44.0	+2.6
Conservative	W. H. Aikman*	1,551	37.3	−2.4
Liberal	C. Adamson	776	18.7	−0.2
Majority		276	6.6	+4.9
Turnout		4,154	42.1	−30.4
Labour gain from Conservative		Swing	+2.5	

=== Elections in 1970s ===
==== May 1979 ====
1979
Party	Candidate	Votes	%	±%
Labour	A. Home	2,850	41.4	+1.9
Conservative	T. E. Murphy*	2,735	39.7	−19.0
Liberal	G. J. Corps	1,299	18.9	+18.9
Majority		115	1.7	−17.5
Turnout		6,884	72.5	+33.8
Labour gain from Conservative		Swing	+10.4	

==== May 1978 ====
1978
Party	Candidate	Votes	%	±%
Conservative	T. F. Lavin*	2,314	58.7	+6.1
Labour	S. Jean	1,558	39.5	+2.2
Communist	N. J. Gilroy	73	1.9	−0.0
Majority		756	19.2	+3.9
Turnout		3,945	38.7	
Conservative hold		Swing	+1.9	

==== May 1976 ====
1976
Party	Candidate	Votes	%	±%
Conservative	W. H. Aikman	2,346	52.6	−5.0
Labour	A. H. Fender	1,664	37.3	+8.7
Liberal	A. A. Parr	316	7.1	−6.7
Communist	D. J. Granfield	85	1.9	+1.9
Independent	P. S. Pinder	52	1.2	+1.2
Majority		682	15.3	−13.8
Turnout		4,463		
Conservative hold		Swing	-6.8	

==== May 1975 ====
1975
Party	Candidate	Votes	%	±%
Conservative	T. E. Murphy*	2,232	57.6	−6.3
Labour	P. Bednarski	1,106	28.6	−7.4
Liberal	A. A. Parr	534	13.8	+13.8
Majority		1,126	29.1	+1.1
Turnout		3,872		
Conservative hold		Swing	+0.5	

==== May 1973 ====
1973 (3 vacancies; reorganisation)
Party	Candidate	Votes	%	±%
Conservative	T. F. Lavin*	2,479	62.8	+7.7
Conservative	D. G. Massey	2,319	58.7	+3.6
Conservative	T. E. Murphy	2,262	57.3	+2.2
Labour	E. Richards	1,395	35.3	−9.6
Labour	A. J. Spencer*	1,392	35.2	−9.7
Labour	A. E. Jones	1,368	34.6	−10.3
Majority		867	21.9	+11.7
Turnout		3,950		
Conservative hold		Swing		
Conservative gain from Labour		Swing		
Conservative gain from Labour		Swing		

==== May 1972 ====
1972
Party	Candidate	Votes	%	±%
Conservative	T. F. Lavin*	2,371	55.1	+6.5
Labour	K. J. Hill	1,930	44.9	−5.5
Majority		441	10.2	+10.2
Turnout		4,301		
Conservative hold		Swing		

==== May 1971 ====
1971 (3 vacancies; new boundaries)
Party	Candidate	Votes	%	±%
Labour	A. J. Spencer	2,470	50.4	
Labour	A. J. Bateman	2,385	48.7	
Conservative	T. F. Lavin*	2,381	48.6	
Labour	A. P. Marino	2,380	48.6	
Conservative	G. Robinson	2,292	46.8	
Conservative	D. G. Massey	2,284	46.6	
Residents	D. R. Brown	337	6,9	
Communist	D. Maher	177	3.6	
Majority		1	0.0	
Turnout		4,902		
Labour win (new seat)				
Labour win (new seat)				
Conservative win (new seat)				

==== May 1970 ====
1970
Party	Candidate	Votes	%	±%
Conservative	T. F. Lavin	2,326	58.5	−15.9
Labour	A. Roberts	1,651	41.5	+15.9
Majority		675	17.0	−31.8
Turnout		3,977		
Conservative hold		Swing		

=== Elections in 1960s ===
==== May 1969 ====
1969
Party	Candidate	Votes	%	±%
Conservative	D. G. Massey*	2,370	74.4	+5.8
Labour	A. Holland	815	25.6	+3.1
Majority		1,555	48.8	+2.7
Turnout		3,185		
Conservative hold		Swing		

==== May 1968 ====
1968
Party	Candidate	Votes	%	±%
Conservative	G. Robinson*	2,527	68.6	+8.9
Labour	R. K. Litherland	830	22.5	−7.6
Liberal	A. Burns	326	8.9	−1.3
Majority		1,697	46.1	+16.5
Turnout		3,683		
Conservative hold		Swing		

==== May 1967 ====
1967
Party	Candidate	Votes	%	±%
Conservative	T. F. Lavin*	1,966	59.7	+10.1
Labour	K. Roberts	992	30.1	−8.1
Liberal	A. Burns	334	10.2	−2.0
Majority		974	29.6	+18.2
Turnout		3,292		
Conservative hold		Swing		

==== May 1966 ====
1966
Party	Candidate	Votes	%	±%
Conservative	D. G. Massey*	1,921	49.6	+0.2
Labour	K. Roberts	1,480	38.2	+11.3
Liberal	A. Burns	473	12.2	−15.7
Majority		441	11.4	−7.9
Turnout		3,874		
Conservative hold		Swing		

==== May 1965 ====
1965 (2 vacancies)
Party	Candidate	Votes	%	±%
Conservative	G. Robinson	2,417	49.4	+12.7
Conservative	D. G. Massey	2,307	47.2	+10.5
Liberal	T. Kay*	1,362	27.9	−0.5
Labour	E. Wood	1,317	26.9	−8.0
Labour	D. Healey	1,307	26.7	−8.2
Liberal	T. A. Maher	1,069	21.9	−6.5
Majority		945	19.3	+17.5
Turnout		4,890		
Conservative gain from Liberal		Swing		
Conservative gain from Labour		Swing		

==== May 1964 ====
1964
Party	Candidate	Votes	%	±%
Conservative	T. F. Lavin	1,674	36.7	+3.8
Labour	E. Wood	1,591	34.9	+1.0
Liberal	A. Yates	1,294	28.4	−5.2
Majority		83	1.8	
Turnout		4,559		
Conservative hold		Swing		

==== May 1963 ====
1963
Party	Candidate	Votes	%	±%
Labour	R. B. Davies	1,363	33.9	+12.3
Liberal	A. Yates	1,353	33.6	−8.3
Conservative	H. Boff*	1,305	32.5	−4.0
Majority		10	0.3	
Turnout		4,021		
Labour gain from Conservative		Swing		

==== May 1962 ====
1962
Party	Candidate	Votes	%	±%
Liberal	T. Kay	1,793	41.9	+4.2
Conservative	W. Sharp*	1,560	36.5	−6.9
Labour	R. B. Davies	924	21.6	+2.7
Majority		233	5.4	
Turnout		4,277		
Liberal gain from Conservative		Swing		

==== May 1961 ====
1961
Party	Candidate	Votes	%	±%
Conservative	H. P. Humphris*	1,485	43.4	−8.6
Liberal	T. Kay	1,289	37.7	+6.4
Labour	F. W. Blaine	645	18.9	+2.1
Majority		196	5.7	−15.0
Turnout		3,419		
Conservative hold		Swing		

==== May 1960 ====
1960
Party	Candidate	Votes	%	±%
Conservative	H. Boff	1,652	52.0	+1.0
Liberal	T. Kay	994	31.3	+9.9
Labour	F. Vince	533	16.8	−10.8
Majority		658	20.7	−2.7
Turnout		3,179		
Conservative hold		Swing		

=== Elections in 1950s ===
==== May 1959 ====
1959
Party	Candidate	Votes	%	±%
Conservative	W. Sharp*	2,119	51.0	+3.9
Labour	R. P. Greenwood	1,145	27.6	−9.6
Liberal	P. McGregor	890	21.4	+5.7
Majority		974	23.4	+13.5
Turnout		4,154		
Conservative hold		Swing		

==== May 1958 ====
1958
Party	Candidate	Votes	%	±%
Conservative	H. P. Humphris*	1,767	47.1	−3.1
Labour	K. Edwards	1,397	37.2	+3.3
Liberal	R. H. Hargreaves	591	15.7	−0.2
Majority		370	9.9	−6.4
Turnout		3,755		
Conservative hold		Swing		

==== May 1957 ====
1957
Party	Candidate	Votes	%	±%
Conservative	C. A. Earley*	1,832	50.2	−6.1
Labour	H. Conway	1,237	33.9	+5.8
Liberal	R. H. Hargreaves	584	15.9	+0.3
Majority		595	16.3	−11.9
Turnout		3,653		
Conservative hold		Swing		

==== May 1956 ====
1956
Party	Candidate	Votes	%	±%
Conservative	W. Sharp*	1,950	56.3	−13.6
Labour	E. H. Jessop	974	28.1	−2.1
Liberal	R. H. Hargreaves	543	15.6	N/A
Majority		976	28.2	−11.4
Turnout		3,467		
Conservative hold		Swing		

==== September 1955 (by-election) ====
By-election: 22 September 1955
Party	Candidate	Votes	%	±%
Conservative	C. A. Earley	1,971	58.7	−11.1
Labour	G. Halstead	887	26.4	−3.8
Liberal	R. H. Hargreaves	502	14.9	N/A
Majority		1,084	32.3	−7.3
Turnout		3,360		
Conservative hold		Swing		

==== May 1955 ====
1955
Party	Candidate	Votes	%	±%
Conservative	H. P. Humphris*	2,980	69.8	+6.5
Labour	G. Halstead	1,287	30.2	−6.5
Majority		1,693	39.6	+13.0
Turnout		4,267		
Conservative hold		Swing		

==== May 1954 ====
1954
Party	Candidate	Votes	%	±%
Conservative	W. R. Swan*	2,983	63.3	−0.3
Labour	E. V. Hughes	1,731	36.7	+0.3
Majority		1,252	26.6	−0.6
Turnout		4,713		
Conservative hold		Swing		

==== May 1953 ====
1953
Party	Candidate	Votes	%	±%
Conservative	W. Sharp*	3,366	63.6	+5.8
Labour	W. A. Dove	1,928	36.4	−5.8
Majority		1,438	27.2	+11.6
Turnout		5,294		
Conservative hold		Swing		

==== May 1952 ====
1952
Party	Candidate	Votes	%	±%
Conservative	H. P. Humphris*	3,250	57.8	−12.4
Labour	W. A. Dove	2,369	42.2	+12.4
Majority		881	15.6	−24.8
Turnout		5,619		
Conservative hold		Swing		

==== May 1951 ====
1951
Party	Candidate	Votes	%	±%
Conservative	W. R. Swan	3,601	70.2	+9.6
Labour	W. M. Parkinson	1,531	29.8	−9.6
Majority		2,070	40.4	+19.2
Turnout		5,132		
Conservative hold		Swing		

==== May 1950 ====
1950
Party	Candidate	Votes	%	±%
Conservative	W. Sharp	3,128	60.6	
Labour	W. M. Parkinson	2,031	39.4	
Majority		1,097	21.2	
Turnout		5,159		
Conservative hold		Swing		

== See also ==
- Manchester City Council
- Manchester City Council elections
