= 1990 Manchester City Council election =

1990 UK local government election

- 3 May 1990

34 of 99 seats to Manchester City Council 50 seats needed for a majority
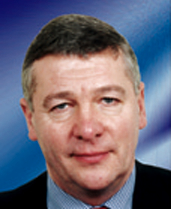
	First party	Second party	Third party
Leader	Graham Stringer	Peter Hilton	Keith Whitmore
Party	Labour	Conservative	Liberal Democrats
Leader's seat	Harpurhey	Didsbury	Levenshulme
Last election	34 seats, 53.1%	2 seats, 28.3%	2 seats, 15.2%
Seats before	78	10	8
Seats won	31	1	2
Seats after	78	10	8
Seat change	Steady	Steady	Steady
Popular vote	78,490	25,875	20,026
Percentage	58.6%	19.3%	14.9%
Swing	▲5.5%	▼9.0%	▼0.3%
	Fourth party	Fifth party
Leader	Anne Carroll	Audrey Greaves
Party	Ind. Conservative	Liberal
Leader's seat	Northenden	Levenshulme
Last election	did not contest	did not contest
Seats before	2	1
Seats won	0	0
Seats after	2	1
Seat change	Steady	Steady
Popular vote	0	0
Percentage	0.0%	0.0%
Swing	N/A	N/A
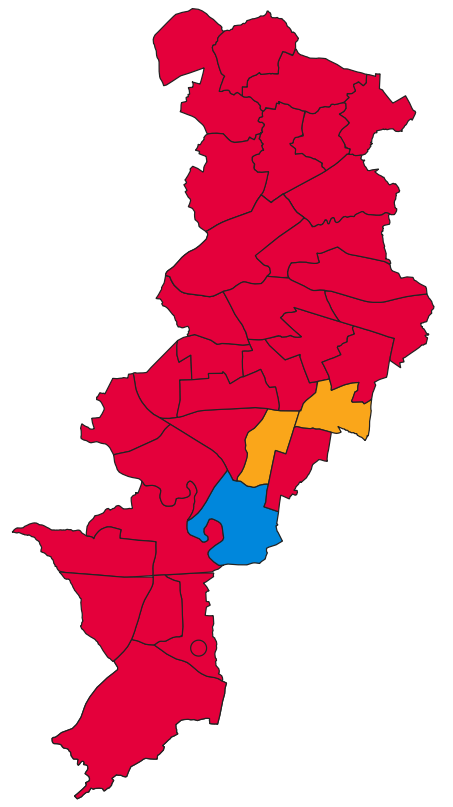
- Map of results of 1990 election
Leader of the Council before election
Graham Stringer
Labour
Leader of the Council after election
Graham Stringer
Labour

Elections to Manchester City Council were held on Thursday, 3 May 1990. One third of the council was up for election, with each successful candidate to serve a four-year term of office, expiring in 1994. The Labour Party retained overall control of the Council.

== Election result ==
Party	Votes		Seats			Full Council	
Labour Party	78,490 (58.6%)	▲5.5	31 (91.2%)	31 / 34	Steady	78 (78.8%)	78 / 99
Conservative Party	25,875 (19.3%)	▼9.0	1 (2.9%)	1 / 34	Steady	10 (10.1%)	10 / 99
Liberal Democrats	20,026 (14.9%)	▼0.3	2 (5.9%)	2 / 34	Steady	8 (8.1%)	8 / 99
Independent Conservative	0 (0.0%)	N/A	0 (0.0%)	0 / 34	Steady	2 (2.0%)	2 / 99
Liberal	0 (0.0%)	N/A	0 (0.0%)	0 / 34	Steady	1 (1.0%)	1 / 99
Green Party	8,903 (6.6%)	▲4.5	0 (0.0%)	0 / 34	Steady	0 (0.0%)	0 / 99
Independent	531 (0.4%)	▲0.1	0 (0.0%)	0 / 34	Steady	0 (0.0%)	0 / 99

↓
78	8	1	2	10

== Ward results ==
=== Ardwick ===
Ardwick
Party	Candidate	Votes	%	±%
Labour	H. Barrett*	2,034	78.7	−0.1
Conservative	V. M. Colledge	227	8.8	−3.4
Green	D. A. Howarth	173	6.7	+3.8
Liberal Democrats	R. A. J. Axtell	149	5.8	−0.3
Majority		1,807	70.0	+3.4
Turnout		2,583		
Labour hold		Swing	+1.6	

=== Baguley ===
Baguley
Party	Candidate	Votes	%	±%
Labour	J. McNicholls*	2,494	63.2	+5.6
Conservative	V. C. Kirby	889	22.5	−12.6
Liberal Democrats	G. Hall	297	7.5	+0.2
Independent	C. Buller	154	3.9	+3.9
Green	M. G. Abdullah	111	2.8	+2.8
Majority		1,605	40.7	+18.2
Turnout		3,945		
Labour hold		Swing	+9.1	

=== Barlow Moor ===
Barlow Moor
Party	Candidate	Votes	%	±%
Labour	A. Maloney	1,874	42.3	+5.0
Liberal Democrats	S. D. Wheale	1,573	35.5	+7.5
Conservative	D. A. Clover	701	15.8	−11.7
Green	J. Booty	284	6.4	−0.7
Majority		301	6.8	−2.5
Turnout		4,432		
Labour hold		Swing	-1.2	

=== Benchill ===
Benchill
Party	Candidate	Votes	%	±%
Labour	D. Lunts	2,147	71.9	+11.9
Independent	D. A. Morris	327	10.9	−5.8
Conservative	L. G. Maguire	213	7.1	−2.1
Liberal Democrats	A. Bradshaw	204	6.8	−7.3
Green	H. F. Bramwell	96	3.2	+3.2
Majority		1,820	60.9	+17.6
Turnout		2,987		
Labour hold		Swing	+8.8	

=== Beswick and Clayton ===
Beswick and Clayton
Party	Candidate	Votes	%	±%
Labour	W. Egerton*	2,480	79.6	+4.6
Conservative	M. D. Payne	324	10.4	−8.7
Liberal Democrats	V. M. Muir	202	6.5	+0.6
Green	K. M. Castle	109	3.5	+3.5
Majority		2,156	69.2	+25.6
Turnout		3,115		
Labour hold		Swing	+6.6	

=== Blackley ===
Blackley
Party	Candidate	Votes	%	±%
Labour	G. Chadwick*	2,497	66.7	+5.6
Conservative	K. A. Potter	788	21.1	−8.7
Liberal Democrats	V. Towers	262	7.0	−2.1
Green	B. A. Lewis	195	5.2	+5.2
Majority		1,709	45.7	+14.4
Turnout		3,742		
Labour hold		Swing	+7.1	

=== Bradford ===
Bradford
Party	Candidate	Votes	%	±%
Labour	J. Gilmore*	2,299	78.1	+5.3
Conservative	K. Hyde	347	11.8	−7.4
Liberal Democrats	I. C. Donaldson	196	6.7	−1.3
Green	A. H. Kahan	100	3.4	+3.4
Majority		1,952	66.3	+12.8
Turnout		2,942		
Labour hold		Swing	+6.3	

=== Brooklands ===
Brooklands
Party	Candidate	Votes	%	±%
Labour	G. Collier	2,263	50.9	+8.6
Conservative	A. T. Langan	1,712	38.5	−12.1
Liberal Democrats	A. B. Quinlan	316	7.1	−0.0
Green	C. S. Field	159	3.6	+3.6
Majority		551	12.4	+4.1
Turnout		4,450		
Labour hold		Swing	+10.3	

=== Burnage ===
Burnage
Party	Candidate	Votes	%	±%
Labour	R. Whyte*	2,481	53.5	+3.8
Conservative	M. Logan	1,345	29.0	−10.0
Liberal Democrats	S. W. Lawley	559	12.1	+2.7
Green	J. Foster	250	5.4	+3.5
Majority		1,136	24.5	+13.9
Turnout		4,635		
Labour hold		Swing	+6.9	

=== Central ===
Central
Party	Candidate	Votes	%	±%
Labour	T. Findlow*	1,681	79.7	−0.9
Conservative	A. E. W. Hudson	192	9.1	−4.2
Green	T. K. Stringer	125	5.9	−0.2
Liberal Democrats	C. Muir	110	5.2	+5.2
Majority		1,489	70.6	+3.2
Turnout		2,108		
Labour hold		Swing	+1.6	

=== Charlestown ===
Charlestown
Party	Candidate	Votes	%	±%
Labour	S. McCardell*	2,545	63.7	+6.3
Conservative	M. R. Birnhak	912	22.8	−11.5
Liberal Democrats	J. Laslett	320	8.0	+4.3
Green	M. A. Burns	220	5.5	+5.5
Majority		1,633	40.9	+17.8
Turnout		3,997		
Labour hold		Swing	+8.9	

=== Cheetham ===
Cheetham
Party	Candidate	Votes	%	±%
Labour	M. Pagel	2,460	81.5	+3.4
Liberal Democrats	S. A. Lewis	560	18.5	+10.8
Majority		1,900	62.9	−0.9
Turnout		3,020		
Labour hold		Swing	-3.7	

=== Chorlton ===
Chorlton
Party	Candidate	Votes	%	±%
Labour	D. Black*	2,897	52.2	+8.7
Conservative	W. I. Bradshaw	1,728	31.1	−11.8
Green	B. Candeland	588	10.6	+6.9
Liberal Democrats	H. D. McKay	339	6.1	−1.5
Majority		1,169	21.1	+20.5
Turnout		5,552		
Labour hold		Swing	+10.2	

=== Crumpsall ===
Crumpsall
Party	Candidate	Votes	%	±%
Labour	A. Spinks	2,151	50.9	+3.3
Conservative	A. E. Walsh	1,526	36.1	−9.8
Green	P. R. Lewis	295	7.0	+7.0
Liberal Democrats	D. I. Gordon	250	5.9	−0.6
Majority		625	14.8	+13.1
Turnout		4,222		
Labour hold		Swing	+6.5	

=== Didsbury ===
Didsbury
Party	Candidate	Votes	%	±%
Conservative	J. Hill*	2,868	47.0	−6.9
Labour	G. Bridson	2,382	39.0	+8.0
Liberal Democrats	E. Allen	514	8.4	−3.7
Green	M. J. Daw	337	5.5	+2.2
Majority		486	8.0	−15.0
Turnout		6,101		
Conservative hold		Swing	-7.4	

=== Fallowfield ===
Fallowfield
Party	Candidate	Votes	%	±%
Labour	P. Morrison*	2,440	58.4	+7.4
Conservative	D. Smith	830	19.9	−9.1
Green	B. J. A. Doherty	524	12.5	+7.9
Liberal Democrats	R. G. Brown	386	9.2	+4.6
Majority		1,610	38.5	+16.6
Turnout		4,180		
Labour hold		Swing	+8.2	

=== Gorton North ===
Gorton North
Party	Candidate	Votes	%	±%
Labour	C. Brierley*	2,505	48.9	+2.6
Liberal Democrats	J. Pearcey	2,140	41.8	+1.3
Conservative	C. H. T. Webb	351	6.8	−6.5
Green	B. Kellett	129	2.5	+2.5
Majority		365	7.1	+1.3
Turnout		5,125		
Labour hold		Swing	+0.6	

=== Gorton South ===
Gorton South
Party	Candidate	Votes	%	±%
Labour	D. Barker*	2,371	54.1	+5.2
Liberal Democrats	J. Bridges	1,462	33.3	−8.9
Conservative	A. M. Simm	376	8.6	−0.3
Green	D. E. Barnes	177	4.0	+4.0
Majority		909	20.7	+14.0
Turnout		4,386		
Labour hold		Swing	+5.5	

=== Harpurhey ===
Harpurhey
Party	Candidate	Votes	%	±%
Labour	Patrick Karney*	2,202	69.8	+0.7
Conservative	D. H. Keller	526	16.7	−6.9
Liberal Democrats	N. Towers	275	8.7	+1.4
Green	M. J. Clark	150	4.8	+4.8
Majority		1,676	53.2	+7.7
Turnout		3,153		
Labour hold		Swing	+3.8	

=== Hulme ===
Hulme
Party	Candidate	Votes	%	±%
Labour	M. Hood	1,629	72.4	+1.5
Green	P. E. Harrison	350	15.6	−0.2
Conservative	P. W. Davies	154	6.8	+0.0
Liberal Democrats	J. Mark	117	5.2	−1.2
Majority		1,279	56.8	+1.7
Turnout		2,250		
Labour hold		Swing	+0.8	

=== Levenshulme ===
Levenshulme
Party	Candidate	Votes	%	±%
Liberal Democrats	Keith Whitmore*	2,918	55.0	+13.8
Labour	C. M. R. Rogers	1,794	33.8	−3.0
Green	P. N. Thompson	303	5.7	+2.2
Conservative	R. Colledge	293	5.5	−13.1
Majority		1,124	21.2	+16.8
Turnout		5,308		
Liberal Democrats hold		Swing	+8.4	

=== Lightbowne ===
Lightbowne
Party	Candidate	Votes	%	±%
Labour	K. Franklin*	2,927	65.4	+14.6
Conservative	A. G. Edwardson	832	18.6	−19.7
Liberal Democrats	D. Porter	489	10.9	+1.5
Green	G. F. Carter	226	5.1	+3.6
Majority		2,095	46.8	+34.3
Turnout		4,474		
Labour hold		Swing	+17.1	

=== Longsight ===
Longsight
Party	Candidate	Votes	%	±%
Labour	N. K. Moghal*	2,701	64.2	−4.1
Conservative	S. Hussain	619	14.7	+0.8
Green	J. E. Denham	607	14.4	+9.3
Liberal Democrats	B. I. Pierce	279	6.6	−6.1
Majority		2,082	49.5	−4.9
Turnout		4,206		
Labour hold		Swing	-2.4	

=== Moss Side ===
Moss Side
Party	Candidate	Votes	%	±%
Labour	I. S. Sram	2,567	73.9	−1.5
Conservative	M. Barnes	331	9.5	−5.4
Green	J. Sturrock	317	9.1	+5.6
Liberal Democrats	M. T. Rowles	209	6.0	−0.2
Independent	J. Shaoul	50	1.4	+1.4
Majority		2,236	64.4	+3.9
Turnout		3,474		
Labour hold		Swing	+1.9	

=== Moston ===
Moston
Party	Candidate	Votes	%	±%
Labour	D. Shaw	2,752	57.0	+7.0
Conservative	F. Frost	1,535	31.8	−11.0
Liberal Democrats	E. L. B. Slater	356	7.4	+0.2
Green	S. G. Rawlins	182	3.8	+3.8
Majority		1,217	25.2	+18.1
Turnout		4,825		
Labour hold		Swing	+9.0	

=== Newton Heath ===
Newton Heath
Party	Candidate	Votes	%	±%
Labour	A. F. Garside*	2,753	77.0	+3.0
Conservative	R. J. Merrin	453	12.7	−7.0
Liberal Democrats	C. W. Turner	208	5.8	−0.5
Green	M. B. Bold	162	4.5	+4.5
Majority		2,300	64.3	+10.0
Turnout		3,576		
Labour hold		Swing	+5.0	

=== Northenden ===
Northenden
Party	Candidate	Votes	%	±%
Labour	G. Carroll	2,614	55.7	+6.0
Conservative	J. D. Robertson	1,577	33.6	−7.4
Liberal Democrats	R. K. Higginson	316	6.7	−1.4
Green	G. Otten	185	3.9	+2.7
Majority		1,037	22.1	+13.3
Turnout		4,692		
Labour hold		Swing	+6.7	

=== Old Moat ===
Old Moat
Party	Candidate	Votes	%	±%
Labour	A. Fender*	2,963	56.3	+11.4
Conservative	G. Shapps	1,218	23.1	+1.5
Liberal Democrats	S. A. Oliver	602	11.4	−11.5
Green	J. V. Lovell	479	9.1	+4.0
Majority		1,745	33.2	+11.2
Turnout		5,262		
Labour hold		Swing	+4.9	

=== Rusholme ===
Rusholme
Party	Candidate	Votes	%	±%
Labour	J. Byrne*	2,532	64.7	+20.9
Liberal Democrats	C. A. James	769	19.6	−15.7
Green	B. S. Bingham	614	15.7	+10.0
Majority		1,763	45.0	+36.5
Turnout		3,915		
Labour hold		Swing	+18.3	

=== Sharston ===
Sharston (2 vacancies)
Party	Candidate	Votes	%	±%
Labour	J. Broderick	2,258	54.1	+1.3
Labour	G. A. M. Wright	2,159		
Conservative	C. Roberts	839	20.1	−8.7
Conservative	T. J. Roberts	808		
Green	G. A. Lawson	539	12.9	+12.9
Liberal Democrats	H. Griffiths	536	12.8	−5.6
Liberal Democrats	D. W. Fake	355		
Majority		1,320	34.0	+10.0
Turnout		4,172		
Labour hold		Swing		
Labour hold		Swing	+5.0	

=== Whalley Range ===
Whalley Range
Party	Candidate	Votes	%	±%
Labour	J. C. Morris*	2,430	54.1	+6.8
Conservative	L. Houston	1,445	32.2	−8.1
Green	C. I. Kirby	334	7.4	+3.7
Liberal Democrats	B. Jones	282	6.3	+0.7
Majority		985	21.9	+14.9
Turnout		4,491		
Labour hold		Swing	+7.4	

=== Withington ===
Withington
Party	Candidate	Votes	%	±%
Liberal Democrats	A. Jones*	2,251	43.4	+4.0
Labour	G. P. Ballance	1,892	36.5	+4.6
Conservative	G. H. R. Betton	724	14.0	−14.7
Green	B. J. Ekbery	319	6.2	+6.2
Majority		359	6.9	−0.7
Turnout		5,186		
Liberal Democrats hold		Swing	-0.3	

=== Woodhouse Park ===
Woodhouse Park
Party	Candidate	Votes	%	±%
Labour	M. Ainsworth	2,475	74.6	+5.0
Liberal Democrats	D. A. Wraxall	580	17.5	+17.5
Green	H. L. Murray	264	8.0	+8.0
Majority		1,895	57.1	+2.8
Turnout		3,319		
Labour hold		Swing	-6.2	

== By-elections between 1990 and 1991 ==
=== Lightbowne, 27 September 1990 ===
Caused by the resignation of Councillor Gerry Carey (Independent Conservative, Lightbowne, elected 7 May 1987) on 6 August 1990.

Lightbowne
Party	Candidate	Votes	%	±%
Labour	C. M. Inchbold	1,532	55.7	−9.7
Conservative	D. Shaw	874	31.8	+13.2
Green	G. F. Carter	174	6.3	+1.2
Liberal Democrats	C. Turner	170	6.2	−4.7
Majority		658	23.9	−22.9
Turnout		2,750		
Labour gain from Ind. Conservative		Swing		
