= Jeff Smith (British politician) =

British Labour politician

Jeff Smith MP
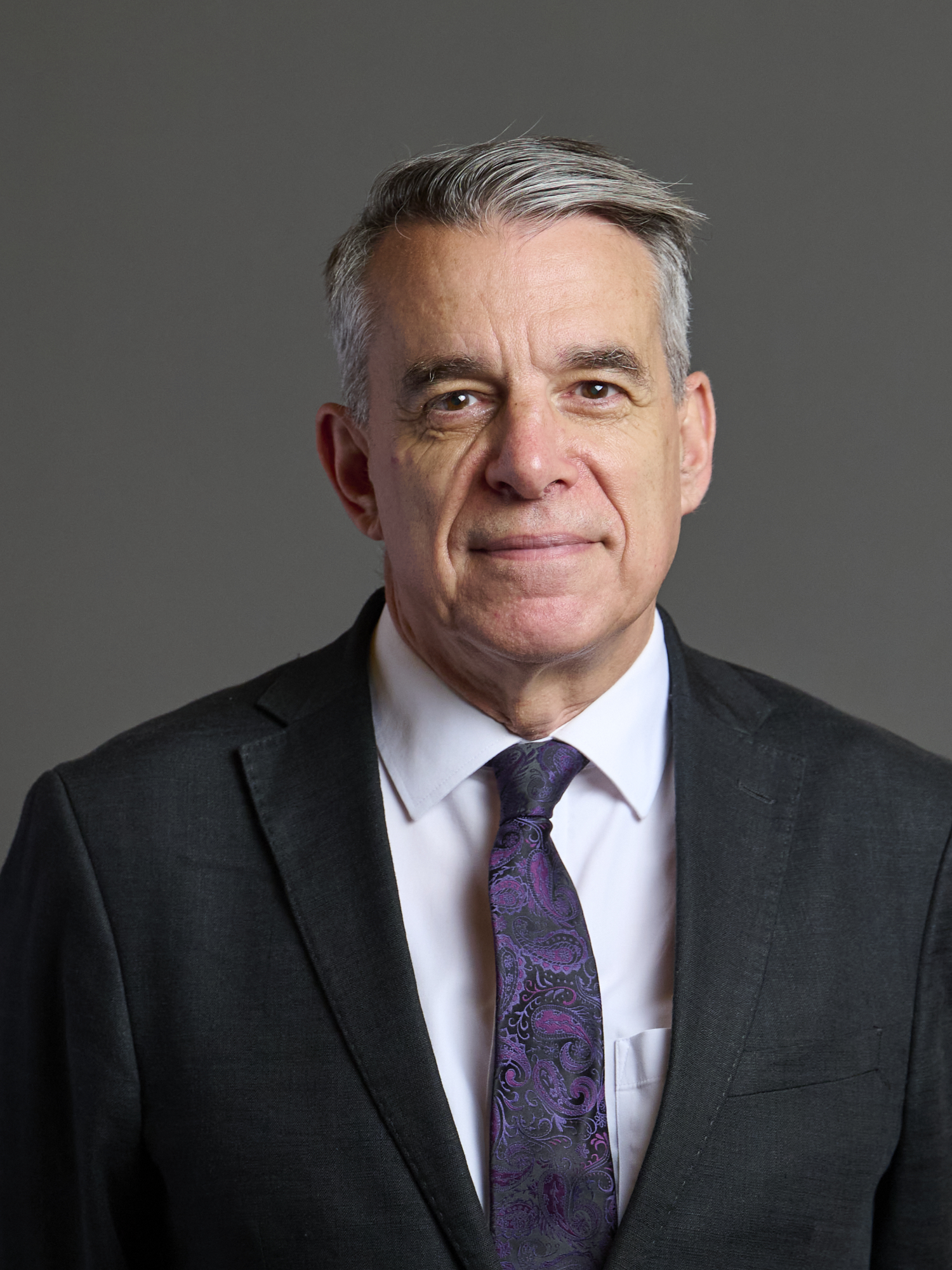
- Official portrait, 2024

Lord Commissioner of the Treasury
- In office 10 July 2024 – 7 September 2025
- Prime Minister: Keir Starmer
Shadow Ministerial Roles
Senior Opposition Whip
In office December 2023 – 5 July 2024
Leader	Keir Starmer
Shadow Minister for Clean Power and Consumers
In office 5 September 2023 – 5 July 2024
Leader	Keir Starmer
Preceded by	Seema Malhotra (Consumers)
Shadow Minister for Sport, Tourism, Heritage and Music
In office 4 December 2021 – 5 September 2023
Leader	Keir Starmer
Preceded by	Alison McGovern (Sport); Alex Sobel (Tourism & Heritage)
Succeeded by	Lilian Greenwood (Heritage); Barbara Keeley (Music and Tourism); Stephanie Peacock (Sport)
Shadow Minister for Local Government
In office 14 May 2021 – 4 December 2021
Leader	Keir Starmer
Preceded by	Kate Hollern
Succeeded by	Mike Amesbury
Shadow Lord Commissioner of HM Household
In office 18 September 2015 – 14 May 2021
Leader	Jeremy Corbyn; Keir Starmer
Preceded by	Position Established
Succeeded by

Member of Parliament for Manchester Withington
- Incumbent
- Assumed office 7 May 2015
- Preceded by: John Leech
- Majority: 13,982 (33.5%)

Member of Manchester City Council for Old Moat
- In office 1997–2015
- Succeeded by: Garry Bridges

Personal details
- Born: 26 January 1963 (age 63) Withington, Lancashire, England
- Party: Labour
- Education: University of Manchester
- Website: Official website

Jeff Smith (born 26 January 1963) is a British Labour Party politician serving as the Member of Parliament (MP) for Manchester Withington since 2015.

== Early life and career ==
Smith was a pupil at the private Manchester Grammar School, and graduated from the University of Manchester with a degree in Politics and Economics in 1984.

A former councillor for Old Moat ward on Manchester City Council from 1997, he served as the Executive Member for Finance on the council and was a governor at Parrs Wood High School.

== Parliamentary career ==
Smith was selected as the Labour Party candidate for the Manchester Withington constituency in June 2013, ahead of Angela Rayner and fellow Manchester councillor Andrew Simcock. At the general election in May 2015, Smith was elected, defeating the incumbent MP, Liberal Democrat John Leech, with a majority of 14,873.

Smith served as a senior Opposition whip from 2015 to 2021. He supported Owen Smith in the 2016 Labour Party leadership election.

In July 2015, Jeff Smith voted to prevent the government's Welfare Bill going through on the second reading, and voted against it at the third reading.

Smith campaigned to remain in the European Union. In January 2017, he voted against triggering Article 50. On 14 March 2019, Smith voted to reject the then prime minister Theresa May's Brexit deal and a no-deal Brexit.

Smith was re-elected at the 2017 snap general election, securing 71.7% of the vote and more than doubling his majority over John Leech, re-contesting the seat, to 29,875 (55.8%).

Smith is Chair of the All-Party Parliamentary Group on Mental Health, and sits on the advisory board of theMoney and Mental Health Policy Institute. He is Vice Chair of the All-Party Parliamentary Humanist Group.

Smith co-founded the Labour Campaign for Drug Policy Reform (LCDPR) with Thangam Debbonaire, and is Co-Chair of the All-Party Parliamentary Group on Drug Policy Reform. On 20 April 2020, Smith appeared in a virtual online 4/20 event hosted by Voltfacehub, where he spoke in favour of the decriminalisation and regulation of the drug cannabis. In September 2020 the LCDPR set out its aims as: supporting a health-based approach to drug use over a punishment based system, support opening drug consumption rooms, support for drug checking services, investment in drug treatment and recovery, decriminalisation of the personal possession of drugs, engaging in the topic of regulation of currently illegal drug markets, looking to the evidence of North America and Latin America to explore the prospect of a regulated cannabis market in the UK.

Smith was appointed as the Shadow Minister for Local Government in the May 2021 Labour reshuffle, filling the position made vacant following Kate Hollern's resignation. Smith was appointed Shadow Minister for Sport, Tourism, Heritage and Music on 4 December in the Shadow Culture department. In the 2023 British shadow cabinet reshuffle, he was appointed Shadow Minister for Clean Power and Consumers on 5 September 2023.

Smith is a parliamentary supporter of both Labour Friends of Israel and Labour Friends of Palestine and the Middle East.

In 2024, Smith voted in favour of the Assisted Dying Bill proposed by fellow Labour MP Kim Leadbeater.

== Personal life ==
Smith's mother was born in Dublin. His grandfather, Jack McDermott, was an Irish trade unionist who brought his family to Manchester when he was elected general secretary of the Amalgamated Society of Woodworkers.

Smith's Jewish great-grandmother, Rosa Simonson, came to Manchester in the 1880s to escape antisemitic persecution in what is now Poland.

Before being elected, Smith was an event manager and DJ, and has performed regularly at V Festival and club nights Poptastic in Manchester and Star in Leeds.

Parliament of the United Kingdom
Preceded by John Leech	Member of Parliament for Manchester Withington; 2015–present	Incumbent
