= 2004 Manchester City Council election =

2004 UK local government election

- 10 June 2004

96 of 96 seats to Manchester City Council 49 seats needed for a majority
	First party	Second party	Third party
Leader	Richard Leese	Simon Ashley	Vanessa Hall
Party	Labour	Liberal Democrats	Green
Leader's seat	Crumpsall	Gorton South	Hulme
Last election	21 seats, 44.8%	12 seats, 36.2%	1 seats, 6.5%
Seats before	71	27	1
Seats won	57	27	1
Seats after	57	38	1
Seat change	▼10	▲10	Steady
Popular vote	122,273	102,321	22,075
Percentage	43.2%	36.2%	7.8%
Swing	▼1.6%	Steady	▲1.3%
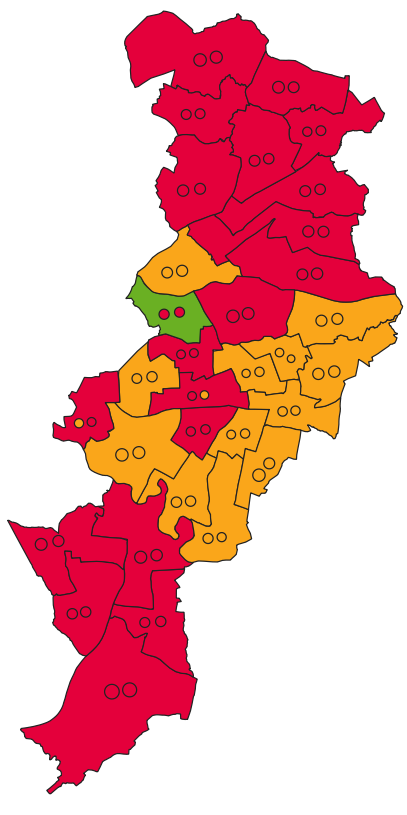
- Map of results of 2004 election
Leader of the Council before election
Richard Leese
Labour
Leader of the Council after election
Richard Leese
Labour

Manchester City Council elections were held on 10 June 2004.

Due to demographic changes in the Borough since its formation in 1973, and in common with most other English Councils in 2004, substantial boundary changes were implemented in time for these elections. Due to these changes, it was necessary for the whole Council to be re-elected for the first time since 1973. Each ward elected three candidates, with the first-placed candidate serving a four-year term of office, expiring in 2008, the second-placed candidate serving a three-year term of office, expiring in 2007, and the third-placed candidate serving a two-year term of office, expiring in 2006. The three Independent Labour candidates stood as "Independent Progressive Labour". Turnout was dramatically improved at 34.3%, up by a third upon the previous election and much higher than the norm set in recent elections of low twenties. The Labour Party retained overall control of the council, but with a majority reduced to the teens for the first time since the 1970s.

== Election result ==
Party	Votes		Seats		
Labour Party	122,273 (43.2%)	▼1.6	57 (59.4%)	57 / 96	▼10
Liberal Democrats	102,321 (36.2%)	Steady	38 (39.6%)	38 / 96	▲10
Green Party	22,075 (7.8%)	▲1.3	1 (1.0%)	1 / 96	Steady
Conservative Party	31,401 (11.1%)	▲1.1	0 (0.0%)	0 / 96	Steady
Independent Labour	1,491 (0.5%)	▼0.6	0 (0.0%)	0 / 96	Steady
Respect	1,132 (0.4%)	N/A	0 (0.0%)	0 / 96	N/A
Independent	887 (0.3%)	▲0.2	0 (0.0%)	0 / 96	Steady
BNP	480 (0.2%)	▼0.1	0 (0.0%)	0 / 96	Steady
Socialist Labour	343 (0.1%)	N/A	0 (0.0%)	0 / 96	N/A
UKIP	205 (0.1%)	N/A	0 (0.0%)	0 / 96	N/A
Socialist Alliance	162 (0.1%)	▼0.9	0 (0.0%)	0 / 34	Steady

↓
1	57	38

== Ward results ==
=== Ancoats and Clayton ===
Ancoats and Clayton
Party	Candidate	Votes	%	±%
Labour	Michael Carmody*	1,406	44.9	
Labour	Mick Loughman*	1,385	44.3	
Labour	Jim Battle*	1,330	42.5	
Liberal Democrats	Richard Clayton*	1,237	39.5	
Liberal Democrats	Elaine Boyes	1,216	38.9	
Liberal Democrats	Oliver West	1,028	32.9	
Conservative	Bessie O'Connor	157	5.0	
Conservative	Beatrice Eyes	153	4.9	
Green	Rose Cameron	144	4.6	
Conservative	Raymond Kenyon	135	4.3	
Green	Joseph Richardson	124	4.0	
Independent	John Hulse	108	3.5	
Green	Jonathan Rotheram	100	3.1	
Majority		93	3.0	
Turnout		3,128	38.1	
Labour win (new seat)				
Labour win (new seat)				
Labour win (new seat)				

=== Ardwick ===
Ardwick
Party	Candidate	Votes	%	±%
Labour	Thomas O'Callaghan*	1,162	47.8	
Labour	Bernard Priest*	1,029	42.4	
Labour	Mavis Smitheman*	992	40.8	
Liberal Democrats	Mohammad Panwar	697	28.7	
Liberal Democrats	Daniel Campbell	536	22.1	
Liberal Democrats	Joseph Podbylski	453	18.6	
Green	Hannah Berry	330	13.6	
Conservative	George Hemsley	181	7.5	
Conservative	Peter Hill	174	7.2	
Independent	Christopher Maloney	172	7.1	
Conservative	Raymond Wattenbach	160	6.6	
Majority		295	12.1	
Turnout		2,429	24.4	
Labour win (new seat)				
Labour win (new seat)				
Labour win (new seat)				

=== Baguley ===
Baguley
Party	Candidate	Votes	%	±%
Labour Co-op	Paul Andrews*	1,622	54.0	
Labour Co-op	Edward McCulley*	1,297	43.2	
Labour Co-op	Tony Burns*	1,162	38.7	
Conservative	Christopher Barlow	631	21.0	
Conservative	Carol Roberts	549	18.3	
Conservative	Leslie I'Anson	542	18.0	
Liberal Democrats	Estelle-Marie Burney	417	13.9	
Green	Lynne Richmond	344	11.5	
Liberal Democrats	Matthew Armstrong	296	9.9	
Liberal Democrats	Hayley Lewis	293	9.8	
Green	Beth Knowles	220	7.3	
Green	Peter Somerville	188	6.3	
Majority		531	17.7	
Turnout		3,004	29.4	
Labour Co-op win (new seat)				
Labour Co-op win (new seat)				
Labour Co-op win (new seat)				

=== Bradford ===
Bradford
Party	Candidate	Votes	%	±%
Labour	Neil Swannick*	1,537	60.2	
Labour	John Smith*	1,478	57.9	
Labour	John Longsden*	1,466	57.4	
Liberal Democrats	Lorraine Bowman	520	20.4	
Liberal Democrats	Peter Fairhurst	482	18.9	
Liberal Democrats	William Fisher	346	13.5	
Green	Christopher Waldon	215	8.4	
Conservative	Brian Birchenough	205	8.0	
Conservative	Christine Birchenough	205	8.0	
Conservative	Karen Abbad	188	7.4	
Majority		946	37.0	
Turnout		2,554	29.8	
Labour win (new seat)				
Labour win (new seat)				
Labour win (new seat)				

=== Brooklands ===
Brooklands
Party	Candidate	Votes	%	±%
Labour	Glynn Evans*	1,505	44.1	
Labour	Susan Cooley*	1,463	42.9	
Labour	Susan Murphy*	1,247	36.5	
Conservative	Jane Percival	1,152	33.8	
Conservative	Graeme Coombes	939	27.5	
Conservative	Lisa-Ann Boardman	932	27.3	
Liberal Democrats	Pamela Davis	449	13.2	
Liberal Democrats	David Kierman	425	12.5	
Liberal Democrats	Barbara McMenamin	417	12.2	
Green	Jeffrey Ostle	249	7.3	
Green	Colin Pratt	222	6.5	
Majority		95	2.7	
Turnout		3,412	34.8	
Labour win (new seat)				
Labour win (new seat)				
Labour win (new seat)				

=== Burnage ===
Burnage
Party	Candidate	Votes	%	±%
Liberal Democrats	John Cameron*	2,484	61.6	
Liberal Democrats	Iain Donaldson*	1,925	47.7	
Liberal Democrats	Rodney Isherwood	1,846	45.8	
Labour	Frank Duffy	1,085	26.9	
Labour	Bernard Selby*	964	23.9	
Labour	William Parbury	542	13.4	
Conservative	Gregory Stevens	373	9.2	
Green	Matthew Payne	344	8.5	
Green	Michael Shaw	263	6.5	
Green	Barry McAtarsney	230	5.7	
Majority		761	18.9	
Turnout		4,034	40.1	
Liberal Democrats win (new seat)				
Liberal Democrats win (new seat)				
Liberal Democrats win (new seat)				

=== Charlestown ===
Charlestown
Party	Candidate	Votes	%	±%
Labour	Mark Hackett*	1,941	61.6	
Labour	Basil Curley*	1,723	54.7	
Labour	Eric Hobin*	1,557	49.4	
Liberal Democrats	Norman Towers	812	25.8	
Conservative	Kim Glasspole	531	16.8	
Liberal Democrats	Winifred Taylor	475	15.1	
Liberal Democrats	Guy Otten	391	12.4	
Majority		745	23.6	
Turnout		3,152	34.5	
Labour win (new seat)				
Labour win (new seat)				
Labour win (new seat)				

=== Cheetham ===
Cheetham
Party	Candidate	Votes	%	±%
Labour	Martin Pagel*	2,184	46.9	
Labour	Mohammed Khan*	2,177	46.8	
Labour	Imran Rizvi	1,921	41.3	
Liberal Democrats	Qassim Afzal*	1,806	38.8	
Liberal Democrats	Mohammed Sabir	1,419	30.5	
Liberal Democrats	Ibrar Hussain	1,412	30.3	
Respect	Kay Phillips	519	11.1	
Conservative	Dorothy Keller	366	7.9	
Majority		115	2.5	
Turnout		4,655	47.2	
Labour win (new seat)				
Labour win (new seat)				
Labour win (new seat)				

=== Chorlton ===
Chorlton
Party	Candidate	Votes	%	±%
Labour	Sheila Newman*	1,635	34.7	
Liberal Democrats	Angela Gallagher	1,620	34.4	
Labour	Val Stevens*	1,602	34.0	
Liberal Democrats	Charles Glover	1,448	30.7	
Labour	John Hacking	1,413	30.0	
Liberal Democrats	Rajah Bhatti	1,385	29.4	
Green	Juliet Lawson	765	16.2	
Green	Michael Daw	752	16.0	
Green	Jessica Symons	726	15.4	
Conservative	Malcolm Cleall-Hill	429	9.1	
Conservative	Nicholas Antoniou	401	8.5	
Respect	Ameen Hadi	351	7.4	
Conservative	Amar Ahmed	334	7.1	
Socialist Alliance	Daniel Murphy	162	3.4	
Majority		154	3.3	
Turnout		4,712	46.9	
Labour win (new seat)				
Liberal Democrats win (new seat)				
Labour win (new seat)				

=== Chorlton Park ===
Chorlton Park
Party	Candidate	Votes	%	±%
Liberal Democrats	John Leech*	2,113	51.8	
Liberal Democrats	Tony Bethell	1,970	48.3	
Liberal Democrats	Norman Lewis	1,936	47.4	
Labour	Elizabeth Morgan	1,073	26.3	
Labour	David Ellison	871	21.3	
Labour	Bernice Reid*	848	20.8	
Green	Kathryn Brownbridge	605	14.8	
Green	George Czernuszka	461	11.3	
Green	John Cummings	379	9.3	
Conservative	Richard Mason	319	7.8	
Respect	Ismail Farhat	262	6.4	
Majority		863	21.1	
Turnout		4,082	43.0	
Liberal Democrats win (new seat)				
Liberal Democrats win (new seat)				
Liberal Democrats win (new seat)				

=== City Centre ===
City Centre
Party	Candidate	Votes	%	±%
Liberal Democrats	Marc Ramsbottom*	558	38.5	
Liberal Democrats	Kenneth Dobson	507	35.0	
Liberal Democrats	Peter Rothery*	501	34.6	
Labour	Kathleen Crotty	411	28.4	
Labour	Christopher Paul	405	28.0	
Labour	Ahmed Ali	379	26.2	
Conservative	Geoffrey Berg	226	15.6	
Conservative	Jonathan Mountain	226	15.6	
Conservative	Robert Bell	225	15.5	
Green	Birgit Vollm	224	15.5	
Green	Steven Durrant	163	11.2	
Green	James Blake	106	7.3	
Independent	Alan Valentine	70	4.8	
Majority		90	6.2	
Turnout		1,449	18.8	
Liberal Democrats win (new seat)				
Liberal Democrats win (new seat)				
Liberal Democrats win (new seat)				

=== Crumpsall ===
Crumpsall
Party	Candidate	Votes	%	±%
Labour	Richard Leese*	1,862	51.2	
Labour	Con Keegan*	1,717	47.2	
Labour	Jon-Leigh Pritchard	1,388	38.2	
Liberal Democrats	Sham Akhtar	816	22.4	
Conservative	Rodney Keller	767	21.1	
Liberal Democrats	Stephen Allen	757	20.8	
Green	Barbara Lewis	692	19.0	
Liberal Democrats	Andrew Weston	537	14.8	
Conservative	Garvan Walshe	487	13.4	
Majority		572	15.8	
Turnout		3,635	36.7	
Labour win (new seat)				
Labour win (new seat)				
Labour win (new seat)				

=== Didsbury East ===
Didsbury East
Party	Candidate	Votes	%	±%
Liberal Democrats	David Sandiford*	2,491	49.8	
Liberal Democrats	Helen Fisher*	2,228	44.6	
Liberal Democrats	Anthony Parkinson*	2,196	43.9	
Labour	Geoffrey Bridson	1,639	32.8	
Labour	Andrew Simcock	1,325	26.5	
Labour	Michael Emmerich	1,308	26.2	
Conservative	Peter Schofield	666	13.3	
Conservative	Daniel Valentine	547	10.9	
Conservative	Nicholas Garside	522	10.4	
Green	Jennifer Bailey	423	8.5	
Green	Frances Simpson	335	6.7	
Green	Darren Milton	313	6.3	
Majority		557	11.1	
Turnout		4,999	48.4	
Liberal Democrats win (new seat)				
Liberal Democrats win (new seat)				
Liberal Democrats win (new seat)				

=== Didsbury West ===
Didsbury West
Party	Candidate	Votes	%	±%
Liberal Democrats	Graham Shaw	1,565	43.4	
Liberal Democrats	Neil Trafford*	1,515	42.0	
Liberal Democrats	Simon Wheale*	1,476	40.9	
Labour	Brendan Turner	745	20.6	
Labour	Emily Lomax	706	19.6	
Labour	Peter Copping	627	17.4	
Green	Richard Gee	589	16.3	
Green	Robina-Ella Davies	578	16.0	
Conservative	Peter Hilton	554	15.4	
Conservative	Sean Ell	503	13.9	
Conservative	Jonathan Smith	466	12.9	
Green	Clifford Saffer	443	12.3	
UKIP	Robert Gutfreund-Walmsley	205	5.7	
Majority		731	20.3	
Turnout		3,609	36.4	
Liberal Democrats win (new seat)				
Liberal Democrats win (new seat)				
Liberal Democrats win (new seat)				

=== Fallowfield ===
Fallowfield
Party	Candidate	Votes	%	±%
Labour	David Royle*	1,233	39.7	
Labour	Peter Morrison*	1,121	36.1	
Liberal Democrats	John-Paul Wilkins	1,066	34.3	
Liberal Democrats	Paul Ankers	1,064	34.2	
Liberal Democrats	Rob Brettle	1,036	33.3	
Labour	Mike Amesbury	1,005	32.3	
Green	Bruce Bingham	331	10.6	
Green	Bernard Ekbery	299	9.6	
Green	Peter Dungey	294	9.5	
Conservative	Craig Lewel	283	9.1	
Conservative	Ahsanul Awan	269	8.7	
Conservative	David Vila	254	8.2	
Majority		2	0.1	
Turnout		3,108	30.5	
Labour win (new seat)				
Labour win (new seat)				
Liberal Democrats win (new seat)				

=== Gorton North ===
Gorton North
Party	Candidate	Votes	%	±%
Liberal Democrats	Jacqueline Pearcey*	1,578	46.3	
Liberal Democrats	Wendy Helsby*	1,491	43.7	
Liberal Democrats	Bernadette Newing	1,399	41.0	
Labour	Allan Grafton	1,326	38.9	
Labour	Julie Reid	1,227	36.0	
Labour	Louis Hughes	1,180	34.6	
Conservative	David Blinston	271	7.9	
Conservative	Paul Mostyn	217	6.4	
Conservative	Wesley Roche	199	5.8	
Green	Rachel Harper	177	5.2	
Majority		73	2.1	
Turnout		3,410	33.3	
Liberal Democrats win (new seat)				
Liberal Democrats win (new seat)				
Liberal Democrats win (new seat)				

=== Gorton South ===
Gorton South
Party	Candidate	Votes	%	±%
Liberal Democrats	James Ashley*	1,884	55.0	
Liberal Democrats	Simon Ashley*	1,827	53.3	
Liberal Democrats	John Bridges*	1,768	51.6	
Labour	Peter Cookson	934	27.3	
Labour	Raymond Kelly	934	27.3	
Labour	Martin Rathfelder	824	24.1	
Green	Gareth Pittam	325	9.5	
Conservative	Alice Boden	256	7.5	
Conservative	Rosemary Bishop	231	6.7	
Conservative	Frederich Morris	201	5.9	
Majority		834	24.3	
Turnout		3,426	31.6	
Liberal Democrats win (new seat)				
Liberal Democrats win (new seat)				
Liberal Democrats win (new seat)				

=== Harpurhey ===
Harpurhey
Party	Candidate	Votes	%	±%
Labour	Patrick Karney*	1,600	52.9	
Labour	Joanne Green*	1,431	47.3	
Labour	Paul Fairweather*	1,365	45.1	
Liberal Democrats	Robert Dyson	691	22.9	
Liberal Democrats	David Gordon	595	19.7	
Liberal Democrats	Barbara Argyropoulos	564	18.7	
Conservative	Sebastian Chowdhury	409	13.5	
Socialist Labour	Mervyn Drage	179	5.9	
Majority		674	22.2	
Turnout		3,024	27.0	
Labour win (new seat)				
Labour win (new seat)				
Labour win (new seat)				

=== Higher Blackley ===
Higher Blackley
Party	Candidate	Votes	%	±%
Labour	Kenneth Barnes*	1,829	59.9	
Labour	Harold Lyons*	1,823	56.7	
Labour	Anna Trotman*	1,818	56.6	
Conservative	Vivienne Clarke	601	18.7	
Liberal Democrats	Vera Towers	597	18.6	
Conservative	Charles Johnson	484	15.1	
Conservative	Adrian Glasspole	483	15.0	
Liberal Democrats	Ian Kimpton	395	12.3	
Liberal Democrats	Neville Taylor	391	12.2	
Majority		1,217	37.9	
Turnout		3,214	32.3	
Labour win (new seat)				
Labour win (new seat)				
Labour win (new seat)				

=== Hulme ===
Hulme
Party	Candidate	Votes	%	±%
Green	Vanessa Hall*	856	37.9	
Labour	Mary Murphy*	825	36.5	
Labour	Gerry Diamond*	819	36.3	
Green	Christine Shelmerdine	730	32.3	
Labour	Paul Lock	634	28.1	
Green	Brian Candeland	553	24.5	
Liberal Democrats	Andrew Turvey	437	19.3	
Liberal Democrats	Shirley Inniss	345	15.3	
Liberal Democrats	Kevin Morley	295	13.1	
Conservative	Joyce Haycock	167	7.4	
Conservative	Cecilia James	150	6.6	
Conservative	Linda Mansell	145	6.4	
Majority		89	4.0	
Turnout		2,259	25.6	
Green win (new seat)				
Labour win (new seat)				
Labour win (new seat)				

=== Levenshulme ===
Levenshulme
Party	Candidate	Votes	%	±%
Liberal Democrats	Keith Whitmore*	2,026	57.5	
Liberal Democrats	John Commons*	1,906	54.1	
Liberal Democrats	Alexander Cowan	1,865	52.9	
Labour	Patrick McGuinness	918	26.1	
Green	Peter Thompson	623	17.7	
Labour	Patrick Perry	608	17.3	
Labour	Nicholas Macgregor	524	14.9	
Conservative	Julie Gilbody	239	6.8	
Conservative	David Gilbody	227	6.4	
Conservative	William Moore	225	6.4	
Majority		947	26.9	
Turnout		3,523	32.5	
Liberal Democrats win (new seat)				
Liberal Democrats win (new seat)				
Liberal Democrats win (new seat)				

=== Longsight ===
Longsight
Party	Candidate	Votes	%	±%
Liberal Democrats	Liaqat Ali*	1,661	42.9	
Liberal Democrats	Abid Chohan	1,622	41.9	
Liberal Democrats	Mohammed Sajjad	1,563	40.4	
Labour	Sajjad Hussain*	1,134	29.3	
Labour	Zeke Ukairo*	1,125	29.1	
Labour	Jawaid Chaudhry	1,121	29.0	
Green	Spencer Fitzgibbon	603	15.6	
Conservative	Zahir Ali	353	9.1	
Conservative	Vincent Pierce	307	7.9	
Conservative	Nigel Applewhite	304	7.9	
Majority		429	11.1	
Turnout		3,870	38.3	
Liberal Democrats win (new seat)				
Liberal Democrats win (new seat)				
Liberal Democrats win (new seat)				

=== Miles Platting and Newton Heath ===
Miles Platting and Newton Heath
Party	Candidate	Votes	%	±%
Labour	Christine Carroll*	1,324	39.8	
Labour	June Hitchin*	1,258	37.8	
Labour	John Flanagan	1,007	30.3	
Independent Labour	Damo O'Connor	689	20.7	
Liberal Democrats	Richard Wilson*	615	18.5	
Liberal Democrats	Timothy Hartley	607	18.3	
Liberal Democrats	Jennifer Staniforth	606	18.2	
BNP	Derek Adams	480	14.4	
Independent Labour	Jean Livesey	417	12.5	
Independent Labour	Fred Bates	385	11.6	
Conservative	Albert Walsh	267	8.0	
Conservative	Anthony Walsh	234	7.0	
Conservative	David Conway	210	6.3	
Green	Chloe Wilson	182	5.5	
Majority		318	9.6	
Turnout		3,325	32.0	
Labour win (new seat)				
Labour win (new seat)				
Labour win (new seat)				

=== Moss Side ===
Moss Side
Party	Candidate	Votes	%	±%
Labour	William Alistair Cox*	1,638	57.2	
Labour	Locita Brandy*	1,602	55.9	
Labour	Roy Walters*	1,599	55.8	
Liberal Democrats	Shaheen Hussain	478	16.7	
Liberal Democrats	Ibrahim Elarifi	457	15.9	
Liberal Democrats	Abdulmagid Salih	426	14.9	
Green	Errol Flemmings	229	8.0	
Green	Adam Higgin	209	7.3	
Green	Paddy Wagon	206	7.2	
Independent	Anthony Weekes	205	7.2	
Conservative	Patricia Ainscough	176	6.1	
Independent	Samuel Brown	167	5.8	
Independent	Anthony Brown	165	5.8	
Conservative	Elizabeth Riley	158	5.5	
Conservative	Paul Kierman	142	5.0	
Majority		1,121	39.1	
Turnout		2,866	27.9	
Labour win (new seat)				
Labour win (new seat)				
Labour win (new seat)				

=== Moston ===
Moston
Party	Candidate	Votes	%	±%
Labour	Paul Murphy*	2,210	55.1	
Labour	Henry Cooper*	2,193	54.7	
Labour	Bill Risby*	2,093	52.2	
Conservative	Stuart Kirkwood	957	23.9	
Conservative	Gerald Freedman-Goldberger	753	18.8	
Conservative	Harvey Cochrane	729	18.2	
Liberal Democrats	Celia Carroll	456	11.4	
Liberal Democrats	Catherine Kilday	429	10.7	
Liberal Democrats	Philip Hardman	421	10.5	
Socialist Labour	Kenneth Barr	164	4.1	
Majority		1,136	28.3	
Turnout		4,009	37.4	
Labour win (new seat)				
Labour win (new seat)				
Labour win (new seat)				

=== Northenden ===
Northenden
Party	Candidate	Votes	%	±%
Labour	Michael Kane*	1,611	47.5	
Labour	Ian Wilmott*	1,360	40.1	
Labour	Richard Cowell*	1,262	37.2	
Liberal Democrats	Marguerite Goldsmith	723	21.3	
Conservative	Ralph Ellerton	650	19.2	
Green	Lance Crookes	618	18.2	
Conservative	Gary Kaye	601	17.7	
Conservative	Mohamed Bhatti	477	14.1	
Liberal Democrats	Angela Bethell	426	12.6	
Liberal Democrats	Howard Totty	406	12.0	
Majority		539	15.9	
Turnout		3,392	32.9	
Labour win (new seat)				
Labour win (new seat)				
Labour win (new seat)				

=== Old Moat ===
Old Moat
Party	Candidate	Votes	%	±%
Labour	Andrew Fender*	1,599	48.2	
Labour	Jeffrey Smith*	1,572	47.4	
Labour	Brian Harrison*	1,541	46.5	
Liberal Democrats	Enid Saunders	884	26.7	
Liberal Democrats	Shakeel Ahmad	881	26.6	
Liberal Democrats	John Reyes	865	26.1	
Green	Paul Dundon	403	12.2	
Green	Susan Fairweather	392	11.8	
Conservative	Nicholas Wilson	352	10.6	
Green	Steven Flower	335	10.1	
Majority		657	19.8	
Turnout		3,314	32.4	
Labour win (new seat)				
Labour win (new seat)				
Labour win (new seat)				

=== Rusholme ===
Rusholme
Party	Candidate	Votes	%	±%
Liberal Democrats	Paul Shannon*	1,958	55.4	
Liberal Democrats	Abu Chowdhury	1,901	53.7	
Liberal Democrats	Lynne Williams*	1,894	53.5	
Labour	Nilofar Siddiqi	1,000	28.3	
Labour	John Byrne*	952	26.9	
Labour	Zafar Mir	889	25.1	
Green	Penelope Collins	329	9.3	
Green	Christopher Middleton	234	6.6	
Conservative	Cedric Beniston	214	6.1	
Green	John Poole	203	5.7	
Conservative	Barbara Goodall	200	5.7	
Conservative	Tadeusz Sochacki	160	4.5	
Majority		894	25.2	
Turnout		3,537	38.0	
Liberal Democrats win (new seat)				
Liberal Democrats win (new seat)				
Liberal Democrats win (new seat)				

=== Sharston ===
Sharston
Party	Candidate	Votes	%	±%
Labour Co-op	Thomas Judge*	1,411	50.9	
Labour Co-op	Joyce Keller*	1,349	48.7	
Labour Co-op	Hugh Barratt*	1,271	45.9	
Conservative	Joyce Kaye	527	19.0	
Conservative	Trevor Roberts	524	18.9	
Conservative	Agnes Carroll	515	18.6	
Liberal Democrats	Jeanette McKay	463	16.7	
Green	Christopher Ireland	403	14.5	
Liberal Democrats	Ann Rodgers	396	14.3	
Liberal Democrats	Robert West	310	11.2	
Majority		744	26.9	
Turnout		2,772	27.0	
Labour Co-op win (new seat)				
Labour Co-op win (new seat)				
Labour Co-op win (new seat)				

=== Whalley Range ===
Whalley Range
Party	Candidate	Votes	%	±%
Liberal Democrats	John Grant*	1,999	45.0	
Liberal Democrats	Faraz Bhatti	1,943	43.7	
Liberal Democrats	Joy Winder	1,650	37.1	
Labour	Kath Fry*	1,459	32.8	
Labour	Aftab Ahmed	1,437	32.3	
Labour	Tony Dale*	1,363	30.7	
Conservative	Melody Leroy	998	22.4	
Green	Helen Dolan	638	14.3	
Green	Mary Candeland	563	12.7	
Green	Robin Goater	545	12.3	
Conservative	Matthew Cox	370	8.3	
Conservative	Richard West	282	6.3	
Majority		191	4.3	
Turnout		4,446	43.8	
Liberal Democrats win (new seat)				
Liberal Democrats win (new seat)				
Liberal Democrats win (new seat)				

=== Withington ===
Withington
Party	Candidate	Votes	%	±%
Liberal Democrats	Audrey Jones*	1,811	61.4	
Liberal Democrats	Alison Firth*	1,747	59.2	
Liberal Democrats	Helen Jones	1,537	52.1	
Labour	Gerard Collier	578	19.6	
Labour	Mark Bowcock	509	17.2	
Green	Gregory Griffin	446	15.1	
Labour	Steve Nuttall	439	14.9	
Green	Bushra Hussain	409	13.9	
Conservative	Andrew Perfect	267	9.0	
Majority		959	32.5	
Turnout		2,951	30.7	
Liberal Democrats win (new seat)				
Liberal Democrats win (new seat)				
Liberal Democrats win (new seat)				

=== Woodhouse Park ===
Woodhouse Park
Party	Candidate	Votes	%	±%
Labour	Brian O'Neil*	1,484	56.1	
Labour	Barbara O'Neil	1,461	55.3	
Labour	Edward Newman*	1,315	49.8	
Conservative	Irene I'Anson	407	15.4	
Conservative	Ruby Raynor	360	13.6	
Conservative	James Percival	351	13.3	
Liberal Democrats	Anne McKay	349	13.2	
Liberal Democrats	Chris Scott	336	12.7	
Liberal Democrats	Charles Sinclair	280	10.6	
Green	Daniel Chivers	216	8.2	
Green	Ashleigh Vincent	197	7.5	
Majority		908	34.4	
Turnout		2,643	27.5	
Labour win (new seat)				
Labour win (new seat)				
Labour win (new seat)				
