= Charlestown (Manchester ward) =

Electoral division in the United Kingdom

- Ward
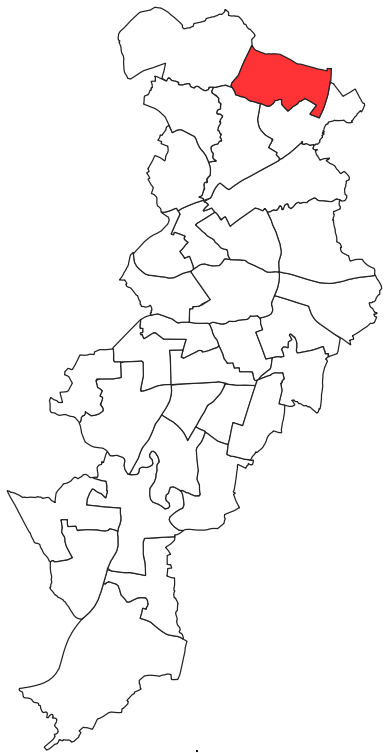
- Charlestown ward (2018) within Manchester

- Coat of arms
- Interactive map of Charlestown
- Country: United Kingdom
- Constituent country: England
- Region: North West England
- County: Greater Manchester
- Metropolitan borough: Manchester
- Created: May 1971
- Named for: Charlestown

Government
  - Type: Unicameral
  - Body: Manchester City Council
- UK Parliamentary Constituency: Blackley and Middleton South

Charlestown is an electoral division of Manchester City Council which has been represented since 1971. It covers the North Manchester suburb of Charlestown and parts of Blackley.

== Overview ==
Charlestown ward was created in 1971, covering the northern portions of the Blackley and Moston wards. In 1982, the ward incorporated that part of the Crumpsall ward to the northeast of the River Irk. That area was returned to the Crumpsall ward after further city-wide boundary revision in 2004, which also made the ward's eastern boundary the Caldervale Line. The ward's boundaries were left largely unchanged at the latest revision in 2018.

From its creation until 2010, the ward formed part of the Manchester Blackley Parliamentary constituency. Between 2010 and 2024, it formed part of the Blackley and Broughton Parliamentary constituency. Since 2024, it has formed part of the Blackley and Middleton South Parliamentary constituency.

== Councillors ==
Election	Councillor	Councillor	Councillor
1971	L. Kelly (Lab)	J. S. Goldstone (Lab)	S. C. Silverman (Lab)
1972	L. Kelly (Lab)	J. S. Goldstone (Lab)	S. C. Silverman (Lab)
1973	L. Kelly (Lab)	N. Morris (Lab)	S. C. Silverman (Lab)
1975	L. Kelly (Lab)	N. Morris (Lab)	J. Hood (Con)
1976	L. Kelly (Lab)	N. Morris (Lab)	J. Hood (Con)
1978	L. Kelly (Lab)	N. Morris (Lab)	J. Hood (Con)
1979	L. Kelly (Lab)	N. Morris (Lab)	G. Stringer (Lab)
1980	L. Kelly (Lab)	N. Morris (Lab)	G. Stringer (Lab)
1982	H. Lee (Lab)	D. Ford (Lab)	A. Wood (Lab)
1983	H. Lee (Lab)	D. Ford (Lab)	A. Wood (Lab)
1984	H. Lee (Lab)	D. Ford (Lab)	A. Wood (Lab)
1986	S. McCardell (Lab)	D. Ford (Lab)	A. Wood (Lab)
1987	S. McCardell (Lab)	D. Ford (Lab)	V. Edwards (Lab)
1988	S. McCardell (Lab)	B. Curley (Lab)	V. Edwards (Lab)
1990	S. McCardell (Lab)	B. Curley (Lab)	V. Edwards (Lab)
1991	S. McCardell (Lab)	B. Curley (Lab)	N. Tilley (Lab)
1992	B. Curley (Lab)	M. Hackett (Lab)	N. Tilley (Lab)
1994	B. Curley (Lab)	M. Hackett (Lab)	N. Tilley (Lab)
1995	B. Curley (Lab)	M. Hackett (Lab)	E. Hobin (Lab)
1996	B. Curley (Lab)	M. Hackett (Lab)	E. Hobin (Lab)
1998	B. Curley (Lab)	M. Hackett (Lab)	E. Hobin (Lab)
1999	B. Curley (Lab)	M. Hackett (Lab)	E. Hobin (Lab)
2000	B. Curley (Lab)	M. Hackett (Lab)	E. Hobin (Lab)
2002	B. Curley (Lab)	M. Hackett (Lab)	E. Hobin (Lab)
2003	B. Curley (Lab)	M. Hackett (Lab)	E. Hobin (Lab)
2004	Mark Hackett (Lab)	Basil Curley (Lab)	Eric Hobin (Lab)
2006	Mark Hackett (Lab)	Basil Curley (Lab)	Eric Hobin (Lab)
2007	Mark Hackett (Lab)	Basil Curley (Lab)	Eric Hobin (Lab)
June 2007	Mark Hackett (Lab)	Basil Curley (Lab)	Veronica Kirkpatrick (Lab)
2008	Mark Hackett (Lab)	Basil Curley (Lab)	Veronica Kirkpatrick (Lab)
2010	Mark Hackett (Lab)	Basil Curley (Lab)	Veronica Kirkpatrick (Lab)
2011	Mark Hackett (Lab)	Basil Curley (Lab)	Veronica Kirkpatrick (Lab)
2012	Mark Hackett (Lab)	Basil Curley (Lab)	Veronica Kirkpatrick (Lab)
2014	Mark Hackett (Lab)	Basil Curley (Lab)	Veronica Kirkpatrick (Lab)
2015	Mark Hackett (Lab)	Basil Curley (Lab)	Veronica Kirkpatrick (Lab)
2016	Hannah Priest (Lab)	Basil Curley (Lab)	Veronica Kirkpatrick (Lab)
2018	Veronica Kirkpatrick (Lab)	Hannah Priest (Lab)	Basil Curley (Lab)
2019	Veronica Kirkpatrick (Lab)	Hannah Priest (Lab)	Basil Curley (Lab)
2021	Veronica Kirkpatrick (Lab)	Hannah Priest (Lab)	Basil Curley (Lab)
2022	Veronica Kirkpatrick (Lab)	Hannah Priest (Lab)	Basil Curley (Lab)
2023	Veronica Kirkpatrick (Lab)	Hannah Priest (Lab)	Basil Curley (Lab)
2024	Veronica Kirkpatrick (Lab)	Uzma Jafri (Lab)	Basil Curley (Lab)
2026	Dylan Evans (Ref UK)	Uzma Jafri (Lab)	Basil Curley (Lab)

== Elections ==
=== Elections in 2020s ===
==== May 2026 ====
2026
Party	Candidate	Votes	%	±%
Reform	Dylan Evans	1,566	43.6	New
Labour	Veronica Kirkpatrick*	1,202	33.5	▼36.4
Green	Ali Wood	652	18.2	▲7.3
Liberal Democrats	Charles Turner	172	4.8	▲1.4
Majority		364	10.1	N/A
Turnout		3,592	29.6	▲8.8
Reform gain from Labour		Swing		

==== May 2024 ====
2024
Party	Candidate	Votes	%	±%
Labour	Uzma Jafri	1,602	58.6	5.5 ▼
Green	Paul Dominick Hodges	591	21.6	15.2 ▲
Conservative	Muhammad Arbab Khan	299	10.9	6.6 ▼
Liberal Democrats	Melanie Ncube	176	6.4	2.7 ▲
Majority		1,011	37.0	
Rejected ballots		68	2.5	
Turnout		2,736	22.4	
Registered electors		12,225		
Labour hold		Swing	10.3 ▼	

==== May 2023 ====
2023
Party	Candidate	Votes	%	±%
Labour	Basil Curley*	1,769	71.4	18.6 ▲
Green	Paul Hodges	332	13.4	7.4 ▲
Conservative	Arbab Khan	278	11.2	4.4 ▲
Liberal Democrats	Mohamed Sabbagh	71	2.9	−0.4 ▼
Majority		1,437	58.0	21.0 ▲
Rejected ballots		26	1.1	0.6 ▲
Turnout		2,476	20.5	−1.8 ▼
Registered electors		12,080		
Labour hold		Swing	5.6 ▲	

==== May 2022 ====
2022
Party	Candidate	Votes	%	±%
Labour	Veronica Kirkpatrick*	1,749	69.9	5.1 ▲
Conservative	Mokammel Alam	371	14.8	1.0 ▼
Green	Paul Hodges	272	10.9	1.0 ▲
Liberal Democrats	Melanie Ncube	86	3.4	2.9 ▼
Majority		1,378	55.1	
Rejected ballots		23		
Turnout		2,478	20.8	2.3 ▼
Registered electors		12,023		
Labour hold		Swing	3.1 ▲	

==== May 2021 ====
2021
Party	Candidate	Votes	%	±%
Labour	Hannah Priest*	1,910	64.1	6.2 ▼
Conservative	Michael Ciotkowski	522	17.5	1.3 ▲
Reform	Martin Power	247	8.3	New
Green	Anne Power	190	6.4	2.5 ▲
Liberal Democrats	Melanie Ncube	109	3.7	1.2 ▲
Majority		1388	46.6	
Rejected ballots		25	0.8	
Turnout		3,003	24.76	
Registered electors		12,130		
Labour hold		Swing	3.8 ▼	

=== Elections in 2010s ===
==== May 2019 ====
2019
Party	Candidate	Votes	%	±%
Labour	Basil Curley*	1,387	52.8	▼3.2
Independent	Anthony Brennan	415	15.8	▼2.1
UKIP	Stephen O'Neill	387	14.7	n/a
Conservative	Charalampos Kagkouras	180	6.8	▼6.8
Green	Astrid Johnson	159	6.0	▼3.9
Liberal Democrats	Charles Turner	88	3.3	▼3.0
Majority		972	37.0	▼0.9
Rejected ballots		13	0.49	
Turnout		2,629	22.25	▼0.8
Registered electors		11,817		
Labour hold		Swing	▼0.55	

==== May 2018 ====
2018 (3 vacancies; new boundaries)
Party	Candidate	Votes	%	±%
Labour	Veronica Kirkpatrick*	1,769	64.8	
Labour	Hannah Priest*	1,541	56.4	
Labour	Basil Curley*	1,531	56.0	
Independent	Anthony Brennan	489	17.9	
Conservative	Peter Schofield	433	15.8	
Conservative	Daniel Somers	358	13.1	
Conservative	Michael Shupac	326	11.9	
Green	Astrid Johnson	271	9.9	
Liberal Democrats	Charles Turner	172	6.3	
Majority				
Turnout		2,732	23.1	
Labour win (new boundaries)				
Labour win (new boundaries)				
Labour win (new boundaries)				

==== May 2016 ====
2016
Party	Candidate	Votes	%	±%
Labour	Hannah Kate Priest	1,671	59.38	
UKIP	Neil Caradoc Griffiths	770	27.36	
Conservative	Nicholas David St John Savage	204	7.25	
Green	Astrid Johnson	92	3.27	
Liberal Democrats	Charles William Turner	77	2.74	
Majority		901	32.02	
Turnout		2,814	27.75	
Labour hold		Swing		

==== May 2015 ====
2015
Party	Candidate	Votes	%	±%
Labour	Basil Curley*	3,053	56.4	−14.6
UKIP	Neil Caradoc Griffiths	1,464	27.1	N/A
Conservative	Joshua John Lelliott	549	10.1	−2.4
Green	Astrid Johnson	178	3.3	N/A
Liberal Democrats	William David Fisher	112	2.1	−2.3
TUSC	Alex Wogan	54	1.0	N/A
Majority		1,589	29.3	
Turnout		5,410	52.4	+22.0
Labour hold		Swing		

==== May 2014 ====
2014
Party	Candidate	Votes	%	±%
Labour	Veronica Kirkpatrick	1,741	54.65	+0.05
UKIP	Neil Griffiths	1,030	32.33	N/A
Conservative	Will Stobart	203	14.5	−8.13
Liberal Democrats	Martina Anne Dunican	65	2.04	−10.96
Majority		711	23.4	
Turnout		3,039	30.45	
Labour hold		Swing		

==== May 2012 ====
2012
Party	Candidate	Votes	%	±%
Labour	Mark Hackett*	1,955	75.3	+29.3
Conservative	Tom Archer	292	11.2	−3.5
Green	Chris Hyland	252	9.7	+3.3
Liberal Democrats	Joanne Taylor	98	3.8	−2.4
Majority		1,663	64	
Turnout		2,597	25.36	
Labour hold		Swing		

==== May 2011 ====
2011
Party	Candidate	Votes	%	±%
Labour	Basil Curley*	2,196	71.0	+12.0
Conservative	Ellen Daniels	387	12.5	−3.5
BNP	Stephen Moran	374	12.1	N/A
Liberal Democrats	Richard Ruddick	137	4.4	−5.9
Majority		1,809	58.5	
Turnout		3,094	30.4	
Labour hold		Swing		

==== May 2010 ====
2010
Party	Candidate	Votes	%	±%
Labour	Veronica Kirkpatrick*	2,828	54.6	+8.6
BNP	Stephen Moran	802	15.5	−8.3
Conservative	Philip Steven Donohue	749	14.5	−0.2
Liberal Democrats	Andrew Hardwick-Moss	673	13.0	+6.8
Green	Michael Prior	127	2.5	−3.9
Majority		2,026	39.1	+16.9
Turnout		5179	51.2	+21.4
Labour hold		Swing	+8.4	

=== Elections in 2000s ===
==== May 2008 ====
2008
Party	Candidate	Votes	%	±%
Labour	Mark Hackett*	1,328	46.0	−13.0
BNP	Stephen Moran	687	23.8	+23.8
Conservative	Gareth Brown	425	14.7	−1.3
Green	Michael Prior	186	6.4	+0.7
Liberal Democrats	Alexandra Reynolds-Cocroft	178	6.2	−4.1
UKIP	Catherine Ritchie	84	2.9	−6.2
Majority		641	22.2	−20.7
Turnout		2,888	29.8	+2.0
Labour hold		Swing	-18.4	

==== June 2007 (by-election) ====
By-election: 14 June 2007
Party	Candidate	Votes	%	±%
Labour	Veronica Kirkpatrick	1,373	54.7	−4.3
BNP	Joseph G M Finnon	628	25.0	+25.0
Liberal Democrats	Carol Connell	239	9.5	−0.8
Conservative	Kim E Glasspole	188	7.5	−8.5
Green	Jackie Smith	81	3.2	−2.5
Majority		745	29.6	−13.3
Turnout		2,509	26.5	−1.3
Labour hold		Swing	-14.6	

==== May 2007 ====
2007
Party	Candidate	Votes	%	±%
Labour	Basil Curley*	1,542	59.0	+4.7
Conservative	Kim Glasspole	419	16.0	+1.3
Liberal Democrats	Ann Rodgers	268	10.3	−2.9
UKIP	Andrea Ritchie	238	9.1	−2.7
Green	Helen Dolan	148	5.7	−0.3
Majority		1,123	42.9	+3.3
Turnout		2,615	27.8	−1.4
Labour hold		Swing	+1.7	

==== May 2006 ====
2006
Party	Candidate	Votes	%	±%
Labour	Eric Hobin*	1,435	54.3	−4.8
Conservative	Vivienne Inez Clarke	388	14.7	−1.5
Liberal Democrats	Ann Rodgers	348	13.2	−11.5
UKIP	Catherine Andrea Ritchie	312	11.8	+11.8
Green	Helen Sarah Dolan	159	6.0	+6.0
Majority		1,047	39.6	+5.2
Turnout		2,642	29.2	−5.2
Labour hold		Swing	-1.6	

==== June 2004 ====
2004 (3 vacancies; new boundaries)
Party	Candidate	Votes	%	±%
Labour	Mark Hackett*	1,941	59.1	N/A
Labour	Basil Curley*	1,723		
Labour	Eric Hobin*	1,557		
Liberal Democrats	Norman Towers	812	24.7	N/A
Conservative	Kim Glasspole	531	16.2	N/A
Liberal Democrats	Winifred Taylor	475		
Liberal Democrats	Guy Otten	391		
Majority		745	34.4	N/A
Turnout		3,284	34.4	N/A
Labour win (new seat)				
Labour win (new seat)				
Labour win (new seat)				

==== May 2003 ====
2003
Party	Candidate	Votes	%	±%
Labour	Eric Hobin*	1,043	54.1	−6.6
Liberal Democrats	Rodney Isherwood	498	25.8	−9.2
Conservative	Marilyn Hopkins	302	15.7	+15.7
Green	Mark Gilbert	84	4.4	+0.1
Majority		545	28.3	+2.6
Turnout		1,927	22.0	−3.3
Labour hold		Swing	+1.3	

==== May 2002 ====
2002
Party	Candidate	Votes	%	±%
Labour	Eugene Curley*	1,363	60.7	+3.7
Liberal Democrats	Rodney Isherwood	786	35.0	−2.3
Green	Claudia French	96	4.3	−1.4
Majority		577	25.7	+6.0
Turnout		2,245	25.3	+5.7
Labour hold		Swing	+3.0	

==== May 2000 ====
2000
Party	Candidate	Votes	%	±%
Labour	Mark Hackett*	924	57.0	−4.9
Liberal Democrats	Rodney Isherwood	605	37.3	+12.2
Green	Claudia French	92	5.7	+5.7
Majority		319	19.7	−17.2
Turnout		1,621	19.6	+0.4
Labour hold		Swing	-8.5	

=== Elections in 1990s ===
==== May 1999 ====
1999
Party	Candidate	Votes	%	±%
Labour	Eric Hobin*	1,023	61.9	−3.5
Liberal Democrats	Rodney Isherwood	414	25.1	+5.6
Conservative	Vivienne Clarke	215	13.0	−2.7
Majority		609	36.9	−9.1
Turnout		1,652	19.2	
Labour hold		Swing	-4.5	

==== May 1998 ====
1998
Party	Candidate	Votes	%	±%
Labour	Basil Curley*	1,083	65.4	−10.8
Liberal Democrats	Rodney Isherwood	322	19.5	+10.2
Conservative	Christine Saunders	260	15.7	+3.3
Majority		761	46.0	−17.8
Turnout		1,655		
Labour hold		Swing	-10.5	

==== May 1996 ====
1996
Party	Candidate	Votes	%	±%
Labour	Mark Hackett*	1,635	76.2	−0.2
Conservative	Christine Saunders	266	12.4	−0.7
Liberal Democrats	Vera Towers	200	9.3	+0.6
Residents	H. Baker	44	2.1	+2.1
Majority		1,369	63.8	+0.4
Turnout		2,145		
Labour hold		Swing	+0.2	

==== May 1995 ====
1995
Party	Candidate	Votes	%	±%
Labour	Eric Hobin	1,873	76.4	+5.3
Conservative	Christine Saunders	320	13.1	−2.5
Liberal Democrats	Robert West	212	8.7	−4.6
Independent	J. Miller	45	1.8	+1.8
Majority		1,553	63.4	+8.0
Turnout		2,450		
Labour hold		Swing	+3.9	

==== May 1994 ====
1994
Party	Candidate	Votes	%	±%
Labour	E. Curley*	2,049	71.1	+17.6
Conservative	C. Saunders	451	15.6	−21.3
Liberal Democrats	J. Parkinson	382	13.3	+3.7
Majority		1,598	55.4	+38.8
Turnout		2,882		
Labour hold		Swing	+19.4	

==== May 1992 ====
1992 (2 vacancies)
Party	Candidate	Votes	%	±%
Labour	M. Hackett	1,294	53.5	−1.8
Labour	E. Curley*	1,288		
Conservative	V. Clarke	892	36.9	+9.9
Conservative	H. Coombes	800		
Liberal Democrats	J. Laslett	231	9.6	−8.1
Liberal Democrats	L. Thornhill	200		
Majority		396	16.6	−11.6
Turnout		2,417		
Labour hold		Swing		
Labour hold		Swing	-5.8	

==== May 1991 ====
1991
Party	Candidate	Votes	%	±%
Labour	N. Tilley	1,835	55.3	−8.4
Conservative	F. D. Borg	898	27.0	+4.2
Liberal Democrats	J. Laslett	587	17.7	+9.7
Majority		937	28.2	−12.7
Turnout		3,320	35.0	
Labour hold		Swing	-6.3	

==== May 1990 ====
1990
Party	Candidate	Votes	%	±%
Labour	S. McCardell*	2,545	63.7	+6.3
Conservative	M. R. Birnhak	912	22.8	−11.5
Liberal Democrats	J. Laslett	320	8.0	+4.3
Green	M. A. Burns	220	5.5	+5.5
Majority		1,633	40.9	+17.8
Turnout		3,997		
Labour hold		Swing	+8.9	

=== Elections in 1980s ===
==== May 1988 ====
1988
Party	Candidate	Votes	%	±%
Labour	B. Curley	2,289	57.4	+16.2
Conservative	M. Harris	1,368	34.3	−3.4
SDP	S. Earnshaw	182	4.6	+4.6
SLD	N. Towers	148	3.7	−17.4
Majority		921	23.1	+19.5
Turnout		3,987		
Labour hold		Swing	+9.8	

==== May 1987 ====
1987
Party	Candidate	Votes	%	±%
Labour	Valerie Edwards	1,933	41.2	−22.3
Conservative	Michael Jones	1,766	37.7	+14.4
SDP	Eric Watts	990	21.1	+8.0
Majority		167	3.6	−36.6
Turnout		4,689		
Labour hold		Swing	-18.3	

==== May 1986 ====
1986
Party	Candidate	Votes	%	±%
Labour	S. McCardell	2,541	63.5	+4.1
Conservative	M. Jones	934	23.3	−6.0
SDP	E. Watts	526	13.1	+1.9
Majority		1,607	40.2	+10.1
Turnout		4,001		
Labour hold		Swing	+5.0	

==== May 1984 ====
1984
Party	Candidate	Votes	%	±%
Labour	David Ford*	2,537	59.4	+6.9
Conservative	M. Jones	1,252	29.3	−2.0
SDP	Teresa Lyons	479	11.2	−5.0
Majority		1,285	30.1	+8.9
Turnout		4,268		
Labour hold		Swing	+4.4	

==== May 1983 ====
1983
Party	Candidate	Votes	%	±%
Labour	Alan Wood*	2,362	52.5	+4.9
Conservative	Richard Smith	1,407	31.3	+0.6
SDP	John Czernenko	728	16.2	−5.5
Majority		955	21.2	+4.2
Turnout		4,497		
Labour hold		Swing	+2.1	

==== May 1982 ====
1982 (3 vacancies; new boundaries)
Party	Candidate	Votes	%	±%
Labour	Hugh Lee	1,926	44.8	
Labour	David Ford	1,879	43.7	
Labour	Alan Wood	1,782	41.4	
Conservative	Sandra Cartwright	1,240	28.8	
Conservative	Arthur Ashmore	1,179	27.4	
Conservative	John Grimshaw	1,171	27.2	
SDP	Sydney Earnshaw	876	20.4	
SDP	Agnes Hart	737	17.1	
SDP	Myra Landsman	719	16.7	
Majority		542	12.6	
Turnout		4,303	41.0	
Labour win (new seat)				
Labour win (new seat)				
Labour win (new seat)				

==== May 1980 ====
1980
Party	Candidate	Votes	%	±%
Labour	N. Morris*	2,608	62.2	+11.0
Conservative	C. Maffei	1,348	32.1	−8.0
Liberal	J. Mawson	239	5.7	−3.0
Majority		1,260	30.0	+18.8
Turnout		4,195	42.9	−33.8
Labour hold		Swing	+9.5	

=== Elections in 1970s ===
==== May 1979 ====
1979
Party	Candidate	Votes	%	±%
Labour	G. Stringer	3,802	51.2	+2.8
Conservative	J. Hood*	2,974	40.1	−5.1
Liberal	E. V. Roberts	648	8.7	+5.2
Majority		828	11.2	+8.0
Turnout		7,424	76.7	+32.2
Labour gain from Conservative		Swing	+3.9	

==== May 1978 ====
1978
Party	Candidate	Votes	%	±%
Labour	L. Kelly*	2,146	48.4	−3.3
Conservative	C. Maffei	2,002	45.2	+3.0
Liberal	N. Towers	155	3.5	−2.6
National Front	W. E. Caffrey	91	2.1	+2.1
Communist	S. Cole	40	0.9	+0.9
Majority		144	3.2	−6.3
Turnout		4,434	44.5	
Labour hold		Swing	-3.1	

==== May 1976 ====
1976
Party	Candidate	Votes	%	±%
Labour	N. Morris*	2,458	51.7	+4.1
Conservative	W. Guy	2,006	42.2	−10.2
Liberal	J. Laslett	289	6.1	+6.1
Majority		452	9.5	
Turnout		4,753		
Labour hold		Swing	+7.1	

==== May 1975 ====
1975
Party	Candidate	Votes	%	±%
Conservative	J. Hood	1,640	52.4	+12.0
Labour	S. Silverman*	1,488	47.6	−12.0
Majority		152	4.8	
Turnout		3,128		
Conservative gain from Labour		Swing	+12.0	

==== May 1973 ====
1973 (3 vacancies; reorganisation)
Party	Candidate	Votes	%	±%
Labour	L. Kelly*	1,720	59.8	+1.7
Labour	N. Morris*	1,660	57.7	−0.4
Labour	S. C. Silverman*	1,609	55.9	−2.2
Conservative	D. F. Silverman	1,166	40.5	+0.6
Conservative	N. Green	1,120	38.9	−1.0
Conservative	A. E. Cleworth	1,052	36.6	−3.3
Majority		443	15.4	−2.8
Turnout		2,876		
Labour hold		Swing		
Labour hold		Swing		
Labour hold		Swing		

==== May 1972 ====
1972
Party	Candidate	Votes	%	±%
Labour	S. C. Silverman*	2,067	58.1	−5.9
Conservative	D. F. Silverman	1,420	39.9	+7.4
Communist	R. L. Cole	72	2.0	−1.5
Majority		647	18.2	−9.7
Turnout		3,559		
Labour hold		Swing		

==== May 1971 ====
1971 (3 vacancies)
Party	Candidate	Votes	%	±%
Labour	L. Kelly	2,550	64.0	
Labour	J. S. Goldstone*	2,466	61.9	
Labour	S. C. Silverman	2,405	60.4	
Conservative	L. H. Neild	1,293	32.5	
Conservative	A. W. Ash	1,256	31.5	
Conservative	R. E. Doweck	1,207	30.3	
Liberal	J. M. Ashley	635	15.9	
Communist	R. L. Cole	138	3.5	
Majority		1,112	27.9	
Turnout		3,983		
Labour win (new seat)				
Labour win (new seat)				
Labour win (new seat)				

== See also ==
- Manchester City Council
- Manchester City Council elections
