= 1982 Manchester City Council election =

1982 UK local government election

- 6 May 1982

99 of 99 seats to Manchester City Council 50 seats needed for a majority
	First party	Second party	Third party
Leader	Bill Egerton	Cecil Franks	Audrey Jones
Party	Labour	Conservative	Alliance
Leader's seat	Beswick and Clayton	Chorlton	Withington
Last election	30 seats, 57.0%	4 seats, 32.1%	1 seats, 10.2%
Seats before	67	23	9
Seats won	69	26	4
Seats after	69	26	4
Seat change	▲2	▲3	▼5
Popular vote	175,762	121,324	85,363
Percentage	45.9%	31.7%	22.3%
Swing	▼11.1%	▼0.4%	▲12.1%
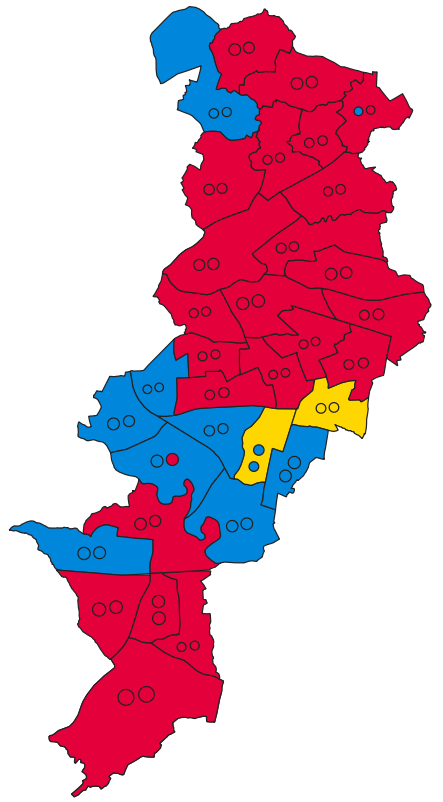
- Map of results of 1982 election
Leader of the Council before election
Norman Morris
Labour
Leader of the Council after election
Bill Egerton
Labour

Elections to Manchester Council were held on Thursday, 6 May 1982. Due to demographic changes in the city since the formation of the new City Council in 1973, and in common with some other English councils in 1982, substantial boundary changes to all wards were implemented in time for these elections. The most notable changes were as follows:

- The wards of Collegiate Church and Miles Platting were merged, with most of their combined areas forming a new Central ward.

- A new ward of Benchill was carved out of the existing wards of Baguley, Crossacres, and Woodhouse Park.

- Beswick ward became the new Beswick and Clayton ward.

- Lloyd Street ward became the new Fallowfield ward.

- Crossacres ward became the new Sharston ward.

- Alexandra ward became the new Whalley Range ward.

Due to these changes, it was necessary for the whole council to be re-elected. Each ward elected three candidates, with the first-placed candidate serving a four-year term of office, expiring in 1986, the second-placed candidate serving a two-year term of office, expiring in 1984, and the third-placed candidate serving a one-year term of office, expiring in 1983. The Labour party retained overall control of the council.

== Election result ==
Party	Votes		Seats		
Labour Party	175,762 (45.9%)	▼11.1	69 (69.7%)	69 / 99	▼3
Conservative Party	121,324 (31.7%)	▼0.4	26 (26.3%)	26 / 99	▲3
Alliance	85,363 (22.3%)	▲12.1	4 (4.0%)	4 / 99	Steady
Independent	483 (0.1%)	▼0.1	0 (0.0%)	0 / 99	Steady
National Front	166 (0.0%)	N/A	0 (0.0%)	0 / 99	N/A
Workers Revolutionary	106 (0.0%)	N/A	0 (0.0%)	0 / 99	N/A

↓
69	4	26

== Ward results ==
=== Ardwick ===
Ardwick
Party	Candidate	Votes	%	±%
Labour	Hugh Barrett*	1,936	67.9	
Labour	Frank Dale*	1,870	65.6	
Labour	Norman Finley*	1,806	63.3	
Conservative	Arthur Davies	422	14.8	
Conservative	John Alblas	389	13.6	
Conservative	Ian Savell	374	13.1	
Liberal	Delsya Redford	323	11.3	
Liberal	John Smith	314	11.0	
Liberal	Gunther Kloss	295	10.3	
Majority		1,384	48.5	
Turnout		2,851	27.4	
Labour win (new seat)				
Labour win (new seat)				
Labour win (new seat)				

=== Baguley ===
Baguley
Party	Candidate	Votes	%	±%
Labour	Frances Done*	2,261	51.9	
Labour	Anthony Burns*	2,160	49.6	
Labour	Winifred Smith	2,080	47.7	
Conservative	Christopher Ennis	1,009	23.2	
Conservative	Patricia Fitzsimons	936	21.5	
Conservative	Dorothy Hurst	867	19.9	
Liberal	Leeming Griffiths	844	19.4	
Liberal	Georgina Hall	814	18.7	
Liberal	Muriel James	695	16.0	
Majority		1,071	24.6	
Turnout		4,357	41.0	
Labour win (new seat)				
Labour win (new seat)				
Labour win (new seat)				

=== Barlow Moor ===
Barlow Moor
Party	Candidate	Votes	%	±%
Conservative	Harold Tucker*	1,546	35.6	
Conservative	Henry Moore*	1,533	35.3	
Labour	Christopher Tucker	1,522	35.1	
Labour	Keith Bradley	1,480	34.1	
Labour	Rhona Graham	1,468	33.8	
Conservative	Beryl Moore	1,464	33.8	
SDP	Fred Balcombe*	1,030	23.7	
SDP	Glenna Robson	975	22.5	
SDP	Trevor Thomas*	900	20.8	
Majority		42	1.0	
Turnout		4,337	39.9	
Conservative win (new seat)				
Conservative win (new seat)				
Labour win (new seat)				

=== Benchill ===
Benchill
Party	Candidate	Votes	%	±%
Labour	Alfred Home	2,136	58.8	
Labour	Veronica Myers	2,125	58.5	
Labour	Neil Warren	2,050	56.4	
Liberal	Herbert Griffiths	827	22.8	
Liberal	Gilbert Stacey	751	20.7	
Liberal	Bridget Brannan	679	18.7	
Conservative	Valerie Corrigan	460	12.7	
Conservative	David Harrington	437	12.0	
Conservative	Tracey Dennett	422	11.6	
Majority		1,223	33.7	
Turnout		3,634	35.9	
Labour win (new seat)				
Labour win (new seat)				
Labour win (new seat)				

=== Beswick and Clayton ===
Beswick and Clayton
Party	Candidate	Votes	%	±%
Labour	Bill Egerton	2,167	65.4	
Labour	Jack Flanagan*	2,116	63.9	
Labour	Sidney Silverman*	1,979	59.7	
Conservative	Leonard Hockey	710	21.4	
Conservative	Keith West	536	16.2	
Conservative	Joan Swatton	533	16.1	
SDP	Susan Birtwistle	318	9.6	
SDP	Charles Hill	276	8.3	
SDP	Ruth Levy	251	7.6	
Majority		1,269	38.3	
Turnout		3,314	36.5	
Labour win (new seat)				
Labour win (new seat)				
Labour win (new seat)				

=== Blackley ===
Blackley
Party	Candidate	Votes	%	±%
Labour	George Chadwick*	2,307	56.0	
Labour	Edward Newman*	2,210	53.6	
Labour	Eileen Kelly	2,159	52.4	
Conservative	Valerie Hall	1,097	26.6	
Conservative	Paul Soden	979	23.8	
Conservative	Brian Whaite	961	23.3	
Liberal	Norman Towers	528	12.8	
Liberal	John Cookson	517	12.5	
Liberal	David Gordon	507	12.3	
Majority		1,062	25.8	
Turnout		4,121	41.1	
Labour win (new seat)				
Labour win (new seat)				
Labour win (new seat)				

=== Bradford ===
Bradford
Party	Candidate	Votes	%	±%
Labour	John Gilmore*	2,190	67.1	
Labour	Edward Grant*	2,064	63.3	
Labour	Michael Harrison	1,928	59.1	
Conservative	David Eager	579	17.7	
Conservative	Geoffrey Glover	518	15.9	
Conservative	Stephen Ellwood	502	15.4	
Liberal	Charles Harris	417	12.8	
Liberal	Colin Dowse	354	10.8	
SDP	Peter Crichton-Gold	344	10.5	
Majority		1,349	41.3	
Turnout		3,263	33.6	
Labour win (new seat)				
Labour win (new seat)				
Labour win (new seat)				

=== Brooklands ===
Brooklands
Party	Candidate	Votes	%	±%
Conservative	Yvonne Emery*	2,232	45.1	
Conservative	Arthur O'Connor	2,098	42.4	
Conservative	David Sumberg	2,047	41.3	
Labour	Roger Delahunty	1,699	34.3	
Labour	Richard Reddington	1,627	32.9	
Labour	Harold Reid	1,621	32.7	
SDP	Jeffrey Burton	983	19.9	
SDP	Lawrence Shields	943	19.0	
SDP	Barry McColgan	941	19.0	
Majority		348	7.0	
Turnout		4,952	49.6	
Conservative win (new seat)				
Conservative win (new seat)				
Conservative win (new seat)				

=== Burnage ===
Burnage
Party	Candidate	Votes	%	±%
Conservative	John Kershaw	1,924	37.7	
Conservative	Horace Platt*	1,920	37.6	
Conservative	Ronald Nicholson	1,892	37.0	
Labour	Graham Martin*	1,743	34.1	
Labour	Marilyn Taylor	1,721	33.7	
Labour	John Wilson	1,618	31.7	
SDP	Christopher Muir	1,116	21.8	
SDP	Thomas Burgess	1,114	21.8	
Liberal	Margaret Boyle	1,096	21.5	
Majority		149	2.9	
Turnout		5,109	47.3	
Conservative win (new seat)				
Conservative win (new seat)				
Conservative win (new seat)				

=== Central ===
Central
Party	Candidate	Votes	%	±%
Labour	Reginald Latham*	1,713	67.7	
Labour	Gordon Conquest*	1,550	61.2	
Labour	Patricia Conquest*	1,538	60.7	
SDP	Ernest Crank	497	19.6	
SDP	Robert Young	363	14.3	
SDP	Martin Nuttall	339	13.4	
Conservative	Jean Orr	294	11.6	
Conservative	Phylis Pacey	294	11.6	
Conservative	Alexander Perman	274	10.8	
Majority		1,041	41.1	
Turnout		2,532	27.2	
Labour win (new seat)				
Labour win (new seat)				
Labour win (new seat)				

=== Charlestown ===
Charlestown
Party	Candidate	Votes	%	±%
Labour	Hugh Lee	1,926	44.8	
Labour	David Ford	1,879	43.7	
Labour	Alan Wood	1,782	41.4	
Conservative	Sandra Cartwright	1,240	28.8	
Conservative	Arthur Ashmore	1,179	27.4	
Conservative	John Grimshaw	1,171	27.2	
SDP	Sydney Earnshaw	876	20.4	
SDP	Agnes Hart	737	17.1	
SDP	Myra Landsman	719	16.7	
Majority		542	12.6	
Turnout		4,303	41.0	
Labour win (new seat)				
Labour win (new seat)				
Labour win (new seat)				

=== Cheetham ===
Cheetham
Party	Candidate	Votes	%	±%
Labour	Sally Shaw*	2,031	58.8	
Labour	John Broderick*	1,996	57.8	
Labour	Nicholas Harris	1,912	55.3	
SDP	Mohammed Aslam	775	22.4	
SDP	John Czernenko	723	20.9	
SDP	John Whitman	656	19.0	
Conservative	Russell Berg	508	14.7	
Conservative	David Philip	492	14.2	
Conservative	David Sparrow	469	13.6	
Majority		1,137	32.9	
Turnout		3,455	34.1	
Labour win (new seat)				
Labour win (new seat)				
Labour win (new seat)				

=== Chorlton ===
Chorlton
Party	Candidate	Votes	%	±%
Conservative	Leslie Sanders*	2,326	41.9	
Conservative	Maureen Vince*	2,260	40.7	
Conservative	Cecil Franks*	2,249	40.5	
Labour	Michael Ash-Edwards	1,595	28.7	
Labour	Beverley Watson	1,538	27.7	
Labour	Stephen Darroch	1,478	26.6	
Liberal	John Commons	1,390	25.0	
SDP	Mary James	1,301	23.4	
SDP	Michael Palmer	1,235	22.2	
Majority		654	11.8	
Turnout		5,555	50.4	
Conservative win (new seat)				
Conservative win (new seat)				
Conservative win (new seat)				

=== Crumpsall ===
Crumpsall
Party	Candidate	Votes	%	±%
Conservative	Frederick Butler	1,822	42.6	
Conservative	Frederick Lever*	1,634	38.2	
Conservative	George Fildes*	1,577	36.8	
Labour	Basil Curley	1,341	31.3	
Labour	Richard Jones	1,333	31.1	
Labour	Kenneth Barnes	1,332	31.1	
SDP	Gerald Landsman	980	22.9	
SDP	Brian Gibbons	944	22.0	
SDP	Teresa Lyons	857	20.0	
Majority		236	5.5	
Turnout		4,282	45.2	
Conservative win (new seat)				
Conservative win (new seat)				
Conservative win (new seat)				

=== Didsbury ===
Didsbury
Party	Candidate	Votes	%	±%
Conservative	Joyce Hill*	2,912	49.1	
Conservative	John Duke*	2,903	49.0	
Conservative	Muriel Crawford*	2,826	47.7	
SDP	Bernard Lever	1,911	32.2	
Liberal	Ronald Axtell	1,725	29.1	
Liberal	Jack Edwards	1,723	29.1	
Labour	Helen Gregory	970	16.4	
Labour	Vivien Prendiville	946	16.0	
Labour	Richard Ramsden	923	15.6	
Majority		915	15.4	
Turnout		5,927	53.7	
Conservative win (new seat)				
Conservative win (new seat)				
Conservative win (new seat)				

=== Fallowfield ===
Fallowfield
Party	Candidate	Votes	%	±%
Labour	Peter Morrison	1,696	39.1	
Labour	Joseph Holly	1,649	38.0	
Labour	Philip Openshaw	1,574	36.3	
Conservative	Paul Hackett	1,412	32.6	
Conservative	George Taylor	1,363	31.4	
Conservative	John Hardman	1,342	31.0	
SDP	Robert Davison	1,067	24.6	
SDP	James Bradley*	1,062	24.5	
SDP	Kenneth McKeon*	1,016	23.4	
Majority		162	3.7	
Turnout		4,335	38.5	
Labour win (new seat)				
Labour win (new seat)				
Labour win (new seat)				

=== Gorton North ===
Gorton North
Party	Candidate	Votes	%	±%
Labour	Colin Brierley*	2,280	49.2	
Labour	Thomas Hamnett*	2,221	47.9	
Labour	Peter Hildrew*	2,116	45.6	
SDP	Gerard Collins	1,168	25.2	
SDP	Zygmunt Gazdecki	1,130	24.4	
SDP	James Rowan	1,068	23.0	
Conservative	Agnes Caroll	950	20.5	
Conservative	Elizabeth Dimmock	901	19.4	
Conservative	Veronica Jones	884	19.1	
Majority		948	20.4	
Turnout		4,637	42.7	
Labour win (new seat)				
Labour win (new seat)				
Labour win (new seat)				

=== Gorton South ===
Gorton South
Party	Candidate	Votes	%	±%
Labour	Dennis Barker*	1,880	48.1	
Labour	Kenneth Franklin*	1,766	45.2	
Labour	Valerie Stevens	1,676	42.9	
Conservative	Ronald Beaman	955	24.4	
Liberal	John Redfern	931	23.8	
Liberal	Elsie Hooper	923	23.6	
Liberal	Carole Helme	882	22.6	
Conservative	Peter Dunne	858	22.0	
Conservative	Clive Webb	824	21.1	
National Front	Alfred Coles	70	1.8	
National Front	John Hulse	52	1.3	
National Front	Bryan Nylan	44	1.1	
Majority		721	18.5	
Turnout		3,908	36.2	
Labour win (new seat)				
Labour win (new seat)				
Labour win (new seat)				

=== Harpurhey ===
Harpurhey
Party	Candidate	Votes	%	±%
Labour	Patrick Karney	1,839	55.7	
Labour	Graham Stringer	1,712	51.9	
Labour	Nilofar Siddiqi	1,656	50.2	
Conservative	Joyce Harding	862	26.1	
Conservative	Norman Jones	831	25.2	
Conservative	Richard Smith	785	23.8	
SDP	Edward Charnley	598	18.1	
SDP	Anthony Newman	595	18.0	
SDP	Thomas Jones	547	16.6	
Majority		794	24.1	
Turnout		3,299	38.6	
Labour win (new seat)				
Labour win (new seat)				
Labour win (new seat)				

=== Hulme ===
Hulme
Party	Candidate	Votes	%	±%
Labour	Peter Keenlyside	2,105	60.9	
Labour	Valerie Dunn	1,992	57.7	
Labour	Sheila Robertson	1,931	55.9	
Liberal	Thomas McClure	811	23.5	
Liberal	Robert Taylor	707	20.5	
Liberal	David Nicholson	670	19.4	
Conservative	Grant Higginson	421	12.2	
Conservative	Peter Hardman	413	12.0	
Conservative	Clare Hare	388	11.2	
Majority		1,120	32.4	
Turnout		3,455	30.6	
Labour win (new seat)				
Labour win (new seat)				
Labour win (new seat)				

=== Levenshulme ===
Levenshulme
Party	Candidate	Votes	%	±%
Liberal	Keith Whitmore*	2,029	41.8	
Liberal	Janet Blessing	1,792	36.9	
Liberal	Howard Smith*	1,743	35.9	
Conservative	John Barber*	1,573	32.4	
Conservative	Winifrede Carlton	1,484	30.6	
Conservative	John Monks	1,394	28.7	
Labour	Alison Jones	1,200	24.7	
Labour	John Rimington	1,189	24.5	
Labour	Rachel Pollard	1,177	24.3	
Majority		170	3.5	
Turnout		4,851	47.5	
Liberal win (new seat)				
Liberal win (new seat)				
Liberal win (new seat)				

=== Lightbowne ===
Lightbowne
Party	Candidate	Votes	%	±%
Labour	Paul Murphy*	2,145	44.4	
Labour	Alison Kelly*	1,952	40.4	
Labour	Derek Shaw	1,950	40.4	
Conservative	Albert Bolland	1,340	27.7	
Conservative	Vincent Clare	1,333	27.6	
Conservative	Grace Cleworth	1,315	27.2	
Liberal	Frederick Pinder	1,184	24.5	
Liberal	James Ashley	1,168	24.2	
Liberal	Elizabeth Thompson	1,043	21.6	
Independent	George Croston	147	3.0	
Majority		610	12.7	
Turnout		4,831	47.6	
Labour win (new seat)				
Labour win (new seat)				
Labour win (new seat)				

=== Longsight ===
Longsight
Party	Candidate	Votes	%	±%
Labour	John Byrne	1,875	43.5	
Labour	Kathleen Robinson	1,787	41.4	
Labour	Kenneth Strath	1,650	38.3	
SDP	Altaf Ahmed	1,394	32.3	
SDP	George Nevins	911	21.1	
SDP	Joseph Podbylski	798	18.5	
Conservative	Nigel Davidson	741	17.2	
Conservative	John Watson	736	17.1	
Conservative	William O'Grady	688	16.0	
Independent	Geoffrey Chandler	199	4.6	
Majority		256	6.0	
Turnout		4,313	36.6	
Labour win (new seat)				
Labour win (new seat)				
Labour win (new seat)				

=== Moss Side ===
Moss Side
Party	Candidate	Votes	%	±%
Labour	Hugh Paget*	2,285	61.5	
Labour	Arnold Spencer	2,123	57.1	
Labour	Jeffrey Wilner*	1,969	53.0	
Conservative	Robert Taylor	863	23.2	
Conservative	Mary Barnes	795	21.4	
Conservative	Joan Goldsby	758	20.4	
Liberal	Sarah Barber	400	10.8	
SDP	Norman Allen	380	10.2	
Liberal	Lauriston Ford	362	9.7	
Workers Revolutionary	Frederick Marshall	106	2.9	
Majority		1,106	29.8	
Turnout		3,718	35.7	
Labour win (new seat)				
Labour win (new seat)				
Labour win (new seat)				

=== Moston ===
Moston
Party	Candidate	Votes	%	±%
Labour	Colin McLaren*	2,220	42.5	
Conservative	Kenneth Goulding	2,054	39.3	
Labour	William Risby	2,024	38.7	
Labour	Leonard Kelly	2,022	38.7	
Conservative	Gwendoline Hurley*	1,904	36.4	
Conservative	Gerald Carey	1,839	35.2	
Liberal	John Bailey	881	16.9	
Liberal	John Gradwell	808	15.5	
Liberal	Martin Gradwell	792	13.9	
Majority		2	0.0	
Turnout		5,228	49.9	
Labour win (new seat)				
Conservative win (new seat)				
Labour win (new seat)				

=== Newton Heath ===
Newton Heath
Party	Candidate	Votes	%	±%
Labour	Clifford Tomlinson*	1,933	58.0	
Labour	John Smith*	1,925	57.8	
Labour	Michael Taylor*	1,875	56.3	
Conservative	David Booth	755	22.7	
Conservative	Stephen Johnson	672	20.2	
Conservative	Kenneth Leeson	616	18.5	
Liberal	Joyce Laslett	389	11.7	
Liberal	Vera Towers	352	10.6	
Liberal	Geoffrey Mawson	344	10.3	
Majority		1,120	33.6	
Turnout		3,332	33.8	
Labour win (new seat)				
Labour win (new seat)				
Labour win (new seat)				

=== Northenden ===
Northenden
Party	Candidate	Votes	%	±%
Labour	Keith Barnes	1,954	39.8	
Labour	Harold Brown	1,890	38.5	
Labour	Duncan Healey	1,881	38.3	
Conservative	George Leigh*	1,865	38.0	
Conservative	Dorothy Mountford	1,694	34.5	
Conservative	John Graham	1,639	33.4	
Liberal	John Holland	911	18.6	
Liberal	Julian Goldstone	888	18.1	
Liberal	Kenneth Lightowler	842	17.2	
Independent	Stanley Rose	137	2.8	
Majority		16	0.3	
Turnout		4,907	47.2	
Labour win (new seat)				
Labour win (new seat)				
Labour win (new seat)				

=== Old Moat ===
Old Moat
Party	Candidate	Votes	%	±%
Conservative	William Aikman*	2,053	40.6	
Conservative	Gerard Fitzsimons	1,924	38.1	
Conservative	Peter Hilton	1,888	37.4	
Labour	Trevor Allcock	1,649	32.6	
Labour	Deborah Bryson	1,520	30.1	
Labour	Roy Walters	1,493	29.6	
Liberal	Pamela Elwood	1,213	24.0	
Liberal	Anthony Parkinson	1,199	23.7	
Liberal	John Stevenson	1,148	22.7	
Majority		239	4.7	
Turnout		5,052	45.0	
Conservative win (new seat)				
Conservative win (new seat)				
Conservative win (new seat)				

=== Rusholme ===
Rusholme
Party	Candidate	Votes	%	±%
Labour	Thomas Egan	1,926	42.6	
Labour	John Nicholson*	1,895	41.9	
Labour	Margaret Roff	1,823	40.3	
Conservative	Shakir Hussain	1,484	32.8	
Conservative	Alan Catchpole	1,350	29.8	
Conservative	Catherine McQuade	1,313	29.0	
Liberal	Peter Thompson	947	20.9	
Liberal	Audrey Greaves	920	20.3	
Liberal	David Tierney	843	18.6	
Majority		339	7.5	
Turnout		4,526	44.5	
Labour win (new seat)				
Labour win (new seat)				
Labour win (new seat)				

=== Sharston ===
Sharston
Party	Candidate	Votes	%	±%
Labour	Kenneth Collis*	1,906	42.1	
Labour	Kevan Lim*	1,787	39.4	
Labour	William Jameson	1,735	38.3	
Conservative	Annie Spencer	1,329	29.3	
Conservative	Rodney Munn	1,322	29.2	
Conservative	Kathleen Hay	1,290	28.5	
SDP	Eileen Bowers	1,115	24.6	
SDP	Robert Bowers	1,112	24.5	
SDP	Angus Bateman*	1,052	23.2	
Majority		406	9.0	
Turnout		4,530	46.6	
Labour win (new seat)				
Labour win (new seat)				
Labour win (new seat)				

=== Whalley Range ===
Whalley Range
Party	Candidate	Votes	%	±%
Conservative	Robert Rodgers*	2,029	42.9	
Conservative	Andrew Neville	1,951	41.3	
Conservative	Michael Whetton	1,926	40.7	
Labour	David Grigg	1,371	29.0	
Labour	Anthony Williams	1,300	27.5	
Labour	Barclay Patoir	1,220	25.8	
SDP	Roy Jarman	1,168	24.7	
SDP	David Levy	1,057	22.4	
SDP	Simon Lewis	1,057	22.4	
Majority		555	11.7	
Turnout		4,729	48.7	
Conservative win (new seat)				
Conservative win (new seat)				
Conservative win (new seat)				

=== Withington ===
Withington
Party	Candidate	Votes	%	±%
Liberal	Audrey Jones*	2,043	40.5	
Conservative	Joan Jacobs*	1,981	39.3	
Conservative	Margaret Davies	1,854	36.7	
Liberal	David Sandiford*	1,836	36.4	
Conservative	Muriel Pierce	1,828	36.2	
Liberal	Graham Shaw	1,675	33.2	
Labour	Frank Booth	1,006	19.9	
Labour	Karl Grimshaw	991	19.6	
Labour	Adetutu Eko	929	18.4	
Majority		18	0.4	
Turnout		5,047	49.8	
Liberal win (new seat)				
Conservative win (new seat)				
Conservative win (new seat)				

=== Woodhouse Park ===
Woodhouse Park
Party	Candidate	Votes	%	±%
Labour	Gerald Hall*	2,164	59.4	
Labour	Griffith Berry*	2,062	56.6	
Labour	Thomas Farrell*	2,040	56.0	
SDP	Eileen Wildman	635	17.4	
SDP	Doreen Thomas	599	16.4	
Conservative	Constance Murphy	588	16.1	
Conservative	Joyce Norbury	581	15.9	
Conservative	Hilda Wootton	569	15.6	
SDP	Thomas Huffer	540	14.8	
Majority		1,405	38.6	
Turnout		3,643	35.6	
Labour win (new seat)				
Labour win (new seat)				
Labour win (new seat)				

== By-elections between 1982 and 1983 ==
=== Whalley Range, 16 September 1982 ===
Caused by the death of Councillor Robert Rodgers (Conservative, Whalley Range, elected 10 May 1973; previously 1936-56, Alderman 1956-73) on 7 May 1982.

Whalley Range
Party	Candidate	Votes	%	±%
Conservative	Lynia Meadowcroft	1,463	45.9	+3.0
Labour	Rhona Graham	1,048	32.9	+3.9
SDP	Mary Jones	673	21.2	−3.5
Majority		415	13.0	+1.3
Turnout		3,184	48.7	
Conservative hold		Swing		
