= Gorton South =

- Ward
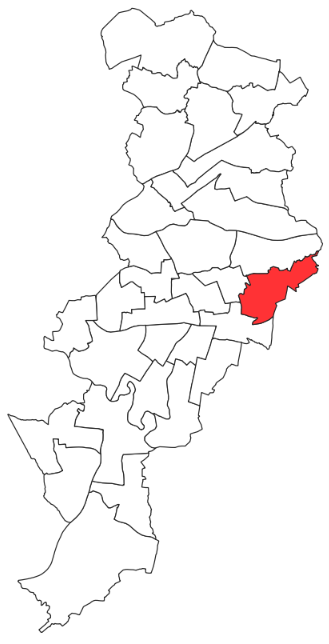
- Gorton South ward (2004) within Manchester

- Coat of arms
- Interactive map of Gorton South
- Country: United Kingdom
- Constituent country: England
- Region: North West England
- County: Greater Manchester
- Metropolitan borough: Manchester
- Created: November 1909
- Named for: Gorton

Government
  - Type: Unicameral
  - Body: Manchester City Council
- UK Parliamentary Constituency: Manchester Gorton

Gorton South was an electoral division of Manchester City Council which was represented from 1909 until 2018. It covered parts of Gorton and Levenshulme in East Manchester.

== Overview ==
Gorton South ward was created in 1909, as a result of the Manchester Extension Scheme 1909, which transferred the urban districts of Gorton and Levenshulme to the Manchester corporation. Its initial boundaries were unaffected by city-wide boundary revisions in 1919. After boundary revisions in 1950, the ward's northern boundary became Hyde Road, further revisions in 1971 left the ward's boundaries in place. In 1982, a large part of Levenshulme was transferred to the ward from the Levenshulme ward. Following another boundary revision in 2004, the ward's northern boundary became the Gore Brook. In 2018, the ward was abolished, and its remaining area was divided between the new Gorton and Abbey Hey ward and the Levenshulme and Longsight wards.

From 1909 until 1918, the ward formed part of the Gorton Parliamentary constituency. From 1918 until its abolition, it was part of the Manchester Gorton Parliamentary constituency.

== Councillors ==
Election	Councillor	Councillor	Councillor
1909	T. R. Day (Ind)	S. Hague (Lab)	G. A. Genny (Lib)
1910	T. R. Day (Ind)	S. Hague (Lab)	T. Lowth (Lab)
1911	T. R. Day (Ind)	S. Hague (Lab)	T. Lowth (Lab)
1912	T. R. Day (Ind)	S. Hague (Lab)	T. Lowth (Lab)
1913	T. R. Day (Ind)	S. Hague (Lab)	R. J. Davies (Lab)
1914	T. R. Day (Ind)	S. Hague (Lab)	R. J. Davies (Lab)
1919	A. Lee (Lab)	S. Hague (Lab)	R. J. Davies (Lab)
1920	A. Lee (Lab)	S. Hague (Lab)	R. J. Davies (Lab)
1921	A. Lee (Lab)	S. Hague (Lab)	R. J. Davies (Lab)
1922	A. Lee (Lab)	S. Hague (Lab)	R. J. Davies (Lab)
1923	A. Lee (Lab)	S. Hague (Lab)	E. C. Wilkinson (Lab)
1924	A. Lee (Lab)	J. Brown (Lab)	E. C. Wilkinson (Lab)
1925	A. Lee (Lab)	J. Brown (Lab)	E. C. Wilkinson (Lab)
1926	A. Lee (Lab)	J. Brown (Lab)	T. H. Adams (Lab)
1927	A. Lee (Lab)	J. Brown (Lab)	T. H. Adams (Lab)
1928	A. Lee (Lab)	J. Brown (Lab)	T. H. Adams (Lab)
1929	A. Lee (Lab)	J. Brown (Lab)	T. H. Adams (Lab)
1930	A. Lee (Lab)	J. H. Cox (Lab)	T. H. Adams (Lab)
1931	A. Lee (Lab)	J. H. Cox (Lab)	T. H. Adams (Lab)
September 1932	A. Lee (Lab)	J. H. Cox (ILP)	T. H. Adams (Lab)
1932	A. Lee (Lab)	J. H. Cox (ILP)	T. H. Adams (Lab)
1933	A. Lee (Lab)	G. R. Leslie (Lab)	T. H. Adams (Lab)
1934	A. Lee (Lab)	G. R. Leslie (Lab)	T. H. Adams (Lab)
1935	A. Lee (Lab)	G. R. Leslie (Lab)	T. H. Adams (Lab)
July 1936	J. Sutton(Lab)	G. R. Leslie (Lab)	T. H. Adams (Lab)
1936	J. Sutton (Lab)	G. R. Leslie (Lab)	T. H. Adams (Lab)
1937	J. Sutton (Lab)	G. R. Leslie (Lab)	T. H. Adams (Lab)
1938	J. Sutton (Lab)	G. R. Leslie (Lab)	T. H. Adams (Lab)
1945	J. Sutton (Lab)	G. R. Leslie (Lab)	E. Kirkman (Lab)
1946	J. Sutton (Lab)	G. R. Leslie (Lab)	E. Kirkman (Lab)
1947	J. Sutton (Lab)	G. R. Leslie (Lab)	E. Kirkman (Lab)
1949	J. Sutton (Lab)	E. A. Yarwood (Lab)	E. Kirkman (Lab)
1950	J. Sutton (Lab)	E. A. Yarwood (Lab)	E. Kirkman (Lab)
1951	J. Sutton (Lab)	E. A. Yarwood (Lab)	E. Kirkman (Lab)
1952	J. Sutton (Lab)	E. A. Yarwood (Lab)	E. Kirkman (Lab)
1953	J. Sutton (Lab)	E. A. Yarwood (Lab)	E. Kirkman (Lab)
1954	J. Sutton (Lab)	E. A. Yarwood (Lab)	E. Kirkman (Lab)
March 1955	H. Wimbury (Lab)	E. A. Yarwood (Lab)	E. Kirkman (Lab)
1955	H. Wimbury (Lab)	E. A. Yarwood (Lab)	E. Kirkman (Lab)
March 1956	H. Wimbury (Lab)	H. J. Batson (Lab)	E. Kirkman (Lab)
1956	H. Wimbury (Lab)	H. J. Batson (Lab)	E. Kirkman (Lab)
1957	H. Wimbury (Lab)	H. J. Batson (Lab)	E. Kirkman (Lab)
1958	H. Wimbury (Lab)	H. J. Batson (Lab)	E. Kirkman (Lab)
1959	H. Wimbury (Lab)	H. J. Batson (Lab)	E. Kirkman (Lab)
1960	H. Wimbury (Lab)	H. J. Batson (Lab)	E. Kirkman (Lab)
1961	H. Wimbury (Lab)	H. J. Batson (Lab)	E. Kirkman (Lab)
1962	H. Wimbury (Lab)	H. J. Batson (Lab)	E. Kirkman (Lab)
October 1962	H. Wimbury (Lab)	H. J. Batson (Lab)	D. Barker (Lab)
1963	H. Wimbury (Lab)	H. J. Batson (Lab)	D. Barker (Lab)
1964	G. Conquest (Lab)	H. J. Batson (Lab)	D. Barker (Lab)
1965	G. Conquest (Lab)	H. J. Batson (Lab)	D. Barker (Lab)
1966	G. Conquest (Lab)	H. J. Batson (Lab)	D. Barker (Lab)
1967	G. Conquest (Lab)	D. E. Lindsey (Con)	D. Barker (Lab)
1968	L. H. Nield (Con)	D. E. Lindsey (Con)	D. Barker (Lab)
1969	L. H. Nield (Con)	D. E. Lindsey (Con)	V. R. Cattan (Con)
1970	L. H. Nield (Con)	D. Barker (Lab)	V. R. Cattan (Con)
1971	D. Barker (Lab)	H. Conway (Lab)	K. Franklin (Lab)
1972	D. Barker (Lab)	H. Conway (Lab)	K. Franklin (Lab)
1973	H. Conway (Lab)	D. Barker (Lab)	K. Franklin (Lab)
1975	H. Conway (Lab)	D. Barker (Lab)	K. Franklin (Lab)
1976	H. Conway (Lab)	D. Barker (Lab)	K. Franklin (Lab)
1978	H. Conway (Lab)	D. Barker (Lab)	K. Franklin (Lab)
1979	H. Conway (Lab)	D. Barker (Lab)	K. Franklin (Lab)
1980	H. Conway (Lab)	D. Barker (Lab)	K. Franklin (Lab)
September 1980	R. Sadler (Lab)	D. Barker (Lab)	K. Franklin (Lab)
1982	D. Barker (Lab)	K. Franklin (Lab)	V. Stevens (Lab)
1983	D. Barker (Lab)	K. Franklin (Lab)	V. Stevens (Lab)
1984	D. Barker (Lab)	N. Litherland (Lab)	V. Stevens (Lab)
1986	D. Barker (Lab)	N. Litherland (Lab)	V. Stevens (Lab)
1987	D. Barker (Lab)	N. Litherland (Lab)	J. Ashley (Lib)
August 1987	D. Barker (Lab)	J. Bridges (Lib)	J. Ashley (Lib)
1988	D. Barker (Lab)	B. Stone (Lab)	J. Ashley (SLD)
1990	D. Barker (Lab)	B. Stone (Lab)	J. Ashley (Lib Dem)
1991	D. Barker (Lab)	B. Stone (Lab)	J. Ashley (Lib Dem)
1992	D. Barker (Lab)	S. Ashley (Lib Dem)	J. Ashley (Lib Dem)
March 1993	J. Bridges (Lib Dem)	S. Ashley (Lib Dem)	J. Ashley (Lib Dem)
1994	J. Bridges (Lib Dem)	S. Ashley (Lib Dem)	J. Ashley (Lib Dem)
1995	J. Bridges (Lib Dem)	S. Ashley (Lib Dem)	J. Ashley (Lib Dem)
1996	J. Bridges (Lib Dem)	S. Ashley (Lib Dem)	J. Ashley (Lib Dem)
1998	J. Bridges (Lib Dem)	S. Ashley (Lib Dem)	J. Ashley (Lib Dem)
1999	J. Bridges (Lib Dem)	S. Ashley (Lib Dem)	J. Ashley (Lib Dem)
2000	J. Bridges (Lib Dem)	S. Ashley (Lib Dem)	J. Ashley (Lib Dem)
2002	J. Bridges (Lib Dem)	S. Ashley (Lib Dem)	J. Ashley (Lib Dem)
2003	J. Bridges (Lib Dem)	S. Ashley (Lib Dem)	J. Ashley (Lib Dem)
2004	James Ashley (Lib Dem)	Simon Ashley (Lib Dem)	John Bridges (Lib Dem)
2006	James Ashley (Lib Dem)	Simon Ashley (Lib Dem)	John Bridges (Lib Dem)
October 2006	Charles Glover (Lib Dem)	Simon Ashley (Lib Dem)	John Bridges (Lib Dem)
2007	Charles Glover (Lib Dem)	Simon Ashley (Lib Dem)	John Bridges (Lib Dem)
2008	Charles Glover (Lib Dem)	Simon Ashley (Lib Dem)	John Bridges (Lib Dem)
2010	Charles Glover (Lib Dem)	Simon Ashley (Lib Dem)	Julie Reid (Lab)
2011	Charles Glover (Lib Dem)	Peter Cookson (Lab)	Julie Reid (Lab)
2012	Bernard Stone (Lab)	Peter Cookson (Lab)	Julie Reid (Lab)
2014	Bernard Stone (Lab)	Peter Cookson (Lab)	Julie Reid (Lab)
2015	Bernard Stone (Lab)	Peter Cookson (Lab)	Julie Reid (Lab)
2016	Bernard Stone (Lab)	Peter Cookson (Lab)	Julie Reid (Lab)

== Elections ==
=== Elections in 1900s ===
==== November 1909 ====
1909 (3 vacancies)
Party	Candidate	Votes	%	±%
Independent	T. R. Day	1,181	63.6	
Labour	S. Hague	1,012	54.5	
Liberal	G. A. Genny	964	51.9	
Labour	T. Goddard	723	38.9	
Labour	W. Gregory	619	33.3	
Majority		241	13.0	
Turnout		1,858		
Independent win (new seat)				
Labour win (new seat)				
Liberal win (new seat)				

=== Elections in 1910s ===
==== November 1910 ====
1910
Party	Candidate	Votes	%	±%
Labour	T. Lowth	870	56.1	+1.6
Independent	M. Bushell	681	43.9	N/A
Majority		189	12.2	
Turnout		1,551		
Labour gain from Liberal		Swing		

==== November 1911 ====
1911
Party	Candidate	Votes	%	±%
Labour	S. Hague*	1,031	60.4	+4.3
Conservative	J. A. Lofts	676	39.6	N/A
Majority		355	20.8	+8.6
Turnout		1,707		
Labour hold		Swing		

==== November 1912 ====
1912
Party	Candidate	Votes	%	±%
Independent	T. R. Day*	uncontested		
Independent hold		Swing		

==== November 1913 ====
1913
Party	Candidate	Votes	%	±%
Labour	R. J. Davies	915	55.0	N/A
Independent	J. Carpenter	748	45.0	N/A
Majority		167	10.0	N/A
Turnout		1,663		
Labour hold		Swing		

==== November 1914 ====
1914
Party	Candidate	Votes	%	±%
Labour	S. Hague*	uncontested		
Labour hold		Swing		

==== November 1919 ====
1919 (new boundaries)
Party	Candidate	Votes	%	±%
Labour	A. Lee	1,875	54.6	
Independent	T. R. Day*	1,562	45.4	
Majority		313	9.1	
Turnout		3,437	37.1	
Labour gain from Independent		Swing		

=== Elections in 1920s ===
==== November 1920 ====
1920
Party	Candidate	Votes	%	±%
Labour	R. J. Davies*	2,174	51.8	−23.6
Conservative	J. H. B. Grimshaw	2,026	48.2	N/A
Majority		148	3.5	−47.3
Turnout		4,200	45.3	+15.3
Labour hold		Swing		

==== November 1921 ====
1921
Party	Candidate	Votes	%	±%
Labour	S. Hague*	3,372	58.0	+6.2
Conservative	W. S. Wilson	2,060	35.4	−12.8
National Unemployed Workers' Movement	P. H. Kealy	385	6.6	N/A
Majority		1,312	22.6	+19.1
Turnout		5,817	62.5	+17.2
Labour hold		Swing		

==== November 1922 ====
1922
Party	Candidate	Votes	%	±%
Labour	A. Lee*	3,185	54.9	−3.1
Conservative	J. E. Leicester	2,617	45.1	+9.7
Majority		568	9.8	−12.8
Turnout		5,802	59.0	−3.5
Labour hold		Swing		

==== November 1923 ====
1923
Party	Candidate	Votes	%	±%
Labour	E. C. Wilkinson	3,341	57.2	+2.3
Conservative	J. E. Leicester	2,501	42.8	−2.3
Majority		841	14.4	+4.6
Turnout		5,842		
Labour hold		Swing		

==== November 1924 ====
1924
Party	Candidate	Votes	%	±%
Labour	J. Brown	3,354	55.7	−1.5
Conservative	C. J. Willis	2,627	43.6	+0.8
National Unemployed Workers' Movement	W. Stopford	40	0.7	N/A
Majority		727	12.1	−2.3
Turnout		6,021		
Labour hold		Swing		

==== November 1925 ====
1925
Party	Candidate	Votes	%	±%
Labour	A. Lee*	uncontested		
Labour hold		Swing		

==== November 1926 ====
1926
Party	Candidate	Votes	%	±%
Labour	T. H. Adams	3,752	61.0	N/A
Conservative	F. Earley	2,398	39.0	N/A
Majority		1,354	22.0	N/A
Turnout		6,150	56.8	N/A
Labour hold		Swing		

==== November 1927 ====
1927
Party	Candidate	Votes	%	±%
Labour	J. Brown*	3,365	66.5	+5.5
Liberal	J. H. Stopford	1,694	33.5	N/A
Majority		1,671	33.0	+11.0
Turnout		5,059	46.4	−10.4
Labour hold		Swing		

==== November 1928 ====
1928
Party	Candidate	Votes	%	±%
Labour	A. Lee*	3,960	66.0	−0.5
Conservative	A. Ireland	1,985	33.1	N/A
Residents	A. Owen	55	0.9	N/A
Majority		1,975	32.9	−1.0
Turnout		6,000	53.7	+7.3
Labour hold		Swing		

==== November 1929 ====
1929
Party	Candidate	Votes	%	±%
Labour	T. H. Adams*	3,237	69.1	+3.1
Conservative	C. Taylor	1,445	30.9	−2.2
Majority		1,792	38.2	+5.3
Turnout		6,000	37.8	−15.9
Labour hold		Swing		

=== Elections in 1930s ===
==== November 1930 ====
1930
Party	Candidate	Votes	%	±%
Labour	J. H. Cox	2,662	53.2	−15.9
Conservative	C. Taylor	2,339	46.8	+15.9
Majority		323	6.4	−31.8
Turnout		5,001		
Labour hold		Swing		

==== November 1931 ====
1931
Party	Candidate	Votes	%	±%
Labour	A. Lee*	3,683	51.9	−1.3
Conservative	E. Appleton	3,410	48.1	+1.3
Majority		273	3.8	−2.6
Turnout		7,093	56.4	
Labour hold		Swing		

==== November 1932 ====
1932
Party	Candidate	Votes	%	±%
Labour	T. H. Adams*	4,446	68.9	+17.0
Conservative	E. Appleton	2,005	31.1	−17.0
Majority		2,441	37.8	+34.0
Turnout		6,451		
Labour hold		Swing		

==== November 1933 ====
1933
Party	Candidate	Votes	%	±%
Labour	G. R. Leslie	3,769	77.6	+8.8
Independent	E. Appleton	1,090	22.4	N/A
Majority		2,679	55.2	+17.4
Turnout		4,859		
Labour gain from Ind. Labour Party		Swing		

==== November 1934 ====
1934
Party	Candidate	Votes	%	±%
Labour	A. Lee*	4,149	69.0	−8.6
Conservative	E. Shaw	1,862	31.0	N/A
Majority		2,287	38.0	−17.2
Turnout		6,011		
Labour hold		Swing		

==== November 1935 ====
1935
Party	Candidate	Votes	%	±%
Labour	T. H. Adams*	uncontested		
Labour hold		Swing		

==== July 1936 (by-election) ====
By-election: 2 July 1936
Party	Candidate	Votes	%	±%
Labour	J. Sutton	2,540	65.8	N/A
Conservative	E. Shaw	1,319	34.2	N/A
Majority		1,221	31.6	N/A
Turnout		3,859		
Labour hold		Swing		

==== November 1936 ====
1936
Party	Candidate	Votes	%	±%
Labour	G. R. Leslie*	3,147	62.4	N/A
Conservative	E. Shaw	1,895	37.6	N/A
Majority		1,252	24.8	N/A
Turnout		5,042		
Labour hold		Swing		

==== November 1937 ====
1937
Party	Candidate	Votes	%	±%
Labour	J. Sutton*	3,400	72.7	+10.3
Independent	E. Appleton	1,277	27.3	N/A
Majority		2,123	45.4	+20.6
Turnout		4,677		
Labour hold		Swing		

==== November 1938 ====
1938
Party	Candidate	Votes	%	±%
Labour	T. H. Adams*	3,643	93.9	+21.2
British Union	J. Simmonds	236	6.1	N/A
Majority		3,407	87.8	+42.4
Turnout		3,879		
Labour hold		Swing		

=== Elections in 1940s ===
==== November 1945 ====
1945 (2 vacancies)
Party	Candidate	Votes	%	±%
Labour	G. R. Leslie*	4,417	73.3	−20.6
Labour	E. Kirkman	4,388	72.8	−21.1
Conservative	R. A. Fieldhouse	1,610	26.7	N/A
Majority		2,778	46.1	−41.7
Turnout		6,027	31.9	
Labour hold		Swing		
Labour hold		Swing		

==== November 1946 ====
1946
Party	Candidate	Votes	%	±%
Labour	J. Sutton*	3,830	68.3	−5.0
Conservative	T. Brownrigg	1,420	25.3	−1.4
Liberal	B. Riggs	358	6.4	N/A
Majority		2,410	43.0	−3.1
Turnout		5,608		
Labour hold		Swing		

==== November 1947 ====
1947
Party	Candidate	Votes	%	±%
Labour	E. Kirkman*	5,914	57.7	−10.6
Conservative	G. J. Playford	4,344	42.3	+17.0
Majority		1,570	15.4	−27.6
Turnout		10,258		
Labour hold		Swing		

==== May 1949 ====
1949
Party	Candidate	Votes	%	±%
Labour	E. A. Yarwood	5,675	58.8	+1.1
Conservative	G. Lancaster	3,978	41.2	−1.1
Majority		1,697	17.6	+2.2
Turnout		9,653		
Labour hold		Swing		

=== Elections in 1950s ===
==== May 1950 ====
1950 (new boundaries)
Party	Candidate	Votes	%	±%
Labour	J. Sutton*	3,046	59.6	
Conservative	F. G. Thompson	1,964	38.4	
Communist	D. C. Corry	104	2.0	
Majority		1,082	21.2	
Turnout		5,114		
Labour hold		Swing		

==== May 1951 ====
1951
Party	Candidate	Votes	%	±%
Labour	E. Kirkman*	2,703	54.4	−5.2
Conservative	A. E. Owen	2,144	43.1	+4.7
Communist	A. Wilde	125	2.5	+0.5
Majority		539	11.3	−9.9
Turnout		4,972		
Labour hold		Swing		

==== May 1952 ====
1952
Party	Candidate	Votes	%	±%
Labour	E. Yarwood*	3,927	69.3	+14.9
Conservative	W. Fuller	1,741	30.7	−12.4
Majority		2,186	38.6	+27.3
Turnout		5,668		
Labour hold		Swing		

==== May 1953 ====
1953
Party	Candidate	Votes	%	±%
Labour	J. Sutton*	3,020	64.6	−4.7
Conservative	L. J. Naden	1,657	35.4	+4.7
Majority		1,363	29.2	−9.4
Turnout		4,677		
Labour hold		Swing		

==== May 1954 ====
1954
Party	Candidate	Votes	%	±%
Labour	E. Kirkman*	2,578	69.3	+4.7
Conservative	L. J. Naden	1,141	30.7	−4.7
Majority		1,437	38.6	+9.4
Turnout		3,719		
Labour hold		Swing		

==== March 1955 (by-election) ====
By-election: 24 March 1955
Party	Candidate	Votes	%	±%
Labour	H. Wimbury	1,993	56.1	−13.2
Conservative	S. Watt	1,560	43.9	+13.2
Majority		433	12.2	−26.4
Turnout		3,553		
Labour hold		Swing		

==== May 1955 ====
1955
Party	Candidate	Votes	%	±%
Labour	E. A. Yarwood*	2,234	51.8	−17.5
Conservative	D. S. Watt	2,077	48.2	+17.5
Majority		157	3.6	−35.0
Turnout		4,311		
Labour hold		Swing		

==== March 1956 (by-election) ====
By-election: 22 March 1956
Party	Candidate	Votes	%	±%
Labour	H. J. Batson	1,775	63.1	+11.3
Conservative	D. C. Walls	1,037	36.9	−11.3
Majority		738	26.2	+22.6
Turnout		2,812		
Labour hold		Swing		

==== May 1956 ====
1956
Party	Candidate	Votes	%	±%
Labour	H. Wimbury*	2,058	68.7	+16.9
Conservative	T. Brownrigg	938	31.3	−16.9
Majority		1,120	37.4	+33.8
Turnout		2,996		
Labour hold		Swing		

==== May 1957 ====
1957
Party	Candidate	Votes	%	±%
Labour	E. Kirkman*	2,229	68.3	−0.4
Conservative	T. Brownrigg	1,033	31.7	+0.4
Majority		1,196	36.6	−0.8
Turnout		3,262		
Labour hold		Swing		

==== May 1958 ====
1958
Party	Candidate	Votes	%	±%
Labour	H. J. Batson*	2,234	66.6	−1.7
Conservative	H. Woodman	1,118	33.4	+1.7
Majority		1,116	33.2	−3.4
Turnout		3,352		
Labour hold		Swing		

==== May 1959 ====
1959
Party	Candidate	Votes	%	±%
Labour	H. Wimbury*	2,254	61.3	−5.3
Conservative	H. Woodman	1,422	38.7	+5.3
Majority		832	22.6	−10.6
Turnout		3,676		
Labour hold		Swing		

=== Elections in 1960s ===
==== May 1960 ====
1960
Party	Candidate	Votes	%	±%
Labour	E. Kirkman*	1,774	55.3	−6.0
Conservative	C. M. Clarke	1,436	44.7	+6.0
Majority		338	10.6	−12.0
Turnout		3,210		
Labour hold		Swing		

==== May 1961 ====
1961
Party	Candidate	Votes	%	±%
Labour	H. J. Batson*	2,062	58.3	+3.0
Conservative	C. M. Clarke	1,476	41.7	−3.0
Majority		586	16.6	+6.0
Turnout		3,538		
Labour hold		Swing		

==== May 1962 ====
1962
Party	Candidate	Votes	%	±%
Labour	H. Wimbury*	2,362	63.6	+5.3
Conservative	C. M. Clarke	1,351	36.4	−5.3
Majority		1,011	27.2	+10.6
Turnout		3,713		
Labour hold		Swing		

==== October 1962 (by-election) ====
By-election: 18 October 1962
Party	Candidate	Votes	%	±%
Labour	D. Barker	1,806	59.2	−4.4
Liberal	P. A. G. Sharp	648	21.2	N/A
Conservative	J. Whitwell	598	19.6	−16.8
Majority		1,158	38.0	+10.8
Turnout		3,052		
Labour hold		Swing		

==== May 1963 ====
1963
Party	Candidate	Votes	%	±%
Labour	D. Barker*	2,011	66.8	+3.2
Liberal	W. M. Drape	999	33.2	N/A
Majority		1,012	33.6	+6.4
Turnout		3,010		
Labour hold		Swing		

==== May 1964 ====
1964 (2 vacancies)
Party	Candidate	Votes	%	±%
Labour	H. J. Batson*	1,685	70.3	+3.5
Labour	G. Conquest	1,489	62.1	−4.7
Liberal	W. M. Drape	893	37.2	+4.0
Conservative	J. K. McGregor	729	30.4	N/A
Majority		596	24.9	−8.7
Turnout		2,398		
Labour hold		Swing		
Labour hold		Swing		

==== May 1965 ====
1965
Party	Candidate	Votes	%	±%
Labour	G. Conquest*	1,445	58.5	−11.8
Conservative	H. Holland	1,026	41.5	+11.1
Majority		419	17.0	−7.9
Turnout		2,471		
Labour hold		Swing		

==== May 1966 ====
1966
Party	Candidate	Votes	%	±%
Labour	D. Barker*	1,440	63.6	+5.1
Conservative	D. E. Lindsey	824	36.4	−5.1
Majority		616	27.2	+10.2
Turnout		2,264		
Labour hold		Swing		

==== May 1967 ====
1967
Party	Candidate	Votes	%	±%
Conservative	D. E. Lindsey	1,702	54.5	+18.1
Labour	H. J. Batson*	1,422	45.5	−18.1
Majority		280	9.0	
Turnout		3,124		
Conservative gain from Labour		Swing		

==== May 1968 ====
1968
Party	Candidate	Votes	%	±%
Conservative	L. H. Nield	1,764	56.8	+2.3
Labour	G. Conquest*	1,343	43.2	−2.3
Majority		421	13.6	+4.6
Turnout		3,107		
Conservative gain from Labour		Swing		

==== May 1969 ====
1969
Party	Candidate	Votes	%	±%
Conservative	V. R. Cattan	1,757	50.8	−6.0
Labour	D. Barker*	1,700	49.2	+6.0
Majority		57	1.6	−12.0
Turnout		3,457		
Conservative gain from Labour		Swing		

=== Elections in 1970s ===
==== May 1970 ====
1970
Party	Candidate	Votes	%	±%
Labour	D. Barker	2,333	57.5	+8.3
Conservative	D. E. Lindsey*	1,727	42.5	−8.3
Majority		606	15.0	
Turnout		4,060		
Labour gain from Conservative		Swing		

==== May 1971 ====
1971 (3 vacancies; new boundaries)
Party	Candidate	Votes	%	±%
Labour	D. Barker*	2,777	69.8	
Labour	H. Conway*	2,752	69.2	
Labour	K. Franklin	2,536	63.7	
Conservative	V. R. Cattan*	1,777	44.7	
Conservative	D. E. Lindsey	1,030	25.9	
Conservative	J. R. Hill	930	23.4	
Communist	M. Cowle	136	3.4	
Majority		759	19.1	
Turnout		3,979		
Labour win (new seat)				
Labour win (new seat)				
Labour win (new seat)				

==== May 1972 ====
1972
Party	Candidate	Votes	%	±%
Labour	K. Franklin*	2,022	71.8	+2.0
Conservative	L. H. Nield	793	28.2	−16.5
Majority		1,229	43.6	+24.5
Turnout		2,815		
Labour hold		Swing		

==== May 1973 ====
1973 (3 vacancies; reorganisation)
Party	Candidate	Votes	%	±%
Labour	H. Conway*	1,422	55.4	−16.4
Labour	D. Barker*	1,350	52.6	−19.2
Labour	K. Franklin*	1,317	51.3	−20.5
Conservative	E. A. Duffy	760	29.6	+2.9
Conservative	P. T. Heywood	749	29.2	+1.0
Conservative	A. Farmer	734	28.6	+0.4
Residents	D. E. Lindsay	660	25.7	N/A
Majority		557	21.7	−21.9
Turnout		2,566		
Labour hold		Swing		
Labour hold		Swing		
Labour hold		Swing		

==== May 1975 ====
1975
Party	Candidate	Votes	%	±%
Labour	K. Franklin*	1,197	56.1	+6.1
Conservative	T. Brownrigg	935	43.9	+17.1
Majority		262	12.3	+11.0
Turnout		2,132		
Labour hold		Swing	-5.5	

==== May 1976 ====
1976
Party	Candidate	Votes	%	±%
Labour	D. Barker*	1,598	56.8	+0.7
Conservative	D. Heywood	1,217	43.2	−0.7
Majority		381	13.6	+1.4
Turnout		2,815		
Labour hold		Swing	+0.7	

==== May 1978 ====
1978
Party	Candidate	Votes	%	±%
Labour	H. Conway*	1,619	55.4	−1.4
Conservative	D. Heywood	1,174	40.2	−3.0
National Front	N. J. Mead	97	3.3	+3.3
Workers Revolutionary	A. Willams	34	1.2	+1.2
Majority		445	15.2	+1.7
Turnout		2,924	33.8	
Labour hold		Swing	+0.8	

==== May 1979 ====
1979
Party	Candidate	Votes	%	±%
Labour	K. Franklin*	3,662	61.1	+5.7
Conservative	D. Heywood	1,905	31.8	−8.4
Liberal	J. Rhodes	429	7.2	+7.2
Majority		1,757	29.3	+14.1
Turnout		5,996	70.9	+37.1
Labour hold		Swing	+7.0	

=== Elections in 1980s ===
==== May 1980 ====
1980
Party	Candidate	Votes	%	±%
Labour	D. Barker*	2,207	67.9	+6.8
Conservative	D. Heywood	925	28.5	−3.3
Liberal	J. Rhodes	118	3.6	−3.6
Majority		1,282	39.4	+10.1
Turnout		3,250	37.5	−33.4
Labour hold		Swing	+5.0	

==== September 1980 (by-election) ====
By-election: 25 September 1980
Party	Candidate	Votes	%	±%
Labour	Roy Sadler	1,708	67.0	−0.9
Conservative	Doris Heywood	531	20.8	−7.7
Liberal	David Senior	309	12.1	+8.5
Majority		1,177	46.2	+6.8
Turnout		2,548	32.3	−5.2
Labour hold		Swing	+3.4	

==== May 1982 ====
1982 (3 vacancies; new boundaries)
Party	Candidate	Votes	%	±%
Labour	Dennis Barker*	1,880	48.1	
Labour	Kenneth Franklin*	1,766	45.2	
Labour	Valerie Stevens	1,676	42.9	
Conservative	Ronald Beaman	955	24.4	
Liberal	John Redfern	931	23.8	
Liberal	Elsie Hooper	923	23.6	
Liberal	Carole Helme	882	22.6	
Conservative	Peter Dunne	858	22.0	
Conservative	Clive Webb	824	21.1	
National Front	Alfred Coles	70	1.8	
National Front	John Hulse	52	1.3	
National Front	Bryan Nylan	44	1.1	
Majority		721	18.5	
Turnout		3,908	36.2	
Labour win (new seat)				
Labour win (new seat)				
Labour win (new seat)				

==== May 1983 ====
1983
Party	Candidate	Votes	%	±%
Labour	Valerie Stevens*	2,247	52.3	+3.3
Liberal	Dorothy Bell	1,282	29.9	+5.6
Conservative	Peter Dunne	765	17.8	−7.1
Majority		965	22.5	−1.6
Turnout		4,294		
Labour hold		Swing	-1.1	

==== May 1984 ====
1984
Party	Candidate	Votes	%	±%
Labour	N. Litherland	2,522	63.8	+11.5
Liberal	Dorothy Bell	825	20.9	−9.0
Conservative	N. Dentith	609	15.4	−2.4
Majority		1,697	42.9	+20.4
Turnout		3,956		
Labour hold		Swing	+10.2	

==== May 1986 ====
1986
Party	Candidate	Votes	%	±%
Labour	D. Barker*	2,142	57.6	−6.5
Liberal	J. Ashley	1,165	31.3	+10.4
Conservative	T. Grimshaw	410	11.0	−4.4
Majority		977	26.3	−16.6
Turnout		3,717		
Labour hold		Swing	-8.4	

==== May 1987 ====
1987
Party	Candidate	Votes	%	±%
Liberal	James Ashley	2,291	49.1	+17.8
Labour	Bernard Stone	1,814	38.9	−18.7
Conservative	Terence Grimshaw	557	11.9	+0.9
Majority		477	10.2	
Turnout		4,662		
Liberal gain from Labour		Swing	+18.2	

==== August 1987 (by-election) ====
By-election: 20 August 1987
Party	Candidate	Votes	%	±%
Liberal	John Bridges	1,859	53.4	+4.3
Labour	Bernard Stone	1,228	35.3	−3.6
Conservative	Stephen Keegin	350	10.1	−1.8
Green	Paul Reeves	44	1.3	N/A
Majority		631	18.1	+7.9
Turnout		3,481		
Liberal gain from Labour		Swing		

==== May 1988 ====
1988
Party	Candidate	Votes	%	±%
Labour	B. Stone	2,170	48.9	+10.0
SLD	J. Bridges*	1,871	42.2	−6.9
Conservative	T. A. Grimshaw	394	8.9	−3.0
Majority		299	6.7	
Turnout		4,435		
Labour gain from SLD		Swing	+8.4	

=== Elections in 1990s ===
==== May 1990 ====
1990
Party	Candidate	Votes	%	±%
Labour	D. Barker*	2,371	54.1	+5.2
Liberal Democrats	J. Bridges	1,462	33.3	−8.9
Conservative	A. M. Simm	376	8.6	−0.3
Green	D. E. Barnes	177	4.0	+4.0
Majority		909	20.7	+14.0
Turnout		4,386		
Labour hold		Swing	+5.5	

==== May 1991 ====
1991
Party	Candidate	Votes	%	±%
Liberal Democrats	J. Ashley*	2,125	52.7	+19.4
Labour	B. Whitehead	1,606	39.8	−14.3
Conservative	D. Jones	212	5.3	−3.3
Green	T. E. Romagnuolo	88	2.2	−1.8
Majority		519	12.9	
Turnout		4,031	40.9	
Liberal Democrats hold		Swing	+16.8	

==== May 1992 ====
1992
Party	Candidate	Votes	%	±%
Liberal Democrats	S. Ashley	1,559	49.5	−3.2
Labour	B. Stone*	1,331	42.2	+2.4
Conservative	R. Ignatowicz	188	6.0	+0.7
Green	M. Shaw	73	2.3	+0.1
Majority		228	7.2	−5.7
Turnout		3,151		
Liberal Democrats gain from Labour		Swing	-2.8	

==== March 1993 (by-election) ====
By-election: 25 March 1993
Party	Candidate	Votes	%	±%
Liberal Democrats	J. Bridges	2,005	58.1	+8.6
Labour	B. Stone	1,360	39.4	−2.8
Conservative	R. Ignatowicz	86	2.5	−3.5
Majority		645	18.7	+11.5
Turnout		3,451		
Liberal Democrats gain from Labour		Swing		

==== May 1994 ====
1994
Party	Candidate	Votes	%	±%
Liberal Democrats	J. Bridges*	1,918	53.8	+4.3
Labour	B. Whitehead	1,451	40.7	−1.5
Conservative	D. Davenport	132	3.7	−2.3
Green	A. Salter	66	1.9	−0.4
Majority		467	13.1	+5.9
Turnout		3,567		
Liberal Democrats hold		Swing	+1.4	

==== May 1995 ====
1995
Party	Candidate	Votes	%	±%
Liberal Democrats	James Ashley*	1,494	49.7	−4.1
Labour	B. Whitehead	1,393	46.3	+5.6
Conservative	D. Davenport	91	3.0	−0.7
Independent	C. Walsh	31	1.0	+1.0
Majority		101	3.4	−9.7
Turnout		3,009		
Liberal Democrats hold		Swing	-4.8	

==== May 1996 ====
1996
Party	Candidate	Votes	%	±%
Liberal Democrats	Simon Ashley*	1,733	57.3	+7.6
Labour	B. Whitehead	1,167	38.6	−7.7
Conservative	D. Davenport	90	3.0	−0.0
Green	A. Salter	34	1.1	+1.1
Majority		566	18.7	+15.3
Turnout		3,024		
Liberal Democrats hold		Swing	+7.6	

==== May 1998 ====
1998
Party	Candidate	Votes	%	±%
Liberal Democrats	John Bridges*	1,347	60.8	+3.5
Labour	Christopher Lowe	705	31.8	−6.8
Conservative	Ann Hodkinson	75	3.4	+0.4
Green	Emma Hamilton	61	2.8	+1.7
Independent	James Piper	28	1.3	N/A
Majority		642	29.0	+10.3
Turnout		2,216		
Liberal Democrats hold		Swing	+5.1	

==== May 1999 ====
1999
Party	Candidate	Votes	%	±%
Liberal Democrats	James Ashley*	1,368	60.9	+0.1
Labour	Kenneth Strath	805	35.9	+4.1
Conservative	Ann Hodkinson	72	3.2	−0.2
Majority		563	25.1	−3.9
Turnout		2,245	25.0	
Liberal Democrats hold		Swing	-2.0	

=== Elections in 2000s ===
==== May 2000 ====
2000
Party	Candidate	Votes	%	±%
Liberal Democrats	Simon Ashley*	1,178	61.2	+0.3
Labour	Kenneth Strath	625	32.5	−3.4
Conservative	Ann Hodkinson	68	3.5	+0.3
Green	Penelope Collins	54	2.8	+2.8
Majority		553	28.7	+3.6
Turnout		1,925	21.8	−3.2
Liberal Democrats hold		Swing	+1.8	

==== May 2002 ====
2002
Party	Candidate	Votes	%	±%
Liberal Democrats	John Bridges*	1,133	54.3	−6.9
Labour	Martin Rathfelder	781	37.5	+5.0
Green	Penelope Collins	87	4.2	+1.4
Conservative	Rosemary Bishop	84	4.0	+0.5
Majority		352	16.9	−11.8
Turnout		2,085	22.9	+1.1
Liberal Democrats hold		Swing	-5.9	

==== May 2003 ====
2003
Party	Candidate	Votes	%	±%
Liberal Democrats	James Ashley*	1,242	61.2	+6.9
Labour	Martin Rathfelder	630	31.0	−6.5
Green	Penelope Collins	93	4.6	+0.4
Conservative	Rosemary Bishop	65	3.2	−0.8
Majority		612	30.1	+13.2
Turnout		2,030	24.0	+1.1
Liberal Democrats hold		Swing	+6.7	

==== June 2004 ====
2004 (3 vacancies; new boundaries)
Party	Candidate	Votes	%	±%
Liberal Democrats	James Ashley*	1,884	55.0	
Liberal Democrats	Simon Ashley*	1,827	53.3	
Liberal Democrats	John Bridges*	1,768	51.6	
Labour	Peter Cookson	934	27.3	
Labour	Raymond Kelly	934	27.3	
Labour	Martin Rathfelder	824	24.1	
Green	Gareth Pittam	325	9.5	
Conservative	Alice Boden	256	7.5	
Conservative	Rosemary Bishop	231	6.7	
Conservative	Frederich Morris	201	5.9	
Majority		834	24.3	
Turnout		3,426	31.6	
Liberal Democrats win (new seat)				
Liberal Democrats win (new seat)				
Liberal Democrats win (new seat)				

==== May 2006 ====
2006
Party	Candidate	Votes	%	±%
Liberal Democrats	John Richard Bridges*	1,375	47.8	−7.6
Labour	Julie Reid	1,031	35.8	+8.3
Green	David William Mottram	246	8.5	−1.0
Conservative	Raymond Kenyon	226	7.9	+0.4
Majority		344	12.0	−15.9
Turnout		2,878	26.9	−4.6
Liberal Democrats hold		Swing	-7.9	

==== October 2006 (by-election) ====
By-election: 19 October 2006
Party	Candidate	Votes	%	±%
Liberal Democrats	Charles Glover	1,588	49.3	+1.5
Labour	Julie Reid	1,208	37.5	+1.7
BNP	Derek Adams	185	5.7	+5.7
Green	David Mottram	151	4.7	−3.8
Conservative	Daniel Valentine	90	2.8	−5.1
Majority		380	11.8	−0.2
Turnout		3,222	29.9	+3.0
Liberal Democrats hold		Swing	-0.1	

==== May 2007 ====
2007
Party	Candidate	Votes	%	±%
Liberal Democrats	Simon Ashley*	1,600	52.1	+4.3
Labour	Julie Reid	1,150	37.5	+1.7
Green	Barnaby Wolfram	134	4.4	−4.1
Conservative	Lawrie Clapham	130	4.2	−3.7
United Socialist	Sabrina Jones	56	1.8	+1.8
Majority		450	14.7	+2.7
Turnout		3,070	26.9	0
Liberal Democrats hold		Swing	+1.3	

==== May 2008 ====
2008
Party	Candidate	Votes	%	±%
Liberal Democrats	Charles Glover*	1,262	42.8	−9.3
Labour	Julie Reid	1,017	34.5	−3.0
Left List	Sue McPherson	292	9.9	+9.9
Conservative	William Clapham	217	7.4	+3.2
Green	Deborah Clarke	164	5.6	+1.2
Majority		245	8.3	+3.9
Turnout		2,952	25.2	−1.7
Liberal Democrats hold		Swing	-3.1	

=== Elections in 2010s ===
==== May 2010 ====
2010
Party	Candidate	Votes	%	±%
Labour	Julie Reid	2,737	45.9	+11.4
Liberal Democrats	John Bridges*	2,529	42.4	−0.4
Conservative	William Lawrence Clapham	426	7.1	−0.3
Respect	Marie-Angelique Bueler	270	4.5	+4.5
Majority		208	3.5	
Turnout		5,962	49.8	+24.6
Labour gain from Liberal Democrats		Swing	+5.9	

==== May 2011 ====
2011
Party	Candidate	Votes	%	±%
Labour	Peter Cookson	2,162	52.3	+14.8
Liberal Democrats	Simon Ashley*	1,525	36.9	−15.2
Green	Sean Hughes	217	5.2	+0.8
Conservative	Taiwo Tmo	121	2.9	−1.3
Respect	Marie-Angelique Bueler	111	2.7	N/A
Majority		637	15.4	
Turnout		4,136	33.2	
Labour gain from Liberal Democrats		Swing		

==== May 2012 ====
2012
Party	Candidate	Votes	%	±%
Labour	Bernard Stone	2,091	53.8	+19.3
Liberal Democrats	Charles Glover*	1,198	30.8	−12.0
UKIP	Robert Catterall	202	5.2	N/A
Green	Ryan Bestford	161	4.2	−1.4
Respect	Marie-Angelique Bueler	153	3.9	N/A
Conservative	Tmo Opesan	79	2.0	−5.4
Majority		893	23	
Turnout		3,884	30.7	
Labour gain from Liberal Democrats		Swing		

==== May 2014 ====
2014
Party	Candidate	Votes	%	±%
Labour	Julie Reid*	2,548	60.44	
UKIP	Bob Catterall	787	18.67	
Liberal Democrats	Charles Leslie Glover	375	8.89	
Green	Martin Burke	369	8.75	
Conservative	Tmo Opesan	137	3.25	
Majority		1,761	41.8	
Turnout		4,216	31.74	
Labour hold		Swing		

==== May 2015 ====
2015
Party	Candidate	Votes	%	±%
Labour	Peter David Cookson*	4,564	66.2	+13.9
UKIP	Bob Catterall	996	14.0	N/A
Green	Melvyn Newton	527	7.6	+2.4
Conservative	Tmo Opensan	397	5.8	+2.9
Liberal Democrats	Andrew Peter Hickey	328	4.8	−32.1
TUSC	Dick Brown	110	1.6	N/A
Majority		3,598	58.6	
Turnout		6,892	52.6	+19.4
Labour hold		Swing		

==== May 2016 ====
2016
Party	Candidate	Votes	%	±%
Labour	Bernard Eric Stone*	2,792	70.2	+16.4
UKIP	Bob Catterall	481	12.1	+6.9
Liberal Democrats	Sarah Louise Brown	246	6.2	−24.6
Green	Melvyn Newton	239	6.0	+1.8
Conservative	Tmo Opesan	141	3.5	+1.5
Independent	Martin Burke	80	2.0	n/a
Majority		2,311	58.1	
Turnout		3,979	31.28	
Labour hold		Swing		

== See also ==
- Manchester City Council
- Manchester City Council elections
