= James Ashley (politician) =

English politician (1940-2006)

Lord Mayor of Manchester
- In office 17 May 2006 – 12 August 2006
- Preceded by: Mohammed Afzal Khan
- Succeeded by: David Sandiford

Member of Manchester City Council for Gorton South
- In office 7 May 1987 – 12 August 2006
- Preceded by: Valerie Stevens
- Succeeded by: Charles Glover

Personal details
- Born: 21 May 1940 Manchester, England
- Died: 12 August 2006 (aged 66) Manchester, England
- Party: Liberal Democrats (from 1988)
- Other political affiliations: Liberal (before 1988)
- Occupation: Politician

James Ashley (21 May 1940 – 12 August 2006) was a Liberal Democrat politician in the city of Manchester, England. He was the Lord Mayor of Manchester and a councillor in the Gorton South ward.

== Personal life ==
James Ashley was born in Manchester in 1940 and lived in Gorton, one of three sons. He was married in 1963 to Gwen and had three children, Mark, Simon and Gareth. She died in 1984.

He remarried Kate and was stepdad to Judith.

He enjoyed watercolour painting in his spare time.

== Career ==
Ashley was appointed to the Manchester City bench in 1971 and served as a magistrate for 34 years. Ashley was the deputy president for the Manchester South Valuation Tribunal, an independent voluntary lay tribunal that resolves disputes concerning local taxes.

He made political history in 1987, becoming the first SDP–Liberal Alliance councillor to win a seat from Labour on the city council. He served as a Councillor for Gorton South from 1987 to 2006. Ashley was Lord Mayor of Manchester from 17 May 2006, to 12 August 2006. He died in office at age 66.

== Achievements ==
Councillor Ashley was instrumental in the creation of the Gorton Heritage Trail along the Gore Bank Valley conservation area. His voluntary work included Victim Support, Gorton Community Forum, Blackley Civic Society, Charlestown Tenants and Residents Association, and the Management Committee of Sacred Heart Community Hall. Ashley had been a member of the Manchester Chamber of Commerce and Industry's Building Section and was a member of the Northwest Regional Advisory Committee for Building and Civil Engineering.

Honorary titles
Preceded by Afzal Khan	Lord Mayor of Manchester; 17 May 2006 – 12 August 2006	Succeeded by David Sandiford
