= Manchester Gorton by-election =

Manchester Gorton by-election, Gorton by-election, or Gorton and Denton by-election may refer to several by-elections in Gorton, an area of Manchester, England:

- 1889 Gorton by-election
- 1937 Manchester Gorton by-election
- 1942 Manchester Gorton by-election
- 1967 Manchester Gorton by-election
- 2017 Manchester Gorton by-election
- 2026 Gorton and Denton by-election
