= William Oldfield =

William Oldfield may refer to:

- William Allan Oldfield (1874–1928), United States Representative from Arkansas
- William Oldfield (UK politician) (1881–1961), British trade unionist and Labour Member of Parliament
- Bert Oldfield, Australian cricketer
