= Gerald Kaufman =

British politician and author (1930–2017)

The Right Honourable Sir Gerald Kaufman HPk
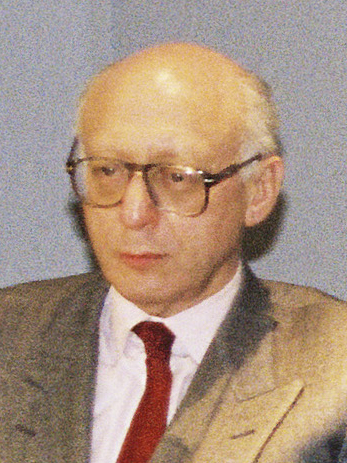
- Kaufman in 1995

Father of the House of Commons
- In office 7 May 2015 – 26 February 2017
- Speaker: John Bercow
- Preceded by: Peter Tapsell
- Succeeded by: Kenneth Clarke

Chair of the Culture, Media and Sport Committee (Note: National Heritage Committee (1992–1997))
- In office 17 April 1992 – 12 July 2005
- Preceded by: Office established
- Succeeded by: John Whittingdale

Minister of State for Industry (Note: Parliamentary Under-Secretary of State (June–December 1975))
- In office 12 June 1975 – 4 May 1979
- Prime Minister: Harold Wilson; James Callaghan
- Preceded by: Michael Meacher
- Succeeded by: Adam Butler

Parliamentary Under-Secretary of State for the Environment
- In office 8 March 1974 – 12 June 1975
- Prime Minister: Harold Wilson
- Preceded by: Michael Heseltine (Note: Office vacant between 7 April 1972 and 8 March 1974.)
- Succeeded by: Ernest Armstrong
Shadow Cabinet posts
Shadow Foreign Secretary
In office 13 July 1987 – 24 July 1992
Leader	Neil Kinnock
Preceded by	Denis Healey
Succeeded by	Jack Cunningham
Shadow Home Secretary
In office 31 October 1983 – 13 July 1987
Leader	Neil Kinnock
Preceded by	Roy Hattersley
Succeeded by	Roy Hattersley
Shadow Secretary of State for the Environment
In office 8 December 1980 – 31 October 1983
Leader	Michael Foot
Preceded by	Roy Hattersley
Succeeded by	Jack Cunningham
Parliamentary offices
Member of Parliament for Manchester Gorton
In office 9 June 1983 – 26 February 2017
Preceded by	Kenneth Marks
Succeeded by	Afzal Khan
Member of Parliament for Manchester Ardwick
In office 18 June 1970 – 13 May 1983
Preceded by	Leslie Lever
Succeeded by	Constituency abolished

Personal details
- Born: Gerald Bernard Kaufman; 21 June 1930 Leeds, England
- Died: 26 February 2017 (aged 86) London, England
- Party: Labour
- Education: Leeds Grammar School; Queen's College, Oxford

Sir Gerald Bernard Kaufman (21 June 1930 – 26 February 2017) was a British politician and author who served as a minister throughout the Labour government of 1974 to 1979. Elected as a member of parliament (MP) at the 1970 general election, he became Father of the House in 2015 and served until his death in 2017.

Born in Leeds to a Polish Jewish family, Kaufman was secretary of the Oxford University Labour Club while studying philosophy, politics and economics at The Queen's College, Oxford. After graduating from Oxford, he worked as a journalist at the Daily Mirror and the New Statesman and as a writer at BBC Television. Again becoming active in the Labour Party, he served as an adviser to Harold Wilson during Wilson's first tenure as Prime Minister before being elected to the House of Commons himself at the 1970 general election to represent Manchester Ardwick.

Kaufman served as a junior minister throughout the 1974–1979 Labour government, holding office successively in the Department of the Environment and the Department of Industry. After the government was defeated at the 1979 general election, he was a member of the Shadow Cabinet in the 1980s. When the Manchester Ardwick constituency was abolished in boundary changes, he successfully contested Manchester Gorton at the 1983 general election. Later in his career he served as an influential backbencher as chair of the Culture, Media and Sport Committee from 1992 to 2005, and was knighted in 2004. Despite being criticised during the 2009 parliamentary expenses scandal, when he was found to have made excess claims to the parliamentary fees office, he continued to serve in the House of Commons and was the UK's eldest sitting MP at the time of his death in February 2017.

Known for his forthright views expressed over his political career, Kaufman was an outspoken opponent of fox hunting, an advocate of Palestinian statehood, and is said to have described his party's 1983 general election manifesto as "the longest suicide note in history". A strong critic of the state of Israel, he called for economic sanctions against the state and denounced the state for committing atrocities (which he phrased as war crimes) against the Palestinian people and their nation.

== Early life and career ==
Kaufman was born in Leeds, the youngest of seven children of Louis and Jane Kaufman. His parents were both Polish Jews who moved to England before the First World War.

After being educated at Leeds Grammar School, Kaufman studied at the University of Oxford (Queen's College), graduating with a degree in philosophy, politics and economics. During his time there he was secretary of the Oxford University Labour Club, where he prevented Rupert Murdoch from standing for office because he broke the society's rule against canvassing.

Kaufman was assistant general secretary of the Fabian Society from 1954 to 1955, a leader writer on the Daily Mirror from 1955 to 1964 and a journalist on the New Statesman from 1964 to 1965. During his time as a journalist, he also worked as a television writer, contributing to BBC Television's satirical comedy programme That Was the Week That Was in 1962 and 1963, where he was most remembered for the "silent men of Westminster" sketch. He appeared as a guest on its successor, Not So Much a Programme, More a Way of Life. Becoming active again in politics, he was Parliamentary Press Liaison Officer for the Labour Party from 1965 to 1970 and eventually became a member of Prime Minister Harold Wilson's informal "kitchen cabinet".

== Parliamentary career ==
=== Ministerial and shadow ministerial career: 1970–1992 ===
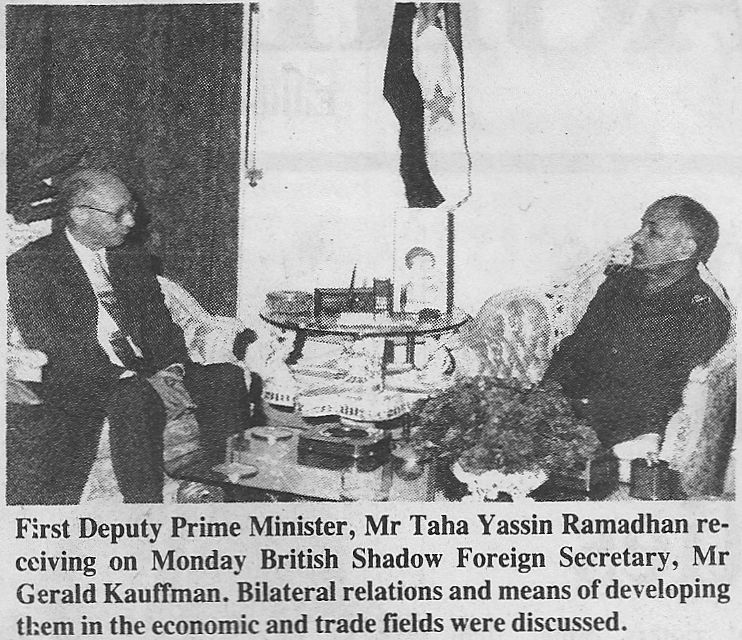
Kaufman as Shadow Foreign Secretary with Taha Yassin Ramadan in Iraq in 1988

At the 1955 general election Kaufman unsuccessfully contested the Conservative-held seat of Bromley (the seat of Foreign Secretary Harold Macmillan), and at the 1959 general election, he contested Gillingham. He was elected MP for Manchester Ardwick at the 1970 general election; he switched constituency to Manchester Gorton at the 1983 election, following the major changes in parliamentary boundaries in that year. He remained MP for Gorton until his death, notwithstanding considerable demographic changes that resulted in Muslim voters becoming an influential segment of the electorate.

Kaufman was a junior minister throughout Labour's time in power from 1974 to 1979, initially as Parliamentary under-secretary of state at the Department of the Environment from 1974 to 1975 under Anthony Crosland. Kaufman supported the UK leaving the European Communities in the 1975 referendum, after which he was made Parliamentary Under-Secretary of State at the Department of Industry under Eric Varley. Kaufman worried that his support for leaving the EC in the referendum had led to a demotion by Harold Wilson. However, he was quickly promoted to Minister of State at the department in December 1975. Kaufman served in the role until the Labour government was defeated at the 1979 general election; during his time in office, he represented the UK in talks with the United States over allowing Concorde to land on US soil, and steered through legislation nationalising the aircraft and shipbuilding industries. Kaufman was made a member of the Privy Council in 1978.

In opposition, Kaufman served in the Shadow Cabinet as Shadow Environment Secretary from 1980 to 1983, Shadow Home Secretary from 1983 to 1987 and Shadow Foreign Secretary from 1987 to 1992. He dubbed the Labour Party's left-wing 1983 general election manifesto "the longest suicide note in history".

=== Early backbench career: 1992–2005 ===
In 1992, Kaufman went to the backbenches and became chair of the National Heritage Select Committee and chaired the committee (later the Culture, Media and Sport Committee) from 1992 to 2005. He was also a member of the Parliamentary Committee of the Parliamentary Labour Party from 1980 to 1992, the Labour Party National Executive Committee from 1991 to 1992, and the Royal commission on House of Lords Reform in 1999. In 1997, he criticised the then chief executive of the Royal Opera House Mary Allen over alleged financial misconduct, which ultimately contributed to her tendering her resignation.

Kaufman very rarely voted against the Labour Party whip and therefore voted with the government on the 2003 invasion of Iraq, saying in Parliament "Even though all our hearts are heavy, I have no doubt that it is right to vote with the Government tonight".

Kaufman was appointed a Knight Bachelor in the 2004 Birthday Honours for services to Parliament.

Kaufman was honoured with the Hilal-e-Pakistan by the Government of Pakistan.

An outspoken opponent of hunting with hounds, Kaufman was assaulted in 2004 by a group of pro-fox hunting campaigners and said that he was subjected to antisemitic taunts. These he said he found ironic as he had recently been accused of being a self-hating Jew by a member of the Board of Deputies of British Jews.

=== Parliamentary expenses scandal and later career: 2005–2017 ===
Kaufman was implicated in the 2009 expenses scandal, where a number of British MPs made excessive expense claims, misusing their permitted allowances and expense accounts. He was found to have submitted expense claims that included £8,865 for a 40-inch LCD television, £1,851 for an antique rug imported from New York, and £225 for a rollerball pen. He blamed his self-diagnosed obsessive compulsive disorder for his claims, and also said that his condition led him to purchase a pair of Waterford Crystal grapefruit bowls on his parliamentary expenses. Between 2005 and 2007, he claimed £28,834 for home improvements. He was subsequently summoned to the Parliamentary Fees Office to explain these claims, and in the end was reimbursed £15,329. He was also challenged over regular claims for "odd jobs", which he submitted without receipts at a rate of £245 per month, then £5 below the limit for unreceipted expenses, to which he replied by asking why those expenses were being queried.

On 25 May 2010, during the Queen's Speech debate, Kaufman accused the Liberal Democrat candidate for his constituency during the 2010 general election, Qassim Afzal, of running "an anti-Semitic, and personally anti-Semitic, election campaign" in Manchester Gorton.

Kaufman voted against the Labour whip for the first time on the provision in the Police Reform and Social Responsibility Act 2011 to introduce an extra requirement in the process for private prosecutors seeking to obtain an arrest warrant for "universal jurisdiction" offences such as war crimes, torture and crimes against humanity.

In the run-up to the 2012 United States presidential election, Kaufman challenged the assertion that "American voters ... know a phoney when they see one", since "If they did, Barack Obama would not be president".

Following his re-election to the Commons in 2015, just before his 85th birthday, Kaufman became Father of the House following the retirement of Peter Tapsell. On 20 July 2015, he broke the Labour whip for a second time, one of 48 Labour MPs to vote against the second reading of the government's 2015 Welfare Reform and Work Bill which included £12 billion in welfare cuts, a vote in which Labour MPs had been ordered to abstain.

== Criticism of Israel ==
It is time to remind Sharon that the Star of David belongs to all Jews, not to his repulsive Government. His actions are staining the star of David with blood. The Jewish people, whose gifts to civilised discourse include Einstein and Epstein, Mendelssohn and Mahler, Sergei Eisenstein and Billy Wilder, are now symbolised throughout the world by the blustering bully Ariel Sharon, a war criminal implicated in the murder of Palestinians at the Sabra and Shatila camps and now involved in killing Palestinians once again.

— Kaufman in a speech given to the House of Commons, during Israel's military operation codenamed Defensive Shield in April 2002

Kaufman was infatuated with Israel in his youth, and was a member of Poale Zion (later the Jewish Labour Movement). He became disillusioned with Israel because of its treatment of the Palestinian territories. In 1988, on the 40th anniversary of the State of Israel, while Shadow Foreign Secretary, Kaufman appeared on the television discussion programme After Dark. A representative of the Palestine Liberation Organization in London was also on the panel and The Daily Telegraph considered that Kaufman risked a backlash from British Jews by appearing with a supporter of Yasser Arafat.

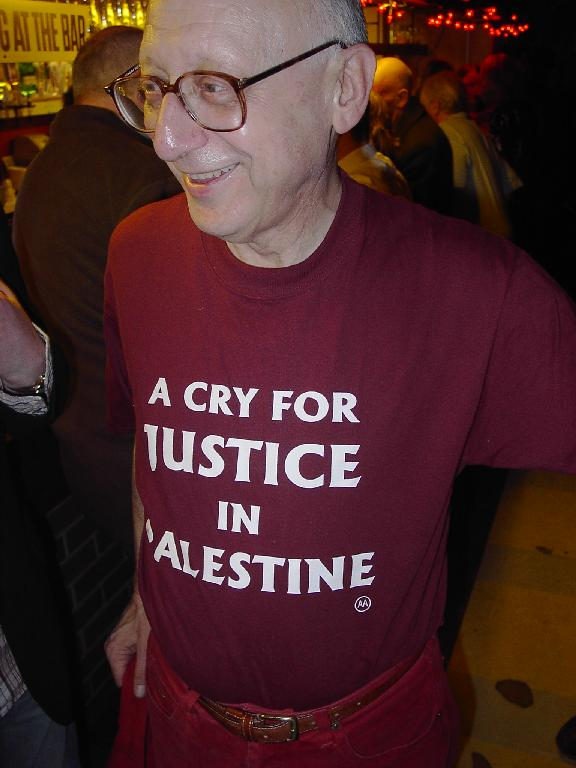
Kaufman wears a "cry for justice in Palestine" shirt in 2003

Having once publicly vowed never again to visit Israel, Kaufman retracted that promise in 2002 in order to film a BBC television documentary, The End of the Affair, in which he recounted his disillusionment with the state. He believed by that time that Israel had been reduced to an "international pariah" by its prime minister Ariel Sharon, whom he described as "a war criminal". He wrote an article in July 2004 for The Guardian titled "The case for sanctions against Israel: What worked with apartheid can bring peace to the Middle East", in which he proposed economic sanctions against Israel. In 2006, he called for the Israeli soldiers responsible for the deaths of British citizens Tom Hurndall and James Miller to be handed over and tried in Britain or before an international war crimes tribunal and stated that economic sanctions would have to be considered if Israel refused to cooperate.

During the Gaza War in January 2009, Kaufman gave a speech to the Commons in which he stated: "The present Israeli government ruthlessly and cynically exploits the continuing guilt from Gentiles over the slaughter of Jews in the Holocaust as justification for their murder of Palestinians". About the death of his grandmother in the Holocaust, he said: "My grandmother did not die to provide cover for Israeli soldiers murdering Palestinian grandmothers in Gaza". After the Israeli army's spokeswoman replied to the deaths of 800 Palestinians that "500 of them were militants", he called her statement the "reply of a Nazi" and remarked that members of the Jewish resistance during the Holocaust also "could have been dismissed as militants". While considering Hamas a "deeply nasty organisation", he described their boycott by the UK government as having "dreadful consequences" and reminded the Commons that Israel had been created following acts of terrorism by the Irgun. He urged the British government to implement a total ban on arms sales to Israel'.'

In June 2009, Kaufman compared Israel's treatment of the Palestinians in Gaza and the West Bank to South Africa under apartheid and Iran. He described Iran as a "loathsome regime" but said that, unlike Israel, "at least it keeps its totalitarian theocracy to within its own borders" and that the proximity of affluent Israeli settlers to impoverished Palestinians was more "heart-rending" than conditions in South Africa during apartheid as the Bantustans were "some distance away from the affluent areas". He also said that Israel should follow the lead of the British Armed Forces in their conduct in Northern Ireland during the Troubles.

Kaufman was the leader of a large European parliamentary delegation to Gaza in January 2010 during which he described the Israeli blockade of Gaza as "evil" and said Israeli officials who authorised the use of white phosphorus munitions in densely populated Gaza should be tried for war crimes. In March 2010, along with another Labour MP Martin Linton, Kaufman accused the Conservative Party of being "too close" to Israel, saying that those parts of the party not controlled by Lord Ashcroft were being controlled by "right-wing Jewish millionaires". Following the Gaza flotilla raid in June 2010, which resulted in the killing of nine activists, he called Israel's actions "a war crime of piracy in international waters, kidnapping and murder, all in pursuit of upholding an illegal blockade on Gaza that amounts to collective punishment".

In December 2010, Kaufman criticised a proposed amendment to Britain's universal jurisdiction law seeking to prevent visiting Israeli officials from being arrested and indicted, claiming that such changes made a mockery of the British legal system. He highlighted the arrest warrant against former Israeli Foreign Minister Tzipi Livni for her part in the "slaughter" that took place during the Gaza War. He also claimed that British Jews were waking up to Israel's human rights violations and distancing themselves from Israel. As he stressed Israel's alleged war crimes and breaches of international law, he was berated for his statements by pro-Israel MPs and the deputy speaker had to restore order. Conservative MP Robert Halfon accused Kaufman of using the bill reading for his own political agenda and claimed Kaufman's "hatred for Israel knows no bounds".

On 30 March 2011, Kaufman was caught by a microphone in the Chamber of the House of Commons saying "here we are, the Jews again", when fellow Jewish Labour MP Louise Ellman rose to speak, for which he apologised. Ellman had stood up to intervene in a debate on the Police Reform and Social Responsibility Bill, but she and Kaufman, although both Jewish, had large differences in their views on the Israeli–Palestinian conflict.

Kaufman supported the 2011 Palestinian bid for United Nations recognition and membership of a Palestinian state along the 1967 borders with east Jerusalem as its capital, writing in The Guardian: "This brave Palestinian move will change the entire environment of the Middle East and tell the Israelis they must negotiate meaningfully if they wish to be one of the states in a two-state solution." Following the 2011 Nakba Day riots when a number of Palestinian refugees were killed by Israeli security forces as they attempted to breach Israel's borders as part of protests demanding the implementation of the Palestinian right of return, Kaufman gave a speech criticising Israeli actions, claiming that Palestinians were "slaughtered" and said "the way in which Israeli soldiers maltreat Palestinians is appalling".

At a Palestine Return Centre event in Parliament on 27 October 2015, Kaufman alleged that "Jewish money, Jewish donations to the Conservative Party – as in the general election in May – support from The Jewish Chronicle, all of those things, bias the Conservatives". He accused Israel of staging recent Palestinian knife attacks as an excuse to kill Palestinians. John Mann, the Labour chair of the All-Party Parliamentary Group Against Antisemitism, denounced Kaufman's comments as "the incoherent ramblings of an ill-informed demagogue". Jeremy Corbyn, Leader of the Labour Party, released a statement saying Kaufman's remarks were "completely unacceptable and deeply regrettable", further saying: "Such remarks are damaging to community relations, and also do nothing to benefit the Palestinian cause. I have always implacably opposed all forms of racism, antisemitism and Islamophobia."

== Literary career ==
Kaufman wrote many books and articles. Some are political: How to be a Minister (1980) is an irreverent look at the difficulties faced by ministers trying to control the civil service. Kaufman had the book proofread by both Harold Wilson and James Callaghan prior to publication. Some are cultural: Meet Me in St Louis is a study of the 1944 Judy Garland film. He contributed a chapter about John Hodge, the Labour MP for Manchester Gorton elected in 1906, to Men Who Made Labour, edited by Alan Haworth and Diane Hayter. He also acted as chairman of the Booker Prize judges in 1999.

== Death ==
On 26 February 2017, Kaufman died at his residence in St John's Wood, following a long illness; he was 86. He was the first Father of the House to die in office since T. P. O'Connor in 1929. Former Prime Minister Tony Blair praised Kaufman's work and said they had been close friends since Blair was first elected to the House of Commons in 1983. An inter-faith memorial service was held on 7 March 2017 in Gorton Monastery, a historic local landmark whose restoration Kaufman had supported.

== Publications ==
- The Daily Mirror Spotlight on Trade Unions, by Sydney Jacobson & William Connor, Research by Gerald Kaufman, Daily Mirror Newspapers, 1950
- Fabian Journal No 16 July 1955 (with Margaret Cole), Fabian Society, 1955
- The Left: A symposium (Editor) Blond, 1966
- To Build the Promised Land, Weidenfeld & Nicolson, 1973 ISBN 0297765094
- How to be a Minister, Sidgwick & Jackson Ltd, 1980 ISBN 0571190804
- Renewal: Labour's Britain in the 1980s, Penguin, 1983 ISBN 0140523510
- My Life in the Silver Screen, Faber & Faber, 1985 ISBN 0571134939
- Inside the Promised Land: Personal View of Today's Israel, Ashgate 1986 ISBN 0704530740
- Meet Me in St. Louis, British Film Institute, 1994 ISBN 0851705014
- Gulliver & Beyond (contributor), Channel 4 Television, 1996 ISBN 1851441603

== Notes ==
Parliament of the United Kingdom
Preceded by Leslie Lever	Member of Parliament for Manchester Ardwick; 1970–1983	Constituency abolished
Preceded by Kenneth Marks	Member of Parliament for Manchester Gorton; 1983–2017	Succeeded by Afzal Khan
Political offices
Preceded by Roy Hattersley	Shadow Secretary of State for Environment; 1980–1983	Succeeded by Jack Cunningham
Preceded by Roy Hattersley	Shadow Home Secretary; 1983–1987	Succeeded by Roy Hattersley
Preceded by Denis Healey	Shadow Foreign Secretary; 1987–1992	Succeeded by Jack Cunningham
Honorary titles
Preceded by Sir Peter Tapsell	Father of the House of Commons; 2015–2017	Succeeded by Kenneth Clarke
Preceded by Sir Peter Tapsell	Oldest sitting Member of Parliament; 2015–2017	Succeeded by Dennis Skinner
