= 2017 Manchester Gorton by-election =

UK parliamentary by-election

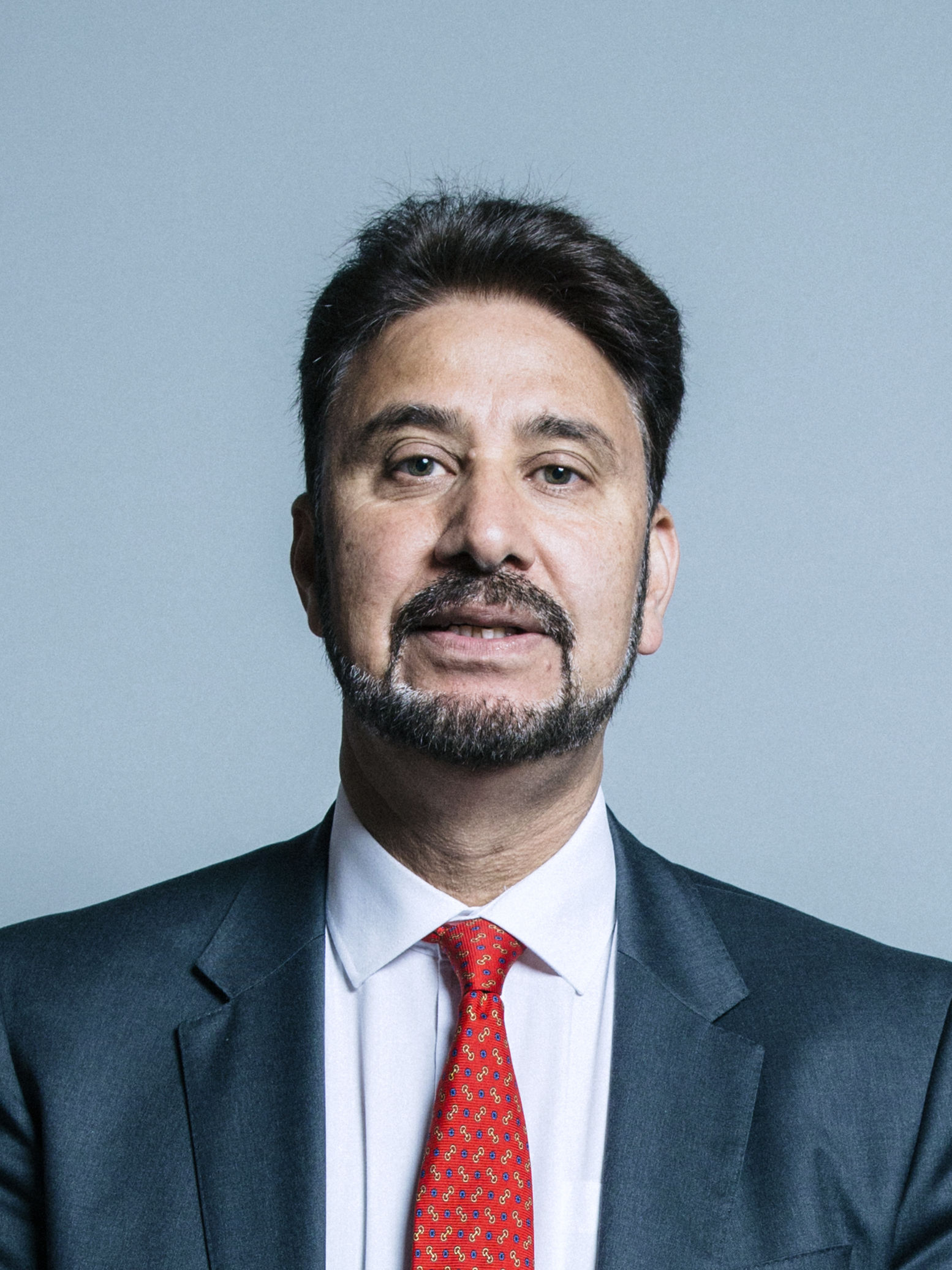
Afzal Khan was elected as the next MP for Manchester Gorton.

A by-election for the House of Commons constituency of Manchester Gorton was scheduled to take place on 4 May 2017, following the death of the sitting Labour Member of Parliament (MP), Sir Gerald Kaufman. It was cancelled on 20 April following the announcement of the 2017 general election. At the general election in June, most of the candidates who were due to stand in the by-election contested the seat, and the Labour candidate, Afzal Khan, retained the seat for his party with a large majority.

Kaufman had represented the seat since 1983, and was the Father of the House of Commons (the longest-serving MP). At the previous general election in 2015, he had won a large majority with over two-thirds of the vote, and Manchester Gorton was considered a safe seat. When selecting their candidate, the Labour Party announced a shortlist of five, all of whom had a South Asian background (the seat was over 25% Asian), and chose Afzal Khan, a Member of the European Parliament (MEP) for North West England. Ten other candidates were confirmed to stand in the by-election, including George Galloway, a former Labour MP who stood as an independent, as well as candidates from the Conservative Party, Liberal Democrats, Green Party and UKIP.

On 18 April, Theresa May, the prime minister, called an early election for June 2017, meaning that Parliament would have been dissolved before the by-election took place. Because of this, the by-election was cancelled, making it the first by-election to be cancelled since 1924. With the exception of two minor candidates, the candidates who were supposed to take part in the by-election stood in the general election instead. Khan won the seat with a large majority, receiving 76% of the vote, followed by the Conservative candidate in second. This was one of the highest vote shares achieved by the Labour Party in the election. Khan retained the seat at the 2019 general election with a slightly reduced majority.

== Background ==
Location of Manchester Gorton within Greater Manchester

Location of Greater Manchester within England

The UK Parliament constituency of Manchester Gorton is located in Greater Manchester in North West England. The constituency is a borough constituency, which means that it is mostly urban; it consists of the wards of Fallowfield, Gorton North, Gorton South, Levenshulme, Longsight, Rusholme and Whalley Range in the city of Manchester. In 2016, 68 per cent of adults in the constituency aged 16 to 64 were economically active, which was lower than both the regional and national averages. The constituency's population at the time of the 2011 census was 29% Asian, mainly of Pakistani origin; later, the 2021 census found that the consistuency was 41% white, 36% Asian (including 25% Pakistani and 5% Bangladeshi) and 12% Black, while England and Wales as a whole were 82% white and 9% Asian.

Like all UK Parliament constituencies, it elects one member of parliament (MP) to the House of Commons using the first-past-the-post voting system. Gorton has, with various boundary alterations, been held by the Labour Party since the 1935 general election, and by Gerald Kaufman from 1983 until his death (he previously held the constituency of Manchester Ardwick from 1970 to 1983). At the previous general election in 2015, Kaufman was re-elected with a large majority of over 24,000 votes, making the constituency a safe seat for the party. The Green Party came second, followed by the Conservative Party, UKIP and the Liberal Democrats, whilst the Liberal Democrats had finished second in every general election before that since 1997. In 2017, Labour held every Manchester City Council seat in the constituency.

In the 2016 United Kingdom European Union membership referendum, Manchester voted 60% in favour of remaining in the European Union (EU); the country voted in favour of leaving the EU (known as Brexit). As Gorton was only part of the Manchester counting area, the exact result in the constituency is unknown, but through demographic modelling the Remain share in the constituency has been estimated to be 62% by Chris Hanretty of the University of East Anglia, and 61% by Number Cruncher Politics.

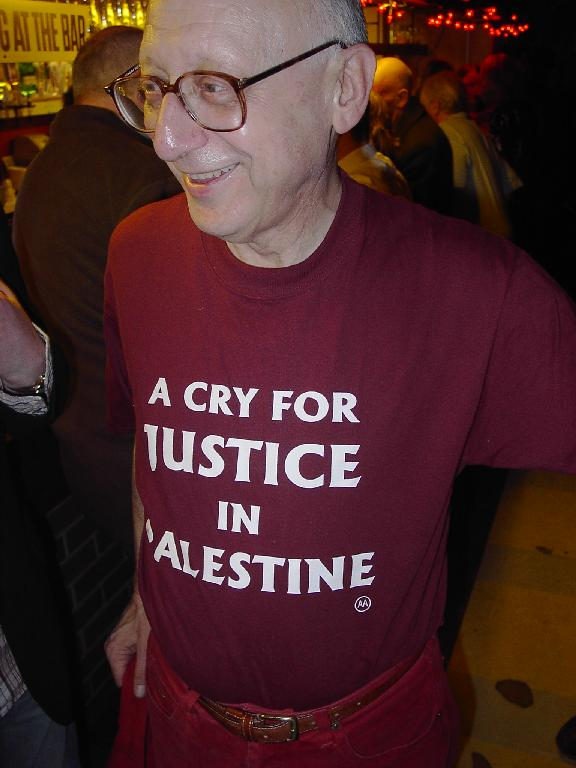
Sir Gerald Kaufman, who held the seat from 1983 until his death.

General election 2015: Manchester Gorton
Party	Candidate	Votes	%	±%
Labour	Gerald Kaufman	28,187	67.1	+17.0
Green	Laura Bannister	4,108	9.8	+7.1
Conservative	Mohammed Afzal	4,063	9.7	−1.3
UKIP	Phil Eckersley	3,434	8.2	New
Liberal Democrats	Dave Page	1,782	4.2	−28.4
TUSC	Simon Hickman	264	0.6	−0.3
Pirate	Cris Chesha	181	0.4	−0.2
Majority		24,079	57.3	+39.8
Turnout		42,019	57.6	+7.1
Labour hold		Swing	+5.0	

On 26 February 2017, Kaufman died after a long illness, triggering a by-election in his constituency. Kaufman was the Father of the House of Commons (the longest-serving MP), having been in office for 47 years, and many politicians paid tribute to him, including the former Labour prime minister Gordon Brown, who described him as "a brilliant speaker, a compelling writer, an acerbic wit and a conscientious constituency MP".

== Candidates ==
=== Labour ===
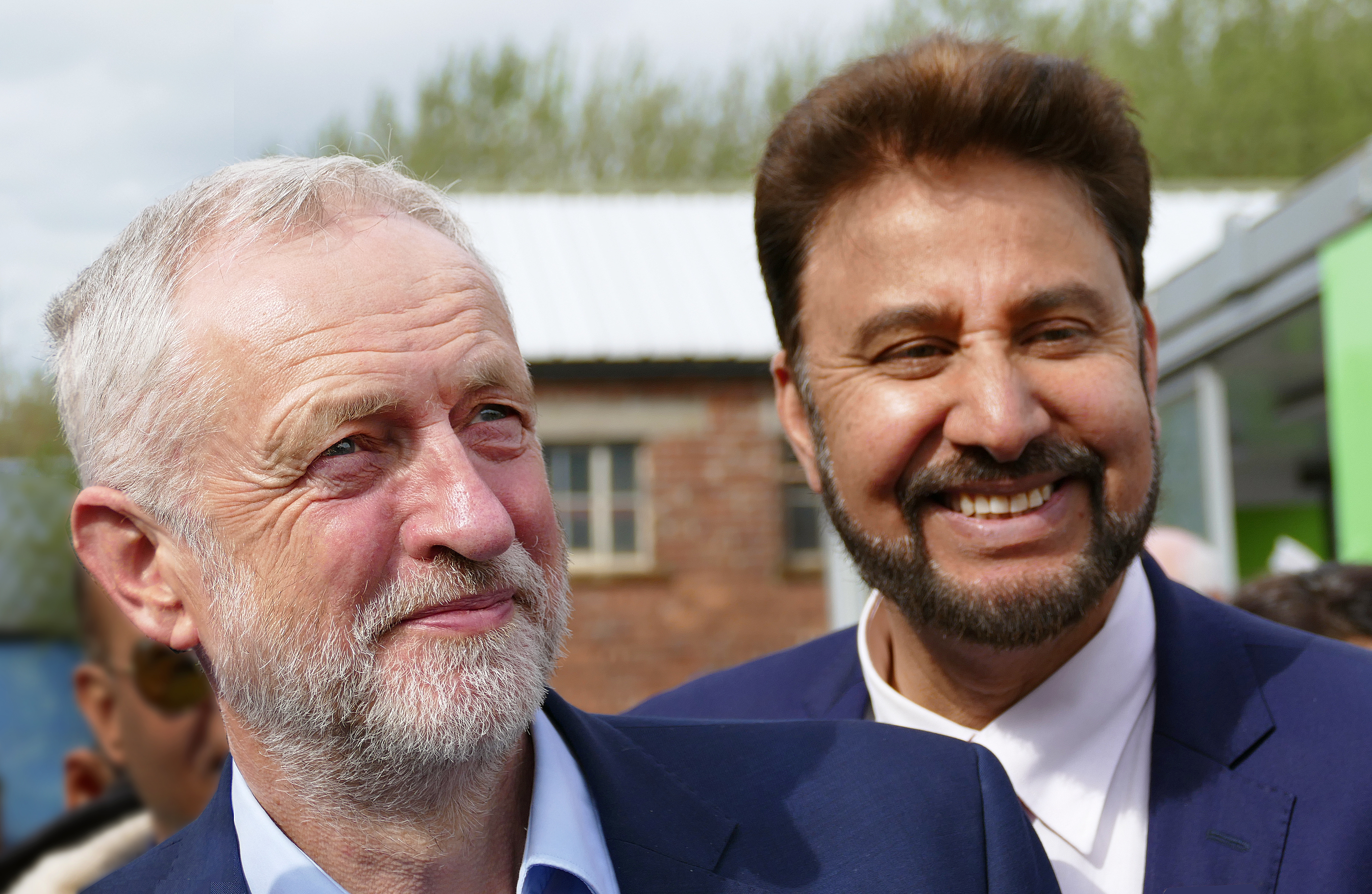
Labour leader Jeremy Corbyn campaigning with Labour candidate Afzal Khan.

The local Constituency Labour Party (CLP) had been under special measures since 2004, so candidate selection was run by the National Executive Committee. The Manchester Evening News reported that a debate had been taking place for many years within the Gorton CLP over who would succeed Kaufman, and that the party was experiencing severe internal conflict as a result, with many local figures considering putting themselves forward. A selection panel of Keith Vaz, Glenis Willmott, Shabana Mahmood, Andi Fox and Claudia Webbe interviewed potential candidates on 20 March. Vaz, Willmott and Mahmood were seen as representing the "moderate" wing of the party, and allies of party leader Jeremy Corbyn described the inclusion of Vaz on the panel instead of Corbyn's preferred choice of Rebecca Long-Bailey as an "ambush" arranged by the party's deputy leader, Tom Watson. The Labour longlist consisted of eight local councillors, the Member of the European Parliament (MEP) Afzal Khan, and Sam Wheeler.

The NEC panel shortlisted five candidates, four of whom were local councillors on the Manchester City Council:

- Nasrin Ali, a solicitor and councillor for Levenshulme;
- Yasmine Dar, a social worker and councillor for Moston;
- Afzal Khan, MEP for North West England, former councillor, and former Lord Mayor of Manchester;
- Amina Lone, a councillor for Hulme who contested Morecambe and Lunesdale for Labour in the 2015 general election;
- Luthfur Rahman, the chair of the CLP and councillor for Longsight.

The shortlist consisted only of candidates with a South Asian background, which was praised seeing as the city had no ethnic minority MPs; previously, there had been speculation that there would be an all-women shortlist, but this did not take place. The omission of two candidates seen as close to Corbyn, Sam Wheeler and Julie Reid, drew complaints from the left wing of the party. Khan was reported to have the support of the Unite, Usdaw, GMB and CWU trade unions, while Dar was backed by the local branch of the Corbyn-supporting organisation Momentum; Unite initially backed Wheeler.

Khan was selected as Labour's candidate on 22 March 2017. It was reported that Dar came second, with Rahman in third place. The other two candidates were eliminated in the first round of voting, under the Labour Party's alternative vote system.

=== Other parties ===
The Green Party of England and Wales announced the entrepreneur Jess Mayo as their candidate on 16 March; she was a member of the Trafford Green Party branch who had stood for election in Wythenshawe and Sale East at the 2015 general election. Dr Shaden Jaradat, an employee of the University of Manchester, was selected as the Conservative Party candidate on 30 March. UKIP chose Phil Eckersley, who was also the party's candidate for Manchester Gorton at the 2015 general election, to stand in the by-election. On 4 March, the Liberal Democrats announced their candidate as Jackie Pearcey, a former councillor for the ward of Gorton North, who stood in the constituency in general elections in 1997 and 2001. After early speculation, John Leech, a councillor who had served as the Liberal Democrat MP for Manchester Withington from 2005 to 2015, had ruled himself out.

George Galloway, a former Labour Party and Respect Party MP, announced his intention to stand as an independent candidate on 21 March; he had previously represented several British constituencies and admitted that he had no link to Manchester, saying "It’s true I’m not local, but then neither was Matt Busby". Galloway was critical of Labour's shortlist only including people of South Asian ethnicity. Upon Galloway's announcement, both the Liberal Democrats and Greens attacked him for his strong support for Brexit, while Lisa Nandy of the Labour Party criticised his past comments about sexual assault allegations against Julian Assange. The Communist League announced that Peter Clifford would be their candidate at the by-election. Clifford had been a candidate in the 2017 Greater Manchester mayoral election before withdrawing due to cost, and previously contested the 2012 by-election in the neighbouring constituency of Manchester Central, coming last out of 12 candidates with 64 votes. Kemi Abidogun was to contest the seat for the Christian Peoples Alliance. "The Irrelevant" Johnny Disco was standing for the satirical Monster Raving Loony Party. Two other independent candidates, David Hopkins and Sufi Khandoker, would also have been on the ballot.

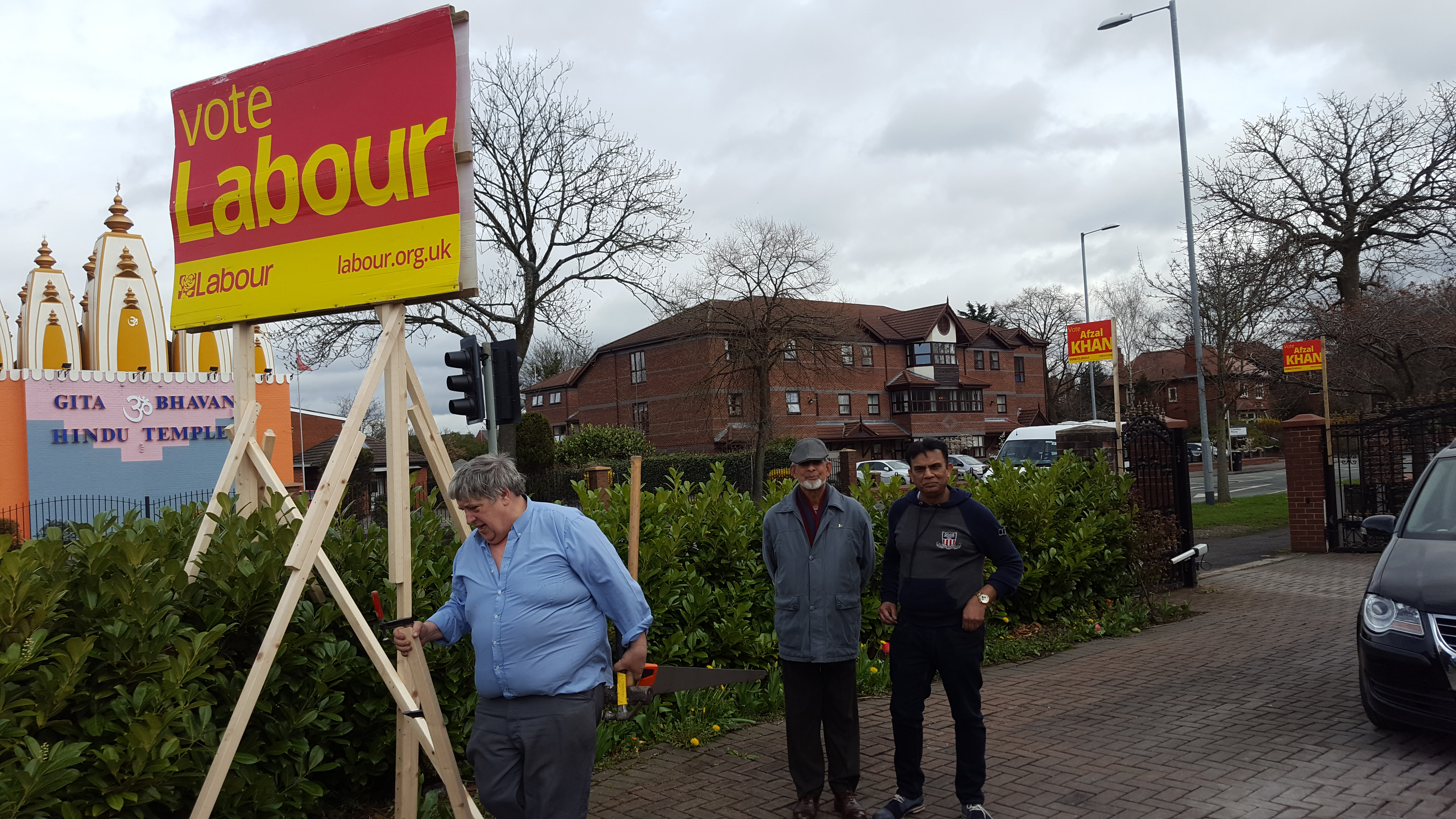
Labour Party poster campaign

The full list of eleven candidates was published on 6 April 2017.

Candidate	Party
Kemi Abidogun	CPA
Peter Clifford	Communist League
The Irrelevant Johnny Disco	Monster Raving Loony
Phil Eckersley	UKIP
George Galloway	Independent
David Hopkins	Independent
Shaden Jaradat	Conservative
Afzal Khan	Labour
Sufi Khandoker	Independent
Jess Mayo	Green
Jackie Pearcey	Liberal Democrats

The candidates at the general election were the same, except for Sufi Khandoker and The Irrelevant Johnny Disco, who did not stand.

== Campaign ==
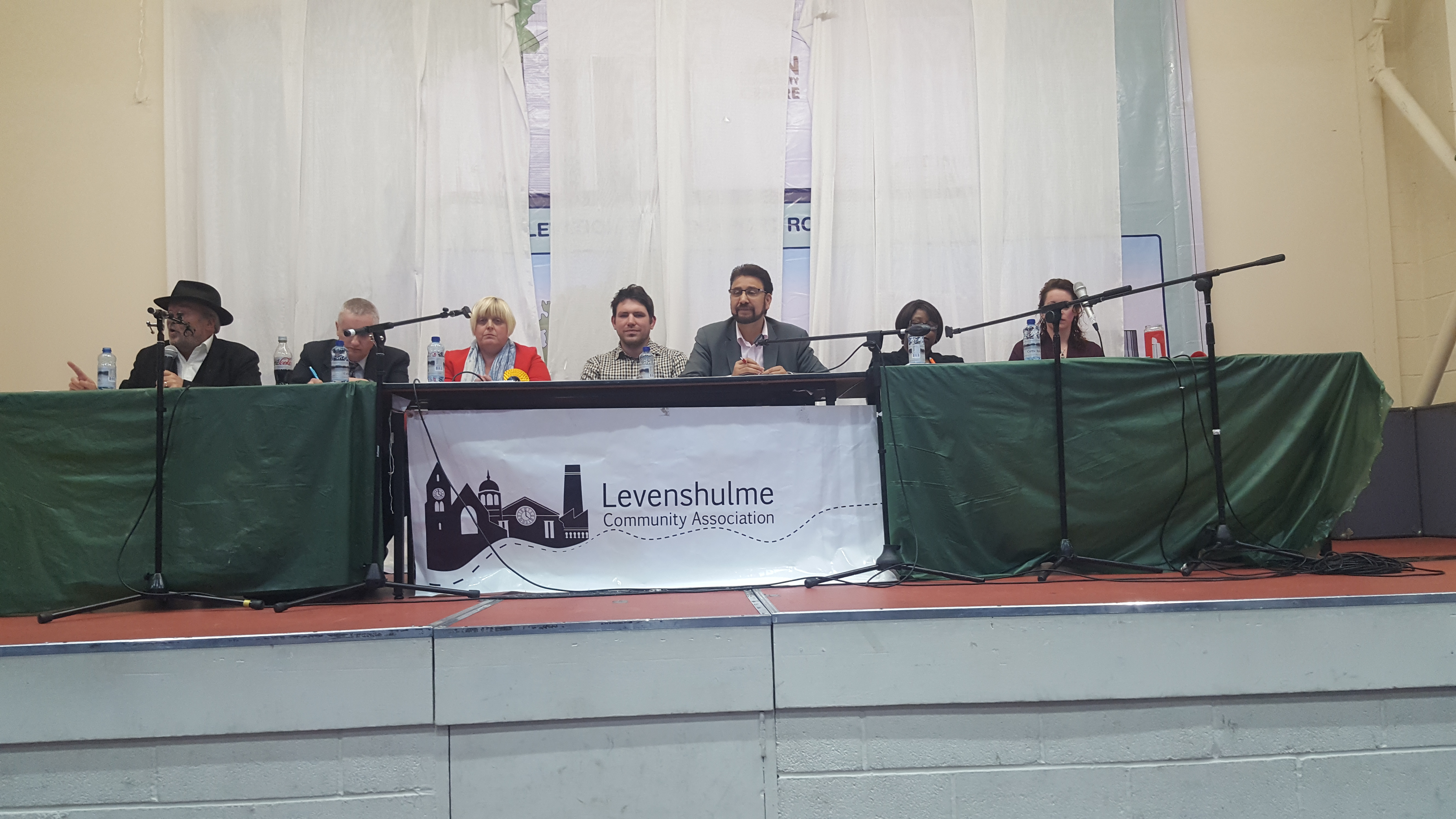
Levenshulme Community Association hustings

The Liberal Democrat Deputy Director of Campaigns and Elections, Dave McCobb, claimed on 15 April that private polling suggested that the Liberal Democrats had returned to 31% support in the constituency versus Labour's 51%, similar to the results of the 2010 general election in the constituency, in which the Liberal Democrats received 33% of the vote and Labour polled 50%. Tim Farron, the leader of the Liberal Democrats, later told The Observer that he believed that Jackie Pearcey, the Liberal Democrat candidate, would have won the seat from Labour had the poll gone ahead; Farron affirmed that he still expected her to take the seat in the 2017 general election. In the event, Pearcey finished in fourth place.

A hustings arranged by the Levenshulme Community Association on 22 April went ahead despite the postponement of the vote, and was attended by eight of the candidates.

== Cancellation ==
On 18 April, Theresa May, the Conservative prime minister, announced a plan to seek an early parliamentary general election on 8 June, meaning that Parliament would be dissolved at the time the by-election was scheduled to take place. David Lidington, the Leader of the House of Commons told MPs that there was no statutory power to cancel a by-election when a general election was in progress, but that there was a precedent from 1923 when a by-election writ was regarded as having been superseded. His expectation was that the Acting Returning Officer would regard that as being the case. There was doubt as to whether the by-election would or would not go ahead, however, with the Acting Returning Officer saying that she had no legal power to cancel the poll. MPs were then asked to overturn the writ for the poll, cancelling the by-election, which they did on 20 April, leaving the seat vacant until the general election.

== Results and analysis ==
General election 2017: Manchester Gorton
Party	Candidate	Votes	%	±%
Labour	Afzal Khan	35,085	76.3	+9.3
Conservative	Shaden Jaradat	3,355	7.3	−2.4
Independent	George Galloway	2,615	5.7	New
Liberal Democrats	Jackie Pearcey	2,597	5.7	+1.4
Green	Jess Mayo	1,038	2.3	−7.5
UKIP	Phil Eckersley	952	2.1	−6.1
CPA	Kemi Abidogun	233	0.5	New
Independent	David Hopkins	51	0.1	New
Communist League	Peter Clifford	27	0.1	New
Majority		31,730	69.0	+11.7
Turnout		45,953	61.0	+3.4
Labour hold		Swing	+5.9	

At the general election on 8 June, Afzal Khan won with a majority of 31,730 to become the new constituency MP. At the election, the constituency was the 9th-safest seat (in terms of majority as a percentage), with every safer seat also being held by Labour; the seat also had the lowest vote share for the Conservatives of any seat outside Northern Ireland. George Galloway's 5.7% was the 10th highest vote share achieved by an independent candidate in the election.

== Aftermath ==
Khan was re-elected at the next general election on 12 December 2019, increasing his vote share to 78% of the vote, though his absolute majority over the Conservative candidate in second place decreased slightly. The constituency had the 7th-highest vote share for Labour in the election and was the party's 6th-safest seat.

== See also ==
- 2026 Abbotsford-Mission provincial by-election, by-election in Canada cancelled for the 2026 British Columbia general election
