= Manchester Gorton =

Parliamentary constituency in the United Kingdom, 1885–2024

- Former borough constituency for the House of Commons
- Boundary of Manchester Gorton in Greater Manchester in 2010.

- Location of Greater Manchester within England.
- County: Greater Manchester
- Electorate: 74,681 (December 2010)
- Major settlements: Belle Vue, Gorton, Levenshulme, Rusholme, Longsight

1918–2024
- Seats: One
- Created from: South East Lancashire
- Replaced by: Manchester Rusholme, Gorton and Denton

South East Lancashire Gorton
- Former county constituency for the House of Commons

1885–1918
- Seats: one
- Created from: South East Lancashire

Manchester Gorton was a constituency (Note: A borough constituency (for the purposes of election expenses and type of returning officer)) represented in the House of Commons of the UK Parliament. It was the safest Labour seat in Greater Manchester by numerical majority and one of the safest in the country.

Manchester Gorton was abolished for the 2024 general election. It was split into the new constituencies of Manchester Rusholme and Gorton and Denton.

== Constituency profile ==
The seat covered Gorton, Fallowfield, Levenshulme, Longsight, Rusholme and Whalley Range to the south and east of the city centre, which are diverse and liberal suburbs, with some levels of deprivation such as in Longsight. Most housing is made of red brick terraced houses. There is a large student population, particularly in Fallowfield which includes several halls of residence and private rented houses serving students of Manchester's large universities, though the universities’ campuses are in Manchester Central. The seat includes the Curry Mile of takeaways and restaurants, Gorton Monastery, and small urban parks such as Debdale Park and Platt Fields Park.

The seat was ethnically diverse and its residents were less wealthy than the UK average.

== History ==
The Redistribution of Seats Act 1885 divided the existing seat of South East Lancashire into eight single-member constituencies. The Gorton Division (of Lancashire) was one of these seats. It was renamed the Gorton Division of Manchester in 1918: the area had been incorporated as part of the County Borough of Manchester in 1890.

Manchester Gorton has returned MPs from the Labour Party since 1935, with majorities exceeding 17% since 1979. The 2015 general election result made the seat the eighth-safest of Labour's 232 seats by percentage of majority.

From 1983 to 2017, Sir Gerald Kaufman, Father of the House of Commons, represented the constituency. His death in February 2017 triggered a by-election which was due to be held on 4 May 2017, but this was subsequently countermanded (that is, cancelled) after the House of Commons voted for a snap general election to be held on 8 June 2017. (Note: As with all constituencies, the constituency elects one Member of Parliament (MP) by the first past the post system of election at least every five years.) At that election, the Conservatives returned their lowest vote share for any seat in Great Britain, at 7.3%. The newly-elected MP, Afzal Khan became an opposition frontbencher. In 2019, he was re-elected with a commanding lead over the Conservatives, their vote share still in single digits. Khan remained on the frontbench until November 2023.

== Boundaries ==
Map of boundaries 2010–2024

Manchester Gorton in Lancashire, boundaries used 1974–1983

1885–1918: The Gorton Division of the parliamentary county of South East Lancashire was defined as consisting of the parishes of Denton, Haughton, and Openshaw, and the parish of Gorton (except for the detached part in the parliamentary borough of Manchester).

The constituency comprised an area bounded on the west by the city of Manchester and to the east and south by the county boundary with Cheshire.

In 1890, Manchester's municipal boundaries were extended to include Gorton and Openshaw, although constituency boundaries remained unchanged until 1918. Prior to 1918 the constituency consisted of four wards: Gorton North, Gorton South, Openshaw and St. Mark's.

1918–1950: The Gorton division of the parliamentary borough of Manchester was defined as consisting of the Gorton North, Gorton South and Openshaw wards of the county borough of Manchester.

The Representation of the People Act 1918 reorganised parliamentary seats throughout Great Britain. The redistribution reflected the boundary changes of 1890, with Gorton becoming a division of the parliamentary borough of Manchester. Denton and Haughton, which together had formed Denton Urban District in 1894, were transferred to the Mossley Division of Lancashire.

1950–1955: The borough constituency of Manchester, Gorton was defined as consisting of the Gorton North, Gorton South, Levenshulme and Openshaw wards of the county borough of Manchester.

The next redrawing of English constituencies was effected by the Representation of the People Act 1948. The Act introduced the term "borough constituency". Levenshulme was transferred from the abolished Manchester Rusholme seat. The revised boundaries were first used at the 1950 general election.

1955–1974: The Gorton North and Gorton South wards of the county borough of Manchester, and the urban districts of Audenshaw and Denton.

In 1955 boundary changes were made based on the recommendations of the Boundary Commission appointed under the House of Commons (Redistribution of Seats) Act 1949. Levenshulme passed to Manchester Withington while Openshaw formed the core of a new Manchester Openshaw seat.

1974–1983: The Gorton North and Gorton South wards of the county borough of Manchester, and the urban districts of Audenshaw and Denton.

The Boundary Commission for England proposed no change to the constituency at the Second Periodic Review of Westminster constituencies, but later went on to propose a minor amendment to the constituency to meet new ward boundaries in Manchester.

1983–2010: The Fallowfield, Gorton North, Gorton South, Levenshulme, Longsight and Rusholme wards of the City of Manchester.

The 1983 redistribution of seats reflected local government reforms made in 1974. Manchester Gorton became a borough constituency in the parliamentary county of Greater Manchester. The constituency was unaltered at the next redistribution prior to the 1997 general election.

2010–2024: The Fallowfield, Gorton North, Gorton South, Levenshulme, Longsight, Rusholme and Whalley Range wards of the City of Manchester.

In 2018 the Local Government Boundary Commission for England (LGBCE) implemented changes to Manchester's electoral wards including the merging of Gorton North and Gorton South to create a new ward, Gorton and Abbey Hey. For the purposes of parliamentary elections the 2004–2018 ward boundaries are used.

== Abolition ==
Further to the completion of the 2023 review of Westminster constituencies, the seat was abolished prior to the 2024 general election, with its contents split in two:

- Gorton, Levenshulme and Longsight to be included with the town of Denton in a new constituency called Gorton and Denton
- Fallowfield, Rusholme and Whalley Range to form part of the re-established constituency of Manchester Rusholme

== Members of Parliament ==
Year	Member	Party	Notes
1885	Richard Peacock	Liberal	
1889 by-election	William Mather	Liberal	
1895	Ernest Hatch	Conservative	
1905	Ernest Hatch	Liberal	Hatch crossed the floor
1906	John Hodge	Labour	
1923	Joseph Compton	Labour	
1931	Eric Bailey	Conservative	
1935	Joseph Compton	Labour	
1937 by-election	William Wedgwood Benn	Labour	
1942 by-election	William Oldfield	Labour	
1955	Konni Zilliacus	Labour	
1967 by-election	Kenneth Marks	Labour	
1983	Sir Gerald Kaufman	Labour	Died February 2017; by-election was called, but countermanded due to snap general election.
2017	Afzal Khan	Labour	Shadow Deputy House of Commons Leader, 2020–2021

== Elections ==
=== Elections in the 2010s ===
General election 2019: Manchester Gorton
Party	Candidate	Votes	%	±%
Labour	Afzal Khan	34,583	77.6	+1.3
Conservative	Sebastian Lowe	4,244	9.5	+2.2
Liberal Democrats	Jackie Pearcey	2,448	5.5	−0.2
Green	Eliza Tyrrell	1,697	3.8	+1.5
Brexit Party	Lesley Kaya	1,573	3.5	New
Majority		30,339	68.1	−0.9
Turnout		44,545	58.5	−2.5
Labour hold		Swing	−0.5	

General election 2017: Manchester Gorton
Party	Candidate	Votes	%	±%
Labour	Afzal Khan	35,085	76.3	+9.2
Conservative	Shaden Jaradat	3,355	7.3	−2.4
Independent	George Galloway	2,615	5.7	New
Liberal Democrats	Jackie Pearcey	2,597	5.7	+1.5
Green	Jess Mayo	1,038	2.3	−7.5
UKIP	Phil Eckersley	952	2.1	−6.1
CPA	Kemi Abidogun	233	0.5	New
Independent	David Hopkins	51	0.1	New
Communist League	Peter Clifford	27	0.1	New
Majority		31,730	69.0	+11.7
Turnout		45,953	61.0	+3.4
Labour hold		Swing	+5.9	

These are the same as the candidates who were to stand at the cancelled 2017 by-election, except for an Official Monster Raving Loony Party candidate and another independent, who did not stand at the general election.

General election 2015: Manchester Gorton
Party	Candidate	Votes	%	±%
Labour	Gerald Kaufman	28,187	67.1	+17.0
Green	Laura Bannister	4,108	9.8	+7.1
Conservative	Mohammed Afzal	4,063	9.7	−1.3
UKIP	Phil Eckersley	3,434	8.2	New
Liberal Democrats	Dave Page	1,782	4.2	−28.4
TUSC	Simon Hickman	264	0.6	−0.3
Pirate	Cris Chesha	181	0.4	−0.2
Majority		24,079	57.3	+39.8
Turnout		42,019	57.6	+7.1
Labour hold		Swing	+5.0	

General election 2010: Manchester Gorton
Party	Candidate	Votes	%	±%
Labour	Gerald Kaufman	19,211	50.1	−3.0
Liberal Democrats	Qassim Afzal	12,508	32.6	−0.9
Conservative	Caroline Healy	4,224	11.0	+1.2
Green	Justine Hall	1,048	2.7	New
Respect	Mohammed Zulfikar	507	1.3	New
TUSC	Karen Reissman	337	0.9	New
Christian	Peter Harrison	254	0.7	New
Pirate	Tim Dobson	236	0.6	New
Majority		6,703	17.5	−2.1
Turnout		38,325	50.5	+4.7
Labour hold		Swing	−1.1	

=== Elections in the 2000s ===
General election 2005: Manchester Gorton
Party	Candidate	Votes	%	±%
Labour	Gerald Kaufman	15,480	53.2	−9.6
Liberal Democrats	Qassim Afzal	9,672	33.2	+11.9
Conservative	Amanda Byrne	2,848	9.8	−0.1
UKIP	Gregg Beaman	783	2.7	+1.0
Workers Revolutionary	Dan Waller	181	0.6	New
Resolutionist Party	Matthew Kay	159	0.5	New
Majority		5,808	20.0	−21.5
Turnout		29,123	45.0	+2.3
Labour hold		Swing	−10.8	

General election 2001: Manchester Gorton
Party	Candidate	Votes	%	±%
Labour	Gerald Kaufman	17,099	62.8	−2.5
Liberal Democrats	Jackie Pearcey	5,795	21.3	+3.8
Conservative	Christopher Causer	2,705	9.9	−1.8
Green	Bruce Bingham	835	3.1	+2.2
UKIP	Rashid Bhatti	462	1.7	New
Socialist Labour	Kirsty Muir	333	1.2	−0.2
Majority		11,304	41.5	−6.3
Turnout		27,229	42.7	−12.9
Labour hold		Swing	−3.2	

=== Elections in the 1990s ===
Changes in vote compared with notional figures for 1992 election following boundary changes.

General election 1997: Manchester Gorton
Party	Candidate	Votes	%	±%
Labour	Gerald Kaufman	23,704	65.3	+2.9
Liberal Democrats	Jackie Pearcey	6,362	17.5	+3.5
Conservative	Guy Senior	4,249	11.7	−7.8
Referendum	Kevin Hartley	812	2.2	New
Green	Spencer FitzGibbon	683	1.9	+0.3
Socialist Labour	Trevor Wongsam	501	1.4	New
Majority		17,342	47.8	+5.0
Turnout		36,311	55.6	−5.2
Labour hold		Swing		

General election 1992: Manchester, Gorton
Party	Candidate	Votes	%	±%
Labour	Gerald Kaufman	23,671	62.3	+7.9
Conservative	Jonathan Bullock	7,392	19.5	−3.8
Liberal Democrats	Phil Harris	5,327	14.0	−7.7
Liberal	Terry Henderson	767	2.0	New
Green	Mike Daw	595	1.6	New
Revolutionary Communist	Pam Lawrence	108	0.3	New
Natural Law	Philip D. Mitchell	84	0.2	New
International Communist	Colleen E. Smith	30	0.1	New
Majority		16,279	42.8	+11.7
Turnout		37,974	60.8	−9.6
Labour hold		Swing	+5.9	

=== Elections in the 1980s ===
General election 1987: Manchester Gorton
Party	Candidate	Votes	%	±%
Labour	Gerald Kaufman	24,615	54.4	+3.2
Conservative	John Kershaw	10,550	23.3	−5.2
Liberal	Keith Whitmore	9,830	21.7	+2.7
Red Front	Pam Lawrence	253	0.6	New
Majority		14,065	31.1	+8.4
Turnout		45,248	70.4	+2.5
Labour hold		Swing		

General election 1983: Manchester Gorton
Party	Candidate	Votes	%	±%
Labour	Gerald Kaufman	22,460	51.2	
Conservative	John Kershaw	12,495	28.5	
Liberal	Keith Whitmore	8,348	19.0	
Communist	Malcolm Cowle	333	0.8	
BNP	Leslie Andrews	231	0.5	
Majority		9,965	22.7	
Turnout		43,867	67.9	
Labour hold		Swing		

Gerald Kaufman had been the MP for the Manchester Ardwick constituency, which had been abolished for this election, since 1970.

=== Elections in the 1970s ===
General election 1979: Manchester Gorton
Party	Candidate	Votes	%	±%
Labour	Kenneth Marks	22,293	53.5	
Conservative	Michael Lord	16,009	38.5	
Liberal	Graham Shaw	2,867	6.9	
National Front	Richard Chadfield	469	1.1	New
Majority		6,284	15.1	
Turnout		41,638	77.2	
Labour hold		Swing		

General election October 1974: Manchester Gorton
Party	Candidate	Votes	%	±%
Labour	Kenneth Marks	21,287	53.63	
Conservative	Stephen Waley-Cohen	12,423	31.30	
Liberal	A. Cottam	5,984	15.08	
Majority		8,864	22.33	
Turnout		39,694	70.94	
Labour hold		Swing		

General election February 1974: Manchester Gorton
Party	Candidate	Votes	%	±%
Labour	Kenneth Marks	22,276	51.23	
Conservative	Stephen Waley-Cohen	13,300	30.59	
Liberal	Robert Brooks	7,906	18.18	
Majority		8,976	20.64	
Turnout		43,482	78.35	
Labour hold		Swing		

General election 1970: Manchester, Gorton
Party	Candidate	Votes	%	±%
Labour	Kenneth Marks	23,679	53.47	
Conservative	John A. Kevill	17,594	39.73	
Liberal	James M. Ashley	3,013	6.80	
Majority		6,085	13.74	
Turnout		44,376	71.90	
Labour hold		Swing		

=== Elections in the 1960s ===
1967 Manchester Gorton by-election
Party	Candidate	Votes	%	±%
Labour	Kenneth Marks	19,259	45.89	−14.21
Conservative	Winston Churchill	18,682	44.51	+4.61
Liberal	Terry Lacey	2,471	5.89	New
All Party Alliance	John Creasey	1,123	2.68	New
Communist	Victor Eddisford	437	1.04	New
Majority		557	1.38	
Turnout		41,972		
Labour hold		Swing		

General election 1966: Manchester, Gorton
Party	Candidate	Votes	%	±%
Labour	Konni Zilliacus	24,726	60.10	
Conservative	Ian Keith Paley	16,418	39.90	
Majority		8,308	20.20	
Turnout		41,144	72.56	
Labour hold		Swing		

General election 1964: Manchester, Gorton
Party	Candidate	Votes	%	±%
Labour	Konni Zilliacus	23,895	55.11	
Conservative	Edwin Hodson	19,465	44.89	
Majority		4,430	10.22	
Turnout		43,360	76.44	
Labour hold		Swing		

=== Elections in the 1950s ===
General election 1959: Manchester, Gorton
Party	Candidate	Votes	%	±%
Labour	Konni Zilliacus	23,337	50.94	
Conservative	Henry Donald Moore	22,480	49.06	
Majority		857	1.88	
Turnout		45,817	82.04	
Labour hold		Swing		

General election 1955: Manchester, Gorton
Party	Candidate	Votes	%	±%
Labour	Konni Zilliacus	21,102	50.32	
Conservative	K. Bruce Campbell	20,833	49.68	
Majority		269	0.64	
Turnout		41,935	76.49	
Labour hold		Swing		

General election 1951: Manchester, Gorton
Party	Candidate	Votes	%	±%
Labour	William Oldfield	28,763	58.02	
Conservative	Squire Horace Garlick	20,815	41.98	
Majority		7,948	16.04	
Turnout		49,578	82.31	
Labour hold		Swing		

General election 1950: Manchester, Gorton
Party	Candidate	Votes	%	±%
Labour	William Oldfield	28,088	55.18	
Conservative	James Watts	18,564	36.47	
Liberal	Abram Maxwell Caplin	3,377	6.63	New
Communist	Syd Abbott	873	1.72	New
Majority		9,524	18.71	
Turnout		50,902	85.49	
Labour hold		Swing		

=== Elections in the 1940s ===
General election 1945: Manchester, Gorton
Party	Candidate	Votes	%	±%
Labour	William Oldfield	24,095	69.05	
Conservative	Harry Sharp	10,799	30.95	
Majority		13,296	38.10	
Turnout		34,894	75.53	
Labour hold				

1942 Manchester Gorton by-election
Party	Candidate	Votes	%	±%
Labour	William Oldfield	Unopposed		
Labour hold				

=== Elections in the 1930s ===
1937 Manchester Gorton by-election
Party	Candidate	Votes	%	±%
Labour	William Wedgwood Benn	17,849	57.69	+1.83
Conservative	Alexander Spearman	13,091	42.31	−1.83
Majority		4,758	15.38	
Turnout		30,940		
Labour hold		Swing		

General election 1935: Manchester, Gorton
Party	Candidate	Votes	%	±%
Labour	Joseph Compton	20,039	55.86	
Conservative	Eric Bailey	15,833	44.14	
Majority		4,206	11.72	N/A
Turnout		35,872	77.12	
Labour gain from Conservative		Swing		

General election 1931: Manchester, Gorton
Party	Candidate	Votes	%	±%
Conservative	Eric Bailey	21,228	55.1	+25.6
Labour	Joseph Compton	16,316	42.3	−18.8
Communist	Chris Flanagan	1,000	2.6	New
Majority		4,912	12.8	N/A
Turnout		38,544	81.9	+0.4
Conservative gain from Labour		Swing		

=== Elections in the 1920s ===
General election 1929: Manchester Gorton
Party	Candidate	Votes	%	±%
Labour	Joseph Compton	22,056	61.1	+5.1
Unionist	Alfred Critchley	10,664	29.5	−14.5
Liberal	Beatrice Annie Bayfield	3,385	9.4	New
Majority		11,392	31.6	+19.6
Turnout		36,105	81.5	+1.0
Registered electors		44,300		
Labour hold		Swing	+9.8	

General election 1924: Manchester Gorton
Party	Candidate	Votes	%	±%
Labour	Joseph Compton	16,383	56.0	−4.0
Unionist	B.C. Sellars	12,898	44.0	+4.0
Majority		3,485	12.0	−8.0
Turnout		29,281	80.5	+6.0
Registered electors		36,378		
Labour hold		Swing	−4.0	

General election 1923: Manchester Gorton
Party	Candidate	Votes	%	±%
Labour	Joseph Compton	16,080	60.0	+6.4
Unionist	William Heap	10,702	40.0	−6.4
Majority		5,378	20.0	+12.8
Turnout		26,782	74.5	−4.5
Registered electors		35,963		
Labour hold		Swing	+4.0	

General election 1922: Manchester Gorton
Party	Candidate	Votes	%	±%
Labour	John Hodge	15,058	53.6	−13.8
Unionist	William Heap	13,057	46.4	New
Majority		2,001	7.2	−38.3
Turnout		28,115	79.0	+21.0
Registered electors		35,567		
Labour hold		Swing	N/A	

=== Election in 1918 ===
General election 1918: Manchester Gorton
Party	Candidate	Votes	%	±%
Labour	John Hodge	13,047	67.4	+15.2
Ind. Unionist	Henry White	5,005	25.9	New
Socialist Labour	J. T. Murphy	1,300	6.7	New
Majority		8,042	41.5	+37.1
Turnout		19,352	58.0	−24.7
Registered electors		33,382		
Labour hold		Swing	N/A	

- Although Hodge was a member of the Coalition Government, no official Coalition Government endorsement was sent to any candidate

== Election results for South-East Lancashire, Gorton Division ==
=== Elections in the 1910s ===
Expected General Election 1914–15: Under the terms of the Parliament Act 1911 a General Election was required to take place before the end of 1915. The political parties had been making preparations for an election to take place and by July 1914, the following candidates had been selected;

- Labour: John Hodge
- Unionist: Fred H Carter

In the event, the election was postponed on the outbreak of the Great War.

General election December 1910: Gorton
Party	Candidate	Votes	%	±%
Labour	John Hodge	7,840	52.2	+0.6
Conservative	Henry White	7,187	47.8	−0.6
Majority		653	4.4	+1.2
Turnout		15,027	82.7	−0.6
Registered electors		18,175		
Labour hold		Swing	+0.6	

General election January 1910: Gorton
Party	Candidate	Votes	%	±%
Labour	John Hodge	7,807	51.6	−14.8
Conservative	Henry White	7,334	48.4	+14.8
Majority		473	3.2	−29.6
Turnout		15,141	83.3	+5.3
Registered electors		18,175		
Labour hold		Swing	−14.8	

=== Elections in the 1900s ===
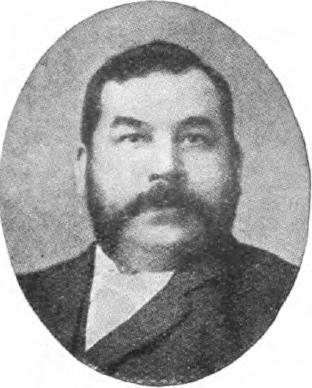
Hodge

General election 1906: Gorton
Party	Candidate	Votes	%	±%
Labour Repr. Cmte.	John Hodge	8,566	66.4	+18.8
Conservative	SW Royce	4,341	33.6	−18.8
Majority		4,225	32.8	
Turnout		12,907	78.0	+2.2
Registered electors		16,547		
Labour Repr. Cmte. gain from Conservative		Swing	+18.8	

Hatch crossed the floor of the House of Commons to sit with the Liberals, around February 1905.

Ward

General election 1900: Gorton
Party	Candidate	Votes	%	±%
Conservative	Ernest Hatch	5,761	52.4	−5.5
Lib-Lab	William Ward	5,241	47.6	New
Majority		520	4.8	−11.0
Turnout		11,002	75.8	−2.3
Registered electors		14,511		
Conservative hold		Swing		

=== Elections in the 1890s ===
Hatch

General election 1895: Gorton
Party	Candidate	Votes	%	±%
Conservative	Ernest Hatch	5,865	57.9	+9.0
Ind. Labour Party	Richard Pankhurst	4,261	42.1	New
Majority		1,604	15.8	
Turnout		10,126	78.1	−9.2
Registered electors		14,511		
Conservative gain from Liberal		Swing		

General election 1892: Gorton
Party	Candidate	Votes	%	±%
Liberal	William Mather	5,255	51.1	−1.5
Conservative	Ernest Hatch	5,033	48.9	+1.5
Majority		222	2.2	−3.0
Turnout		10,288	87.3	+2.9
Registered electors		11,782		
Liberal hold		Swing	−1.5	

=== Elections in the 1880s ===
Mather

By-election, 22 Mar 1889: Gorton
Party	Candidate	Votes	%	±%
Liberal	William Mather	5,155	54.5	+1.9
Conservative	Ernest Hatch	4,309	45.5	−1.9
Majority		846	9.0	+3.8
Turnout		9,464	88.7	+4.3
Registered electors		10,674		
Liberal hold		Swing	+1.9	

- Caused by Peacock's death.

General election 1886: Gorton
Party	Candidate	Votes	%	±%
Liberal	Richard Peacock	4,592	52.6	−8.0
Conservative	Arthur George Egerton	4,135	47.4	+8.0
Majority		457	5.2	−16.0
Turnout		8,727	84.4	−0.3
Registered electors		10,334		
Liberal hold		Swing	−8.0	

General election 1885: Gorton
Party	Candidate	Votes	%	±%
Liberal	Richard Peacock	5,300	60.6	N/A
Conservative	Daniel Irvine Flattely	3,452	39.4	N/A
Majority		1,848	21.2	N/A
Turnout		8,752	84.7	N/A
Registered electors		10,334		
Liberal win (new seat)				

== See also ==
- Parliamentary constituencies in Greater Manchester

== Notes ==
Parliament of the United Kingdom
Preceded by Louth and Horncastle	Constituency represented by the father of the House; 2015–2017	Succeeded by Rushcliffe
