= William Wedgwood Benn, 1st Viscount Stansgate =

British politician (1877–1960)

Air Commodore The Right Honourable The Viscount Stansgate DSO DFC PC
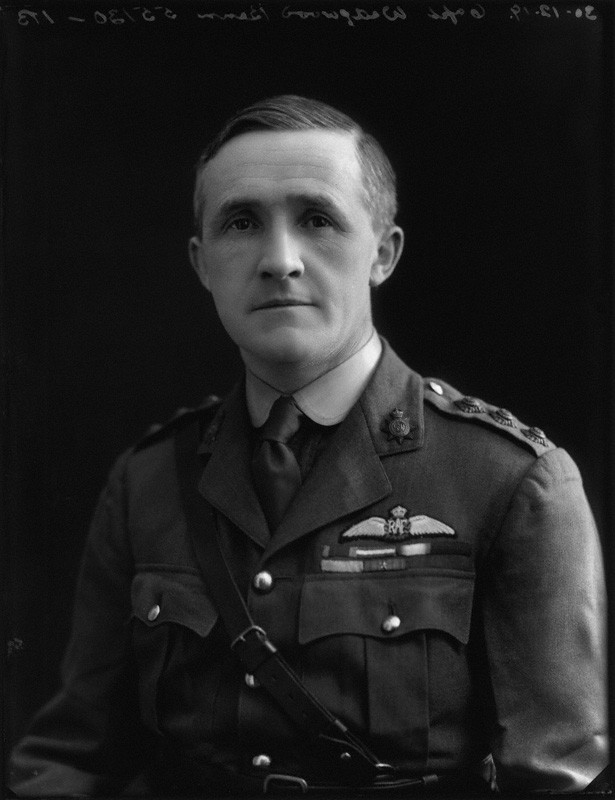

Secretary of State for India
- In office 7 June 1929 – 24 August 1931
- Monarch: George V
- Prime Minister: Ramsay MacDonald
- Preceded by: The Viscount Peel
- Succeeded by: Sir Samuel Hoare, Bt

Secretary of State for Air
- In office 3 August 1945 – 4 October 1946
- Monarch: George VI
- Prime Minister: Clement Attlee
- Preceded by: Harold Macmillan
- Succeeded by: Philip Noel-Baker
Parliamentary offices
Member of the House of Lords
Lord Temporal
Hereditary peerage 20 January 1942 – 17 November 1960
Succeeded by	Anthony Wedgwood Benn
Member of Parliament for Manchester Gorton
In office 18 February 1937 – 20 January 1942
Preceded by	Joseph Compton
Succeeded by	William Oldfield
Member of Parliament for Aberdeen North
In office 16 August 1928 – 7 October 1931
Preceded by	Frank Rose
Succeeded by	John George Burnett
Member of Parliament for Leith
In office 14 December 1918 – 15 February 1927
Preceded by	Constituency established
Succeeded by	Ernest Brown
Member of Parliament for St George
In office 8 February 1906 – 25 November 1918
Preceded by	Thomas Dewar
Succeeded by	Constituency abolished

Personal details
- Born: 10 May 1877 Hackney, London, England
- Died: 17 November 1960 (aged 83) Westminster, London, England
- Party: Liberal (until 1927); Labour (from 1927)
- Spouse: Margaret Holmes (m. 1920)
- Children: 4, including Tony Benn
- Parent(s): Sir John Benn, 1st Baronet; Elizabeth Pickstone
- Education: University College, London
- Awards: DSO (1917); DFC (1918); Bronze Medal of Military Valor (Italy; 1918)
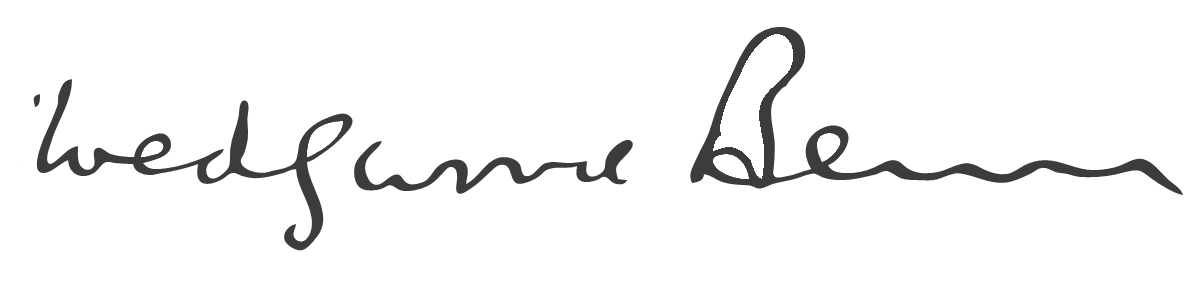
- Signature

Military service
- Allegiance: United Kingdom
- Branch/service: Royal Navy; British Army; Royal Air Force
- Years of service: 1914–1918, 1940–1945
- Rank: Air Commodore
- Battles/wars: First World War; Second World War: Battle of Gallipoli

William Wedgwood Benn, 1st Viscount Stansgate, DSO, DFC, PC (10 May 1877 – 17 November 1960) was a British Liberal politician who later joined the Labour Party. A decorated Royal Air Force officer, he was Secretary of State for India between 1929 and 1931 and Secretary of State for Air between 1945 and 1946. He was the father of Tony Benn and the paternal grandfather of Hilary Benn.

== Background and education ==
Born in Hackney, Benn was the second son of Sir John Benn, 1st Baronet. He was given the name Wedgwood because his mother, Elizabeth (Lily) Pickstone, was a distant relative of Josiah Wedgwood of the pottery family. Benn was educated at the Lycée Condorcet in Paris and at University College, London. His elder brother was the publisher, writer and political publicist Ernest Benn.

== Political career ==
Wedgwood Benn c. 1906

Benn was elected as a Liberal Member of Parliament (MP) for the St George's division of Tower Hamlets in east London in 1906, holding the seat until 1918; his father had previously held the seat from 1892 to 1895. Between 1910 and 1915, he served in the Liberal government as a Lord of the Treasury (government whip). He was elected for Leith in Scotland in 1918. During the 1924–29 parliament, which was dominated by a Conservative majority, he worked closely with a group of radical Liberal MPs that included Frank Briant, Percy Harris, Joseph Kenworthy and Horace Crawfurd to provide opposition to the government. He sat until March 1927, when he resigned from the Liberal Party and from parliament.

The following year he re-entered parliament as Labour member for Aberdeen North. Labour leader Ramsay MacDonald recognised his talent, and offered the possibility of promotion. Benn served as Secretary of State for India between 1929 and 1931 in MacDonald's second government, and was sworn of the Privy Council in 1929. However, he refused to follow MacDonald into the National Government coalition with the Conservatives, and at the 1931 election lost his seat to John George Burnett. He returned to parliament in 1937, when he was elected for Manchester Gorton.

In 1940, following the internment of thousands of refugees under pressure from the military he spoke up for them in Parliament. In 1942, Benn was raised to the peerage as Viscount Stansgate, of Stansgate in the County of Essex. Two years later, he was appointed Vice President of the Allied Control Commission which was charged with reconstructing a democratic government in Italy. In 1945, he became Secretary of State for Air in Clement Attlee's Labour government, a position he held until October 1946. He then sat as a backbench Labour peer until his death fourteen years later.

From 1947 to 1957, Viscount Stansgate was President of the Council of the Inter-Parliamentary Union (IPU), the world organization of national parliaments. He first took up that office at the IPU's Conference in Cairo in April 1947, where he succeeded Count Henry Carton de Wiart of Belgium. A master in the art of human contacts, passionately interested in international politics, Viscount Stansgate played a major role in bringing the newly independent countries in Asia, the Middle East and Africa into the ranks of the IPU. He was also instrumental in re-establishing the membership of parliaments of Eastern European countries, thus bringing the IPU nearer to its traditional objective – universality.

== Military career ==
Capt. Wedgwood Benn c. 1918

Although aged 37 at the time the First World War broke out, Benn was commissioned on 8 December 1914 as a second lieutenant in the Middlesex Yeomanry (Duke of Cambridge's Hussars). On 12 May 1916, he was appointed an observer flying officer in the Royal Flying Corps. On 8 July 1916, he was appointed as the commanding officer of a seaplane observer squadron, with the temporary rank of captain. Seeing service at Gallipoli, he was seconded to the Royal Naval Air Service on 17 May 1917. He was awarded the DSO on 4 June 1917 He was promoted to lieutenant on 10 July 1917 (seniority from 1 June 1916, and with full pay and allowances from 1 July 1917). On 12 July 1918, Benn transferred to the Royal Air Force, and was appointed a temporary staff officer 3rd class, retaining his temporary captaincy.

In September 1918, he was awarded the DFC. The citation read:

A gallant observer of exceptional ability. After setting out on a bombing raid, the Scout machines assigned to act as an escort became separated, and it then became necessary for the bombing planes to proceed on their task without support. Captain Benn's machine took the lead, followed by three other bombers, and succeeded in dropping his bombs (direct hits) on an enemy aerodrome. On the return journey the bombing machines were attacked by several enemy scouts, which were eventually driven away. Recently, this officer organised and carried out a special flight by night over the enemy's lines, under most difficult circumstances, with conspicuous success. He has at all times set a splendid example of courage (21 September 1918).

Also in September 1918 (night of 8–9 September) he and William George Barker flying a Savoia-Pomilio SP.4 aeroplane, specially equipped for a parachute drop. This was the first military parachute/spy mission. The parachutist was Alessandro Tandura (1893–1937), who parachuted behind enemy lines in the vicinity of the Piave river. In November, he was awarded the Bronze Medal of Military Valour by the Italian Government. After his return to politics, Benn resigned his commission in the RAF on 28 December 1918, retaining the rank of captain.

Though in his early 60s at start of the Second World War, Benn returned to military flying, joining the Royal Air Force Volunteer Reserve as a war-substantive pilot officer (on probation) on 27 May 1940, with the service number 79452. He was promoted to flying officer (war substantive) on 7 December, and was confirmed in his rank on 27 May 1941. Promoted in 1942 to the substantive rank of flight lieutenant, he was promoted to group captain (war substantive) on 29 December 1942, skipping two ranks. Following his promotion to acting air commodore in 1944, he served as Director of Public Relations at the Air Ministry. At the age of 67 he flew several flights operationally as an RAF Bomber Aircrew gunner, and is possibly the oldest man to have done so. He resigned his commission on 3 August 1945, retaining the rank of air commodore.

== Family ==
Lord Stansgate married Margaret Holmes, daughter of Daniel Holmes, in 1920. His eldest son Michael Wedgwood Benn was killed in the Second World War in 1944. Stansgate died at Westminster, London, in November 1960, aged 83, and was succeeded in the viscountcy by his second son, then known as Anthony Wedgwood Benn (1925–2014), who was successful in 1963 in his campaign to change the law to allow him and others to disclaim their peerages for life. His youngest son, David Wedgwood Benn (1928–2017), a specialist in Russia and Eastern Europe, worked for the BBC's External Services for many years. A fourth son, Jeremy, was stillborn.

== Arms ==
Coat of arms of Viscount Stansgate
Crest On a rock a spear erect proper, flowing therefrom a pennon azure, charged with the word “Onward”, letters or. Escutcheon Argent, two barrulets indented gules, between in chief as many dragons’ heads erased and in base a pencil and a pen in saltire proper, tied with a lace azure, pendent therefrom a torteau, charged with a figure “1914” or. Motto Deo Favente (By God's favour).

Parliament of the United Kingdom
Preceded by Thomas Dewar	Member of Parliament for St George's; 1906 – 1918	Constituency abolished
New constituency	Member of Parliament for Leith; 1918 – 1927	Succeeded by Ernest Brown
Preceded by Frank Rose	Member of Parliament for Aberdeen North; 1928– 1931	Succeeded by John George Burnett
Preceded by Joseph Compton	Member of Parliament for Manchester Gorton; 1937–1942	Succeeded by William Oldfield
Political offices
Preceded by The Viscount Peel	Secretary of State for India; 1929–1931	Succeeded by Sir Samuel Hoare, Bt
Preceded by Harold Macmillan	Secretary of State for Air; 1945–1946	Succeeded by Philip Noel-Baker
Military offices
Preceded by H Peake	Director of Public Relations (RAF); 1942–1943	Succeeded by H A Jones
Peerage of the United Kingdom
New creation	Viscount Stansgate; 1942–1960	Succeeded by Tony Benn
