= Afzal Khan (British politician) =

British Labour Party politician (born 1958)

Afzal Khan CBE MP
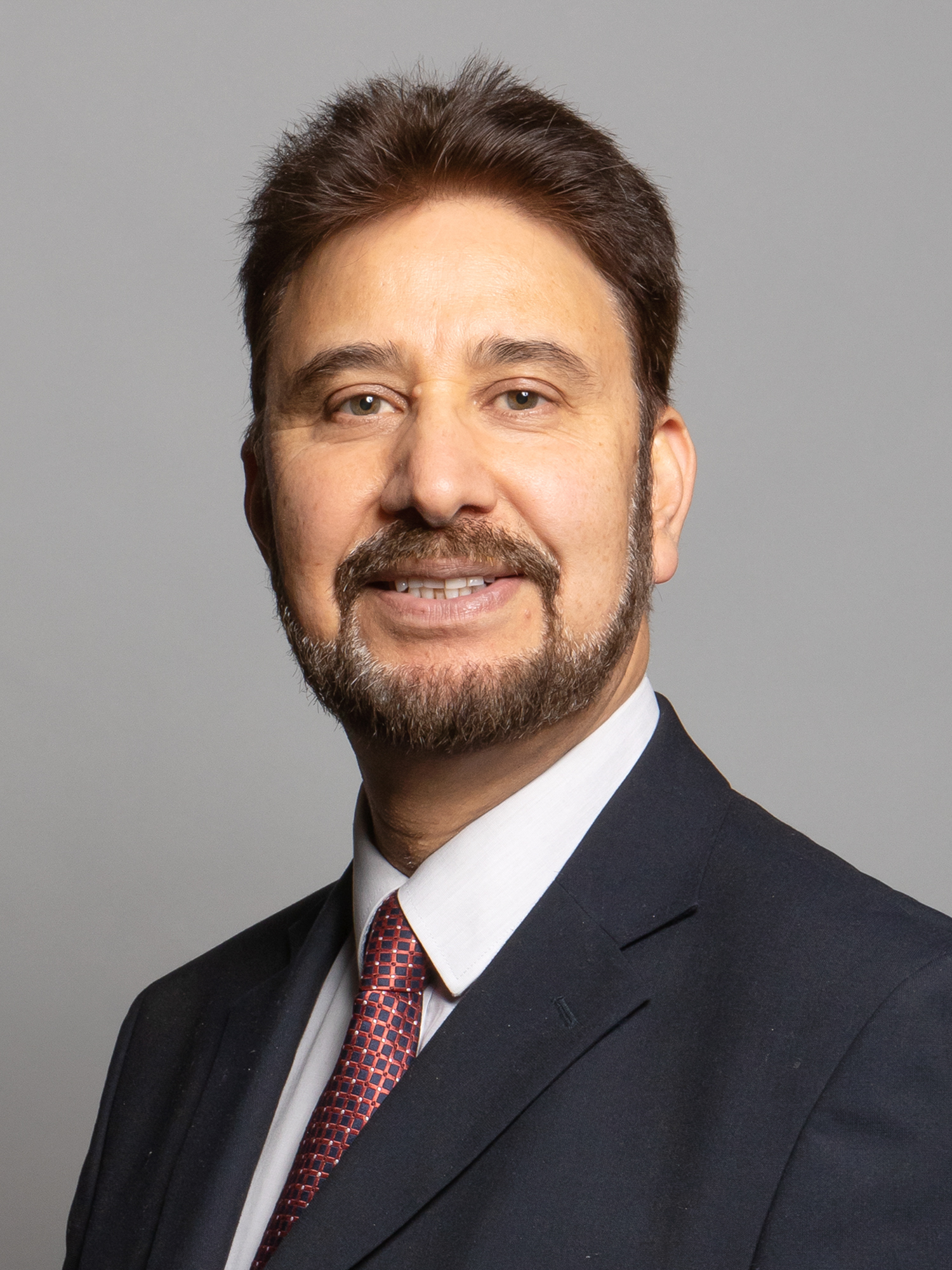
- Official portrait, 2020

Member of Parliament for Manchester Rusholme Manchester Gorton (2017–2024)
- Incumbent
- Assumed office 8 June 2017
- Preceded by: Gerald Kaufman
- Majority: 8,235 (28.4%)
Shadow portfolios
2023	Exports
2021–2023	Legal Aid
2020–2021	Deputy Commons Leader
2020	South Asia, Africa and Commonwealth
2017–2020	Immigration

Member of the European Parliament for North West England
- In office 13 June 2014 – 8 June 2017
- Preceded by: Chris Davies
- Succeeded by: Wajid Khan

Lord Mayor of Manchester
- In office 2005 – 17 May 2006
- Preceded by: Tom O'Callaghan
- Succeeded by: James Ashley

Member of Manchester City Council for Cheetham
- In office 4 May 2000 – 6 May 2015
- Preceded by: Christopher Olaniyan
- Succeeded by: Julie Connolly

Personal details
- Born: Mohammed Afzal Khan; 5 April 1958 (age 68) Jhelum, Punjab, Pakistan
- Party: Labour Co-op
- Spouse: Shkeela Kayani (m. 1979)
- Children: 3
- Education: Manchester Metropolitan University (LLB)
- Website: www.afzalkhan.org.uk

Mohammed Afzal Khan (Note: Urdu: محمد افضل خان) (born 5 April 1958) is a British-Pakistani politician who has served as the Member of Parliament (MP) for Manchester Rusholme, previously Manchester Gorton, since 2017. He is a member of the Labour Party.

He was formerly Lord Mayor of Manchester for 2005–2006, and served as a Member of the European Parliament (MEP) for North West England from 2014 to 2017.

== Early life and education ==
Mohammed Afzal Khan was born on 5 April 1958 in Jhelum, Punjab, Pakistan, before coming to the UK aged 11. After leaving school without any qualifications, he had a number of jobs, including as a police officer for Greater Manchester Police, a labourer and bus driver. He returned to education at Abraham Moss College and got a degree in law from Manchester Metropolitan University before qualifying as a solicitor in 1996.

== Political career ==
Khan started his political career in local government before moving to the European Parliament and then the Parliament of the United Kingdom after becoming an MP in the 2017 general election.

=== Local government ===
Khan was first elected a Labour councillor in 2000, being re-elected in 2004, 2007 and 2011, representing Cheetham Ward. He served as Executive Member for Children's Services.

From 2000 to 2004, Khan was a member of the Department of Trade and Industry's Ethnic Minority Business Forum, advising the then Secretary of State, Patricia Hewitt.

Khan became the first Muslim Lord Mayor of Manchester, taking the position for 2005–2006.

Following the 2005 London bombings, he became a member of a Home Office working group aimed at preventing extremism.

In 2008, he was appointed a Commander of the Order of the British Empire (CBE) for his work on race relations.

He has also served as Assistant Secretary-General of the Muslim Council of Britain and is its North West representative.

In 2011, Khan was suggested as a candidate for Oldham East and Saddleworth. In 2012, he was a potential candidate for the Bradford West by-election but lost the nomination to Imran Hussain, who was defeated by Respect Party candidate, George Galloway.

=== European Parliament ===
Khan was selected in February 2013 on the Labour Party's list for North West England at the European Parliamentary election of 2014 and, on 22 May 2014, he was returned as MEP to the European Parliament to represent North West England.

In January 2016, Khan was appointed by the Progressive Alliance of Socialists and Democrats in the European Parliament as Special Representative to Muslim Communities. In this function, Khan visited Germany, the United Kingdom, Italy, France and Denmark for work with local Muslim communities and invited groups of young Muslims to the Parliament.

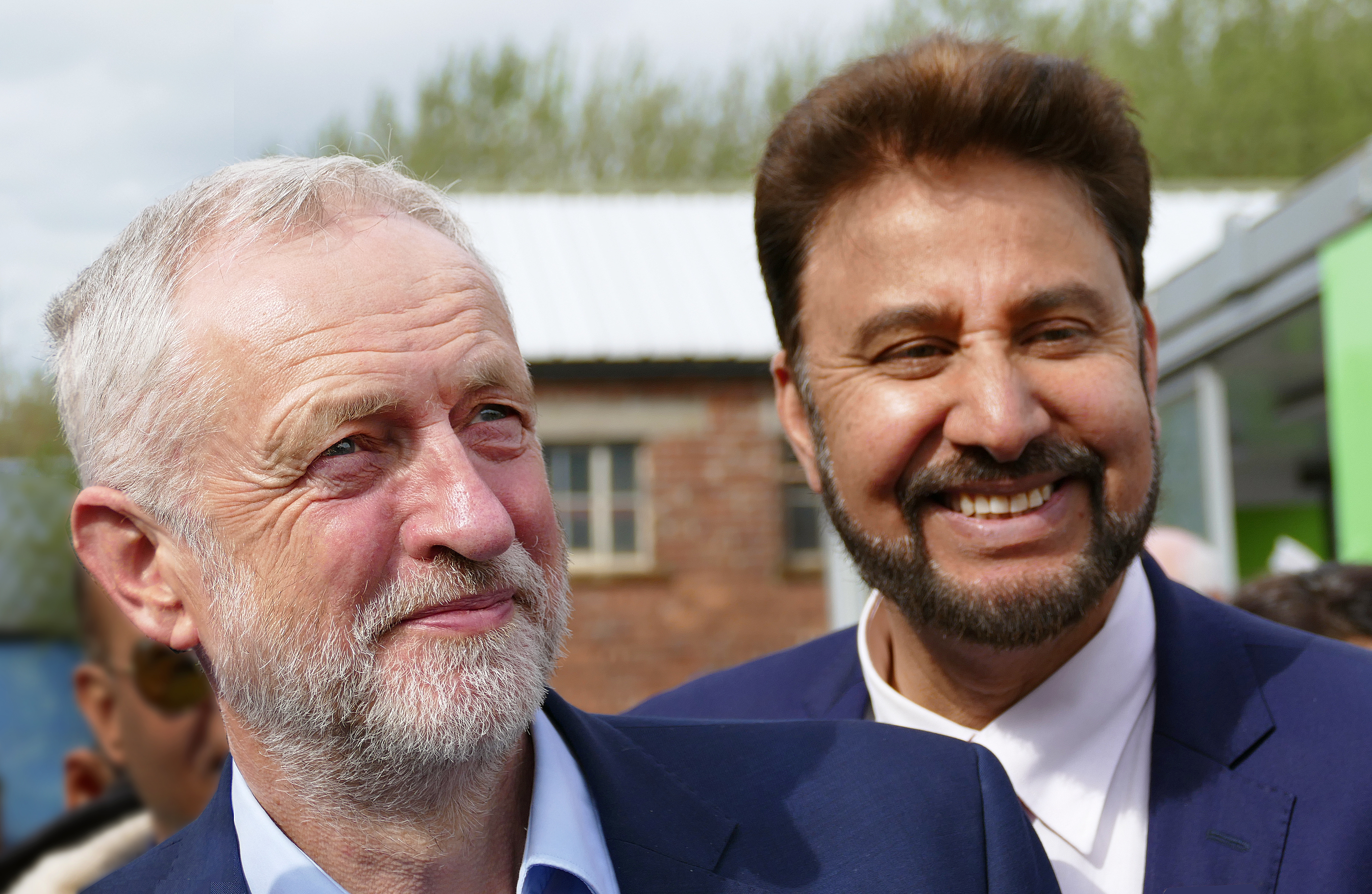
Khan campaigning with Labour leader Jeremy Corbyn as part of the cancelled Manchester Gorton by-election.

== Parliamentary career ==
In March 2017, Khan applied to be Labour's candidate in the 2017 Manchester Gorton by-election and was officially selected on 22 March. Prior to the election, he said "I condemn the statements made by Ken Livingstone and I believe there is no place for anti-Semitism in the Labour Party." He added, "I have been a lifelong campaigner against racism and anti-Semitism. In 2008, I was awarded a CBE in part for my work encouraging greater understanding between Muslims and Jews. I intend to continue this work if I am elected as MP for Manchester Gorton."

The by-election was cancelled following the dissolution of Parliament for the early general election on 8 June 2017. Khan was elected to Parliament as MP for Manchester Gorton with 76.3% of the vote and a majority of 31,730. In July 2017, Khan was appointed Shadow Immigration Minister.

In March 2018, Khan received a suspicious package containing an anti-Islamic letter and sticky liquid. The substance was later found to be harmless. Similar packages were received by fellow Labour MPs Mohammad Yasin, Rushanara Ali and Rupa Huq.

In July 2019, Khan apologised for having shared on Facebook two years earlier a video of American comedian Jon Stewart talking about Benjamin Netanyahu. The text under the video referred to an "Israel-British-Swiss-Rothschilds crime syndicate" and "mass murdering Rothschilds Israeli mafia criminal liars". Khan said he was "mortified", adding "I didn't read the text below, which contained an anti-Semitic conspiracy about the Rothschilds. I would never have shared it if I had seen that".

At the 2019 general election, Khan was re-elected with an increased vote share of 77.6% and a decreased majority of 30,339.

From August 2020 to 2022, Khan served as parliamentary chair for the Labour Muslim Network.

In the September 2023 shadow cabinet reshuffle, he was appointed Shadow Minister for Exports. One month later Khan resigned from the frontbench to vote for a Scottish National Party (SNP) motion demanding a ceasefire in Gaza.

Due to the 2023 review of Westminster constituencies, Khan's constituency of Manchester Gorton was abolished, and replaced with Manchester Rusholme. At the 2024 general election, Khan was elected to Parliament as MP for Manchester Rusholme with 51.9% of the vote and a majority of 8,235.

In August 2025 he resigned as trade envoy for Turkey following calls for his resignation following a visit to the self-declared Turkish republic of Northern Cyprus which he had been invited to and given he had met the Turkish-Cypriot President there which the official Cypriot government described as "absolutely condemnable and unacceptable". He remained a Member of Parliament.

== Personal life ==
Khan is married to Shkeela Kayani with whom he has one son and two daughters. One of his daughters, Maryam, served as a councillor for Longsight on Manchester City Council.

In June 2025, Khan was criticised for appearing at an event in Stockport alongside Lord Ahmed, who was convicted of sex offences in 2022. Khan claimed he left when he realised Lord Ahmed was present, but this was later contradicted by videos from the event of them walking side-by-side, and photos of them sitting together.

== Notes ==
Parliament of the United Kingdom
Preceded by Sir Gerald Kaufman	Member of Parliament for Manchester Gorton; 2017–2024	Constituency abolished
New constituency	Member of Parliament for Manchester Rusholme; 2024–present	Incumbent
Honorary titles
Preceded by Tom O'Callaghan	Lord Mayor of Manchester; 2005–2006	Succeeded by James Ashley
