= Gorton North =

- Ward
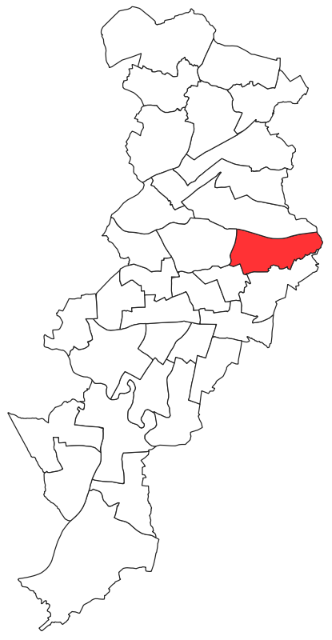
- Gorton North ward (2004) within Manchester

- Coat of arms
- Interactive map of Gorton North
- Country: United Kingdom
- Constituent country: England
- Region: North West England
- County: Greater Manchester
- Metropolitan borough: Manchester
- Created: November 1909
- Named for: Gorton

Government
  - Type: Unicameral
  - Body: Manchester City Council
- UK Parliamentary Constituency: Gorton and Denton

Gorton North was an electoral division of Manchester City Council which was represented from 1909 until 2018. It covered part of Gorton and Abbey Hey in East Manchester.

== Overview ==
Gorton North ward was created in 1909, as a result of the Manchester Extension Scheme 1909, which transferred the urban districts of Gorton and Levenshulme to the Manchester corporation. Its initial boundaries were unaffected by city-wide boundary revisions in 1919. After boundary revisions in 1950, the ward's northern boundary became the Great Central Main Line and its southern boundary became Hyde Road, while further revisions in 1971 extended the ward's western boundary to Belle Vue Street. In 1982, the ward incorporated that part of the Gorton South ward to the east of the Fallowfield Loop. Following another boundary revision in 2004, the ward's southern boundary became the Gore Brook. In 2018, the ward was abolished, and its remaining area became part of the new Gorton and Abbey Hey ward.

From 1909 until 1918, the ward formed part of the Gorton Parliamentary constituency. From 1918 until its abolition, it was part of the Manchester Gorton Parliamentary constituency.

== Councillors ==
Election	Councillor	Councillor	Councillor
1909	T. Higginson (Lab)	J. P. Greenall (Lab)	J. A. Lofts (Con)
1910	T. Higginson (Lab)	J. P. Greenall (Lab)	W. Davy (Lab)
1911	T. Higginson (Lab)	J. P. Greenall (Lab)	W. Davy (Lab)
1912	T. Higginson (Lab)	J. P. Greenall (Lab)	W. Davy (Lab)
1913	T. Higginson (Lab)	J. P. Greenall (Lab)	W. Davy (Lab)
1914	T. Higginson (Lab)	J. P. Greenall (Lab)	W. Davy (Lab)
1919	J. Compton (Lab)	J. P. Greenall (Lab)	W. Davy (Lab)
1920	J. Compton (Lab)	J. P. Greenall (Lab)	W. Davy (Lab)
October 1921	J. Compton (Lab)	J. P. Greenall (Ind. Labour)	W. Davy (Lab)
1921	J. Compton (Lab)	W. Docker (Con)	W. Davy (Lab)
1922	J. Compton (Lab)	W. Docker (Con)	W. Davy (Lab)
1923	J. Compton (Lab)	W. Docker (Con)	W. Davy (Lab)
1924	J. Compton (Lab)	T. Walker (Lab)	W. Davy (Lab)
1925	T. F. Regan (Lab)	T. Walker (Lab)	W. Davy (Lab)
1926	T. F. Regan (Lab)	T. Walker (Lab)	W. Davy (Lab)
1927	T. F. Regan (Lab)	T. Walker (Lab)	W. Davy (Lab)
1928	T. F. Regan (Lab)	T. Walker (Lab)	W. Davy (Lab)
May 1929	T. F. Regan (Lab)	T. Walker (Lab)	S. H. Hitchbun (Lab)
1929	T. F. Regan (Lab)	T. Walker (Lab)	S. H. Hitchbun (Lab)
1930	T. F. Regan (Lab)	T. Walker (Lab)	S. H. Hitchbun (Lab)
1931	T. F. Regan (Lab)	T. Walker (Lab)	S. H. Hitchbun (Lab)
1932	T. F. Regan (Lab)	T. Walker (Lab)	S. H. Hitchbun (Lab)
1933	T. F. Regan (Lab)	T. Walker (Lab)	S. H. Hitchbun (Lab)
1934	T. F. Regan (Lab)	T. Walker (Lab)	S. H. Hitchbun (Lab)
1935	T. F. Regan (Lab)	T. Walker (Lab)	S. H. Hitchbun (Lab)
1936	T. F. Regan (Lab)	T. Walker (Lab)	S. H. Hitchbun (Lab)
1937	T. F. Regan (Lab)	T. Walker (Lab)	S. H. Hitchbun (Lab)
1938	T. F. Regan (Lab)	T. Walker (Lab)	S. H. Hitchbun (Lab)
1945	S. H. Hitchbun (Lab)	F. Lord (Lab)	C. Bentley (Lab)
1946	S. H. Hitchbun (Lab)	F. Lord (Lab)	C. Bentley (Lab)
January 1947	F. Siddall (Lab)	F. Lord (Lab)	C. Bentley (Lab)
1947	F. Siddall (Lab)	F. Lord (Lab)	C. Bentley (Lab)
1949	F. Siddall (Lab)	F. Lord (Lab)	C. Bentley (Lab)
1950	F. Siddall (Lab)	F. Lord (Lab)	C. Bentley (Lab)
1951	F. Siddall (Lab)	F. Lord (Lab)	C. Bentley (Lab)
1952	F. Siddall (Lab)	F. Lord (Lab)	C. Bentley (Lab)
1953	F. Siddall (Lab)	F. Lord (Lab)	C. Bentley (Lab)
December 1953	F. Siddall (Lab)	F. Lord (Lab)	P. Roddy (Lab)
1954	F. Siddall (Lab)	F. Lord (Lab)	P. Roddy (Lab)
1955	F. Siddall (Lab)	F. Lord (Lab)	P. Roddy (Lab)
1956	F. Siddall (Lab)	F. Lord (Lab)	P. Roddy (Lab)
April 1957	F. Siddall (Lab)	N. Leech (Lab)	P. Roddy (Lab)
1957	F. Siddall (Lab)	N. Leech (Lab)	P. Roddy (Lab)
1958	W. Higgins (Lab)	N. Leech (Lab)	P. Roddy (Lab)
1959	W. Higgins (Lab)	N. Leech (Lab)	P. Roddy (Lab)
1960	W. Higgins (Lab)	N. Leech (Lab)	P. Roddy (Lab)
1961	W. Higgins (Lab)	N. Leech (Lab)	P. Roddy (Lab)
1962	W. Higgins (Lab)	N. Leech (Lab)	P. Roddy (Lab)
1963	W. Higgins (Lab)	N. Leech (Lab)	P. Roddy (Lab)
1964	W. Higgins (Lab)	N. Leech (Lab)	P. Roddy (Lab)
1965	W. Higgins (Lab)	N. Leech (Lab)	P. Roddy (Lab)
1966	W. Higgins (Lab)	N. Leech (Lab)	P. Roddy (Lab)
1967	W. Higgins (Lab)	N. Leech (Lab)	P. Roddy (Lab)
1968	G. H. Gilbertson (Con)	N. Leech (Lab)	P. Roddy (Lab)
1969	G. H. Gilbertson (Con)	N. Leech (Lab)	P. Roddy (Lab)
1970	G. H. Gilbertson (Con)	G. Conquest (Lab)	P. Roddy (Lab)
1971	P. Roddy (Lab)	T. O. Hamnett (Lab)	G. Conquest (Lab)
July 1971	P. Bednarski (Lab)	T. O. Hamnett (Lab)	G. Conquest (Lab)
1972	P. Bednarski (Lab)	T. O. Hamnett (Lab)	G. Conquest (Lab)
1973	G. Conquest (Lab)	C. Brierley (Lab)	P. Bednarski (Lab)
1975	G. Conquest (Lab)	C. Brierley (Lab)	G. Halstead (Lab)
1976	G. Conquest (Lab)	C. Brierley (Lab)	G. Halstead (Lab)
1978	T. O. Hamnett (Lab)	C. Brierley (Lab)	G. Halstead (Lab)
1979	T. O. Hamnett (Lab)	C. Brierley (Lab)	P. Hildrew (Lab)
1980	T. O. Hamnett (Lab)	C. Brierley (Lab)	P. Hildrew (Lab)
1982	C. Brierley (Lab)	T. O. Hamnett (Lab)	P. Hildrew (Lab)
1983	C. Brierley (Lab)	T. O. Hamnett (Lab)	J. Wilson (Lab)
1984	C. Brierley (Lab)	T. O. Hamnett (Lab)	J. Wilson (Lab)
1986	C. Brierley (Lab)	T. O. Hamnett (Lab)	J. Wilson (Lab)
1987	C. Brierley (Lab)	T. O. Hamnett (Lab)	A. Unwin (Lab)
1988	C. Brierley (Lab)	T. O. Hamnett (Lab)	A. Unwin (Lab)
1990	C. Brierley (Lab)	T. O. Hamnett (Lab)	A. Unwin (Lab)
1991	C. Brierley (Lab)	T. O. Hamnett (Lab)	J. Pearcey (Lib Dem)
1992	C. Brierley (Lab)	I. Donaldson (Lib Dem)	J. Pearcey (Lib Dem)
1994	W. Helsby (Lib Dem)	I. Donaldson (Lib Dem)	J. Pearcey (Lib Dem)
1995	W. Helsby (Lib Dem)	I. Donaldson (Lib Dem)	J. Pearcey (Lib Dem)
1996	W. Helsby (Lib Dem)	I. Donaldson (Lib Dem)	J. Pearcey (Lib Dem)
1998	W. Helsby (Lib Dem)	I. Donaldson (Lib Dem)	J. Pearcey (Lib Dem)
1999	W. Helsby (Lib Dem)	I. Donaldson (Lib Dem)	J. Pearcey (Lib Dem)
2000	W. Helsby (Lib Dem)	I. Donaldson (Lib Dem)	J. Pearcey (Lib Dem)
2002	W. Helsby (Lib Dem)	I. Donaldson (Lib Dem)	J. Pearcey (Lib Dem)
2003	W. Helsby (Lib Dem)	I. Donaldson (Lib Dem)	J. Pearcey (Lib Dem)
2004	Jacqueline Pearcey (Lib Dem)	Wendy Helsby (Lib Dem)	Bernardette Newing (Lib Dem)
2006	Jacqueline Pearcey (Lib Dem)	Wendy Helsby (Lib Dem)	Nilofar Siddiqi (Lab)
2007	Jacqueline Pearcey (Lib Dem)	Wendy Helsby (Lib Dem)	Nilofar Siddiqi (Lab)
2008	Jacqueline Pearcey (Lib Dem)	Wendy Helsby (Lib Dem)	Nilofar Siddiqi (Lab)
2010	Jacqueline Pearcey (Lib Dem)	Wendy Helsby (Lib Dem)	Nilofar Siddiqi (Lab)
2011	Jacqueline Pearcey (Lib Dem)	John Hughes (Lab)	Nilofar Siddiqi (Lab)
2012	Afia Kamal (Lab)	John Hughes (Lab)	Nilofar Siddiqi (Lab)
2014	Afia Kamal (Lab)	John Hughes (Lab)	Nilofar Siddiqi (Lab)
2015	Afia Kamal (Lab)	John Hughes (Lab)	Nilofar Siddiqi (Lab)
2016	Afia Kamal (Lab)	John Hughes (Lab)	Nilofar Siddiqi (Lab)

== Elections ==
=== Elections in 1900s ===
==== November 1909 ====
1909 (3 vacancies)
Party	Candidate	Votes	%	±%
Labour	T. Higginson	1,192	53.3	
Labour	J. P. Greenall	1,133	50.7	
Conservative	J. A. Lofts	1,108	49.6	
Labour	W. Davy	1,103	49.3	
Conservative	J. Pollitt	1,098	49.1	
Liberal	M. Bushell	1,072	47.9	
Majority		5	0.3	
Turnout		2,236		
Labour win (new seat)				
Labour win (new seat)				
Conservative win (new seat)				

=== Elections in 1910s ===
==== November 1910 ====
1910
Party	Candidate	Votes	%	±%
Labour	W. Davy	1,018	53.8	+0.5
Conservative	J. A. Lofts*	875	46.2	−3.4
Majority		143	7.6	
Turnout		1,893		
Labour gain from Conservative		Swing		

==== November 1911 ====
1911
Party	Candidate	Votes	%	±%
Labour	J. P. Greenall*	1,317	59.2	+5.4
Conservative	R. G. Murray	906	40.8	−5.4
Majority		411	18.4	+10.8
Turnout		2,223		
Labour hold		Swing		

==== November 1912 ====
1912
Party	Candidate	Votes	%	±%
Labour	T. Higginson*	uncontested		
Labour hold		Swing		

==== November 1913 ====
1913
Party	Candidate	Votes	%	±%
Labour	W. Davy*	1,258	85.9	N/A
Independent	J. Harold	207	14.1	N/A
Majority		1,051	71.8	N/A
Turnout		1,465		
Labour hold		Swing		

==== November 1914 ====
1914
Party	Candidate	Votes	%	±%
Labour	J. P. Greenall*	uncontested		
Labour hold		Swing		

==== November 1919 ====
1919 (new boundaries)
Party	Candidate	Votes	%	±%
Labour	J. Compton	2,201	75.4	
Coalition Labour	F. Zanetti	719	24.6	
Majority		1,482	50.8	
Turnout		2,920	30.0	
Labour hold		Swing		

=== Elections in 1920s ===
==== November 1920 ====
1920
Party	Candidate	Votes	%	±%
Labour	W. Davy*	uncontested		
Labour hold		Swing		

==== November 1921 ====
1921
Party	Candidate	Votes	%	±%
Conservative	W. Docker	2,216	36.9	N/A
Labour	A. Mason	1,748	29.1	N/A
Independent Labour	J. P. Greenall*	1,210	20.1	N/A
National Unemployed Workers' Movement	J. Shaw	839	14.0	N/A
Majority		468	7.8	N/A
Turnout		6,013	60.7	N/A
Conservative gain from Independent Labour		Swing		

==== November 1922 ====
1922
Party	Candidate	Votes	%	±%
Labour	J. Compton*	3,479	63.8	+34.7
Conservative	R. S. Ireland	1,970	36.2	−0.7
Majority		1,509	27.6	
Turnout		5,449	54.4	−6.3
Labour hold		Swing		

==== November 1923 ====
1923
Party	Candidate	Votes	%	±%
Labour	W. Davy*	uncontested		
Labour hold		Swing		

==== November 1924 ====
1924
Party	Candidate	Votes	%	±%
Labour	T. Walker	3,842	64.0	N/A
Conservative	E. E. Walsh	2,164	36.0	N/A
Majority		1,678	28.0	N/A
Turnout		6,006		
Labour gain from Conservative		Swing		

==== November 1925 ====
1925
Party	Candidate	Votes	%	±%
Labour	T. F. Regan	uncontested		
Labour hold		Swing		

==== November 1926 ====
1926
Party	Candidate	Votes	%	±%
Labour	W. Davy*	uncontested		
Labour hold		Swing		

==== November 1927 ====
1927
Party	Candidate	Votes	%	±%
Labour	T. Walker*	uncontested		
Labour hold		Swing		

==== November 1928 ====
1928
Party	Candidate	Votes	%	±%
Labour	T. F. Regan*	uncontested		
Labour hold		Swing		

==== May 1929 (by-election) ====
By-election: 14 May 1929
Party	Candidate	Votes	%	±%
Labour	S. H. Hitchbun	3,284	68.6	N/A
Conservative	G. Taylor	1,501	31.4	N/A
Majority		1,783	37.2	N/A
Turnout		4,785		
Labour hold		Swing		

==== November 1929 ====
1929
Party	Candidate	Votes	%	±%
Labour	S. H. Hitchbun*	uncontested		
Labour hold		Swing		

=== Elections in 1930s ===
==== November 1930 ====
1930
Party	Candidate	Votes	%	±%
Labour	T. Walker*	2,793	70.2	N/A
Liberal	T. Dunbevand	1,184	29.8	N/A
Majority		1,609	40.4	N/A
Turnout		3,977		
Labour hold		Swing		

==== November 1931 ====
1931
Party	Candidate	Votes	%	±%
Labour	T. F. Regan*	3,623	56.4	−13.8
Conservative	H. S. Birch	2,797	43.6	N/A
Majority		826	12.8	−27.6
Turnout		6,420	59.1	
Labour hold		Swing		

==== November 1932 ====
1932
Party	Candidate	Votes	%	±%
Labour	S. H. Hitchbun*	4,017	72.1	+15.7
Liberal	H. Quinney	1,553	27.9	N/A
Majority		2,464	44.2	−31.4
Turnout		5,570		
Labour hold		Swing		

==== November 1933 ====
1933
Party	Candidate	Votes	%	±%
Labour	T. Walker*	uncontested		
Labour hold		Swing		

==== November 1934 ====
1934
Party	Candidate	Votes	%	±%
Labour	T. F. Regan*	3,559	73.2	N/A
Conservative	S. Bloor	1,305	26.8	N/A
Majority		2,254	46.4	N/A
Turnout		4,864		
Labour hold		Swing		

==== November 1935 ====
1935
Party	Candidate	Votes	%	±%
Labour	S. H. Hitchbun*	uncontested		
Labour hold		Swing		

==== November 1936 ====
1936
Party	Candidate	Votes	%	±%
Labour	T. Walker*	uncontested		
Labour hold		Swing		

==== November 1937 ====
1937
Party	Candidate	Votes	%	±%
Labour	T. F. Regan*	3,561	63.7	N/A
Conservative	G. M. Brewster	2,032	36.3	N/A
Majority		1,529	27.4	N/A
Turnout		5,593		
Labour hold		Swing		

==== November 1938 ====
1938
Party	Candidate	Votes	%	±%
Labour	S. H. Hitchbun*	uncontested		
Labour hold		Swing		

=== Elections in 1940s ===
==== November 1945 ====
1945 (2 vacancies)
Party	Candidate	Votes	%	±%
Labour	F. Lord*	4,660	75.0	N/A
Labour	C. Bentley*	4,610	74.2	N/A
Conservative	C. Parker	1,551	25.0	N/A
Majority		3,059	49.2	N/A
Turnout		6,211	39.5	
Labour hold		Swing		
Labour hold		Swing		

==== November 1946 ====
1946
Party	Candidate	Votes	%	±%
Labour	S. H. Hitchbun*	4,112	66.9	−8.1
Conservative	G. Mowbray	1,599	26.0	+1.0
Liberal	J. T. Barker	436	7.1	N/A
Majority		2,513	40.9	−8.3
Turnout		6,147		
Labour hold		Swing		

==== January 1947 (by-election) ====
By-election: 23 January 1947
Party	Candidate	Votes	%	±%
Labour	P. Siddall	2,848	50.8	−16.1
Conservative	H. Knight	2,565	45.7	+19.7
Liberal	J. T. Barker	195	3.5	−3.6
Majority		283	5.1	−35.8
Turnout		5,608		
Labour hold		Swing		

==== November 1947 ====
1947
Party	Candidate	Votes	%	±%
Labour	C. Bentley*	5,304	55.6	−11.3
Conservative	J. P. Traynor	4,231	44.4	+18.4
Majority		1,073	11.2	−29.7
Turnout		9,535		
Labour hold		Swing		

==== May 1949 ====
1949
Party	Candidate	Votes	%	±%
Labour	F. Lord*	5,442	58.5	+2.9
Conservative	A. Leach	3,632	39.1	−5.3
Communist	A. Wilde	225	2.4	N/A
Majority		1,810	19.4	+8.2
Turnout		9,299		
Labour hold		Swing		

=== Elections in 1950s ===
==== May 1950 ====
1950 (new boundaries)
Party	Candidate	Votes	%	±%
Labour	F. Siddall*	4,604	67.7	
Conservative	T. Brownrigg	2,042	30.0	
Communist	A. Wilde	150	2.3	
Majority		2,562	37.7	
Turnout		6,796		
Labour hold		Swing		

==== May 1951 ====
1951
Party	Candidate	Votes	%	±%
Labour	C. Bentley*	3,995	60.2	−7.5
Conservative	S. W. Marshall	2,473	37.2	+7.2
Communist	J. Kay	172	2.6	+0.3
Majority		1,522	23.0	−14.7
Turnout		6,640		
Labour hold		Swing		

==== May 1952 ====
1952
Party	Candidate	Votes	%	±%
Labour	F. Lord*	5,888	74.3	+14.1
Conservative	S. W. Marshall	1,820	23.0	−14.2
Communist	J. Kay	218	2.7	+0.1
Majority		4,068	51.3	+28.3
Turnout		7,926		
Labour hold		Swing		

==== May 1953 ====
1953
Party	Candidate	Votes	%	±%
Labour	F. Siddall*	4,692	70.3	−4.0
Conservative	A. P. Osborn	1,801	27.0	+4.0
Communist	J. Kay	184	2.7	0
Majority		2,891	43.3	−8.0
Turnout		6,677		
Labour hold		Swing		

==== December 1953 (by-election) ====
By-election: 10 December 1953
Party	Candidate	Votes	%	±%
Labour	P. Roddy	3,183	69.4	−0.9
Conservative	C. N. Clarke	1,292	28.2	+1.2
Communist	J. Kay	114	2.4	−0.3
Majority		1,891	41.2	−2.1
Turnout		4,589		
Labour hold		Swing		

==== May 1954 ====
1954
Party	Candidate	Votes	%	±%
Labour	P. Roddy*	4,139	73.0	+2.7
Conservative	C. N. Clark	1,385	24.4	−2.6
Communist	J. Kay	145	2.6	−0.1
Majority		2,753	48.6	+5.3
Turnout		5,669		
Labour hold		Swing		

==== May 1955 ====
1955
Party	Candidate	Votes	%	±%
Labour	F. Lord*	3,856	66.2	−6.8
Conservative	L. Lescure	1,825	31.3	+6.9
Communist	J. Kay	143	2.5	−0.1
Majority		2,031	34.9	−13.7
Turnout		5,824		
Labour hold		Swing		

==== May 1956 ====
1956
Party	Candidate	Votes	%	±%
Labour	F. Siddall*	3,556	72.1	+5.9
Conservative	B. H. Farrow	1,376	27.9	−3.4
Majority		2,180	44.2	+9.3
Turnout		4,932		
Labour hold		Swing		

==== April 1957 (by-election) ====
By-election: 4 April 1957
Party	Candidate	Votes	%	±%
Labour	N. Leech	2,901	80.3	+8.2
Conservative	A. Nixon	711	19.7	−8.2
Majority		2,190	60.6	+16.4
Turnout		3,612		
Labour hold		Swing		

==== May 1957 ====
1957
Party	Candidate	Votes	%	±%
Labour	P. Roddy*	3,567	75.7	+3.6
Conservative	B. H. Farrow	1,142	24.3	−3.6
Majority		2,425	51.4	+7.2
Turnout		4,709		
Labour hold		Swing		

==== May 1958 ====
1958 (2 vacancies)
Party	Candidate	Votes	%	±%
Labour	N. Leech*	3,361	85.3	+9.6
Labour	W. Higgins	3,294	83.6	+7.9
Conservative	S. Bancroft	614	15.6	−8.7
Majority		2,680	68.0	+16.6
Turnout		3,942		
Labour hold		Swing		
Labour hold		Swing		

==== May 1959 ====
1959
Party	Candidate	Votes	%	±%
Labour	W. Higgins*	3,628	68.7	−16.6
Conservative	C. N. Clark	1,654	31.3	+15.7
Majority		1,974	37.4	−30.6
Turnout		5,282		
Labour hold		Swing		

=== Elections in 1960s ===
==== May 1960 ====
1960
Party	Candidate	Votes	%	±%
Labour	P. Roddy*	2,610	66.9	−1.8
Conservative	J. Whitwell	1,292	33.1	+1.8
Majority		1,318	33.8	−3.6
Turnout		3,902		
Labour hold		Swing		

==== May 1961 ====
1961
Party	Candidate	Votes	%	±%
Labour	N. Leech*	3,359	69.0	+2.1
Conservative	J. Whitwell	1,512	31.0	−2.1
Majority		1,847	38.0	+4.2
Turnout		4,871		
Labour hold		Swing		

==== May 1962 ====
1962
Party	Candidate	Votes	%	±%
Labour	W. Higgins*	3,243	73.1	+4.1
Conservative	J. Whitwell	1,191	26.9	−4.1
Majority		2,052	46.2	+8.2
Turnout		4,434		
Labour hold		Swing		

==== May 1963 ====
1963
Party	Candidate	Votes	%	±%
Labour	P. Roddy*	3,605	92.0	+18.9
Communist	J. Whitwell	315	8.0	N/A
Majority		3,290	84.0	+37.8
Turnout		3,920		
Labour hold		Swing		

==== May 1964 ====
1964
Party	Candidate	Votes	%	±%
Labour	N. Leech*	2,994	73.5	−18.5
Conservative	J. L. Traynor	838	20.6	N/A
Communist	J. Skelton	241	5.9	−2.1
Majority		2,156	52.9	−31.1
Turnout		4,072		
Labour hold		Swing		

==== May 1965 ====
1965
Party	Candidate	Votes	%	±%
Labour	W. Higgins*	2,055	62.9	−10.6
Conservative	B. Connell	1,085	33.2	+12.6
Communist	J. Skelton	126	3.9	−2.0
Majority		970	29.7	−23.2
Turnout		3,266		
Labour hold		Swing		

==== May 1966 ====
1966
Party	Candidate	Votes	%	±%
Labour	P. Roddy*	2,314	63.5	+0.6
Conservative	H. V. J. Straker	1,212	33.1	+0.1
Communist	B. J. Bush	117	3.2	−0.7
Majority		1,102	30.2	+0.5
Turnout		3,643		
Labour hold		Swing		

==== May 1967 ====
1967
Party	Candidate	Votes	%	±%
Labour	N. Leech*	1,824	46.7	−16.8
Conservative	H. V. J. Straker	1,661	42.5	+9.4
Liberal	K. L. Steventon	295	7.5	N/A
Communist	B. J. Bush	129	3.3	+0.1
Majority		163	4.2	−26.0
Turnout		3,909		
Labour hold		Swing		

==== May 1968 ====
1968
Party	Candidate	Votes	%	±%
Conservative	G. H. Gilbertson	2,172	52.5	+10.0
Labour	W. Lister	1,786	43.2	−3.5
Communist	R. Felton	179	4.3	+1.0
Majority		386	9.3	
Turnout		4,137		
Conservative gain from Labour		Swing		

==== May 1969 ====
1969
Party	Candidate	Votes	%	±%
Labour	P. Roddy*	2,692	56.8	+13.6
Conservative	B. Connell	2,051	43.2	−9.3
Majority		641	13.6	
Turnout		4,743		
Labour hold		Swing		

=== Elections in 1970s ===
==== May 1970 ====
1970
Party	Candidate	Votes	%	±%
Labour	G. Conquest	3,082	65.1	+8.3
Conservative	H. Griffiths	1,653	34.9	−8.3
Majority		1,429	30.2	+16.6
Turnout		4,745		
Labour hold		Swing		

==== May 1971 ====
1971 (3 vacancies; new boundaries)
Party	Candidate	Votes	%	±%
Labour	P. Roddy*	4,389	79.5	
Labour	T. O. Hammett*	4,330	78.4	
Labour	G. Conquest*	4,150	75.2	
Conservative	J. A. Davenport	1,258	22.8	
Conservative	W. Slowe	1,109	20.1	
Conservative	A. R. Leeke	1,025	18.6	
Communist	A. Prior	304	5.5	
Majority		2,892	52.4	
Turnout		5,522		
Labour win (new seat)				
Labour win (new seat)				
Labour win (new seat)				

==== July 1971 (by-election) ====
By-election: 8 July 1971
Party	Candidate	Votes	%	±%
Labour	P. Bednarski	2,121	87.5	+8.0
Conservative	A. R. Leeke	304	12.5	−10.3
Majority		1,817	74.9	+22.5
Turnout		2,425		
Labour hold		Swing		

==== May 1972 ====
1972
Party	Candidate	Votes	%	±%
Labour	G. Conquest*	2,738	70.6	−8.9
Conservative	J. A. Davenport	1,052	27.1	+4.3
Communist	A. Prior	87	2.2	−3.3
Majority		1,686	43.5	−8.9
Turnout		3,877		
Labour hold		Swing		

==== May 1973 ====
1973 (3 vacancies; reorganisation)
Party	Candidate	Votes	%	±%
Labour	G. Conquest*	2,070	65.4	−5.2
Labour	C. Brierley*	2,001	63.2	−7.4
Labour	P. Bednarski	1,975	62.4	−8.2
Conservative	J. B. Bullough	1,016	32.1	+5.0
Conservative	W. Slowe	995	31.4	+4.3
Conservative	T. J. S. Duke	983	31.1	+4.0
Majority		959	30.3	−13.2
Turnout		3,165		
Labour hold		Swing		
Labour hold		Swing		
Labour hold		Swing		

==== May 1975 ====
1975
Party	Candidate	Votes	%	±%
Labour	G. Halstead	1,332	54.9	−12.1
Conservative	R. J. Beale	1,093	45.1	+12.1
Majority		239	9.8	−24.2
Turnout		2,425		
Labour hold		Swing	-12.1	

==== May 1976 ====
1976
Party	Candidate	Votes	%	±%
Labour	C. Brierley*	1,989	59.4	+4.5
Conservative	E. Leadbetter	1,241	37.0	−8.1
Liberal	D. Sandiford	121	3.6	+3.6
Majority		748	22.3	+12.4
Turnout		3,351		
Labour hold		Swing	+6.3	

==== May 1978 ====
1978
Party	Candidate	Votes	%	±%
Labour	T. O. Hamnett*	1,856	56.7	−2.7
Conservative	E. Leadbetter	1,184	36.2	−0.8
Liberal	J. M. Ashley	231	7.1	+3.5
Majority		672	20.5	−1.8
Turnout		3,271	37.7	
Labour hold		Swing	-0.9	

==== May 1979 ====
1979
Party	Candidate	Votes	%	±%
Labour	P. Hildrew	3,871	63.2	+6.5
Conservative	E. Leadbetter	1,845	30.1	−6.1
Liberal	D. Nicholson	411	6.7	−0.4
Majority		2,026	33.1	+12.6
Turnout		6,127	73.2	+35.5
Labour hold		Swing	+6.3	

=== Elections in 1980s ===
==== May 1980 ====
1980
Party	Candidate	Votes	%	±%
Labour	C. Brierley	2,729	75.3	+12.1
Conservative	C. H. T. Webb	736	20.3	−9.8
Liberal	J. M. Hodgson	161	4.4	−2.3
Majority		1,993	55.0	+21.9
Turnout		3,626	42.7	−30.5
Labour hold		Swing	+10.9	

==== May 1982 ====
1982 (3 vacancies; new boundaries)
Party	Candidate	Votes	%	±%
Labour	Colin Brierley*	2,280	49.2	
Labour	Thomas Hamnett*	2,221	47.9	
Labour	Peter Hildrew*	2,116	45.6	
SDP	Gerard Collins	1,168	25.2	
SDP	Zygmunt Gazdecki	1,130	24.4	
SDP	James Rowan	1,068	23.0	
Conservative	Agnes Caroll	950	20.5	
Conservative	Elizabeth Dimmock	901	19.4	
Conservative	Veronica Jones	884	19.1	
Majority		948	20.4	
Turnout		4,637	42.7	
Labour win (new seat)				
Labour win (new seat)				
Labour win (new seat)				

==== May 1983 ====
1983
Party	Candidate	Votes	%	±%
Labour	John Wilson	2,695	54.6	+2.7
Conservative	Christopher McGregor	1,278	25.9	+4.3
SDP	Zygmunt Gazdecki	964	19.5	−7.0
Majority		1,417	28.7	+3.4
Turnout		4,937		
Labour hold		Swing	-0.8	

==== May 1984 ====
1984
Party	Candidate	Votes	%	±%
Labour	Thomas Hamnett*	2,868	68.9	+14.3
Conservative	Christopher McGregor	957	23.0	−2.9
SDP	S. Muir	338	8.1	−11.4
Majority		1,911	45.9	+17.2
Turnout		4,163		
Labour hold		Swing	+8.6	

==== May 1986 ====
1986
Party	Candidate	Votes	%	±%
Labour	C. Brierley*	2,759	68.3	−0.6
Conservative	N. Dentith	666	16.5	−6.5
SDP	S. Wheale	570	14.1	+6.0
Communist	M. Molloy	46	1.1	+1.1
Majority		2,093	51.8	+5.9
Turnout		4,041		
Labour hold		Swing	+2.9	

==== May 1987 ====
1987
Party	Candidate	Votes	%	±%
Labour	Anne Unwin	2,078	45.4	−22.9
SDP	Paul Allanson	1,294	28.3	+14.2
Conservative	Noel Dentith	1,203	26.3	+9.8
Majority		784	17.1	−34.7
Turnout		4,575		
Labour hold		Swing	-18.5	

==== May 1988 ====
1988
Party	Candidate	Votes	%	±%
Labour	T. Hamnett*	2,226	46.3	+0.9
SLD	J. Pearcey	1,948	40.5	+12.2
Conservative	N. Dentith	638	13.3	−13.0
Majority		278	5.8	−11.3
Turnout		4,812		
Labour hold		Swing	-5.6	

=== Elections in 1990s ===
==== May 1990 ====
1990
Party	Candidate	Votes	%	±%
Labour	C. Brierley*	2,505	48.9	+2.6
Liberal Democrats	J. Pearcey	2,140	41.8	+1.3
Conservative	C. H. T. Webb	351	6.8	−6.5
Green	B. Kellett	129	2.5	+2.5
Majority		365	7.1	+1.3
Turnout		5,125		
Labour hold		Swing	+0.6	

==== May 1991 ====
1991
Party	Candidate	Votes	%	±%
Liberal Democrats	J. Pearcey	2,619	53.0	+11.2
Labour	A. Unwin*	1,621	32.8	−9.0
Independent	T. Mooney	346	7.0	+7.0
Conservative	A. Bourne	305	6.2	−0.6
Green	M. R. Shaw	49	1.0	−1.5
Majority		998	20.2	
Turnout		4,940	45.9	
Liberal Democrats gain from Labour		Swing	+10.1	

==== May 1992 ====
1992
Party	Candidate	Votes	%	±%
Liberal Democrats	I. Donaldson	1,763	50.5	−2.5
Labour	T. Hamnett*	1,403	40.2	+7.4
Conservative	R. West	278	8.0	+1.8
Green	S. Fitzgibbon	45	1.3	+0.3
Majority		360	10.3	−9.9
Turnout		3,489		
Liberal Democrats gain from Labour		Swing	-4.9	

==== May 1994 ====
1994
Party	Candidate	Votes	%	±%
Liberal Democrats	W. Helsby	2,054	51.4	+0.9
Labour	C. Brierley*	1,712	42.8	+2.6
Conservative	P. Davies	170	4.3	−3.7
Green	D. Wild	61	1.5	+0.2
Majority		342	8.6	−1.7
Turnout		3,997		
Liberal Democrats gain from Labour		Swing	-0.8	

==== May 1995 ====
1995
Party	Candidate	Votes	%	±%
Liberal Democrats	Jackie Pearcey*	1,865	51.0	−0.4
Labour	Colin Brierley	1,626	44.5	+1.7
Conservative	Paul Davies	123	3.4	−0.9
Independent	A. Cooper	43	1.2	+1.2
Majority		239	6.5	−2.1
Turnout		3,657		
Liberal Democrats hold		Swing	-1.0	

==== May 1996 ====
1996
Party	Candidate	Votes	%	±%
Liberal Democrats	Iain Donaldson*	1,795	52.2	+1.2
Labour	Bill Egerton	1,466	42.6	−1.9
Conservative	M. Higginbottom	155	4.5	+1.1
Residents	Melanie Jarman	23	0.7	+0.7
Majority		329	9.6	+3.1
Turnout		3,439		
Liberal Democrats hold		Swing	+1.5	

==== May 1998 ====
1998
Party	Candidate	Votes	%	±%
Liberal Democrats	Wendy Helsby*	1,333	50.0	−2.2
Labour	James Battle	1,173	44.0	+1.4
Conservative	Albert Walsh	103	3.9	−0.6
Socialist Labour	Alan Wardlaw	55	2.1	+2.1
Majority		160	6.0	−3.6
Turnout		2,664		
Liberal Democrats hold		Swing	-1.8	

==== May 1999 ====
1999
Party	Candidate	Votes	%	±%
Liberal Democrats	Jacqueline Pearcey*	1,419	54.5	+4.5
Labour	Elaine O'Connor	1,049	40.3	−3.7
Conservative	Simon Davenport	137	5.3	+1.4
Majority		370	14.2	+8.2
Turnout		2,605	26.2	
Liberal Democrats hold		Swing	+4.1	

=== Elections in 2000s ===
==== May 2000 ====
2000
Party	Candidate	Votes	%	±%
Liberal Democrats	Iain Donaldson*	1,060	46.1	−8.4
Labour	Richard Unwin	942	40.9	+0.6
Conservative	Joyce Haydock	137	6.0	+0.7
Independent	Trevor Mooney	122	5.3	+5.3
Green	Paul Slater	40	1.7	+1.7
Majority		118	5.1	−9.1
Turnout		2,301	24.8	−1.4
Liberal Democrats hold		Swing	-4.5	

==== May 2002 ====
2002
Party	Candidate	Votes	%	±%
Liberal Democrats	Wendy Helsby*	1,341	51.0	+4.9
Labour	Richard Unwin	958	36.4	−4.5
Conservative	Lisa Boardman	250	9.5	+3.5
Socialist Alliance	James Martin	43	1.6	+1.6
Green	Roisin MacDowell	38	1.4	−0.3
Majority		383	14.6	+9.5
Turnout		2,630	26.6	+1.8
Liberal Democrats hold		Swing	+4.7	

==== May 2003 ====
2003
Party	Candidate	Votes	%	±%
Liberal Democrats	Jacqueline Pearcey*	1,155	50.7	−0.3
Labour	Allan Grafton	842	36.9	+0.5
Conservative	Lisa Boardman	223	9.8	+0.3
Green	Victoria Bodgers	60	2.6	+1.2
Majority		313	13.7	−0.9
Turnout		2,280	24.0	−2.6
Liberal Democrats hold		Swing	-0.4	

==== June 2004 ====
2004 (3 vacancies; new boundaries)
Party	Candidate	Votes	%	±%
Liberal Democrats	Jacqueline Pearcey*	1,578	46.3	
Liberal Democrats	Wendy Helsby*	1,491	43.7	
Liberal Democrats	Bernadette Newing	1,399	41.0	
Labour	Allan Grafton	1,326	38.9	
Labour	Julie Reid	1,227	36.0	
Labour	Louis Hughes	1,180	34.6	
Conservative	David Blinston	271	7.9	
Conservative	Paul Mostyn	217	6.4	
Conservative	Wesley Roche	199	5.8	
Green	Rachel Harper	177	5.2	
Majority		73	2.1	
Turnout		3,410	33.3	
Liberal Democrats win (new seat)				
Liberal Democrats win (new seat)				
Liberal Democrats win (new seat)				

==== May 2006 ====
2006
Party	Candidate	Votes	%	±%
Labour	Nilofar Siddiqi	1,244	39.7	+0.1
Liberal Democrats	Bernadette Newing*	1,132	36.1	−11.0
Independent	Allan James Grafton	465	14.8	+14.8
Conservative	Patricia Ann Ainscough	144	4.6	−3.5
Green	Rachel Michelle Wilson	78	2.5	−2.8
Independent	David Colin Jones	72	2.3	+2.3
Majority		112	3.6	−3.9
Turnout		3,135	31.4	−1.9
Labour gain from Liberal Democrats		Swing	+5.5	

==== May 2007 ====
2007
Party	Candidate	Votes	%	±%
Liberal Democrats	Wendy Helsby*	1,753	52.3	+16.2
Labour	John Hughes	1,365	40.7	+1.0
Conservative	Joyce Kaye	126	3.8	−0.8
Green	Rachel Wilson	107	3.2	+0.7
Majority		388	11.6	+8.0
Turnout		3,351	31.6	+0.2
Liberal Democrats hold		Swing	+7.6	

==== May 2008 ====
2008
Party	Candidate	Votes	%	±%
Liberal Democrats	Jackie Pearcey*	1,468	48.7	−3.6
Labour	John Hughes	1,156	38.3	−2.4
Conservative	Jane Percival	242	8.0	+4.2
Green	Karl Wardlaw	150	5.0	+1.8
Majority		312	10.3	−1.3
Turnout		3,016	27.5	−4.1
Liberal Democrats hold		Swing	-0.6	

=== Elections in 2010s ===
==== May 2010 ====
2010
Party	Candidate	Votes	%	±%
Labour	Nilofar Siddiqi*	2,356	46.3	+8.0
Liberal Democrats	Rob Copeland	2,046	40.2	−8.5
Conservative	Jean Mee	475	9.3	+1.3
Green	Karl Wardlaw	213	4.2	−0.8
Majority		310	6.1	−4.2
Turnout		5,090	46.4	+18.9
Labour hold		Swing	+8.2	

==== May 2011 ====
2011
Party	Candidate	Votes	%	±%
Labour	John Hughes	2,001	61.1	+20.4
Liberal Democrats	Wendy Helsby*	965	29.5	−22.8
Green	Karl Wardlaw	157	4.8	+1.6
Conservative	Yemi Komolafe	150	4.6	+0.8
Majority		1,036	31.7	
Turnout		3,273	29.2	
Labour gain from Liberal Democrats		Swing		

==== May 2012 ====
2012
Party	Candidate	Votes	%	±%
Labour	Afia Kamal	1,478	53.0	+14.7
Liberal Democrats	Jackie Pearcey*	987	35.4	−13.3
Green	Karl Wardlaw	187	6.7	+1.7
Conservative	Abiodun Opesan	101	3.6	−4.4
Communist League	Andres Mendoza	38	1.4	N/A
Majority		491	18	
Turnout		2,791	24.9	
Labour gain from Liberal Democrats		Swing		

==== May 2014 ====
2014
Party	Candidate	Votes	%	±%
Labour	Nilofar Siddiqi*	2,016	62.09	
Green	Karl Wardlaw	516	15.89	
Liberal Democrats	Andrew Peter Hickey	428	13.18	
Conservative	John Wadsworth-Ladkin	287	8.84	
Majority		1,500	46.2	
Turnout		3,247	28.16	
Labour hold		Swing		

==== May 2015 ====
2015
Party	Candidate	Votes	%	±%
Labour	John Hughes*	3,851	71.1	+10.0
Conservative	Luke Aidan Dyks	591	10.9	+6.3
Green	Karl Wardlaw	469	8.7	+3.9
Liberal Democrats	Dave Page	397	7.3	−22.2
TUSC	Tony Harper	110	2.0	N/A
Majority		3,260	60.2	
Turnout		5,418	48.6	+19.4
Labour hold		Swing		

==== May 2016 ====
2016
Party	Candidate	Votes	%	±%
Labour	Afia Begum Kamal*	1,743	61.0	+8.0
UKIP	Katie Elizabeth Fanning	628	22.0	n/a
Liberal Democrats	Andrew Peter Hickey	194	6.8	−28.6
Conservative	Phelim Rowe	161	5.6	+2.0
Green	Karl Wardlaw	131	4.6	−2.1
Majority		1,115	39.0	
Turnout		2,857	26.80	
Labour hold		Swing		

== See also ==
- Manchester City Council
- Manchester City Council elections
