= Eric Bailey (politician) =

British politician (1905–1989)

Eric Alfred George Shackleton Bailey (28 July 1905 – 12 September 1989) was a British Conservative Party politician. He was elected as Member of Parliament (MP) for Manchester Gorton in the Conservative landslide victory at the 1931 general election, the only time that Labour has lost that seat since 1906. Bailey held Gorton until 1935, when it was regained by Joseph Compton, the Labour MP who he had ousted in 1931.

Parliament of the United Kingdom
Preceded by Joseph Compton	Member of Parliament for Manchester Gorton; 1931 – 1935	Succeeded by Joseph Compton
