= Joseph Compton =

British politician

Compton in 1923

Joseph Compton (21 April 1881 – 18 January 1937) was a British Labour Party politician.

He was elected at the 1923 general election as Member of Parliament (MP) for Manchester Gorton. He had previously contested Swindon at the 1918 and 1922 general elections, without success, and was selected for Gorton when the sitting Labour MP John Hodge retired.

Compton was re-elected in 1924 and in 1929, but was defeated at the 1931 general election (when Labour split of Ramsay MacDonald's decision to form a national government with the Conservatives). He was re-elected at the 1935 general election, and held the seat until his death in 1937, aged 55.

He was chair of the National Executive Committee of the Labour Party from 1932 to 1933.

Parliament of the United Kingdom
Preceded by John Hodge	Member of Parliament for Manchester Gorton; 1923 – 1931	Succeeded by Eric Bailey
Preceded by Eric Bailey	Member of Parliament for Manchester Gorton; 1935 – 1937	Succeeded by William Wedgwood Benn
Party political offices
Preceded by George Lathan	Chair of the Labour Party; 1932–1933	Succeeded by Walter R. Smith
