= William Oldfield (British politician) =

British member of Parliament (MP) and trade unionist

William Henry Oldfield (1881 in Sowerby Bridge – 1961) was a British Labour member of Parliament (MP) and a trade unionist.

A cotton operative himself, Oldfield served as Secretary of the Cotton Trades and Labour Council and President of the Cotton Spinners' Association. He was a Manchester City Councillor 1928-1945 and Alderman 1945–61.

The Labour Agent for Gorton, he was selected to fight the Manchester constituency in a wartime by-election in 1942, following the elevation of William Wedgwood Benn to the peerage. He was elected unopposed and held the seat until 1955.

== Notes ==
Parliament of the United Kingdom
Preceded by William Wedgwood Benn	Member of Parliament for Manchester Gorton; 1942 – 1955	Succeeded by Konni Zilliacus
