= 1889 Gorton by-election =

UK parliamentary by-election

The 1889 Gorton by-election was a parliamentary by-election held on 22 March 1889 for the British House of Commons in the Gorton Division of Lancashire.

== Vacancy ==
The seat had become vacant on the death of the sitting Liberal MP Richard Peacock on 3 March 1889. Peacock had held the seat since the 1885 general election.

== Candidates ==
The Liberal Party selected William Mather a 50-year-old industrialist, the head of an engineering firm in Salford and the former MP for Salford South.

The Conservatives, who were backed by their Liberal Unionist allies, selected Ernest Hatch. Hatch was aged 29, a wine merchant from London but had been active in the Gorton constituency for his party since June 1888.

== Issues ==
The principal issue of the by-election was Irish home rule. Indeed, Mather declared it was the only question to be settled in the contest and hoped that the electors would not be influenced by any side issues. The Irish and Roman Catholic communities in the area had their own political organisations. While they were solidly behind the Liberal Party, they valued their independence and campaigned separately. During the by-election, they set up their own election committee on behalf of Mather and canvassed in their own end of the constituency. Even the local priests were out campaigning for him. For his part, Hatch stated the Irish had no cause for grievance and strongly defended the Irish policies of the government of Lord Salisbury.

Despite Mather’s plea, it was not possible for all other political questions to be excluded from the campaign. Trade, foreign affairs and the naval building programme also intruded as did the issue of temperance with the main temperance organisations supporting Mather and the brewers backing Hatch.

== Result ==
Mather held the seat for the Liberals with a slightly increased majority of 846 as opposed to Peacock’s 457 at the 1886 general election. This may nevertheless have been something of a disappointment. In the course of the Parliament so far the Liberals had gained nine seats from the Conservatives or Liberal Unionists and one from the Irish Parliamentary Party. They had lost only one seat to the Liberal Unionists (at Doncaster by a very narrow margin). It was reported that the Liberals had been confident of a much larger majority for Mather and that as the numbers of Irish electors in the division was about 1100, without that sectional support the seat might well have been lost.

Mather went on to hold the seat at the 1892 general election with a reduced majority of 222. At this election the Liberals came back to government under Mr Gladstone. Perhaps Mather's disappointing majority at the by-election had been something of a portent however. His own majority was down and nationally the party, which had expected to win an outright majority in the House of Commons, was in effect a minority government governing with the support and consent of the Irish MPs.

22 March 1889 by-election: Gorton
| Party | Candidate | Votes | % | ±% |
|---|---|---|---|---|
| Liberal | William Mather | 5,155 | 54.5 | +1.9 |
| Conservative | Ernest Hatch | 4,309 | 45.5 | −1.9 |
| Majority | | 846 | 9.0 | +3.8 |
| Turnout | | 9,464 | 88.7 | +4.3 |
| Liberal hold | | Swing | +1.9 | |
