= 1937 Manchester Gorton by-election =

UK Parliamentary by-election

← 1935	18 February 1937	1945 →

Constituency of Manchester Gorton
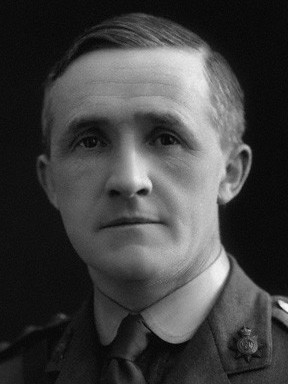
	First party	Second party
		Con
Candidate	William Wedgwood Benn	A. Spearman
Party	Labour	Conservative
Popular vote	17,849	13,091
Percentage	57.7%	42.3%
MP before election
Joseph Compton
Labour
Elected MP
William Wedgwood Benn
Labour

The 1937 Manchester Gorton by-election was held on 18 February 1937. The by-election was held due to the death of the incumbent Labour MP, Joseph Compton. It was won by the Labour candidate William Wedgwood Benn.

By Election 20 February 1937: Manchester, Gorton
Party	Candidate	Votes	%	±%
Labour	William Wedgwood Benn	17,849	57.7	
Conservative	A Spearman	13,091	42.3	
Majority		4,758	15.4	
Turnout		30,940		
Labour hold		Swing		
