= 1942 Manchester Gorton by-election =

UK Parliamentary by-election

The 1942 Manchester Gorton by-election was held on 11 March 1942. The by-election was held due to the elevation to the peerage of the incumbent Labour MP, William Wedgwood Benn. It was won by the Labour candidate William Oldfield.
