= Bromley (electoral division) =

Electoral division in Greater London, 1965–1973

- Former electoral division for the Greater London Council
- Bromley electoral division boundaries from 1969 to 1973
- District: London Borough of Bromley
- Population: 303,550 (1969 estimate)
- Electorate: 204,108 (1964); 207,083 (1967); 212,557 (1968); 226,553 (1970)
- Area: 37,509.0 acres (151.794 km^{2})

Former electoral division
- Created: 1965
- Abolished: 1973
- Member(s): 4
- Replaced by: Beckenham, Chislehurst, Orpington and Ravensbourne

Bromley was an electoral division for the purposes of elections to the Greater London Council. The constituency elected four councillors for a three-year term in 1964, 1967 and 1970.

== History ==
It was planned to use the same boundaries as the Westminster Parliament constituencies for election of councillors to the Greater London Council (GLC), as had been the practice for elections to the predecessor London County Council, but those that existed in 1965 crossed the Greater London boundary. Until new constituencies could be settled, the 32 London boroughs were used as electoral areas which therefore created a constituency called Bromley.

The boundaries of the electoral division were adjusted on 1 April 1969.

The electoral division was replaced from 1973 by the single-member electoral divisions of Beckenham, Chislehurst, Orpington and Ravensbourne.

== Elections ==
The Bromley constituency was used for the Greater London Council elections in 1964, 1967 and 1970. Four councillors were elected at each election using first-past-the-post voting.

=== 1964 election ===
The first election was held on 9 April 1964, a year before the council came into its powers. The electorate was 204,108 and four Conservative Party councillors were elected. With 111,296 people voting, the turnout was 54.5%. The councillors were elected for a three-year term.

1964 Greater London Council election: Bromley
Party	Candidate	Votes	%	±%
Conservative	Mrs. Edith Gordon Beecher-Bryant	55,168		
Conservative	Victor Sidney Henry Mitchell	54,220		
Conservative	Mrs. Benita Dorothy Barham	53,584		
Conservative	Robert Joseph Turner	53,218		
Labour	C. J. Christopher	27,325		
Labour	F. F. W. Coates	27,270		
Liberal	M. A. Minter	26,603		
Liberal	A. B. Howard	26,498		
Liberal	N. D. M. McGeorge	25,800		
Labour	Mrs. L. M. Moelwyn-Hughes	25,223		
Labour	Miss G. H. Warrack	24,457		
Liberal	L. D. Ricketts	23,998		
Communist	C. L. Coleman	4,295		
Turnout				
Conservative win (new seat)				
Conservative win (new seat)				
Conservative win (new seat)				
Conservative win (new seat)				

=== 1967 election ===
The second election was held on 13 April 1967. The electorate was 207,083 and four Conservative Party councillors were elected. With 107,769 people voting, the turnout was 52.0%. The councillors were elected for a three-year term.

1967 Greater London Council election: Bromley
Party	Candidate	Votes	%	±%
Conservative	Mrs. Benita Dorothy Barham	61,613		
Conservative	Mrs. Edith Gordon Beecher-Bryant	61,093		
Conservative	Frank Willie Smith	60,027		
Conservative	Robert Joseph Turner	60,017		
Liberal	E. C. H. Jones	26,755		
Liberal	P. McNally	26,659		
Liberal	Mrs. J. I. Alexander	26,453		
Liberal	M. A. Minter	26,236		
Labour	C. J. Christopher	16,463		
Labour	S. W. Mayne	16,438		
Labour	G. N. Etherington	16,027		
Labour	G. A, Griffiths	15,652		
Communist	C. L. Coleman	2,508		
New Freedom	Frank Hansford-Miller	1,580		
Turnout				
Conservative hold		Swing		
Conservative hold		Swing		
Conservative hold		Swing		
Conservative hold		Swing		

=== 1968 by-election ===
A by-election was held on 7 November 1968, following the death of Robert Turner. The electorate was 212,557 and one Conservative Party councillor was elected. With 44,177 voting, the turnout was 20.9%

Bromley by-election, 1968
Party	Candidate	Votes	%	±%
Conservative	David A. Harris	28,695		
Liberal	P. A. Golding	10,199		
Labour	S. W. Mayne	5,283		
Turnout				
Conservative hold		Swing		

=== 1970 election ===
The third election was held on 9 April 1970. The electorate was 226,553 and four Conservative Party councillors were elected. With 89,985 people voting, the turnout was 39.7%. The councillors were elected for a three-year term.

1970 Greater London Council election: Bromley
Party	Candidate	Votes	%	±%
Conservative	David Harris	54,800		
Conservative	Frank Willie Smith	54,301		
Conservative	Charles Henry Ernst Pratt	54,237		
Conservative	Roland Charles Beecher-Bryant	51,194		
Labour	I. G. Bing	18,494		
Labour	A. P. Chambers	17,932		
Labour	D. I. Grant	17,900		
Labour	John Spellar	16,400		
Liberal	P. McNally	14,979		
Liberal	W. Huckin	14,818		
Liberal	A. V. Luff	14,357		
Liberal	Mrs. D. E. Richmond	14,129		
Communist	Mrs. M. B. Burkin	1,551		
Homes before Roads	R. H. Mason	1,421		
Homes before Roads	A. V. J. Day	1,280		
Homes before Roads	R. Day	1,025		
Homes before Roads	I. V. Dodd	1,011		
New Freedom	Frank Hansford-Miller	552		
Union Movement	J. P. Sibley	426		
Turnout				
Conservative hold		Swing		
Conservative hold		Swing		
Conservative hold		Swing		
Conservative hold		Swing		
