= 1976 Thurrock by-election =

UK parliamentary by-election

The 1976 Thurrock by-election of 15 July 1976 was held after the death of Labour Member of Parliament (MP) Hugh Delargy. Labour held on to the seat in the by-election

== Result ==
Thurrock by-Election, 1976
| Party | Candidate | Votes | % | ±% |
|---|---|---|---|---|
| Labour | Oonagh McDonald | 22,191 | 45.27 | −10.30 |
| Conservative | Percy Lomax | 17,352 | 35.39 | +10.95 |
| Liberal | Anthony Charlton | 5,977 | 12.19 | −7.80 |
| National Front | John Roberts | 3,255 | 6.64 | New |
| English National | Frank Hansford-Miller | 187 | 0.38 | New |
| World Grid Sunshine Room Party | Peter Bishop | 72 | 0.15 | New |
| Majority | | 4,839 | 9.88 | −21.24 |
| Turnout | | 49,034 | | |
| Labour hold | | Swing | 10.6 from Labour to Conservative | |

== Outcome ==
Reporting the result of the election, The Glasgow Herald argued that the Labour government had taken "another severe battering from the electorate" with the Labour majority falling by over 14,000 votes since the last general election. It also argued that "Labour voters in London dockland stayed away in droves". However it noted that for Prime Minister James Callaghan the most important thing would be that Oonagh McDonald's victory would "swell the Government's effective majority to three." Margaret Thatcher said the vote was "a massive vote of no confidence in the Government" and looked forward to the next by-election. By contrast the result was argued by The Glasgow Herald to auger "problems" for the Liberal leader David Steel and the newspaper suggested that the Government would be concerned at the size of the National Front's vote in a seat it had not previously fought.
