= Thurrock (constituency) =

Parliamentary constituency in the United Kingdom, 1945 onwards

Coordinates: 51.48°N 0.32°E

- Borough constituency for the House of Commons
- Interactive map of boundaries since 2024
- Location within the East of England
- County: Essex
- Electorate: 73,347 (March 2020)
- Major settlements: Grays, Tilbury, South Ockendon and Chafford

Current constituency
- Created: 1945
- Member of Parliament: Jen Craft (Labour)
- Seats: One
- Created from: South East Essex

Thurrock is a constituency (Note: A county constituency (for the purposes of election expenses and type of returning officer)) represented in the House of Commons of the UK Parliament since 2024 by Jen Craft of the Labour Party. (Note: As with all constituencies, the constituency elects one Member of Parliament (MP) by the first past the post system of election at least every five years.)

== Constituency profile ==
A view overlooking Purfleet (foreground), Grays and Tilbury

Thurrock is a constituency in Essex in the East of England. Towns in the constituency include Grays, Tilbury, Purfleet, Aveley and South Ockendon. It is named after the local government area of Thurrock, of which the constituency covers the western half.

This constituency covers an area of adjacent towns on the north bank of the River Thames, located around 20 miles (32 km) east of central London. Thurrock is heavily industrial; Purfleet has a large industrial estate and freight terminal, and Tilbury contains the Port of Tilbury, London's principal container and cruise ship port handling millions of tonnes of cargo each year. Many residential areas in this constituency, particularly in South Ockendon, were built as council estates to accommodate London residents whose houses were destroyed during World War II. The constituency has average levels of wealth overall; the suburbs of Grays are mostly affluent whilst there are high levels of deprivation in Tilbury and South Ockendon. House prices are generally lower than the rest of the East of England but similar to the UK average.

Thurrock has a low retired population and a large proportion of middle-aged adults with families. Residents have average levels of income, homeownership and child poverty. They generally have low levels of education and a high proportion work in the transport and retail sectors. The percentage claiming unemployment benefits is high. White people made up 71% of the population at the 2021 census, around a fifth of whom were of non-British origin including large Polish and Romanian communities. Black people were 15% of the population and Asians were 9%.

At the local council, most of this constituency is represented by Reform UK with some Conservative and Labour Party councillors elected in the west of Grays. Voters in Thurrock overwhelmingly supported leaving the European Union in the 2016 referendum; an estimated 71% voted in favour of Brexit compared to the UK-wide figure of 52%, making it one of the top 20 most Brexit-supporting constituencies out of 650 nationwide.

== History ==
=== History of boundaries ===
The seat was created from South East Essex as a result of the interim redistribution carried out for the 1945 general election. It remained unchanged until the redistribution following the reorganisation of local authorities under the Local Government Act 1972 (not coming into force until the 1983 general election), when it lost northern parts to the new constituency of Billericay. There was a small change for the 2010 general election, when East Tilbury was included in the new constituency of South Basildon and East Thurrock.

=== History of results ===
Thurrock was for 38 years from its creation in 1945 a large-majority Labour seat in parliamentary elections. The post-Falklands War election in 1983 gave a majority of less than 4% of the vote to a recently split Labour Party (the breakaway faction, the SDP, came third). A Conservative gained Thurrock in 1987 with a small majority. In 1992, it was regained by a Labour candidate, Andrew MacKinlay. During his tenure as MP, MacKinlay was criticised for his questioning technique used on weapons expert Dr. David Kelly.

In the 2010 general election, a Conservative gained the seat, with Jackie Doyle-Price being elected as the MP on a majority of 92 votes, the third most marginal in that election. The 2015 result gave the seat the 8th most marginal majority of the Conservative Party's 331 seats by percentage of majority. In that 2015 election fewer than 1,000 votes separated the top three parties: Conservative, Labour and UKIP. The seat has had bellwether outcome status since 1997.

In 2017, the seat was number 1 on UKIP's 2017 target list, the party only needing a 0.98% swing to win the seat from third place if the previous result were repeated. The constituency was also at number 7 on Labour's target list, with a 0.54% swing needed for their candidate to win the seat. In the event, the swing to Labour was around 0.2% and Doyle-Price held the seat by a mere 345 votes, making it the 26th-closest nationally (of 650 seats). This was also the third consecutive occasion that Thurrock had been held or won very narrowly. At the 2019 general election, The Conservatives were boosted by the Brexit Party having no candidate in the seat, with Doyle-Price's vote share increased by 19.1%, the largest increase in vote share achieved by any Conservative candidate in the United Kingdom at that election, and her majority rose to 11,482 votes.

At the 2024 general election, the seat was gained by Labour's Jen Craft by a comfortable majority of over 17%, with the incumbent Conservative Doyle-Price placing third behind Reform UK.

=== Prominent frontbenchers ===
Dr Oonagh McDonald was Opposition Spokesman on Defence from 1981 to 1983, and then Opposition Spokesman on Treasury and Economic Affairs from 1983 to 1987.

== Boundaries and boundary changes ==
=== Historic ===
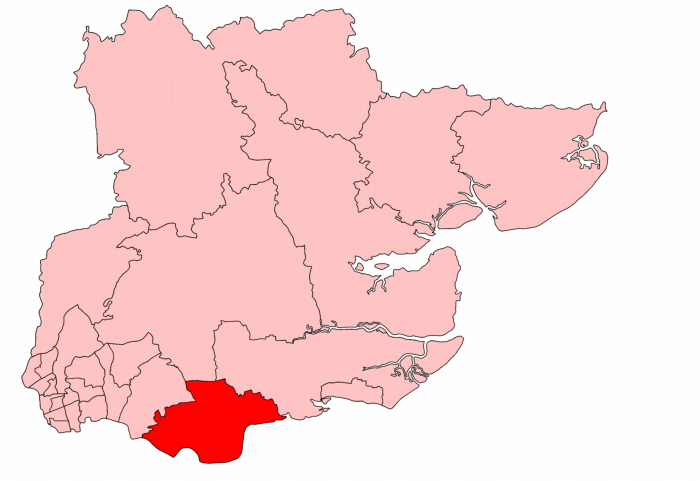
Thurrock in Essex, showing boundaries used from 1945 to 1983

==== 1945–1983 ====
- The Urban District of Thurrock.

The House of Commons (Redistribution of Seats) Act 1944 set up Boundaries Commissions to carry out periodic reviews of the distribution of parliamentary constituencies. It also authorised an initial review to subdivide abnormally large constituencies in time for the 1945 election. This was implemented by the Redistribution of Seats Order 1945 under which South East Essex was divided into two constituencies. As a consequence, the new Thurrock Division of Essex was formed, comprising the Urban District of Thurrock (created largely from amalgamating the Urban Districts of Grays Thurrock and Tilbury and the Rural District of Orsett).

==== 1983–2010 ====
- The Borough of Thurrock wards of Aveley, Belhus, Chadwell St Mary, East Tilbury, Grays Thurrock North, Grays Thurrock Town, Little Thurrock, Ockendon, Stifford, Tilbury, and West Thurrock.

Map of boundaries 2010–2024

Northern areas transferred to the re-established constituency of Billericay.

==== 2010–2024 ====
- The Borough of Thurrock wards of Aveley and Uplands, Belhus, Chadwell St Mary, Chafford and North Stifford, Grays Riverside, Grays Thurrock, Little Thurrock Blackshots, Little Thurrock Rectory, Ockendon, South Chafford, Stifford Clays, Tilbury Riverside and Thurrock Park, Tilbury St Chads, and West Thurrock and South Stifford.

Following a redistribution of local authority wards, East Tilbury was transferred to the new constituency of South Basildon and East Thurrock.

=== Current ===
Further to the 2023 review of Westminster constituencies, which came into effect for the 2024 general election, the composition of the constituency was reduced to meet the electorate size requirements, with the transfer to South Basildon and East Thurrock of the Chadwell St Mary ward (as it existed on 1 December 2020).

Following a local government boundary review which came into effect in May 2026, the constituency now comprises the following wards of the Borough of Thurrock:

- Aveley; Belhus; Chafford Hundred East; Chafford Hundred West; Grays Riverside; Grays Town; Little Thurrock Blackshots; Little Thurrock Rectory; Ockendon; Purfleet-on-Thames; Stifford; Tilbury Riverside; Tilbury St Chads; West Thurrock and South Stifford.

== Members of Parliament ==
South East Essex prior to 1945

Election	Member	Party
1945	Leslie Solley	Labour
1949	Leslie Solley	Labour Independent Group
1950	Hugh Delargy	Labour
1976 by-election	Oonagh McDonald	Labour
1987	Tim Janman	Conservative
1992	Andrew MacKinlay	Labour
2010	Jackie Doyle-Price	Conservative
2024	Jen Craft	Labour

== Elections ==
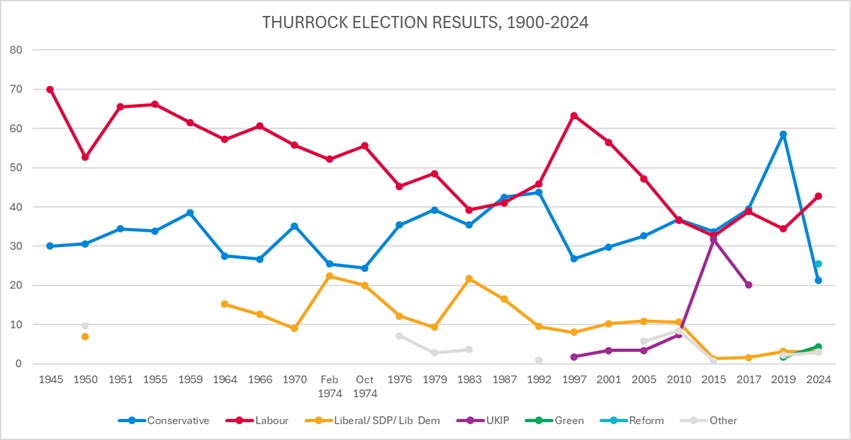
Election results 1945-2024

=== Elections in the 2020s ===
General election 2024: Thurrock
Party	Candidate	Votes	%	±%
Labour	Jen Craft	16,050	42.7	+9.8
Reform	Sophie Preston-Hall	9,576	25.5	N/A
Conservative	Jackie Doyle-Price	8,009	21.3	−38.6
Green	Eugene McCarthy	1,632	4.4	+2.6
Liberal Democrats	Michael Bukola	1,157	3.1	±0.0
Workers Party	Yousaff Khan	691	1.8	N/A
Independent	Raj Nimal	443	1.2	N/A
Majority		6,474	17.2	N/A
Turnout		37,558	51.2	−8.7
Labour gain from Conservative		Swing		

=== Elections in the 2010s ===
General election 2019: Thurrock
Party	Candidate	Votes	%	±%
Conservative	Jackie Doyle-Price	27,795	58.6	+19.1
Labour	John Kent	16,313	34.4	−4.4
Liberal Democrats	Stewart Stone	1,510	3.2	+1.6
Independent	James Woollard	1,042	2.2	N/A
Green	Ben Harvey	807	1.7	N/A
Majority		11,482	24.2	+23.5
Turnout		47,467	59.6	−4.8
Registered electors		79,655		
Conservative hold		Swing	+11.8	

General election 2017: Thurrock
Party	Candidate	Votes	%	±%
Conservative	Jackie Doyle-Price	19,880	39.5	+5.8
Labour	John Kent	19,535	38.8	+6.2
UKIP	Tim Aker	10,112	20.1	−11.6
Liberal Democrats	Kevin McNamara	798	1.6	+0.3
Majority		345	0.7	−0.4
Turnout		50,325	64.4	+0.5
Conservative hold		Swing	−0.2	

General election 2015: Thurrock
Party	Candidate	Votes	%	±%
Conservative	Jackie Doyle-Price	16,692	33.7	−3.1
Labour	Polly Billington	16,156	32.6	−4.0
UKIP	Tim Aker	15,718	31.7	+24.3
Liberal Democrats	Rhodri Jamieson-Ball	644	1.3	−9.4
CISTA	Jamie Barnes	244	0.5	N/A
Independent	Daniel Munyambu	79	0.2	N/A
All People's Party	Aba Kristilolu	31	0.1	N/A
Majority		536	1.1	+0.9
Turnout		49,564	63.9	+4.8
Conservative hold		Swing	+0.4	

General election 2010: Thurrock
Party	Candidate	Votes	%	±%
Conservative	Jackie Doyle-Price	16,869	36.8	+3.6
Labour	Carl Morris	16,777	36.6	−9.6
Liberal Democrats	Carys Davis	4,901	10.7	−0.4
BNP	Emma Colgate	3,618	7.9	+2.1
UKIP	Clive Broad	3,390	7.4	+4.0
CPA	Arinola Araba	267	0.6	N/A
Majority		92	0.2	N/A
Turnout		45,822	59.1	+4.2
Conservative gain from Labour		Swing	+6.6	

=== Elections in the 2000s ===
General election 2005: Thurrock
Party	Candidate	Votes	%	±%
Labour	Andrew MacKinlay	20,636	47.2	−9.3
Conservative	Garry Hague	14,261	32.6	+2.8
Liberal Democrats	Earnshaw Palmer	4,770	10.9	+0.6
BNP	Nick Geri	2,526	5.8	N/A
UKIP	Carol Jackson	1,499	3.4	0.0
Majority		6,375	14.6	−11.9
Turnout		43,692	54.9	+5.9
Labour hold		Swing	−6.1	

General election 2001: Thurrock
Party	Candidate	Votes	%	±%
Labour	Andrew MacKinlay	21,121	56.5	−6.8
Conservative	Mike Penning	11,124	29.8	+3.0
Liberal Democrats	John Lathan	3,846	10.3	+2.2
UKIP	Christopher Sheppard	1,271	3.4	+1.6
Majority		9,997	26.7	−9.8
Turnout		37,362	49.0	−16.6
Labour hold		Swing		

=== Elections in the 1990s ===
General election 1997: Thurrock
Party	Candidate	Votes	%	±%
Labour	Andrew MacKinlay	29,896	63.3	+17.4
Conservative	Andrew Rosindell	12,640	26.8	−16.9
Liberal Democrats	Joe White	3,843	8.1	−1.4
UKIP	Peter Compobassi	833	1.8	N/A
Majority		17,256	36.5	+34.3
Turnout		47,212	65.6	−12.5
Labour hold		Swing	+17.2	

General election 1992: Thurrock
Party	Candidate	Votes	%	±%
Labour	Andrew MacKinlay	24,791	45.9	+4.9
Conservative	Tim Janman	23,619	43.7	+1.2
Liberal Democrats	Alan J. Banton	5,145	9.5	−7.0
Pensioners' Party	Charles Rogers	391	0.7	N/A
Anti-Federalist League	Peter Compobassi	117	0.2	N/A
Majority		1,172	2.2	N/A
Turnout		54,063	78.1	+6.6
Labour gain from Conservative		Swing	+1.8	

=== Elections in the 1980s ===
General election 1987: Thurrock
Party	Candidate	Votes	%	±%
Conservative	Tim Janman	20,527	42.5	+7.1
Labour	Oonagh McDonald	19,837	41.0	+1.8
SDP	Donald Benson	7,970	16.5	−5.2
Majority		690	1.5	N/A
Turnout		48,334	71.5	+3.8
Conservative gain from Labour		Swing		

General election 1983: Thurrock
Party	Candidate	Votes	%	±%
Labour	Oonagh McDonald	17,600	39.2	−9.3
Conservative	Julie Tallon	15,878	35.4	−3.8
SDP	Donald Benson	9,761	21.7	N/A
Independent	M Bibby	1,200	2.7	N/A
BNP	R Sinclair	252	0.6	N/A
Communist	J Paul	199	0.4	N/A
Majority		1,722	3.8	−5.5
Turnout		44,891	67.7	−7.4
Labour hold		Swing	-3.2	

=== Elections in the 1970s ===
General election 1979: Thurrock
Party	Candidate	Votes	%	±%
Labour	Oonagh McDonald	33,449	48.55	− 7.02
Conservative	Tony Baldry	27,030	39.24	+14.80
Liberal	M Crowson	6,445	9.36	−2.83
National Front	E Burdett	1,358	1.97	−4.67
Independent	B Chattaway	365	0.53	N/A
Workers Revolutionary	M Daly	242	0.35	N/A
Majority		6,419	9.31	
Turnout		68,884	75.11	
Labour hold		Swing		

1976 by-election: Thurrock
Party	Candidate	Votes	%	±%
Labour	Oonagh McDonald	22,191	45.27	−10.30
Conservative	Percy Lomax	17,352	35.39	+10.95
Liberal	Anthony Charlton	5,977	12.19	−7.80
National Front	John Roberts	3,255	6.64	N/A
English National	Frank Hansford-Miller	187	0.38	N/A
World Grid Sunshine Room Party	Peter Bishop	72	0.15	N/A
Majority		4,839	9.88	−21.24
Turnout		49,034		
Labour hold		Swing	-10.6	

General election October 1974: Thurrock
Party	Candidate	Votes	%	±%
Labour	Hugh Delargy	34,066	55.57	=3.42
Conservative	P Lomax	14,986	24.44	−1.04
Liberal	A Charlton	12,255	19.99	−2.38
Majority		19,080	31.13	
Turnout		61,307	68.54	
Labour hold		Swing		

General election February 1974: Thurrock
Party	Candidate	Votes	%	±%
Labour	Hugh Delargy	36,217	52.15	−3.60
Conservative	Graham Bright	17,699	25.48	− 9.70
Liberal	Kaye Fleetwood	15,534	22.37	+13/3
Majority		18,518	26.67	
Turnout		69,450	78.41	
Labour hold		Swing		

General election 1970: Thurrock Electorate 84,337
Party	Candidate	Votes	%	±%
Labour	Hugh Delargy	30,874	55.75	
Conservative	Graham Bright	19,486	35.18	
Liberal	Kaye Fleetwood	5,024	9.07	
Majority		11,388	20.57	
Turnout		55,384	65.67	
Labour hold		Swing		

=== Elections in the 1960s ===
General election 1966: Thurrock Electorate 72,502
Party	Candidate	Votes	%	±%
Labour	Hugh Delargy	31,998	60.67	
Conservative	Cedric J Hodgson	14,094	26.72	
Liberal	James C Moran	6,648	12.61	
Majority		17,904	33.95	
Turnout		52,740	72.74	
Labour hold		Swing		

General election 1964: Thurrock Electorate 71,519
Party	Candidate	Votes	%	±%
Labour	Hugh Delargy	30,372	57.22	
Conservative	Robert McCrindle	14,615	27.53	
Liberal	A Noel H Blackburn	8,094	15.25	N/A
Majority		15,757	29.69	
Turnout		53,081	74.22	
Labour hold		Swing		

=== Elections in the 1950s ===
General election 1959: Thurrock Electorate 67,054
Party	Candidate	Votes	%	±%
Labour	Hugh Delargy	32,270	61.52	
Conservative	William E McNamara	20,188	38.48	
Majority		12,082	23.04	
Turnout		52,458	78.23	
Labour hold		Swing		

General election 1955: Thurrock Electorate 63,030
Party	Candidate	Votes	%	±%
Labour	Hugh Delargy	31,375	66.16	
Conservative	Gerald A Petty	16,046	33.84	
Majority		15,329	32.32	
Turnout		47,421	75.24	
Labour hold		Swing		

General election 1951: Thurrock Electorate 53,157
Party	Candidate	Votes	%	±%
Labour	Hugh Delargy	28,851	65.55	
Conservative	Godfrey Lagden	15,166	34.45	
Majority		13,685	31.10	
Turnout		44,017	82.81	
Labour hold		Swing		

General election 1950: Thurrock Electorate 50,962
Party	Candidate	Votes	%	±%
Labour	Hugh Delargy	22,893	52.68	
Conservative	Airey Neave	13,306	30.62	
Labour Independent Group	Leslie Solley	4,250	9.78	N/A
Liberal	William Harold Henry Siddons	3,010	6.93	N/A
Majority		9,587	22.06	
Turnout		43,459	85.28	
Labour hold		Swing		

=== Election in the 1940s ===
General election 1945: Thurrock
Party	Candidate	Votes	%
Labour	Leslie Solley	23,171	70.0
Conservative	Thomas Adam	9,909	30.0
Majority		13,262	40.0
Turnout		33,080	76.9
Labour win (new seat)			

== See also ==
- List of parliamentary constituencies in Essex
- List of parliamentary constituencies in the East of England (region)
