= Ravensbourne (electoral division) =

Electoral division in Greater London, 1973–1986

- Former electoral division for the Greater London Council
- District: Bromley
- Electorate: 48,698 (1973); 47,849 (1977); 47,574 (1981)
- Major settlements: Hayes
- Area: 2,537 hectares (25.37 km^{2}) (1973); 2,564 hectares (25.64 km^{2}) (1977/1981)

Former electoral division
- Created: 1973
- Abolished: 1986
- Member: 1
- Created from: Bromley

Ravensbourne was an electoral division for the purposes of elections to the Greater London Council. The constituency elected one councillor for a four-year term in 1973, 1977 and 1981, with the final term extended for an extra year ahead of the abolition of the Greater London Council.

== History ==
It was planned to use the same boundaries as the Westminster Parliament constituencies for election of councillors to the Greater London Council (GLC), as had been the practice for elections to the predecessor London County Council, but those that existed in 1965 crossed the Greater London boundary. Until new constituencies could be settled, the 32 London boroughs were used as electoral areas. The London Borough of Bromley formed the Bromley electoral division. This was used for the Greater London Council elections in 1964, 1967 and 1970.

The new constituencies were settled following the Second Periodic Review of Westminster constituencies and the new electoral division matched the boundaries of the Ravensbourne parliamentary constituency.

It covered an area of 2,537 hectares (25.37 km^{2}) in 1973. Revisions to ward boundaries in the London Borough of Bromley changed the area of the division to 2,564 hectares (25.64 km^{2}) for the 1977 and 1981 elections.

== Elections ==
The Ravensbourne constituency was used for the Greater London Council elections in 1973, 1977 and 1981. One councillor was elected at each election using first-past-the-post voting. David Harris, who won the seat at the 1973 and election, had also been elected to the predecessor Bromley electoral division in 1968 at a by-election and in 1970.

=== 1973 election ===
The fourth election to the GLC (and first using revised boundaries) was held on 12 April 1973. The electorate was 48,698 and one Conservative Party councillor was elected. The turnout was 36.7%. The councillor was elected for a three-year term. This was extended for an extra year in 1976 when the electoral cycle was switched to four-yearly.

1973 Greater London Council election: Ravensbourne
Party	Candidate	Votes	%	±%
Conservative	David Anthony Harris	10,012	56.01	
Liberal	M. M. Coulson	4,124	23.08	
Labour	A. W. Wright	3,534	19.77	
Communist	G. Felton	202	1.13	
Turnout				
Conservative win (new seat)				

=== 1977 election ===
The fifth election to the GLC (and second using revised boundaries) was held on 5 May 1977. The electorate was 47,849 and one Conservative Party councillor was elected. The turnout was 43.5%. The councillor was elected for a four-year term.

1977 Greater London Council election: Ravensbourne
Party	Candidate	Votes	%	±%
Conservative	M. J. Wheeler	14,510	69.74	
Labour	J. R. Holbrook	3,528	16.95	
Liberal	R. L. Coverson	1,866	8.97	
National Front	G. V. Askew	648	3.11	
GLC Abolitionist Campaign	D. J. Murray	180	0.87	
English National	F. E. Saffery	73	0.35	
Turnout				
Conservative hold		Swing		

=== 1981 election ===
The sixth and final election to the GLC (and third using revised boundaries) was held on 7 May 1981. The electorate was 47,5741 and one Conservative Party councillor was elected. The turnout was 44.0%. The councillor was elected for a four-year term, extended by an extra year by the Local Government (Interim Provisions) Act 1984, ahead of the abolition of the council.

1981 Greater London Council election: Ravensbourne
Party	Candidate	Votes	%	±%
Conservative	M. J. Wheeler	12,099	57.83	
Labour	J. R. Holbrook	4,187	20.01	
Liberal	R.L. Coverson	3,760	17.97	
Ecology	P. J. Greenwood	595	2.84	
NNF	B. Smoker	175	0.84	
Abolition of Rates	Frank H. Hansford-Miller	102	0.49	
Turnout				
Conservative hold		Swing		
