= Andrew MacKinlay =

British politician

Member of Parliament for Thurrock
- In office 9 April 1992 – 12 April 2010
- Preceded by: Tim Janman
- Succeeded by: Jackie Doyle-Price

Personal details
- Born: 24 April 1949 (age 77) London, England
- Party: Labour (1966–2018); Liberal Democrats (2019–present)
- Spouse: Ruth Segar
- Children: 3

Andrew Stuart MacKinlay (born 24 April 1949) is a British Liberal Democrat politician, who was the Labour Member of Parliament (MP) for Thurrock from 1992 until he stepped down at the 2010 general election.

In 2021 he was elected as a Liberal Democrat councillor for Kingston upon Thames London Borough Council, although he stood down a short time later, at the 2022 election.

== Early life and career ==
MacKinlay was born in Wembley on 24 April 1949. He was educated successively at St Joseph's School, Wembley; Our Lady Immaculate Primary School, Tolworth; Salesian College (a private Catholic school at the time), now comprehensive Salesian School in Chertsey and Kingston College, now part of the South Thames College Group. He worked from 1965 as a committee clerk with Surrey County Council until 1975, when he served as a union official with the National and Local Government Officers' Association (NALGO). He joined NALGO in 1965. He joined the Labour Party in 1966. MacKinlay was elected as a Labour councillor in 1971 in the Royal Borough of Kingston upon Thames and served for two terms as one of two councillors for the ward of Tolworth West until 1978. He unsuccessfully vied for his local seat of Surbiton in both of the 1974 general elections, keeping his deposit in what was then demonstrably a three-party contest. He also contested London South and Surrey East at the 1984 European Parliament elections.

== Parliamentary career ==
Following unsuccessful election campaigns in the safe Conservative seats of Croydon Central in 1983 and Peterborough in 1987, MacKinlay regained the historically safe Labour seat of Thurrock in 1992 from the Conservatives.

On 15 June 1992, he tabled an Early day motion, seeking a pardon for soldiers executed in the First World War. This campaign eventually succeeded with the Armed Forces Act 2006, where section 359 pardoned 306 British Empire soldiers.

In 1998 MacKinlay was the first to introduce a freedom of information bill to the House of Commons.

Although MacKinlay had originally come from the right of the Labour Party, as an MP he came to be associated with the Labour left as a leader of a group of left-wing Labour MPs nicknamed the "awkward squad," known for rebelling against the New Labour leadership of Tony Blair. MacKinlay maintained that he had not moved toward the left, but that the leadership of the Labour Party under Blair had moved to the political right. He continued to rebel against his party under the New Labour leadership of Gordon Brown; by 2008, he had broken the party whip 72 times.

In 2003, MacKinlay described Dr David Kelly as "chaff" during Dr Kelly's appearance before the House of Commons Foreign Affairs Committee. The committee was investigating issues around the British government's dossier on weapons of mass destruction in Iraq. MacKinlay's question was:

I reckon you are chaff; you have been thrown up to divert our probing. Have you ever felt like a fall-guy? You have been set up, have you not?

MacKinlay apparently meant "chaff" as in the radar countermeasure rather than something of little value. It emerged during Kelly's subsequent inquest, however, that Kelly had been deeply upset by his treatment before the committee and had privately described an MP, assumed to be MacKinlay, as an "utter bastard". MacKinlay reportedly apologised to Kelly's widow for the remark.

According to one report, in May 2007, MacKinlay made the nomination that resulted in Gordon Brown having enough nominations to be certain of not facing a contest over the leadership of the party. However, another report states that the decisive nomination was made by Tony Wright with MacKinlay yet to nominate at that point.

=== Notice of resignation ===
On 24 July 2009, he announced that he would not stand at the next General Election due to disillusionment with the way he felt other MPs had caved in to party pressure rather than standing up for their beliefs. He said that the final straw was the failure of a number of Labour MPs who had expressed support for Gary McKinnon, awaiting extradition to the US on computer hacking charges, to vote for a review of the extradition treaty.

=== Damages win ===
On 1 October 2009, MacKinlay accepted a public apology and libel damages from the BBC over allegations made on BBC Two's Newsnight programme that he proposed an amendment to a British government motion on expenses of MPs so he would benefit financially.

=== Ireland and the Commonwealth ===
MacKinlay argued that initiatives should be taken to encourage Ireland to participate in the Commonwealth. He brought forward a motion on the issue in the House of Commons. Ireland had participated in the Commonwealth in the 1930s and 40s. Mackinlay's view was that historians were wrong to say that Ireland had left the Commonwealth in 1949. This was, he said, because the Commonwealth, to the extent that it existed, was nothing like the Commonwealth of today. He felt that the London Declaration formula that permitted republics to participate in the Commonwealth had not been offered to Ireland as an option, though he felt it was not too late to do so. He argued that Ireland should be formally invited to join and that the Commonwealth was its "natural place".

== Personal life ==
MacKinlay lives in Malden Rushett, Surrey, with his wife. He is a keen researcher on World War I history, travelling, and is an honorary patron of Tilbury Football Club. He and his wife, Ruth (née Segar), have three children. While an MP, he employed his wife as his personal assistant. He was once a member of the editorial board of Total Politics, a political magazine, of which his daughter, Sarah, was editor until August 2009.

He was given the Freedom of Gibraltar in 2010.

== Political views ==
In December 2018, he allowed his Labour Party membership to lapse and, in May 2019, he joined the Liberal Democrats. In the Chessington South by-election to Kingston upon Thames London Borough Council held on 6 May 2021, he was elected for the Liberal Democrats. He stood down at the 2022 election.

MacKinlay publicly supports the abolition of the monarchy and is identified as a republican.

Parliament of the United Kingdom
Preceded by Tim Janman	Member of Parliament for Thurrock; 1992–2010	Succeeded by Jackie Doyle-Price
