= Larsmo =

Larsmo Larsmo – Luoto
- Municipality
- Larsmo kommun Luodon kunta
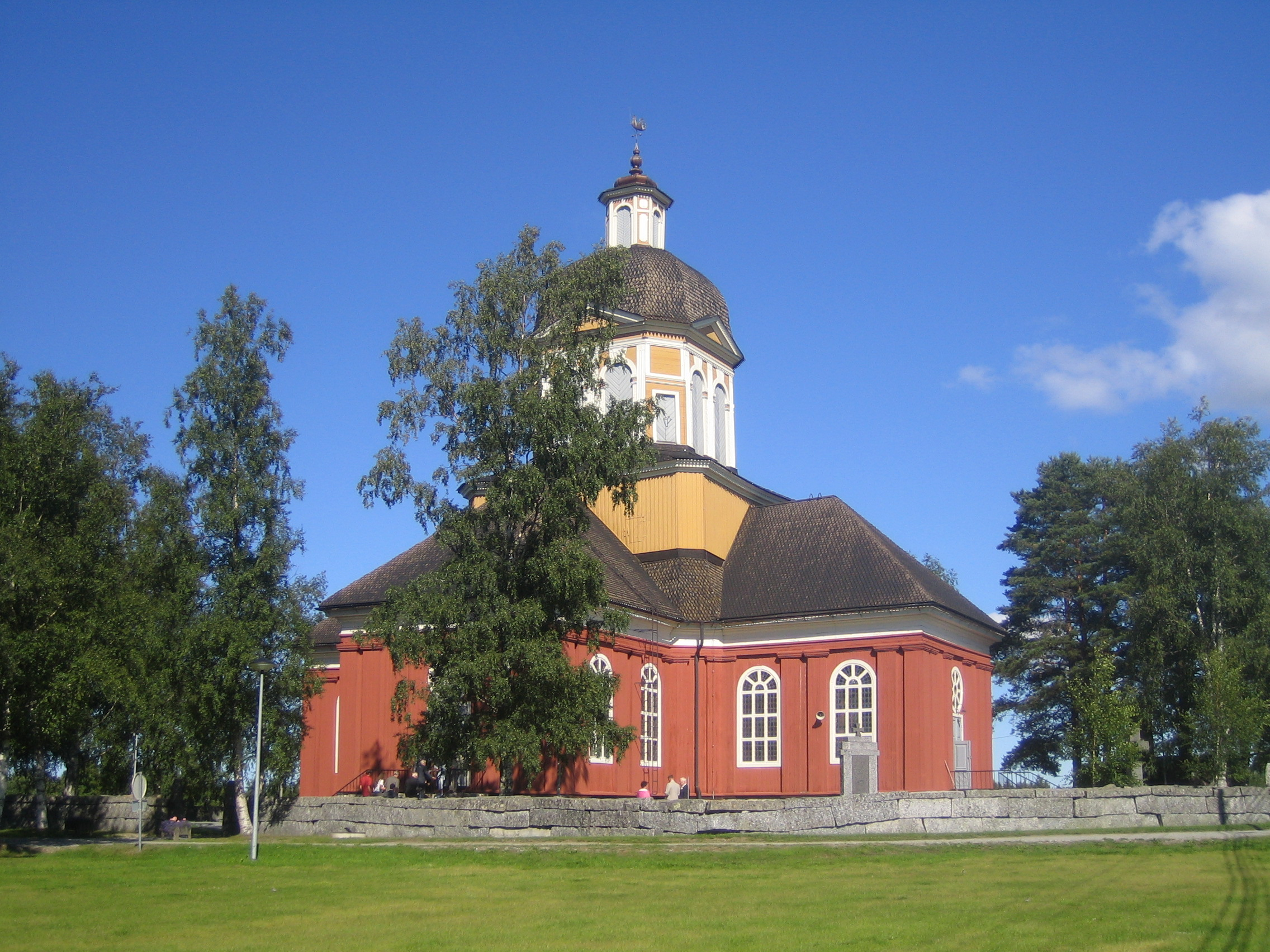
- Larsmo Church

- Coat of arms

- Location of Larsmo in Finland
- Interactive map of Larsmo
- Coordinates: 63°45′N 022°45′E
- Country: Finland
- Region: Ostrobothnia
- Sub-region: Jakobstad
- Charter: 1867

Government
  - Municipal manager: Gun Kapténs

Area (2018-01-01)
  - Total: 853.28 km^{2} (329.45 sq mi)
  - Land: 142.74 km^{2} (55.11 sq mi)
  - Water: 711.07 km^{2} (274.55 sq mi)
  - Rank: 283rd largest in Finland

Population (2025-12-31)
  - Total: 5,955
  - Rank: 155th largest in Finland
  - Density: 41.72/km^{2} (108.1/sq mi)

Population by native language
  - Swedish: 91.6% (official)
  - Finnish: 4.9% (official)
  - Others: 3.5%

Population by age
  - 0 to 14: 29.4%
  - 15 to 64: 56%
  - 65 or older: 14.7%
- Time zone: UTC+02:00 (EET)
  - Summer (DST): UTC+03:00 (EEST)
- Website: larsmo.fi/en/

Larsmo (Finnish: Luoto, Finnish: [ˈluo̯to]) is a municipality in Finland, located on the west coast of the country. Larsmo is situated in Ostrobothnia, along the Gulf of Bothnia. The population of Larsmo is approximately 6,000, while the sub-region has a population of approximately 51,000. It is the 155th most populous municipality in Finland.

Larsmo consists of an archipelago of about 360 islands and numerous skerries. The length of the coastline is about 500 kilometres (310 mi). Lake Larsmo (Larsmosjön), which is Finland's largest artificial fresh water lake, is also located in the municipality. Larsmo covers an area of 853.28 square kilometres (329.45 sq mi) of which 711.07 km^{2} (274.55 sq mi) is water. The population density is 41.72 inhabitants per square kilometre (108.1/sq mi).

Larsmo is a bilingual municipality with Finnish and Swedish as its official languages. The population consists of 5% Finnish speakers, 92% Swedish speakers, and 4% speakers of other languages. Prior to 2014, Swedish was the sole official language of Larsmo.

Larsmo is also the name of one of the villages in the municipality of Larsmo.

== History ==
The land which was to become Larsmo rose from the sea some 2,000 years ago, due to post-glacial rebound. Today the municipality consists of more than 360 islands.

The name Larsmo was first recorded around 1375 as Lamershamby and later Larismo (1544), Larsmoo, Larsmo (1546), and Larismo by (1548).

The administrative municipality Larsmo was founded in 1867, having previously belonged to the parish of Pedersöre. Hunting, fishing and agriculture used to be important sources of income. However, industry and service have now taken over since the changes of agriculture nowadays require larger farms to be profitable. The businesses are mainly influenced by the strong traditions of crafting or boat building.

=== Finnish independence movement ===
The municipality came to play an interesting role in the Finnish independence-movement. During the dark autumn night of December 6, 1905, the steamer SS John Grafton sailed into the Larsmo archipelago with its cargo of weapons, meant to be used for the independence movement in Finland and the revolutionary attempts in Russia. The cargo was unloaded and transported away with the help of the local population. However, the ship ran aground when the ship was heading out to sea. The crew decided to blow up the ship before the Russian guards would find it. The crew fled to Sweden with some smaller sailing vessels and the ship was blown up on December 8. The news soon spread around the world and was mentioned in a number of newspapers. This incident is often counted as the first attempt for a free Finland and to obtain independence from Russia. There is a monument on Orrskär. SS Equity, another ship, loaded with weapons, also unloaded its cargo in the Larsmo archipelago, and a memorial plate is now in place at the Tolvmangrundet island.

=== Emigration ===
Emigrants from Larsmo founded the town of Larsmont, Minnesota, in the United States in the early 1900s. They originally requested to name the town Larsmo, but railroad officials did not approve and instead chose the name Larsmont.

== Coat-of-arms ==
The municipal coat-of-arms was officially approved in 1952. It has been designed by Gustav von Numers and depicts a two-masted skötbåt in silver on a blue shield (a skötbåt is a traditional fishing vessel which could be sailed or rowed). The coat-of-arms symbolizes the boat-building and fishing traditions in the municipality.

== Religion ==
Prominent religious movements in the region are the Evangelical Lutheran Church of Finland, Laestadianism (the Word of Peace tendency), as well as a smaller number of Baptists. Larsmo has traditionally had the country's highest fertility rate – 3.4 in a 2013–2015 study – due to the influence of Laestadianism.

== Settlements ==
The two largest islands are called Larsmo and Eugmo, and these two islands also make up the two administrative villages of the municipality. Other larger settlements are Risöhäll, Holm, Eugmo, and Bosund. The church village is called Fagernäs and is located on the Larsmo island.

== Economy ==
The municipality has always been connected to ship-building and still is. Among the more well-known ship-building companies are Baltic Yachts, which builds high-tech sailing yachts in carbon fiber, as well as Bella boats.

Larsmo has one of the lowest unemployment rates in Finland.

== Culture ==
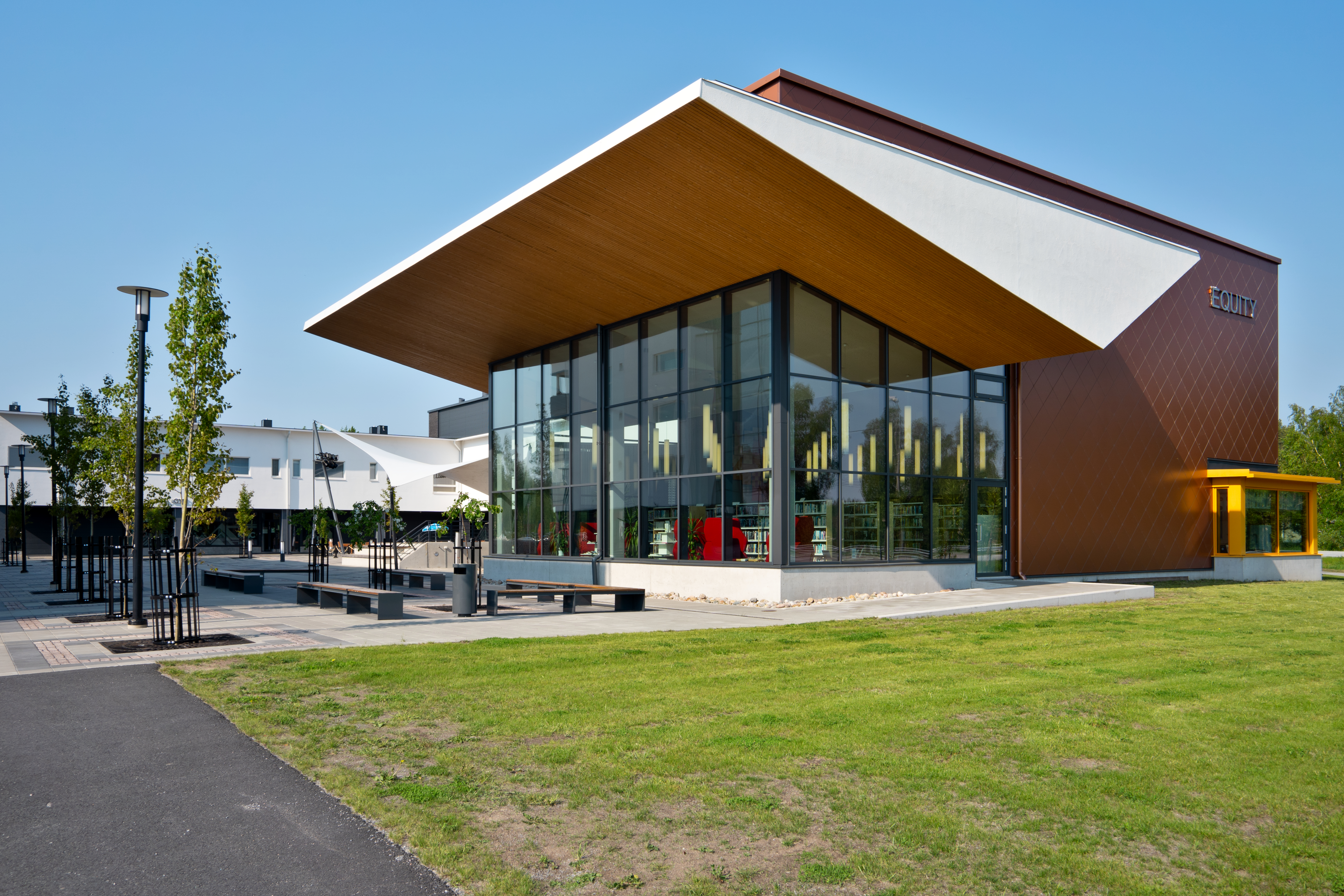
A library in Larsmo.

A number of cultural events are held every summer in the municipality. A small jazz festival, called Föusjazz ('barn jazz'), is arranged every summer at the stone barn in Fagernäs. Many famous jazz artists have appeared at the festival. Many events are also held at Köpmanholmen and at Bjärgas hembygdsgård. A fish market is held every summer at the fishing harbour in Bosund.

There are two museums in the municipality. The previously mentioned Bjärgas hembygdsgård is an open-air museum portraying rural society in the 1930s and also a countryside shop from the 1950s. The Bosund Boat, Fishing and Hunting Museum (Bosund Båt-, Fiske- och Jaktmuseum) displays older boats and fishing and hunting equipment. The exhibit Terra Mare at Köpmanholmen shows how post-glacial rebound has affected the coastal landscape.

The two libraries in Holm and in Bosund serve the inhabitants of the municipality. Further, there are four school libraries: Risö, Näs, Holm, and Cronhjelm School libraries.

== Transportation ==
Roads

Larsmo is located between the cities of Jakobstad in the south and Kokkola in the north. The lively trafficked Seven Bridges' Road (De sju broarnas väg) goes through Larsmo and connects the municipality with the mainland. The road's official designation is Regional Road 749.

Buses

The INGSVA (previously: Haldin & Rose) bus company has a number of lines going through the municipality.

Railroad

There is no railroad in the municipality. The closest stops are located in Bennäs or Kokkola.

Airports

The closest airports are Kokkola-Pietarsaari Airport, which is about 30 km (20 mi) from Holm, and the Vaasa Airport, which lies about 120 km (75 mi) away. There is also a small field for ultra-light aircraft in Bosund.

Ferries

The closest ferry route to Sweden is Wasaline from Vaasa in Finland to Umeå in Sweden. Jakob Lines, which went from Jakobstad and Kokkola, ceased activity in 1999.

== Recreation ==
There are a number of paved pedestrian roads in the municipality. There are walking paths of different lengths in Holm (8 and 13 km), as well as in Fagernäs (5 km), Bosund (8 km) and on Öuran (5.7 km).

The winter sports are concentrated to Holm where there are 5.5 km of skiing paths as well as facilities for biathlon. Ice hockey rinks are located in Risö, Holm, Näs and Bosund.

There are nine un-supervised beaches in the municipality: Vikarholmen, Assarskär, Fagernäs, Kackur, Sonamo, Köpmanholmen, Annäsgrundet, Svennasminne and Brännbacka. Most of them have dressing rooms, toilets and life-saving equipment.

== Sports ==
The football club Larsmo bollklubb was founded in 1952 and is currently in Division 4. The ice hockey team IF Pucken is currently playing in Division 3.

== Attractions ==
- The archipelago
- Larsmo church, which was constructed in 1787, and designed by Jakob Rijf
- The Grafton monument
- Köpmanholmen

== Twin towns ==
- Norway: Klæbu
- Sweden: Malå
