= Konni Zilliacus =

British politician, diplomat and writer

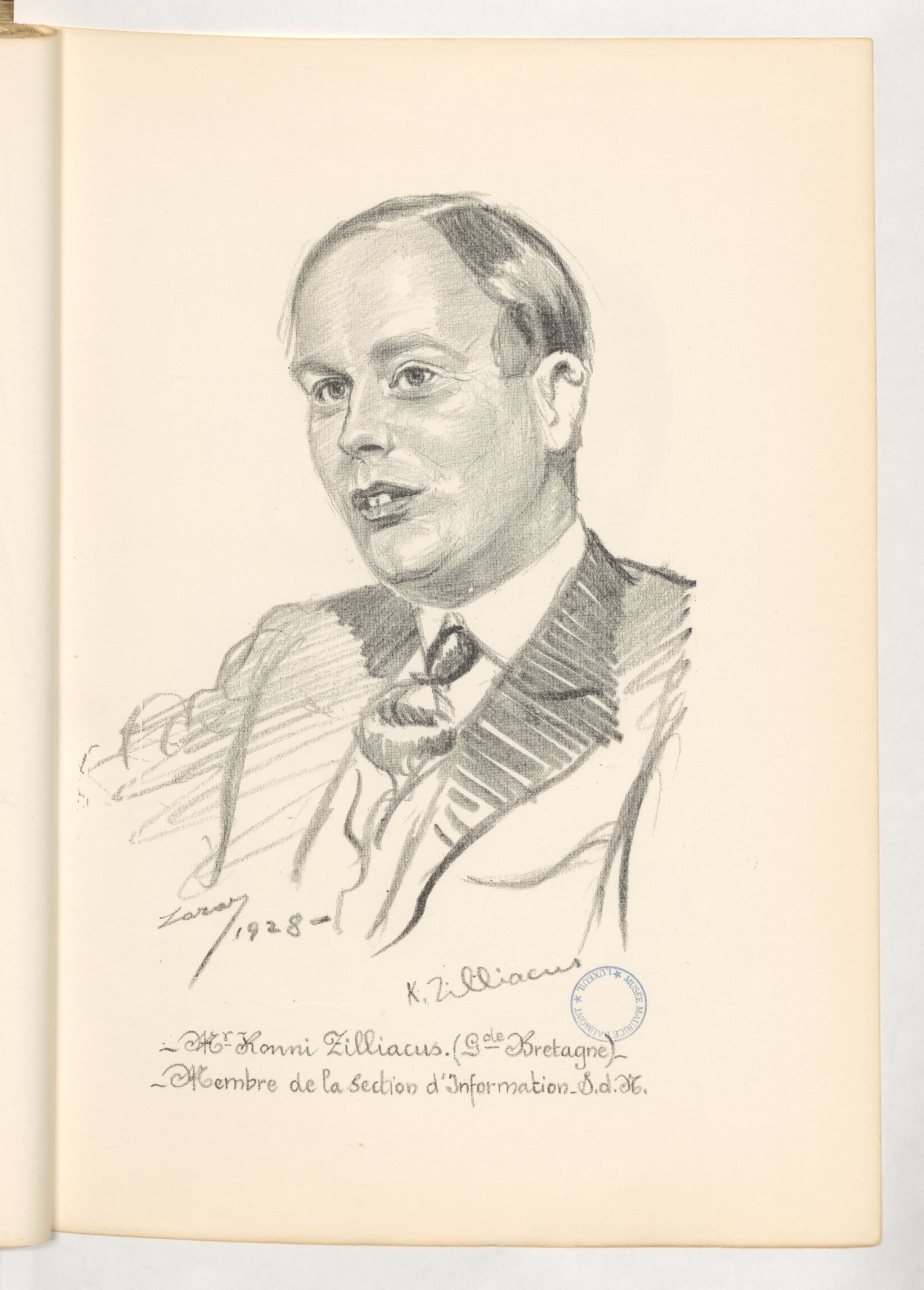
- Portrait by Oscar Lazar, 1928

Member of Parliament for Gateshead
- In office 5 July 1945 – 3 February 1950
- Preceded by: Thomas Magnay
- Succeeded by: Constituency abolished

Member of Parliament for Manchester Gorton
- In office 26 May 1955 – 6 July 1967
- Preceded by: William Oldfield
- Succeeded by: Kenneth Marks

Personal details
- Born: 13 September 1894 Kobe, Japan
- Died: 6 July 1967 (aged 72)
- Party: Labour
- Parent: Konrad Viktor Zilliacus (father)
- Education: Yale University

Konni Zilliacus (13 September 1894 – 6 July 1967) was a British politician, diplomat and writer who was the Member of Parliament for Gateshead from 1945 until 1950, and for Manchester Gorton from 1955 until his death. He was a left-wing Labour Party politician.

Zilliacus spoke nine languages fluently and international issues absorbed much of his energy, both as an official of the League of Nations between the wars, and as a member of the House of Commons in the post-war period. He was widely considered to have had communist sympathies. Having come into conflict with the Labour Party leadership, he was expelled from the party in 1949. In 1950 he lost his seat in parliament, was re-admitted by Labour in 1952, and returned to the Commons in 1955.

Zilliacus campaigned for less spending on weapons. He was a founder member of the Campaign for Nuclear Disarmament and opposed the Vietnam War. His father was Konrad Viktor Zilliacus, a Finnish independence activist.

== Early life ==
Zilliacus was born in Kobe, Japan, the son of exiled Finnish nationalist and journalist Konrad Viktor (Konni) Zilliacus (1855–1924) and American-born Lilian McLaurin Grafe (1873–1938). He travelled the world with his parents until 1909, when they settled in England. Zilliacus then attended Bedales School in Hampshire, where he became friends with the sons of Josiah Clement Wedgwood. He attended Yale University in the US, graduating first in his class in 1915.

During World War I, he applied to the British Royal Flying Corps but was denied for physical reasons. Instead, he found work as an orderly for a French medical unit near the front lines. Soon invalided out of the medical corps with diphtheria, Zilliacus returned to Britain and joined the Union of Democratic Control and worked for the Liberal Party MPs Noel Buxton and Norman Angell. He travelled with Wedgwood to Russia, where he developed a sympathy for the October Revolution, and leaked details of the British intervention in the Russian Civil War to the press. In 1919, newly married to Eugenia Nowicka and with a recently born daughter, Stella Zilliacus, he joined the British Labour Party.

== League of Nations Secretariat ==
Being multilingual, he found work as the British envoy to the League of Nations alongside Philip Noel-Baker. In 1931 during the Japanese invasion of Manchuria he wrote speeches for the League's committee for Cooperation with China along with Alfred Sao-ke Sze, Koo, and Guo Taiqi. He was Geneva's official interpreter for visiting Russians. It was long claimed that, writing as "C. Howard-Ellis", he wrote the textbook for the League: Origins, Structure, and Working of the League of Nations. However, it has been demonstrated that the real author was Dick Ellis.

Zilliacus maintained a correspondence with C. P. Scott of The Manchester Guardian, which in 1935 helped generate popular support within Britain for sanctions against Italy should it attempt to conquer Ethiopia, an invasion which was launched later in the year. He wrote many articles and letters on international affairs on a pro bono basis, usually under pen names such as Vigilantes. Zilliacus was a firm believer in the power of multinational organizations to prevent war, but he could not lead British foreign policy to work through the League. He worked diligently for the League of Nations until the Nazi invasion of Czechoslovakia, when he resigned from the Secretariat of the League of Nations.

== Parliament ==
In World War II, Zilliacus worked for the Ministry of Information and joined the 1941 Committee.

=== Election to parliament ===
He was elected as Member of Parliament for Gateshead in 1945 and became known as a left-wing critic of government foreign policy.

=== Controversies ===
Zilliacus was frequently accused of being a communist due to his public stances or actions, as he was sympathetic to the Soviet Union. In 1947 George Orwell called him one of the "crypto-communists in Westminster." Notably, in 1949, Zilliacus voted against joining NATO and remained an open critic of Foreign Secretary Ernest Bevin and his ‘anti-Soviet policies’. In 1949, he was expelled from the party, along with Leslie Solley. To compensate, he helped found the Labour Independent Group, although he would later leave the group when it supported Joseph Stalin over Josip Broz Tito as he was sympathetic to the latter in the Tito-Stalin Split. He sought re-election in the 1950 general election, but he lost his seat to Labour Party candidate Arthur Moody. During the show-trial of Rudolf Slánský in Czechoslovakia in 1952, due to Zilliacus’ earlier contacts with Czechoslovak communists, Slánský was forced to confess that he had given information to Zilliacus while "planning the restoration of capitalism in Czechoslovakia"; an accusation Zilliacus dismissed as "quite fantastic".

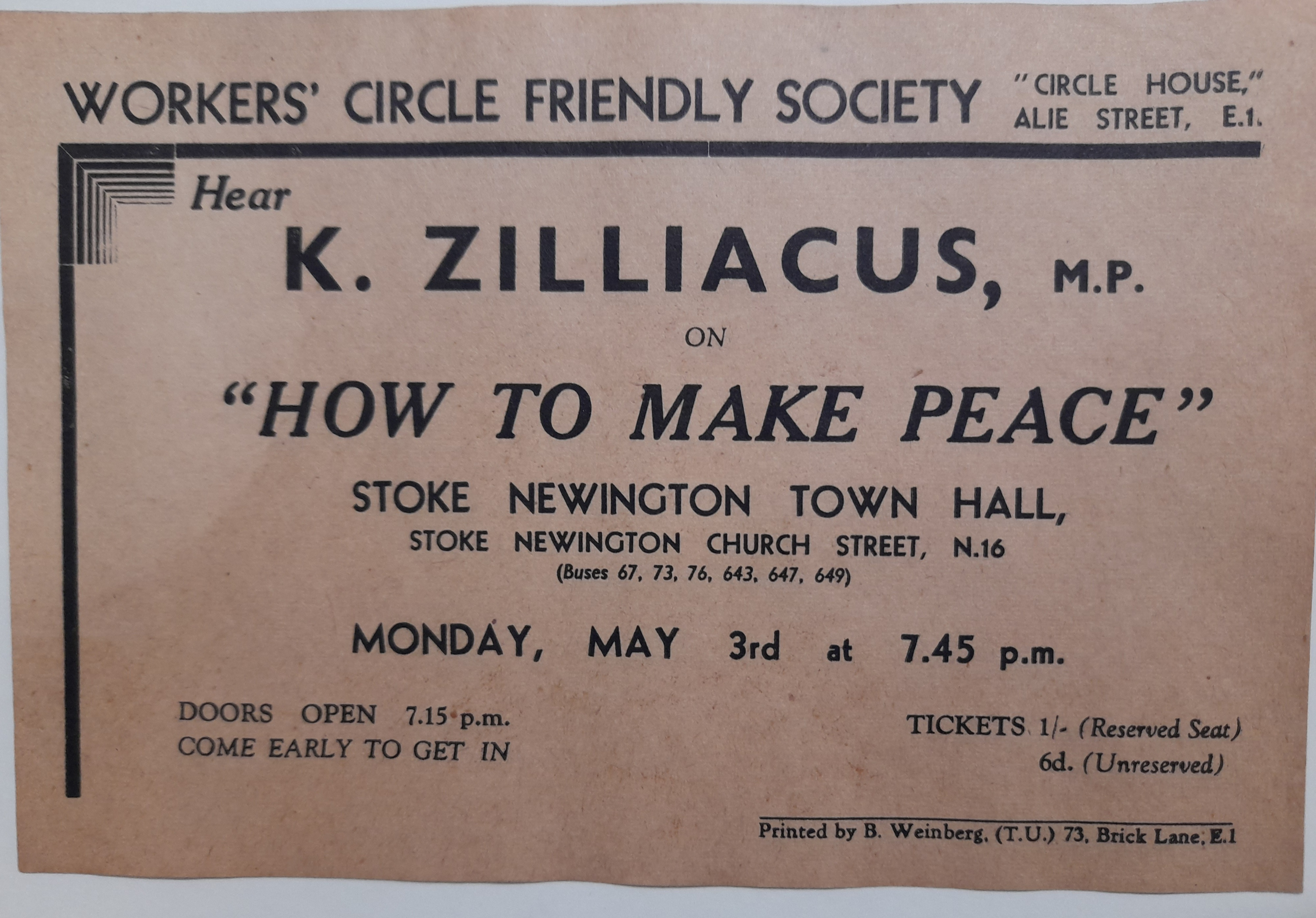
Card advertising Zilliacus's speech in Hackney printed by Weinberg E1.

Zilliacus made public speeches outside parliament to different audiences, including The Workers Circle Friendly Society at Stoke Newington Town Hall.

=== Return to parliament ===
In 1952, he was readmitted to the Labour Party, and he won the Manchester Gorton constituency in the 1955 general election. He held the seat until his death, on 6 July 1967. He became a founder member of the Campaign for Nuclear Disarmament and in 1961 was suspended from the party for several months for writing an article for a Czech magazine. Zilliacus was a prominent pacifist, pushing for less spending on arms and nuclear testing during the 1950s and opposing the Vietnam War during the 1960s. He died of leukemia, aged 72. According to one historian, Zilliacus died "an unrepentant admirer of both Harold Wilson and N. S. Khrushchev".

== Personal life ==
Zilliacus married, in 1919, Eugenia Nowicka, a 19-year-old Polish woman revolutionary whom he had met while in Siberia. She took the name Eugenia Nowicka Zilliacus.

Zilliacus never married his better-known partner Jan Trimble, daughter of Laurence Trimble, an American film director of the silent era, though she took the name Zilliacus and had a daughter by him in 1945. The Zilliacus family (she had other children) lived from the 1940s onward in the St. John's Wood and nearby Maida Vale areas of London, where she was a London Zoo volunteer and, until her death in 1999, a stalwart of the local (Paddington) Constituency Labour Party.

== Works ==
Zilliacus wrote under several pseudonyms, as given here.

- Williams, Roth (1923). The League of Nations Today. London: George Allen & Unwin.
- Williams, Roth (1924). The Technique of the League of Nations. League of Nations Union.
- Williams, Roth (1925). The League, the Protocol, And The Empire. London: George Allen & Unwin.
- Vigilantes (1933). The Dying Peace. London: New Statesman.
- Vigilantes (1935). Inquest on Peace: An Analysis of the National Government's Foreign Policy. Gollancz.
- Vigilantes (1935). Abyssinia: The Essential Facts In The Dispute and An Answer To the Question -"Ought We To Support Sanctions?". London: New Statesman and Nation.
- Covenanter (1936). Labour and war resistance. Fabian Research Series. London: Gollancz.
- Vigilantes (1938). Why the League Has Failed. Left Book Club. London: Victor Gollancz.
- Diplomaticus (1938). The Czechs and their Minorities. London: T. Butterworth.
- Vigilantes (1939). Between Two Wars? The Lessons of the Last World War in Relation to The Preparations for The Next. London: Penguin.
- Vigilantes (1939). Why We Are Losing the Peace: The National Governments Foreign Policy its Causes Consequences and Cure. London: Victor Gollancz\.
- K. Zilliacus ("Vigilantes") (1944). The Mirror of the Past - Lest it Reflect the Future. Left Book Club. Victor Gollancz.
- Diplomaticus (K. Zilliacus) (1945). Can the Tories Win the Peace? And How They Lost the Last One. London: Victor Gollancz.
- Zulliacus, Konni (1946). Britain, U.S.S.R. and World Peace. London: British-Soviet Society.
- K. Zilliacus (1947). Mirror of the present : the way the world is going. London: Meridian Books.
- Zilliacus, K. (1949). I Choose Peace. Harmondsworth: Penguin.
- K. Zilliacus (1949). Dragon's teeth : the background, contents and consequences of the North Atlantic Pact. London.
- Zilliacus, Konni (1949). Why I was expelled. London: Collets.
- K. Zilliacus (1952). Tito of Yugoslavia. London: Mchael Joseph.
- Zilliacus, Konni (1955). Four Power Talks: For Peace or War?. London: Union of Democratic Control.
- K.Zillliacus (1957). A New Birth of Freedom? World Communism after Stalin. London: Secker & Warburg.
- Konni Zilliacus (1960). aNATOmy of a Sacred Cow. Campaign for Nuclear Disarmament.
- Zilliacus, Konni (1963). Our Lives and Cuba: What Britain must do to Survive. London: Gladiator.
- K. Ziliacus (1966). Labour's crisis : its nature, cause and cure.

Parliament of the United Kingdom
Preceded by Thomas Magnay	Member of Parliament for Gateshead; 1945–1950	Constituency abolished
Preceded by William Oldfield	Member of Parliament for Manchester Gorton; 1955–1967	Succeeded by Kenneth Marks
