= Manchester Academy (secondary school) =

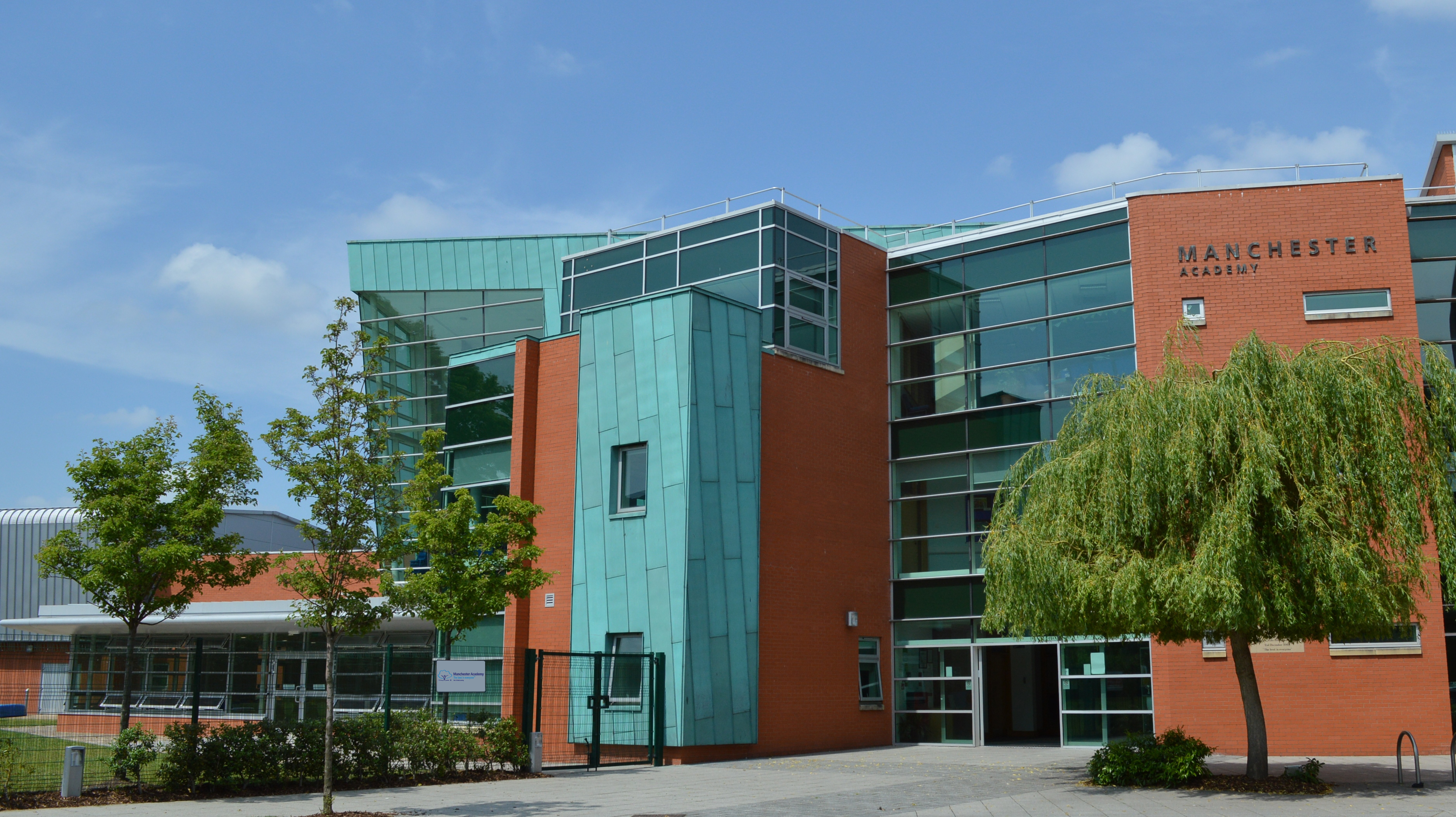

Location
- Moss Lane East; Moss Side, Manchester, M14 4PX; England
- 53°27′33″N 2°14′02″W

Information
- Type: Academy
- Established: 2002
- Founder: United Learning
- Local authority: Manchester
- Department for Education URN: 134224 Tables
- Ofsted: Reports
- Principal: James Eldon
- Gender: Coeducational
- Age: 11 to 16
- Enrolment: 1080
- Former name: Ducie Central High School
- Website: manchester-academy.org

Manchester Academy is a coeducational secondary school within the English Academy programme, in Moss Side, Manchester. It is situated on Moss Lane East (B5219), near Denmark Road, with the University of Manchester nearby to the north and the Whitworth Art Gallery to the east.

== History ==
The Manchester Central Grammar School for Boys was established on Whitworth Street in 1900. While the Central High School for Girls remained at Whitworth Street, the Central High School for Boys moved to Kirkmanshulme Lane in Longsight in 1958. It amalgamated with Victoria Park Secondary School to form the Central High School for Boys (as a comprehensive school) in 1967. It then amalgamated with Ducie Technical College to form the Ducie Central High School for Boys in 1982.

The school moved to Moss Side, where new buildings were built at a cost of £5 million (the old site is now occupied by Belle Vue Centre), in September 1995. Iain Duncan Smith visited the school in October 2002. After a £12 million new building had been completed, the school re-opened under the leadership of Dame Kathryn August as the Manchester Academy in September 2003.

== Admissions ==
Since its reopening, it has been run by United Learning, a subsidiary of the United Church Schools Trust. Over half of pupils are entitled to free school meals and many are from refugee or non-English speaking backgrounds.

== Academic performance ==
In 2009, the Manchester Evening News reported that the school had achieved an 'astounding transformation', with its predecessor once branded 'the worst in the country', it was now rated by Ofsted, the schools inspectorate, as 'outstanding'. The fact that many pupils come from diverse and often economically impoverished backgrounds led experts to state that pupils at the academy performed much better than they would at most other schools.

=== Awards ===
Pupils from the academy won the national Apax – Mosaic Enterprise Challenge 2009/10 Award, with their 'virtual business' having generated profits of over £6.3 million online. Attending a ceremony at Atlantic House, London, in March 2010, they were awarded a trophy and a cheque for £3,000 from BBC Dragon's Den and Radio Four Today presenter Evan Davis and Khawar Mann of Apax Partners.

Having won the regional final of the Debate Mate competition, pupils from the academy competed as national finalists in the 2010 Richard Koch Cup Debating Final, chaired by Channel Four's Krishnan Guru-Murthy at the House of Lords.

== Notable alumni ==
=== Central Grammar School for Boys ===
- Sir John Alcock, first flight across the Atlantic
- Joel Barnett, Baron Barnett, Labour MP from 1964 to 1983 for Heywood and Royton
- Sir George Cartland
- Sir James Chadwick, awarded the Nobel Prize in Physics in 1935 for discovering the neutron
- Sir Alcon Copisarow, Chief Scientific Officer from 1962–64 to the Ministry of Technology
- Prof William Alexander Deer, Vice Chancellor of the University of Cambridge from 1971 to 1973, Master from 1966 to 1975 of Trinity Hall, Cambridge, and Professor of Mineralogy and Petrology from 1961 to 1978
- Robert Donat, actor who won the best actor Oscar in 1939
- Prof. Robert Geoffrey Edwards, Professor of Human Reproduction from 1985 to 1989 at the University of Cambridge Nobel Prize for Medicine and inventor, with Patrick Christopher Steptoe, of in vitro fertilisation (IVF) in 1978
- Georg Eisler, painter
- Rev George Kenneth Giggall, Bishop of St Helena from 1973 to 1979, and Royal Navy chaplain
- Prof. Edward Gregson, composer and Principal from 1996 to 2008 of the Royal Northern College of Music
- Sir Henry Hardman, Permanent Secretary from 1963 to 1964 at the Ministry of Defence
- Frank Hatton, local Labour MP from 1973 to 1974 for Manchester Exchange, and from 1974 to 1978 for Manchester Moss Side
- Rabbi Louis Jacobs
- Prof. William Johnson, Professor of Mechanics from 1975 to 1982 at the University of Cambridge, and Professor of Mechanical Engineering from 1960 to 1975 at the University of Manchester
- Arthur Knowles, Secretary General from 1946 to 1956 of the Association of British Chambers of Commerce
- Kenneth Marks, Labour MP from 1967 to 1983 for Manchester Gorton
- Sir Derek Roberts, Provost from 1989 to 1999 and 2002-03 of University College London (UCL)
- David Rohl
- Benny Rothman, rambler and activist
- Brian Statham, English cricketer (fast bowler). Played for England 1951–65. In 1962 he broke the record held by Alec Bedser for the most wickets taken by an English bowler.
- James L. Tuck, physicist, member of the Manhattan project, shaped explosives expert

=== Ducie Technical High School for Boys ===
- Mel Ainscow, Professor of Education at the University of Manchester
- Sir Howard Bernstein, chief executive since 1998 of Manchester City Council
- Peter McGarr, composer
- Lord Monks, trades unionist
- Sir Trefor Morris, chief constable from 1984 to 1990 of Hertfordshire Constabulary
- John Thaw, actor.
- George Waring, actor
- Paul Young, singer and percussionist

== Other local United Learning Trust schools ==
- Salford City Academy
- Stockport Academy
- William Hulme's Grammar School

== See also ==
- List of schools in Manchester
- Manchester Central High School in New Hampshire, USA
