= SS John Grafton =

Coordinates: 63°50′02″N 22°38′46″E

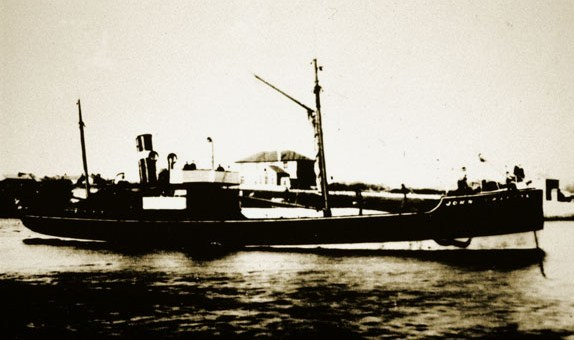

History
- Name: John Grafton (1883–1905); Luna (1905)
- Owner: Akashi Motojiro (1905)
- Launched: 1883
- Fate: Destroyed by explosives 1905

General characteristics
- Type: Steamboat
- Tonnage: 315 tons

SS John Grafton was a steamship that was used in an unsuccessful attempt by Finnish independence activists and Japanese military intelligence to smuggle large quantities of arms for the Finnish resistance to the Imperial Russian regime in 1905 during the Russo-Japanese War. The matter later came to be known as the "Grafton Affair".

When Finland had become a grand duchy in the Russian empire in 1809, Finland was allowed to keep its own laws, language and religion. In the end of the 19th century this position was threatened, as Russification policies were suggested and attempted. The Russification campaign resulted in resistance of which the arms smuggling by John Grafton was a part. Eventually no military action resulted at the time, though Finland did eventually declare independence on 6 December 1917 following the October Revolution in Russia.

John Grafton was a 315-ton ship built in 1883. It was bought by Japanese army officer and intelligence agent Akashi Motojiro in 1905 to aid an armed uprising in Finland. This was done nominally in the name of a sympathetic London wine merchant named Robert Richard Dickenson. The ship sailed to Flushing and on 28 July and the ship was renamed the Luna. The wine merchant sold the ship to a non British firm on this day, but did not report it. However, a subsequent inquiry conducted by the Maritime Department of the Board of Trade in September was able to retrospectively remove the ship from the English register of shipping, avoiding embarrassment when its subsequent activities came to the attention of the Russian authorities.

== Journey in 1905 ==
After the Russification in Finland increased, the resistance activist Konni Zilliacus in 1905 organized the smuggling of weapons to the Finnish and the Russian resistance movements. With Japanese financing, John Grafton was bought. In London the ship was loaded with 15,560 Swiss Vetterli M/1869-71 rifles, 2.5 million rounds of ammunition for them (both bought in France), 2,500 Webley Mk IV and WG revolvers and 3 tons of explosive gelatin; additionally the cargo seems to have included 200 small automatic pistols and 300 Mauser C96 pistols bought in Hamburg.

According to the original plan, the weapons were to be transported via the Netherlands and Copenhagen to a meeting place in the Gulf of Finland, from where the journey would continue to Saint Petersburg. On arrival, a part of the cargo would be offloaded and given to Russian revolutionaries.

After running into a few problems the route was changed, and the ship set course towards the Gulf of Bothnia and the town of Kemi, where part of the cargo was offloaded. The journey continued to Jakobstad which, like Kemi, was a centre of the Finnish resistance. The ship was piloted into the rocky archipelago north of Jakobstad and the offloading of the weapons was conducted without any serious problems. When the ship continued her journey south, she ran aground. The crew started to salvage what remained of the weapons. It quickly became clear that the whole cargo could not be salvaged. The captain, J.W. Nylander, made the decision to blow up the ship to avoid it ending up in the hands of the Russian authorities. On the afternoon of 10 September 1905 the ship was blown up with three powerful charges. The sound of the explosion was heard some 50 kilometers away.

Despite the harsh censorship during the Russification, widespread speculation about the event occurred in both Finnish and foreign newspapers. Even though the plans for John Grafton did not pan out, the event is considered one of the first concrete actions for an independent Finland. In 1930 a monument was unveiled at Orrskär in Larsmo to commemorate the event. To this day parts of the cargo and ship lie at the bottom of the gulf.

The weapons that had been offloaded started to spread out into the villages (where they amongst other things were used for moose hunting) and were later part of the armory of the White Guard when it founded in 1917. The already obsolete weapons (the Vetterli M 1869 was a black powder rifle) were never used in any military manner. The Russian authorities salvaged parts of the cargo and sank them further out where the depth was greater.

== See also ==
- Nunobiki Maru
- Finnish Jäger troops

== Sources ==
- Futrell, Michael (1963). Northern Underground: Episodes of Russian Revolutionary Transport and Communications through Scandinavia and Finland 1863-1917. Faber and Faber.
- Olin, K-G (2005). Grafton-Affären. Olimex. ISBN 952-9600-13-5.
