= Labour Independent Group =

- Leader: Denis Pritt
- Founded: 1948
- Dissolved: 1950
- Split from: Labour
- Ideology: Socialism pro-Communism; Anti-NATO

The Labour Independent Group was an organisation of five former Labour Party Members of Parliament (MPs) in the United Kingdom.

In April 1948, the MP John Platts-Mills organised a petition in support of Pietro Nenni and the Italian Socialist Party, who were in alliance with the Italian Communist Party, counter to Labour Party policy. He was expelled from the party. In May 1949, six Labour MPs voted against signing the North Atlantic Treaty, and of them, Lester Hutchinson, Leslie Solley and Konni Zilliacus were expelled.

All these MPs were known for their communist sympathies, and the four joined with another independent MP, Denis Pritt, who had been expelled from the Labour Party in 1940 for supporting the Soviet Union in the Winter War, to form the Labour Independent Group. Pritt was appointed the group's Chairman.

The group regarded Soviet foreign policy as essentially defensive, and criticized the United States and the United Kingdom as bearing the greatest responsibility for the Cold War.

Zilliacus developed a negative impression of Stalin when the two met, and so he resigned from the group later in 1949, instead adopting a position of support for Josip Broz Tito, who he had also met. Both Zilliacus and the four remaining members stood as "Independent Labour" candidates in the 1950 general election, but all lost their seats, thus dissolving the group.

== Members ==
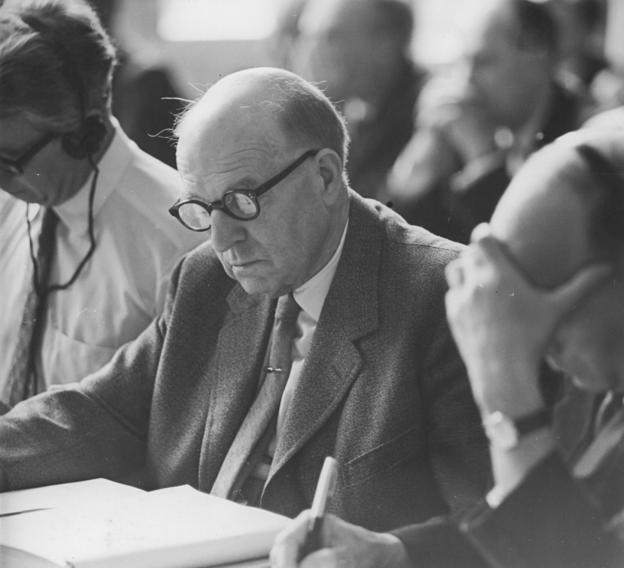
Group Chairman: Denis Pritt.

- Chairman: Denis Pritt (1887–1972) - MP for Hammersmith North, 1935–1950
- Lester Hutchinson (1904–1983) - MP for Manchester Rusholme, 1945–1950
- John Platts-Mills (1906–2001) - MP for Finsbury, 1945–1950
- Leslie Solley (1905–1968) - MP for Thurrock, 1945–1950
- Konni Zilliacus (1894–1967) - MP for Gateshead, 1945–1950

== 1950 general election results ==
Constituency	Candidate	Votes	Percentage	Position
Hammersmith North	D. N. Pritt	6,457	25.2	3
Shoreditch and Finsbury	John Platts-Mills	7,602	18.0	3
Thurrock	Leslie Solley	4,250	9.8	3
Walthamstow West	Lester Hutchinson	704	2.0	4

Konni Zilliacus stood in Gateshead East as an independent Labour candidate, winning 5,001 votes (14.8%) and coming 3rd.

== See also ==
- List of Labour Party breakaway parties (UK)
