= Tim Janman =

British politician

Member of Parliament for Thurrock
- In office 11 June 1987 – 16 March 1992
- Preceded by: Oonagh McDonald
- Succeeded by: Andrew MacKinlay

Personal details
- Born: Timothy Janman; 9 September 1956 (age 70)
- Party: Conservative
- Education: University of Nottingham

Timothy Simon Janman (born 9 September 1956) is a former Conservative Party politician in England. He was Member of Parliament (MP) for Thurrock in Essex from 1987 to 1992, when he lost to the Labour Party candidate Andrew Mackinlay.

== Early years ==
Tim Janman was the son of Jack and Irene Janman; he had two half-brothers, Clive and Rodger. Janman was educated at the Sir William Borlase's Grammar School in Marlow, Buckinghamshire, and the University of Nottingham. On 29 September 1990 he married Shirley Buckingham (née Silvey). He worked as a personnel officer at the Ford Motor Company from 1979 to 1987.

== Political activities ==
Janman was chairman of the Nottingham University Conservative Association 1976–1977, and was national senior vice-chairman of the Federation of Conservative Students 1980–1981. He served as chairman of the Selsdon Group 1983–1987, later becoming a vice-president. In 1987, he served, briefly, as a member of Southampton City Council. In 1990, he became president of the London Swinton circle.

Janman was vice-president of the Jordan is Palestine Committee, joint secretary of the Conservative backbench Employment Committee 1987–1988, joint vice-chairman of same 1988–1992. He was a member of the Parliamentary Select Committee on Employment from 1989 to 1992, and joint secretary of the Conservative Backbench Home Affairs Committee, also from 1989 to 1992. Janman's special interests lay in the economy, privatisation, trade union reform, "law and order", and "immigration and resettlement".

Janman was a member of the Conservative Monday Club and was present at their South Africa Dinner, given for Andries Treurnicht on 5 June 1989.

On 10 October 1989, Janman joined Nicholas Budgen, MP, and Lord Moyne (in the chair) as speakers at a major fringe meeting organised by the Young Monday Club, heralded as "The End of the English? – Immigration and Repatriation". Janman was subsequently quoted by journalist Judy Jones in The Daily Telegraph as saying that: "if you look at the lack of immigration control in the past, then yes, Britain has become the dustbin of the world". He added that there was a need to offer voluntary repatriation to some members of ethnic minorities settled in the UK, which did not wish to integrate with the indigenous population.

Parliament of the United Kingdom
Preceded by Oonagh McDonald	Member of Parliament for Thurrock; 1987–1992	Succeeded by Andrew MacKinlay
