= Konrad Zilliacus =

Finnish independence activist (1855–1924)

Konni Zilliacus
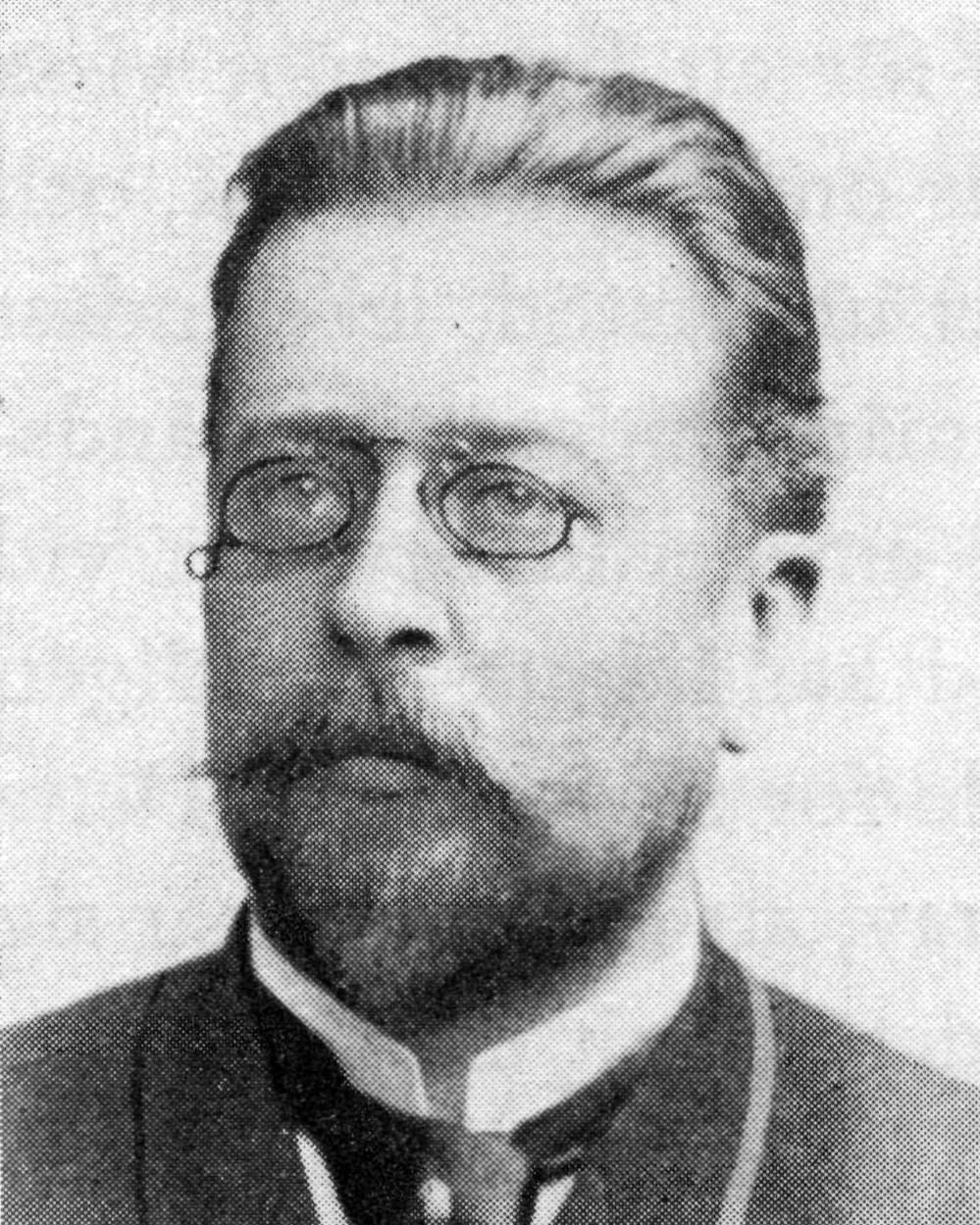
- Konni Zilliacus
- Born: Konrad Viktor Zilliacus; 18 December 1855; Helsinki, Grand Duchy of Finland, Russian Empire
- Died: 24 June 1924 (aged 68); Helsinki, Finland
- Occupations: journalist, revolutionary
- Known for: Finnish independence leader

Konrad Viktor "Konni" Zilliacus (18 December 1855, in Helsinki – 19 June 1924, in Helsinki) was a Finnish independence activist involved in the Grafton Affair in 1905.

== Early life ==
Zilliacus was born in Finland, then part of the Russian Empire. His parents were senator and the mayor of Helsinki Henrik Wilhelm Johan Zilliacus and Ida Charlotta Söderhjelm, daughter of the tax collector Johan Ulrik Söderhjelm. He studied law and entered the civil service in the office of the Governor-General.

In 1878 Zilliacus married the widow Lovisa Ehrnrooth, eleven years his senior, and the couple lived in considerable style at the Mariefors estate in Tusby, with a particular passion for horses and lavish entertaining. In May 1889, however, Zilliacus abandoned his wife, children and mounting debts and fled to America, ruining his wealthy father — senator Wilhelm Zilliacus — in the process. He became a newspaper reporter, in which capacity he travelled the world, living for a period in Costa Rica, then in Chicago. He lived from 1894 to 1896 in Japan — when his son Konni Zilliacus was born in Kobe — followed by Egypt and Paris. He returned to Finland in 1898, and submitted a petition to Tsar Nicholas II in 1899 demanding a constitution. He subsequently relocated to Stockholm in Sweden in 1900, where he began to publish a newspaper Fria Ord ("Free Speech") which supported independence for Finland.

== Revolutionary activities ==
As one of the early leaders of the Finnish independence movement, he cultivated relations with the Russian revolutionary movement, and smuggled his newspaper and other revolutionary literature from Sweden to Finland on his yacht, as well as weapons. So feared was he by the Russian authorities that in 1903 Governor-General Nikolai Bobrikov issued a personal arrest warrant for Zilliacus alone, unlike other exiled opposition leaders.

In February 1904, he met with Japanese military attaché and spymaster, Colonel Akashi Motojirō, who provided large sums of money to assist him in developing subversive activities in an attempt to create domestic political instability during the Russo-Japanese War. Zilliacus met with Polish independence activist Roman Dmowski and Russian revolutionary leader Georgii Plekhanov as well as other dissidents. With Japanese assistance, Zilliacus organized and chaired a conference of Russian revolutionary organizations in Paris in September 1904, which agreed upon a program of legal and illegal means to replace the current autocracy with a democratic government. When Finland's constitutionalist leadership distanced itself from the Paris conference, the dissenting activists founded the Finnish Active Resistance Party in November 1904.

Following the abortive uprising in January 1905, he organized a second conference in Geneva in April 1905, with the participation of eleven revolutionary organizations. With Japanese financing, the conference purchased the steamer SS John Grafton and a large quantity of arms, which they unsuccessfully attempted to smuggle into Russia on 8 September 1905.

His cousin, the historian Alma Söderhjelm, described Zilliacus as a combination of grandseigneur and cowboy, equally capable of noble principle and reckless adventure in his dealings with border guards and customs officers.

== Subsequent career ==
Zilliacus moved back to Helsinki in 1906; however, once his connections with the Japanese became public, he was forced to flee to the United Kingdom with his family in 1909. His son, Konni Zilliacus was a Labour Party Member of Parliament of the United Kingdom for Gateshead and expert on British foreign policy.

Zillacus returned to Finland in 1918, and died in a nursing home in Helsinki. In his final days, he wrote memoirs of his underground activities, as well as a cookbook.
