= David Harris (British politician) =

British politician

David Harris OBE
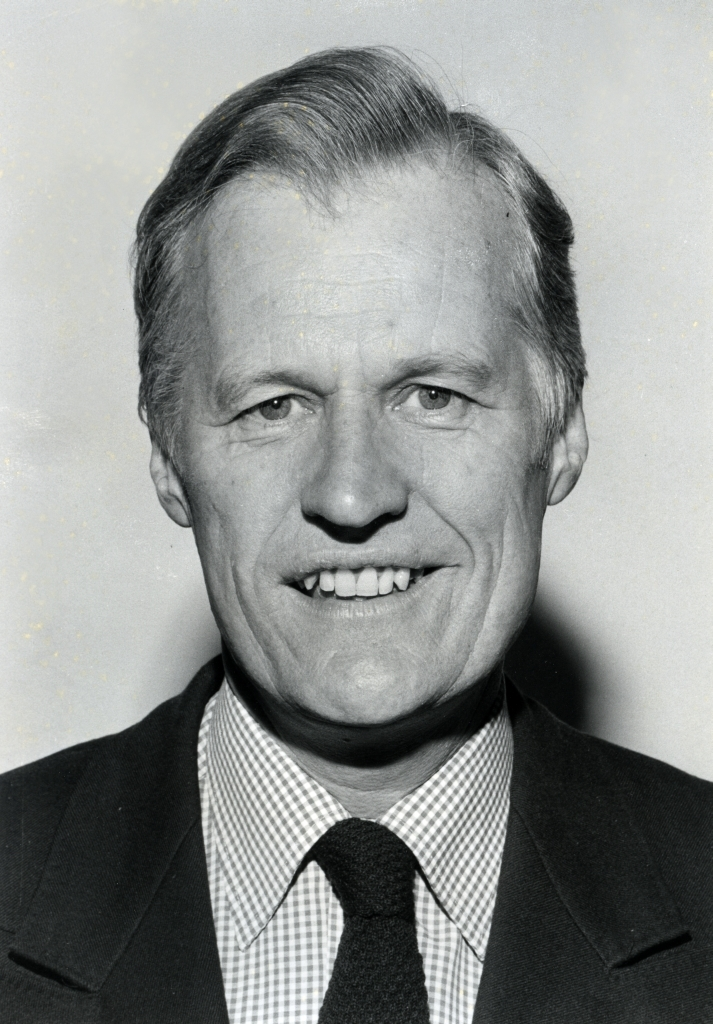

Member of Parliament for St Ives
- In office 9 June 1983 – 8 April 1997
- Preceded by: John Nott
- Succeeded by: Andrew George

Member of the European Parliament for Cornwall and Plymouth
- In office 7 June 1979 – 14 June 1984
- Preceded by: Constituency established
- Succeeded by: Christopher Beazley

Member of the Greater London Council
- In office 1968 – 5 May 1977
- Constituency: Bromley (1968–1973); Ravensbourne (1973–1977)

Personal details
- Born: 1 November 1937 (age 87)
- Political party: Conservative
- Education: Mount Radford School

David Anthony Harris OBE (born 1 November 1937) is a British former politician of the Conservative Party, who was a member of the House of Commons, the European Parliament, and the Greater London Council.

== Early life and education ==
Harris was born on 1 November 1937 and attended Mount Radford School in Exeter.

== Political career ==
David Harris was a Conservative member of the Greater London Council from 1968 to 1977, representing Bromley until 1973 and then Ravensbourne. He first stood for Parliament at Mitcham and Morden in February 1974, but was beaten by Bruce Douglas-Mann of the Labour Party.

Harris was Member of Parliament (MP) for St Ives from 1983 until he retired in 1997, and also Member of the European Parliament (MEP) for Cornwall and Plymouth from 1979 to 1984.

== Later life ==
Since retirement from politics in 1997, Harris has carried out several voluntary roles which have included chairman of the Fishermen's Mission charity. He was appointed as an Officer of the Order of the British Empire (OBE) in the 2022 Birthday Honours for political and public service.

Harris lives in Perranwell Station, about six miles west of Truro in Cornwall.

Parliament of the United Kingdom
Preceded by John Nott	Member of Parliament for St Ives; 1983 – 1997	Succeeded by Andrew George
