= Oonagh McDonald =

British academic and politician

Oonagh McDonald CBE

Member of Parliament for Thurrock
- In office 15 July 1976 – 18 May 1987
- Preceded by: Hugh Delargy
- Succeeded by: Tim Janman

Personal details
- Born: Oonagh Anne McDonald; 21 February 1938 (age 88) Stockton-on-Tees, England, UK
- Party: Labour
- Education: University of Bristol
- Website: www.oonaghmcdonald.com

Oonagh Anne McDonald CBE (born 21 February 1938) is a British academic, businesswoman, and former Labour Party politician.

== Early life ==
McDonald was born in Stockton-on-Tees, County Durham, the daughter of Dr HD McDonald, an Irish Protestant minister. The family moved to London and she was educated at the Roan School for Girls in Greenwich, East Barnet Grammar School and King's College London, where she gained a Master's degree in Theology in 1962 and a Ph.D in 1974. She worked variously as a teacher, lecturer, researcher and management consultant. She taught philosophy at the University of Bristol from 1965 to 1976. She also served as a member of the Financial Services Commission in Gibraltar and was a senior consultant on international regulatory and public policy issues.

== Parliamentary career ==
McDonald unsuccessfully contested the seat of South Gloucestershire as the Labour Party candidate at both the February 1974 and October 1974 general elections. She was elected Member of Parliament for Thurrock in the 1976 by-election, following the death of Hugh Delargy. Prior to the by-election, there were only twenty seats in England with bigger Labour majorities than Thurrock. However while McDonald won, her majority was 14,241 votes less than her predecessor had enjoyed at the last election. Reporting the result of the election, The Glasgow Herald argued that as well as being caused by an increased Conservative vote and a significant vote for the far-right National Front, who had not previously stood in Thurrock, this was the result of the fact that "Labour voters in London dockland stayed away in droves". However the same report noted that there was "relief" that Labour had held the seat and that for Prime Minister James Callaghan the most important thing was that McDonald's victory would "swell the Government's effective majority to three."

She became Parliamentary Private Secretary to the Chief Secretary to the Treasury, Joel Barnett (later Lord Barnett), in 1977. She was then Opposition Spokesman on Defence from 1981 to 1983, and then Opposition Spokesman on Treasury and Economic Affairs from 1983 to 1987. At the 1987 general election, she lost Thurrock to the Conservative candidate, Tim Janman.

== Life after Parliament ==
McDonald is currently a director of the British Portfolio Trust, Complaints Commissioner for the London Metal Exchange, ICE Futures and Virt-x and a member of International Monetary Fund's Expert Roster. She was previously a director of the UK Financial Services Authority (formerly the Securities and Investments Board), a director of the General Insurance Standards Council, a director of Skandia Insurance Co Ltd, a director of the Financial Services Ombudsman Scheme, a director of the Investors Compensation Scheme and of Scottish Provident (until demutualised and sold to Abbey National in 2001), and a member of the Gibraltar Financial Services Commission.

She was Gwilym Gibbon Fellow at Nuffield College, Oxford and wrote The Future of Whitehall, Weidenfeld and Nicolson, 1992 and is also the author of Parliament at Work, Methuen, 1989 and The Future of Retail Banking in Europe: A View from the Top, with Professor Kevin Keasey, John Wiley & Sons, 2002, and numerous research papers for a variety of clients including Deloitte's and PricewaterhouseCoopers. In 2013, Bloomsbury Academic Press published her book Fannie Mae and Freddie Mac: Turning the American Dream into a Nightmare. She is currently a visiting fellow in International Institute of Banking & Financial Services at the University of Leeds. She also edits the Journal of Financial Regulation & Compliance. In 1998, she was awarded the CBE for services to financial regulation and business. She has been the chair of the Fairbanking Mark Assessment Panel for the Fairbanking Foundation since November 2013.

Parliament of the United Kingdom
Preceded by Hugh Delargy	Member of Parliament for Thurrock; 1976–1987	Succeeded by Tim Janman
Party political offices
Preceded by Robin Cook	Chair of the Fabian Society; 1991 – 1992	Succeeded by Dianne Hayter
