= Kenneth Marks =

British politician (1920–1988)

Kenneth Marks MP

Member of Parliament for Manchester Gorton
- In office 2 November 1967 – 13 May 1983
- Preceded by: Konni Zilliacus
- Succeeded by: Gerald Kaufman
- Majority: 557 (1.3%)

Parliamentary Private Secretary to the Prime Minister
- In office April 1975 – December 1975
- Prime Minister: Harold Wilson
- Preceded by: William Hamling
- Succeeded by: John Tomlinson

Personal details
- Born: Kenneth Marks; 15 June 1920
- Died: 13 January 1988 (aged 67)
- Party: Labour
- Education: Central High School, Manchester; Manchester Academy (secondary school)
- Occupation: Head teacher

Kenneth Marks (15 June 1920 – 13 January 1988) was a Labour Party politician in the United Kingdom.

Marks was Member of Parliament (MP) for Manchester Gorton from a 1967 by-election to 1983. From 1975 to 1979, he was a junior Environment minister.

He was educated at the Central High School, Manchester and Manchester Academy (secondary school). In 1955 he unsuccessfully contested Manchester Moss Side at the general election.

Before his by-election success, Marks served as a Labour councillor on the Denton Urban District Council, representing Denton West. Prior to entering parliament he was a secondary school head teacher. He was also a member of the National Union of Teachers and served on its advisory committee for secondary schools. In parliament he was chairman of the Labour Party's social security group and vice chairman of its education group, as well as serving on the Select committee on Education and Science. From 1970 to 1971 he served as a whip.

Although Marks was reselected to fight Manchester Gorton some time before the 1983 general election, subsequent changes (the Third Periodic Review) implemented shortly before the election substantially altered the boundaries of the constituency; its largest part, Denton and Audenshaw in the Metropolitan Borough of Tameside, merged with Reddish in the Metropolitan Borough of Stockport to form a new Denton and Reddish constituency. Gorton was included with much of the former Manchester Ardwick constituency, which was renamed Manchester Gorton.

As there were potentially three Labour MPs contesting two new seats, Marks, who was the senior of the three, stood down, allowing Andrew Bennett of Stockport North to inherit Denton and Reddish, and Gerald Kaufman to move across from Ardwick to the new Gorton seat.

Parliament of the United Kingdom
Preceded by Konni Zilliacus	Member of Parliament for Manchester Gorton; 1967–1983	Succeeded by Gerald Kaufman
Government offices
Preceded by William Hamling	Parliamentary Private Secretary to the Prime Minister; April 1975–December 1975	Succeeded by John Tomlinson
