= 1967 Manchester Gorton by-election =

UK Parliamentary by-election

The 1967 Manchester Gorton by-election of 2 November 1967 was held following the death of Labour MP Konni Zilliacus.

The seat was a safe seat for the Labour Party, having been won by Labour at the 1966 United Kingdom general election with a majority of over 8,000 votes.

== Candidates ==
- 47-year-old Kenneth Marks for the defending Labour Party was a councillor in Denton
- For the Conservatives, 28-year-old Winston S Churchill was a journalist for the Times and the grandson of the late former Prime Minister Sir Winston Churchill.
- Terry Lacey was chosen by the local Liberal Party association
- 59-year-old writer John Creasey nominated himself as candidate for the All Party Alliance he had created.
- The Communists chose Victor Eddisford

== Result of the previous general election ==
General election 1966: Manchester Gorton
Party	Candidate	Votes	%	±%
Labour	Konni Zilliacus	24,726	60.10	
Conservative	I K Paley	16,418	39.90	
Majority		8,308	20.20	
Turnout		41,144	72.56	
Labour hold		Swing		

== Result of the by-election ==
Manchester Gorton by-election, 2 November 1967
Party	Candidate	Votes	%	±%
Labour	Kenneth Marks	19,259	45.89	−14.21
Conservative	Winston Churchill	18,682	44.51	+4.61
Liberal	Terry Lacey	2,471	5.89	New
All Party Alliance	John Creasey	1,123	2.68	New
Communist	Victor Eddisford	437	1.04	New
Majority		557	1.38	−18.81
Turnout		41,972		
Labour hold		Swing		
