= Mel Ainscow =

English academic

Melvin Ainscow is an English academic who is Emeritus Professor of Education at the University of Manchester and Professor of Education at the University of Glasgow. He is also Adjunct Professor at Queensland University of Technology, Australia.

He was educated at Ducie High School, the University of Birmingham (MEd), and the University of East Anglia (PhD, 1995). He worked as a lecturer at the University of Cambridge from 1985 to 1995, before being appointed Professor of Education at Manchester in 1995. At Manchester he was also co-director of the Centre for Equity in Education. In 2013 he was appointed a specialist adviser to the House of Commons Education Committee.

Ainscow specializes in the areas of equity, inclusion and school improvement. Between 2007 and 2011 he led the Greater Manchester Challenge a project that involved a partnership between national government, local authorities, schools and many other stakeholders.

Between 2014 and 2017, Ainscow led Schools Challenge Cymru, the Welsh Government's programme to accelerate the rate of improvement across the country's schools. His book, ‘Developing Inclusive Schools: Pathways to Success’, was published by Routledge in June 2024. Another book, 'Struggles for equity in education: The selected works of Mel Ainscow', was published in the Routledge World Library of Educationalists series in July, 2015.

Ainscow was made a CBE in the 2012 New Year Honours, and is a Fellow of the Royal Society of Arts. In July 2025 the British Education Research Association selected him as the winner of the Equality in Education award in recognition of his exceptional and sustained contribution to promoting equity, diversity and inclusion in education.
