= Hugh Delargy =

British politician (1908–1976)

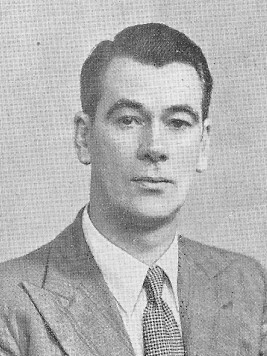
- Delargy, c. 1949

Member of Parliament for Thurrock
- In office 23 February 1950 – 4 May 1976
- Preceded by: Leslie Solley
- Succeeded by: Oonagh McDonald

Member of Parliament for Manchester Platting
- In office 26 July 1945 – 23 February 1950
- Preceded by: J. R. Clynes
- Succeeded by: Constituency abolished

Personal details
- Born: Hugh James Delargy; 4 September 1908 Prestwich, Lancashire, UK
- Died: 4 May 1976 (aged 67)
- Party: Labour
- Occupation: Teacher and journalist

Hugh James Delargy (26 September 1908 – 4 May 1976) was a Labour Party politician and MP.

== Early life and career ==
He was born in Prestwich, Lancashire, of Irish parents.

Delargy was educated in England, Paris and Rome and worked as a teacher, journalist, labourer and insurance official.

== Political career ==
He was a Manchester City Councillor from 1937 to 1946.

Delargy was Member of Parliament for Manchester Platting from 1945 to 1950, and for Thurrock from 1950 until his death in 1976. He was a Labour whip from 1950 to 1952. His successor at the subsequent by-election was Oonagh McDonald.

He was a member of the Anti-Partition of Ireland League, secretary of the Friends of Ireland, and participated in the Manchester Martyrs commemoration in Manchester in 1949 which was addressed by Éamon de Valera.

He was a holder of the Grand Cross of the Polonia Restituta awarded by the Polish government-in-exile.

== Involvement in the John Bodkin Adams Affair ==
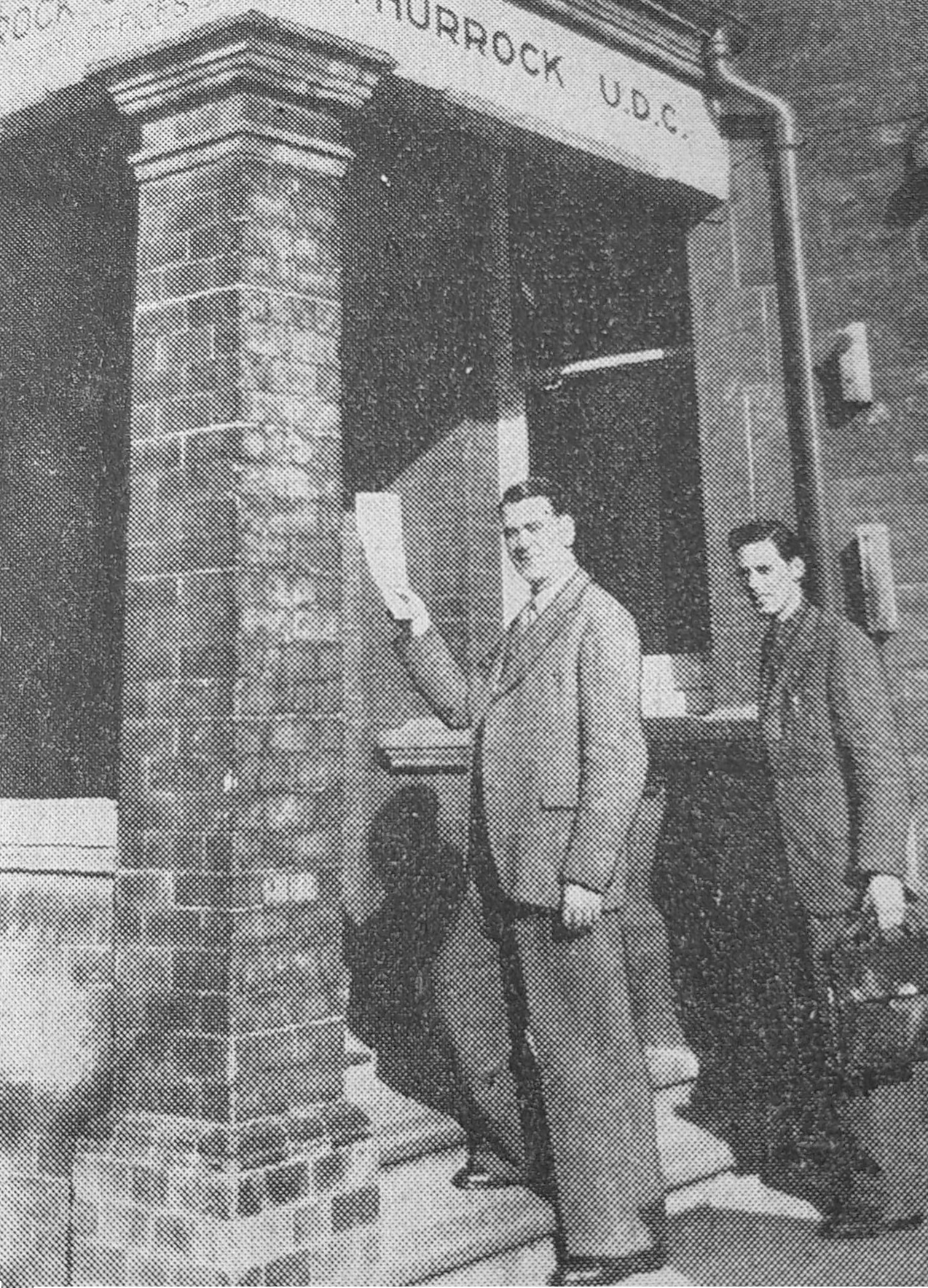
Delargy (left) arriving at the local council offices in Grays to submit his nomination papers for the 1951 general election

Delargy played an interesting but minor part in the aftermath of the John Bodkin Adams trial. Adams, a doctor, was suspected of being a serial killer but was controversially found not guilty in 1957. On 8 November 1956 however, the Attorney-General Reginald Manningham-Buller who was to prosecute the case, handed a confidential Scotland Yard report into Adams' activities to Dr McRae, Secretary of the British Medical Association (BMA), effectively the doctors' trade union in Britain. The prosecution's most valuable document was then copied and passed to Adams' defence counsel.

After a tip-off from a Daily Mail journalist, on 28 November Delargy (in conjunction with MP Stephen Swingler) addressed a question to the Attorney-General to be answered in the House of Commons on 3 December regarding Manningham-Buller's contacts with the General Medical Council and BMA within the last six months. Manningham-Buller was absent on the day in question but gave a written reply stating he had "had no communications with the General Medical Council within the last six months." He avoided referring to the BMA directly and therefore avoided lying, though it could be argued, deliberately misled the House.

Adams was eventually acquitted of the murder of Edith Alice Morrell but was suspected by Home Office pathologist Francis Camps of killing 163 patients.

== Notes ==
Parliament of the United Kingdom
Preceded by J. R. Clynes	Member of Parliament for Manchester Platting; 1945 – 1950	Constituency abolished
Preceded by Leslie Solley	Member of Parliament for Thurrock; 1950 – 1976	Succeeded by Oonagh McDonald
