= Akashi Motojiro =

General in the Imperial Japanese Army

Senior Third Rank Baron Akashi Motojiro
- 明石 元二郎
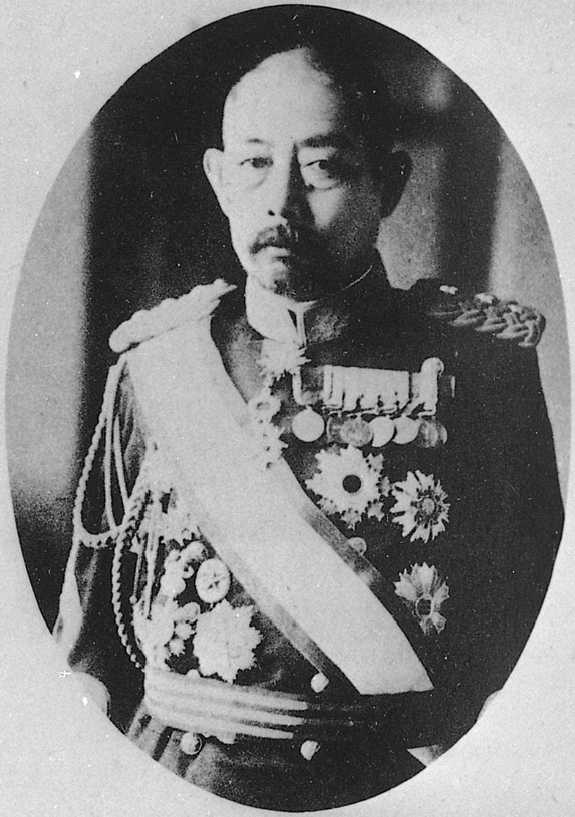

7th Governor-General of Taiwan
- In office 6 June 1918 – 24 October 1919
- Monarch: Taishō
- Preceded by: Andō Teibi
- Succeeded by: Den Kenjirō

Personal details
- Born: 1 September 1864 Fukuoka, Chikuzen, Japan
- Died: 26 October 1919 (aged 55) Fukuoka, Japan

Military service
- Allegiance: Empire of Japan
- Branch/service: Imperial Japanese Army
- Years of service: 1889–1919
- Rank: General
- Battles/wars: First Sino-Japanese War; Russo-Japanese War

Baron Akashi Motojiro (明石 元二郎; 1 September 1864 – 26 October 1919) was a general in the Imperial Japanese Army and the 7th Governor-General of Taiwan from 6 June 1918 to 26 October 1919.

== Early life and career ==
A native of Fukuoka and a graduate of the 1889 class of the Imperial Japanese Army Academy, Akashi was nominally under the Imperial Guard Division attached to the staff of General Kawakami Sōroku during the First Sino-Japanese War. His primary duty was information gathering. In that capacity, he traveled extensively around the Liaodong Peninsula and northern China, Taiwan, and Annam. Toward the end of the war, he was promoted to major.

During the Spanish–American War, he was dispatched as a military observer to the Philippines. During the Boxer Rebellion, he was stationed in Tianjin, northern China. Around this time, he was promoted to lieutenant colonel.

== Espionage during the Russo-Japanese War ==
At the end of 1900, Akashi was sent as a roaming military attaché in Europe, visiting Germany; Switzerland; Sweden, staying in France in 1901; and moving to Saint Petersburg, Russia in 1902. As a member of the Japanese intelligence services, Akashi was involved in setting up an intricate espionage network in major European cities, using specially trained operatives under various covers, members of locally based Japanese merchants and workers, and local people either sympathetic to Japan, or willing to be cooperative for a price.

In the period of growing tensions before the outbreak of the Russo-Japanese War, Akashi had a discretionary budget of 1 million yen (an incredible sum of money in contemporary terms) to gather information on Russian troop movements, naval developments, and to support Russian extremists, in particular Litvinov, Orlovsky (Vatslav Vorovsky), and Lenin. While based at Saint Petersburg, he reportedly recruited the famous spy Sidney Reilly and sent him to Port Arthur, to gather information on the Russian stronghold's defenses. After the start of the war, he used his contacts and network to seek out and to provide monetary and weaponry support to extremist forces attempting to overthrow the Romanov dynasty (see Grafton Affair).

Akashi was also known for his talents as a poet and as a painter, interests that he shared with fellow spy and close friend General Fukushima Yasumasa. It was also a shared interest in poetry and painting that would have enabled him to cultivate Sidney Reilly into working for the Japanese.

Narrowly escaping capture and assassination by the Okhrana several times even before the start of the war, Akashi relocated to Helsinki in late 1904. He traveled extensively to Stockholm, Warsaw, Geneva, Lisbon, Paris, Rome, Copenhagen, Zurich, and even Irkutsk. Akashi helped funnel funds and arms to selected groups of Russian anarchists, secessionists in Finland and Poland, and disaffected Muslim groups in Crimea and Russian Turkestan. Akashi met with Konni Zilliacus in Stockholm as well as Lenin, then in exile in Switzerland. It is widely believed in Japan that Akashi was behind the assassination of Russian Interior Minister Vyacheslav von Plehve (whom many in Japan held responsible for the war); as well as supporting Father George Gapon, who had organized the Bloody Sunday uprising, and the Potemkin mutiny. General Yamagata Aritomo reported to Emperor Meiji that Colonel Akashi was worth "more than 10 divisions of troops in Manchuria" toward Japan winning the war. Akashi was promoted to colonel at age 40.

== Service in Korea ==
In 1905, just prior to the end of the war, he was recalled to Japan, divorced his wife, remarried, and joined the ground forces in Korea as a major general in command of the 14th Infantry Division.

Although Akashi is known to have received support from his close contacts within the Kokuryukai secret society, and although he certainly shared in many of their political goals, his name does not appear on their membership lists and it is mostly likely that he was never actually a member.

After the war, he remained in Korea with General Terauchi Masatake, where he organized the military police. He was promoted to lieutenant general at the age of 49.

He got Korea Colonization Decoration for his merits in Korea on 1 August 1912.

== As Governor-General of Taiwan ==
In 1918, Akashi was promoted to general and appointed by Prime Minister Terauchi as the Governor-General of Taiwan. He also received the title of danshaku (baron) under the kazoku peerage system. During his brief tenure, Akashi devoted significant efforts to improving the infrastructure and economy of Taiwan, and is especially remembered for his electrification projects and the creation of the Taiwan Power Company, and for planning the Sun Moon Lake hydroelectric power plant. The "lake" was originally a swamp. Akashi built concrete pipes to introduce water from the nearby Muddy Water River, and built a huge dam with water siphoned from the river. Akashi's greatest contribution to Taiwan, however, was the construction of the Ka-Nan irrigation system, which totals 16,000 miles (26,000 km) long. It cost the Taiwan government at that time more than one year's budget. The Japanese Imperial Diet had to pass a special law for the extra appropriation of 26 million yen in 1918, equivalent to roughly 2 billion today's US dollars, which was a big burden on Japan's finance at that time, although it would be impossible to build such a dam today with the relatively paltry 2 billion US dollars.

== Death and burial ==
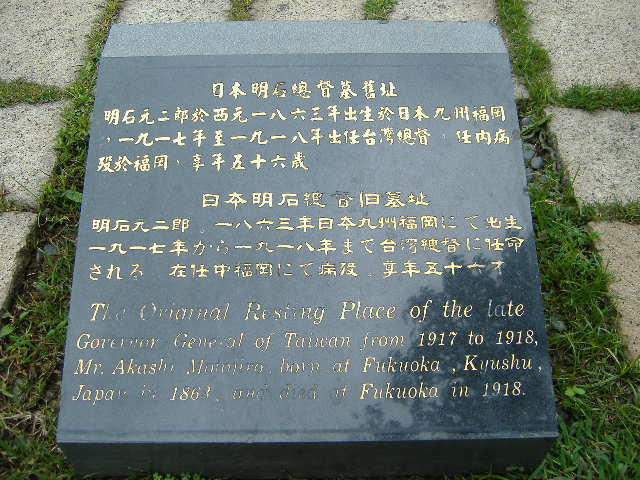
Original tomb of General Akashi Motojirō in Taiwan

Akashi fell ill and died a little over a year after taking office while visiting his home in Fukuoka, becoming the only Governor-General of Taiwan to die in office. In his will, Akashi expressed his desire to be buried in Taiwan to "serve as a national guardian, and a guardian spirit for the people of Taiwan". Akashi was buried at the Sanbanqiao cemetery in Taihoku (modern day Taipei City), becoming the only Japanese Governor-General to be buried in Taiwan. The Taiwanese donated money equivalent to roughly three million modern-day U.S. dollars for construction of a memorial, and support fund for his family, because Akashi himself was too clean to leave anything behind. His remains were exhumed in 1999 and re-interred at the Fuyin Mountain Christian Cemetery in Sanzhi Township, Taipei County (now New Taipei City). Akashi's death has spawned a massive number of conspiracy theories.

The flamboyant exploits (both real and imagined) of "Colonel Akashi" have been the subject of countless novels, manga, movies and documentary programs in Japan, where he has been dubbed the "Japanese James Bond".

== See also ==
- Taiwan under Japanese rule
