= Nottingham University Conservative Association =

University political society

- President: Naomi Frais
- Vice President: Joshua Stamato
- Honorary President: John Hayes
- Ideology: Conservatism, Freedom of Speech
- Mother party: Conservative Party (Disaffiliated since 2015)
- Magazine: Blue Press
- Website: https://su.nottingham.ac.uk/activities/view/conservatives

Nottingham University Conservative Association (NUCA) is a student Conservative association in the University of Nottingham. NUCA is affiliated to the University of Nottingham Students' Union, in addition to the Nottingham Conservative Federation and East Midlands Area Council.

The Honorary President is Rt. Hon. John Hayes MP PC FRSA. Past Honorary Presidents include Jonathan Guinness, Lord Carr of Hadley, R. A. Butler and His Grace the Duke of Rutland. NUCA alumni include many prominent Conservative Party figures. Among them are five current Members of Parliament.

NUCA was inaugurated in 1933, making it one of the oldest union-affiliated societies on campus today, under the name 'Conservative and Unionist Association'. It was briefly called 'Conservative Society' in the 1950s and 'Conservative Future' in the 2000.

On 2 November 2015, NUCA voted to disaffiliate from the Party's youth wing, Conservative Future, making it a fully independent association.

== Events ==
NUCA events and activities vary considerably, depending on the president and committee, but all activities follow four main strands; Port and Policy; speaker meetings; campaigning; and social events.

=== Port & Policy ===
NUCA's most popular regular event is Port & Policy, in which a political parliamentary-style debate (chaired by the President) is accompanied by a few glasses of fine port. A typical Port & Policy debate will consist of three predetermined motions selected by the committee, each of which are debated for around 45 minutes with three short intervals. Port & Policy is normally held in The Great Hall, an impressive and historically significant part of Trent Building. Dress code is usually black tie, with occasional reversion to formal wear when alternate venues are used. Port & Policy's attendance has risen sharply in recent years, with over 80 attendees in the final Port & Policy of the 2015/16 academic year and over 90 for the 2017/2018 academic year.

=== Speaker Meetings ===
NUCA regularly hosts well known speakers including Cabinet Members and Members of Parliament such as Ken Clarke and Anna Soubry. NUCA also invites a number of speakers from Conservative think-tanks and campaign groups. Controversy occurred in 2022 when GB News presenter Calvin Robinson was invited by NUCA to speak. Plans to protest and occupy the Great Hall, where Robinson was due to speak, by the University of Nottingham Left Society were uncovered which led to criticism from Robinson on his Twitter accompanied by screenshots of the alleged plot. To avoid protests, the event was moved by NUCA to an unpublicised location.

=== Campaigning ===
NUCA often campaigns in local and general elections in the constituency of Nottingham South.

In response to the election of the controversial figure Malia Bouattia as President of the NUS, NUCA was heavily involved in the 2016 'No To NUS' campaign, which sought to disaffiliate The University of Nottingham from the NUS following evidence of institutional anti-semitism, racism, and homophobia within the NUS.

=== Social Events ===
Social Events often include bar and pub crawls. Traditionally, NUCA members are invited to join for formal dinners every year, notably for the Christmas Annual Dinner and the Vice-president's Annual Dinner (it is customary for the vice-president to invite a special guest to the latter).

== Notable alumni ==
=== Current Members of Parliament ===
- John Hayes, former Minister of State for Transport
- Andrew Griffith, Economic Secretary to the Treasury
- Gareth Davies

=== Former Members of Parliament ===
- Neil Carmichael, former chair of the Education Select Committee
- Charlie Elphicke, former Lord Commissioner of the Treasury
- Tim Janman
- Katherine Fletcher
- Scott Benton
- Andrew Bridgen
- Stephen Mosley

Others

- Sir Nigel Sherlock
- David Ross

== Magazines ==
Over its history, NUCA has published several magazines under different titles. These include Climax: The Blue Magazine (1980–83), Blueprint (1979, 84–90) and Inside Right. There were at least 38 copies of Climax produced, some of which may be found in the Nottingham Manuscripts and Special Collections.

In 2022, NUCA launched The Blue Press. Its first edition was published on 18 October 2022. The second issue some out in Spring of 2023.
