= Leslie Solley =

Leslie Judah Solley (15 December 1905 – 9 January 1968) was a British politician and barrister.

Solley was born in London and educated at Davenant Foundation School then the University of London. He worked as a scientist and then a barrister. He joined the Labour Party and won the Thurrock seat at the 1945 general election.

In 1948, Solley signed a petition written by John Platts-Mills in support of Pietro Nenni and the Italian Socialist Party, in defiance of Labour Party policy. As a result, he was warned not to contravene the party line in future.

Solley was an ardent opponent of the North Atlantic Treaty, calling instead for a united Europe and work through the United Nations. He was one of six Labour MPs to vote against signing the Treaty, and as a result of this and his previous warning, was expelled from the party. He then became a founder member of the Labour Independent Group, and contested Thurrock again in the 1950 general election as an "Independent Labour" candidate. He failed to win, and afterwards concentrated on his career in law, while also becoming prominent in the Songwriters Guild of Great Britain. He wrote many pieces of music in his life, including the songs for "The Adventures Of Twizzle" under the pseudonym Leslie Clair, an early British television series for children. His masterwork, an orchestral fantasy, "Music For Orchestra" was written in 1948 but remained undiscovered until 2008, well after his death, aged 62, in 1968.

He was the father of musician and record producer Peter Solley.

Parliament of the United Kingdom
New constituency	Member of Parliament for Thurrock; 1945 – 1950	Succeeded by Hugh Delargy
