= SS Equity =

British freighter

History
- Name: 1903–1933: SS Equity
- Operator: 1888–1905: Co-operative Wholesale Society Limited; 1905–1922: Lancashire and Yorkshire Railway; 1922–1923: London and North Western Railway; 1923–1931: London, Midland and Scottish Railway
- Port of registry: (United Kingdom)
- Builder: Earle's Shipbuilding
- Launched: 7 July 1888
- Out of service: December 1931
- Fate: Scrapped 1931

General characteristics
- Tonnage: 1888–1900: 837 gross register tons (GRT); 1900–1931: 924 gross register tons (GRT)
- Length: 1888–1900: 220 feet (67 m); 1900–1931: 247.4 feet (75.4 m)
- Beam: 32.3 feet (9.8 m)
- Draught: 13.6 feet (4.1 m)

SS Equity was a freight vessel built for the Co-operative Wholesale Society Limited in 1888.

== History ==
She was built by Earle's Shipbuilding for the Co-operative Wholesale Society for their special trade between Hamburg and Goole and launched on 7 July 1888.

On 19 November 1890 she collided with the steamer Cuxhaven from Hamburg in the Goole channel. The Cuxhaven received severe damage and was beached to prevent sinking. She grounded on sand at Goole in July 1891, but floated free on the next high tide. In March 1896 the ship fireman, William Costello, was admitted to a charge of smuggling in 61 pounds (28 kg) of compressed tobacco and 14 pounds (6.4 kg) of cavendish, with an estimated duty of £24, 7s 6d. He was remanded for 8 days. She was badly damaged in a collision with the Goole Steam Shipping Company vessel Aire on 14 December 1896 in the River Humber.

She was lengthened in 1900 with a revised tonnage of 924, and obtained in 1905 by the Lancashire and Yorkshire Railway to be employed on the Goole – Hamburg service. She was captured in Hamburg in 1914 and was returned to her owners in 1918 having spent the war period mainly serving traffic to Finland from Germany. On 25 May 1920 she ran aground in fog on Alderney in the Channel Islands carrying a cargo of potatoes from Jersey; she was refloated on 15 June 1920. In 1921 whilst on passage from Jersey to Goole on the 'potato trade' she grounded and sank but was later raised.

In 1922 she was taken over by the London and North Western Railway, and in 1923 the London, Midland and Scottish Railway. On 12 June 1925, she collided with the British steamer Rena in the North Sea off the Would Lightship and was beached at Horsey, Norfolk. On 16 December 1927 she collided with the British cargo ship Eden Force at Antwerp, Belgium; Eden Force was beached, but later was patched and towed to Terneuzen, Zeeland, in the Netherlands. Equity again grounded at Alderney in June 1930, but despite being partially swamped she was salved again. She was eventually scrapped in December 1931 at Greenock, Scotland.

== Bibliography ==
- Haws, Duncan (1993). Merchant Fleets - Britain's Railway Steamers - Eastern & North Western Companies + Zeeland and Stena. Hereford: TCL Publications. ISBN 0-946378-22-3.
