= Awkward squad =

The Auckward Squad (Isaac Cruikshank, 1794

An awkward squad is a group of individuals, normally within an existing organisation or structure, who resist or obstruct change, either through incompetence or by deliberate association.

== Origin ==
It is commonly accepted that shortly before his death in 1796 Robert Burns uttered the words "Don't let the awkward squad fire over me". At this time the phrase was in use in military slang for a group of recruits who seemed incapable of understanding discipline or not yet sufficiently trained or disciplined to properly carry out their duties.

== Literary use ==
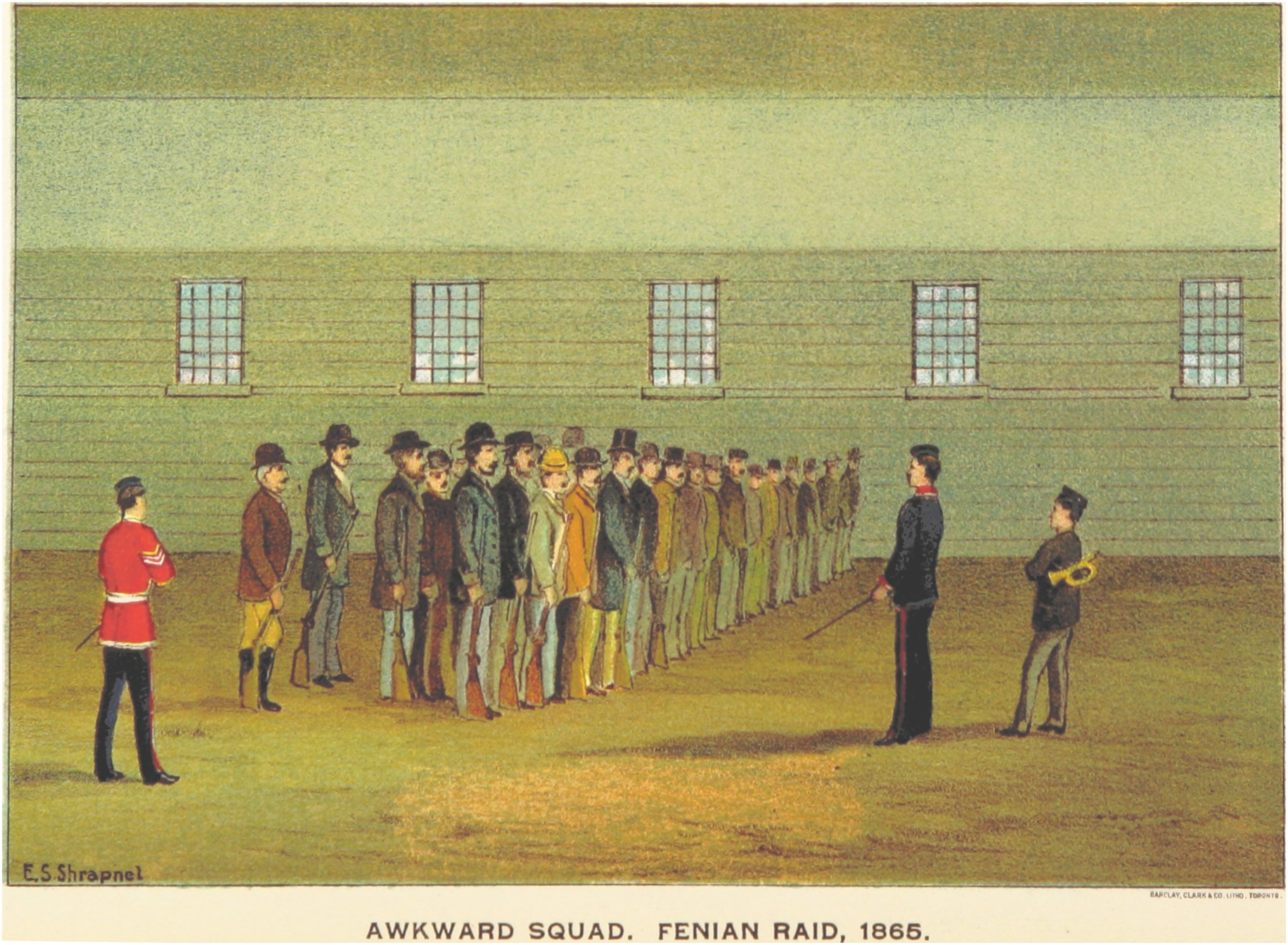
An artwork from Ontario captioned "Awkward Squad. Fenian Raid, 1865."

John Clare, an English peasant poet, wrote with his own spelling and no punctuation. He complained in the 1820s to his editors that people could understand him, and he refused to use "that awkward squad of colon, semi-colon, comma, and full stop", according to the display in the John Clare Cottage, in Helpston.

In Canto 7, stanza 52 of Byron's Don Juan, the Russian general Suvorov (or "Suwarrow" as Byron anglicizes it) is described training the 'awkward squad' prior to the battle of Ismail.

Thomas Babington Macaulay, in his 1842 essay on Frederic the Great, used the phrase to describe the army of Frederic's father.

In her 1853 novel Villette, Charlotte Brontë writes of M. Paul Emanuel: "Irritable he was; one heard that, as he apostrophized with vehemence the awkward squad under his orders." Brontë had also used the phrase four years earlier, in Shirley.

In Chapter 16 of Our Mutual Friend (1864–65), Charles Dickens described the character Sloppy as a "Full-Private Number One in the Awkward Squad of the rank and file of life".

Norman Cameron used the words to end his 1950 poem Forgive me, sire.

== Trade unionism ==
The tag of 'awkward squad' has been applied to a group of left-wing trade unionists in the United Kingdom, marked out by their opposition to the Labour Party's economic policies. The group includes Bob Crow, Mark Serwotka, and Tony Woodley. In a Parliamentary sense, however, it can also apply to the left wing of the Labour Party, which perennially occupies a bench of the House of Commons which allows its members to heckle and unnerve the Prime Minister regularly.
