= Frank Hansford-Miller =

English politician and author (1916–2008)

Frank Hansford-Miller (26 November 1916 – 21 February 2008) was a politician and prolific author in both England and Australia.

== Childhood and early life ==
Born in London, Hansford-Miller studied at Colfe's Grammar School before serving in the Royal Artillery during World War II. After the war, he studied statistics at University College London and King's College London. His studies were interrupted by tuberculosis of the spine. He began working as a maths teacher and engaged in a lengthy dispute over the rejection of his PhD by the University of London External Programme. In 1969, he instead gained a PhD from the "National University of Canada", a degree mill. He was also elected as a Fellow of the Royal Statistical Society.

== Political career ==
In 1966, Hansford-Miller founded the John Hampden New Freedom Party and, during the 1970s, he wrote a biography of John Hampden. In 1974, Hansford-Miller renamed the group the "English National Party", intending to parallel the success of Plaid Cymru and the Scottish National Party. He stood unsuccessfully under this label in numerous elections. The party achieved greater prominence in 1976 when it was joined by John Stonehouse, a Labour Party Member of Parliament who had faked his own death and spent time on remand in prison. Hansford-Miller welcomed the press to his garden shed and served them home-brewed beer. During this period, he organized St George's Day rallies in Trafalgar Square, which he addressed while wearing a Beefeater costume, and attempted to get an English national dress selected.

However, he left the party around 1980, following internal disputes. At the 1981 Greater London Council election, Hansford-Miller and his wife instead stood for the Abolition of Rates Coalition.

Around this time, Hansford-Miller emigrated to Australia, settling in Perth, where he began tutoring at the University of Western Australia, Murdoch University, and Curtin University.

== Other interests ==
He took up marathon running and race walking, setting a state record for the over-85 2000 meters walk. He also wrote prolifically, publishing more than 50 books, learned to play the digeridoo, and recorded music under the stage name "Frisky Frank".

Hansford-Miller never had children, and attracted attention in 2001 by campaigning to be cloned, complaining that, while "reproductive technology" for women was available, there was no help available for him to reproduce.
