= English National Party =

1966 party for the establishment of a separate parliament for England

- Leader: Frank Hansford-Miller
- Founded: 1966
- Dissolved: 1981
- Ideology: English devolution
- Political position: Centre-right

English National Party has been the name of various political parties of England, which have commonly called for a separate parliament for England.

== The original ENP ==
=== History ===
The English National Party (ENP) was founded as the John Hampden New Freedom Party in 1966 by Frank Hansford-Miller. "John Hampden" was a reference to a leading parliamentarian from the English Civil War. In 1974, it was renamed the "English Nationalist Party". It was defunct by 1981; by this time, Hansford-Miller had left, and he campaigned for the "Abolition of Rates Coalition" in the 1981 Greater London Council elections.

The party's best known policy was advocating a devolved English parliament. Other policies included calling for the abolition of income tax, and an end to local authority housing. It was considered to be centre-right, and not racist.

=== Performance ===
The party contested the first 1974 general election as the John Hampden New Freedom Party; it contested the second 1974 and the 1979 general elections as the ENP. Its best performance was at the second 1974 general election, where it fielded two candidates and secured 1,115 votes. It achieved its greatest notability in April 1976, when it was joined by the Member of Parliament John Stonehouse, who had formerly represented the Labour Party and at the time was awaiting trial for fraud. However, Stonehouse was convicted and left Parliament in August of that year, and the party did not stand a candidate in the subsequent by-election.

== Other parties by the name ==
According to the far-right magazine Spearhead, a group called the English National Party was one of the small far-right organisations that joined the National Front shortly after it was formed in 1967.

There have been several parties which have adopted the "English National Party" name. These include a far right organisation formed by Raymond Shenton which contested the 1984 Enfield Southgate by-election; a party founded in around 1995 by Christopher Nickerson, which aimed for England to secede from the United Kingdom to support a sense of English national identity; and a party founded by Robin Tilbrook and James Alden in 1999, with the aim of securing a devolved English Parliament, which was later renamed the English Democrats Party in 2002, and then just the English Democrats in 2004.

In April 1999, a group calling itself the "English National Party" was one of several different organisations which claimed responsibility for a nail-bomb attack in Brixton. David Copeland, who admitted to carrying out the bombing, said that the claims of responsibility were made by others to "try to steal his glory."
